= West Virginia Route 971 =

State highway in West Virginia, United States

West Virginia Route 971

Route information
- Maintained by WVDOH
- Length: 10.23 mi (16.46 km)

Major junctions
- South end: WV 97 in Baileysville
- North end: WV 10 in Oceana

Location
- Country: United States
- State: West Virginia
- Counties: Wyoming

Highway system
- West Virginia State Highway System; Interstate; US; State
← WV 956	→ WV 972

West Virginia Route 971 is a 9.9-mile (15.9 km) north–south state highway in Wyoming County, West Virginia. The route runs from West Virginia Route 97 in Baileysville north to West Virginia Route 10 in Oceana. It runs through mountainous, rural terrain, connecting Baileysville and Oceana to the communities of Clear Fork, Lillydale, and Lillyhaven. WV 971 has been the highest numbered state highway in West Virginia since July 2017, when WV 972 was decommissioned and absorbed by WV 93.

== Route description ==
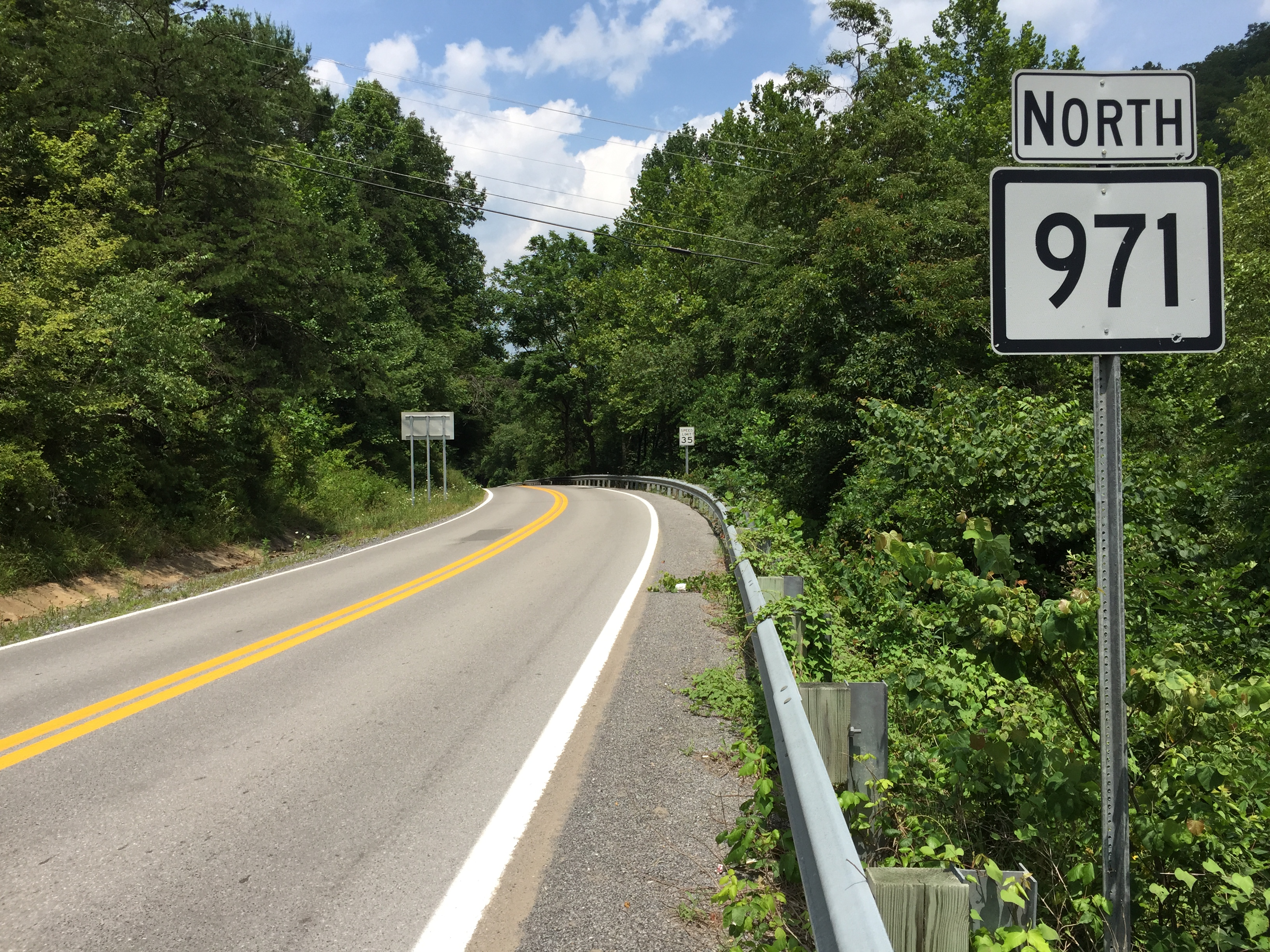
View north along WV 971 at WV 97 in Baileysville

WV 971 begins at a junction with WV 97 in Baileysville, north of the Guyandotte River. Its southern terminus lies within the R. D. Bailey Lake Wildlife Management Area, the bulk of which is located to the west of the highway. From here, the route heads north into a mountainous rural area, following the David Branch. The highway follows a winding path until meeting the Schoolhouse Branch in Clear Fork, which it follows to an intersection with County Route 6. Past this junction, the route runs northwest and then east through Clear Fork. Following the Clear Fork of the Guyandotte River and the Norfolk Southern Railroad, WV 971 continues north into rural terrain. Turning northeast, the route passes Westside High School and enters a residential area. Upon resuming its northward trajectory, the highway runs through the communities of Lillydale and Lillyhaven. The route continues northeast into the west side of Oceana, where it terminates at WV 10.

== Major intersections ==
The entire route is in Wyoming County.

Location	mi	km	Destinations	Notes
Baileysville	0.00	0.00	WV 97 – Pineville, Gilbert	Southern terminus
Oceana	10.23	16.46	WV 10	Northern terminus
1.000 mi = 1.609 km; 1.000 km = 0.621 mi
