= Combs Addition, West Virginia =

Unincorporated community in West Virginia, United States

- Unincorporated community
- Location within West Virginia Location within the United States
- Coordinates: 37°43′50″N 81°48′00″W
- Country: United States
- State: West Virginia
- County: Logan
- Elevation: 869 ft (265 m)
- Time zone: UTC-5 (Eastern (EST))
  - Summer (DST): UTC-4 (EDT)
- Area codes: 304 & 681
- GNIS feature ID: 1537542

Combs Addition is an unincorporated community in Logan County, West Virginia, United States. Combs Addition is located along Huff Creek and West Virginia Route 10, 4.3 miles (6.9 km) east-southeast of Man. It is part of the Mallory census-designated place.
