= Clear Fork (Guyandotte River tributary) =

River in the United States of America

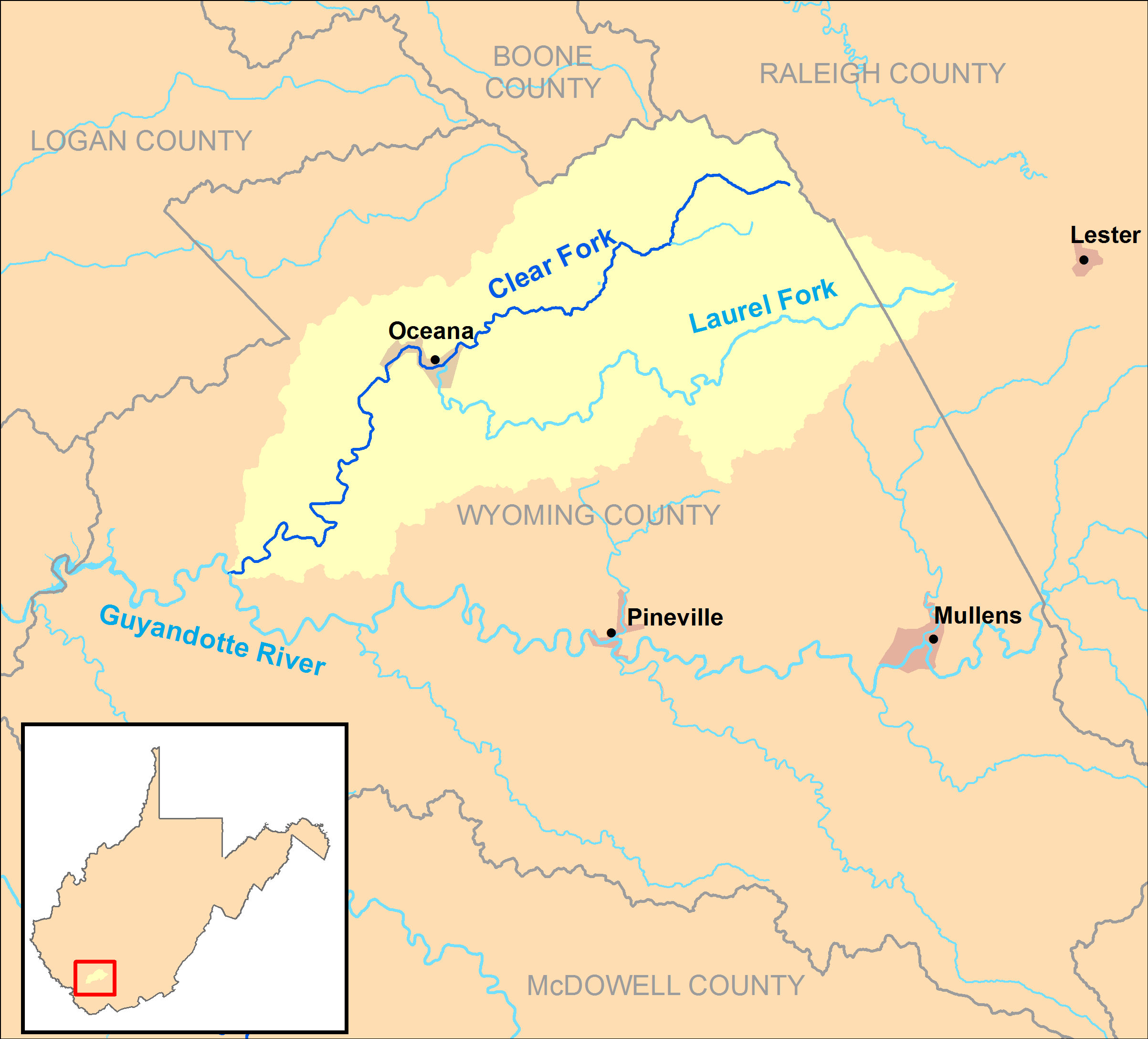
- The Clear Fork and its watershed in Wyoming and Raleigh counties, West Virginia

Location
- Country: United States
- State: West Virginia
- County: Wyoming

Physical characteristics
- Source
  - location: Guyandotte Mountain, west of Bolt
  - coordinates: 37.763168°N 81.4462161°W
  - elevation: 2,701 ft (823 m)
- Mouth: Guyandotte River
  - location: southeast of Simon
  - coordinates: 37.6076104°N 81.7306682°W
  - elevation: 1,102 ft (336 m)
- Length: 29 mi (47 km)
- Basin size: 129 sq mi (330 km^{2})

The Clear Fork is a tributary of the Guyandotte River, 29 miles (47 km) long, in southern West Virginia in the United States. Via the Guyandotte and Ohio rivers, it is part of the watershed of the Mississippi River, draining an area of 129 square miles (330 km^{2}) in a rural area on the unglaciated portion of the Allegheny Plateau. The Clear Fork flows for its entire length in Wyoming County; its tributary the Laurel Fork also drains a small area of western Raleigh County.

The Clear Fork rises in northern Wyoming County, approximately 2 miles (3.2 km) west of Bolt, and flows generally southwestward through the communities of Crany, Toney Fork, Oceana, Lillyhaven, Lillydale, Clear Fork, and Sun Hill. It flows into the Guyandotte River from the east, to the southeast of the community of Simon in the R.D. Bailey Lake Wildlife Management Area. The stream is paralleled by West Virginia Route 85 between Toney Fork and Oceana; by West Virginia Route 10 from Oceana to north of Lillyhaven; and by West Virginia Route 971 between the Lillyhaven vicinity and Clear Fork.

== See also ==
- List of rivers of West Virginia
