= Mallory, West Virginia =

- Census-designated place
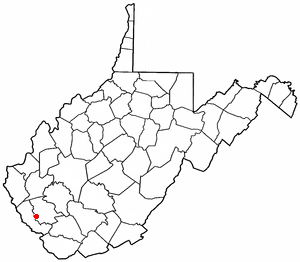
- Location of Mallory, West Virginia
- Coordinates: 37°43′49″N 81°50′9″W
- Country: United States
- State: West Virginia
- County: Logan

Area
  - Total: 4.41 sq mi (11.43 km^{2})
  - Land: 4.36 sq mi (11.30 km^{2})
  - Water: 0.050 sq mi (0.13 km^{2})
- Elevation: 790 ft (240 m)

Population (2020)
  - Total: 1,552
  - Density: 355.7/sq mi (137.3/km^{2})
- Time zone: UTC-5 (Eastern (EST))
  - Summer (DST): UTC-4 (EDT)
- ZIP code: 25634
- Area codes: 304 & 681
- FIPS code: 54-50860
- GNIS feature ID: 1555032

Mallory is a census-designated place (CDP) in Logan County, West Virginia, United States. The population was 1,552 at the 2020 census (down from 1,654 at the 2010 census). The CDP contains the unincorporated communities, from west to east, of Huff Junction, Mallory, Davin, Mineral City, Claypool, Combs Addition, and Gillman Bottom.

The community was named after the local Mallory Coal Company.

== Geography ==
Mallory is located in southern Logan County at 37°43′49″N 81°50′9″W (37.730315, -81.835857), along Huff Creek and West Virginia Route 10. It is 3 miles (5 km) southeast of the town of Man and 16 miles (26 km) southeast of Logan, the county seat. Via Route 10, Mallory is 16 miles (26 km) northwest of Oceana.

According to the United States Census Bureau, the CDP has a total area of 4.4 square miles (11.4 km^{2}), of which 0.04 square miles (0.1 km^{2}), or 1.11%, are water. Via Huff Creek, Mallory is part of the Guyandotte River watershed, which flows north to the Ohio River near Huntington.

== Demographics ==
At the 2000 census there were 1,143 people, 437 households, and 343 families in the CDP. The population density was 99.2 people per square mile (38.3/km^{2}). There were 491 housing units at an average density of 42.6/sq mi (16.4/km^{2}). The racial makeup of the CDP was 96.94% White, 2.27% African American, 0.09% Asian, and 0.70% from two or more races. Of the 437 households 30.0% had children under the age of 18 living with them, 61.1% were married couples living together, 14.6% had a female householder with no husband present, and 21.5% were non-families. 19.0% of households were one person and 8.9% were one person aged 65 or older. The average household size was 2.62 and the average family size was 2.97.

The age distribution was 22.6% under the age of 18, 8.6% from 18 to 24, 27.2% from 25 to 44, 27.6% from 45 to 64, and 14.0% 65 or older. The median age was 39 years. For every 100 females, there were 92.7 males. For every 100 females age 18 and over, there were 93.2 males.

The median household income was $24,458 and the median family income was $27,813. Males had a median income of $27,625 versus $14,750 for females. The per capita income for the CDP was $11,654. About 21.8% of families and 25.9% of the population were below the poverty line, including 45.7% of those under age 18 and 4.8% of those age 65 or over.
