= Campus, West Virginia =

Community in West Virginia, US

- Unincorporated community
- Location within West Virginia Location within the United States
- Coordinates: 37°43′32″N 81°43′04″W
- Country: United States
- State: West Virginia
- County: Wyoming
- Elevation: 1,070 ft (330 m)
- Time zone: UTC-5 (Eastern (EST))
  - Summer (DST): UTC-4 (EDT)
- Area codes: 304 & 681
- GNIS feature ID: 1536982

Campus is an unincorporated community in Wyoming County, West Virginia, United States. Campus is located along Huff Creek and West Virginia Route 10, at 5.6 miles (9.0 km) west-northwest of Oceana.
