= Crany, West Virginia =

Community in West Virginia, US

Crany
- Unincorporated community
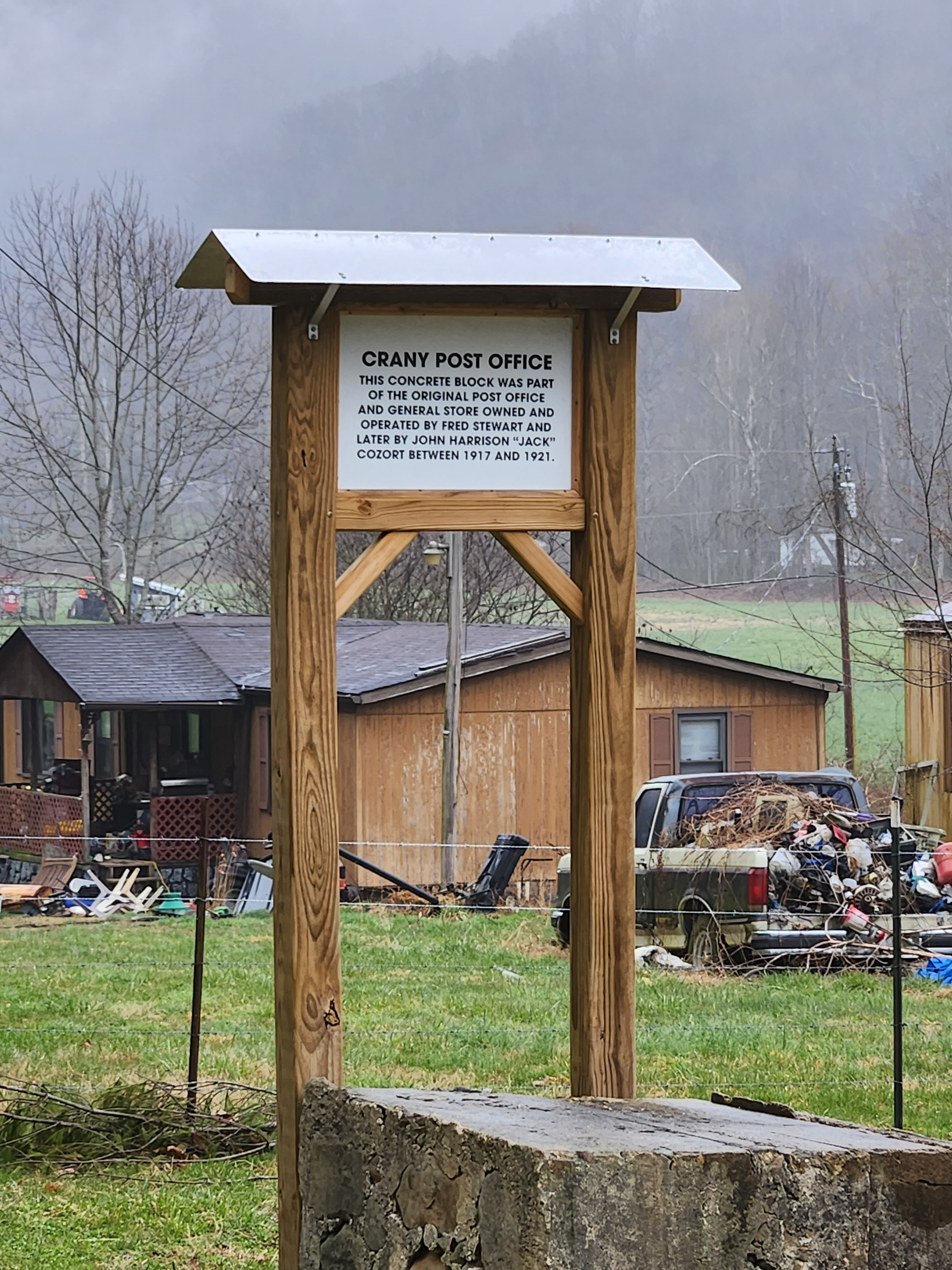
- In the mid-1850s, there was a sufficient population at Crany for the establishment of a post office, the second one in Wyoming County. The first post office was at Oceana, the county seat.

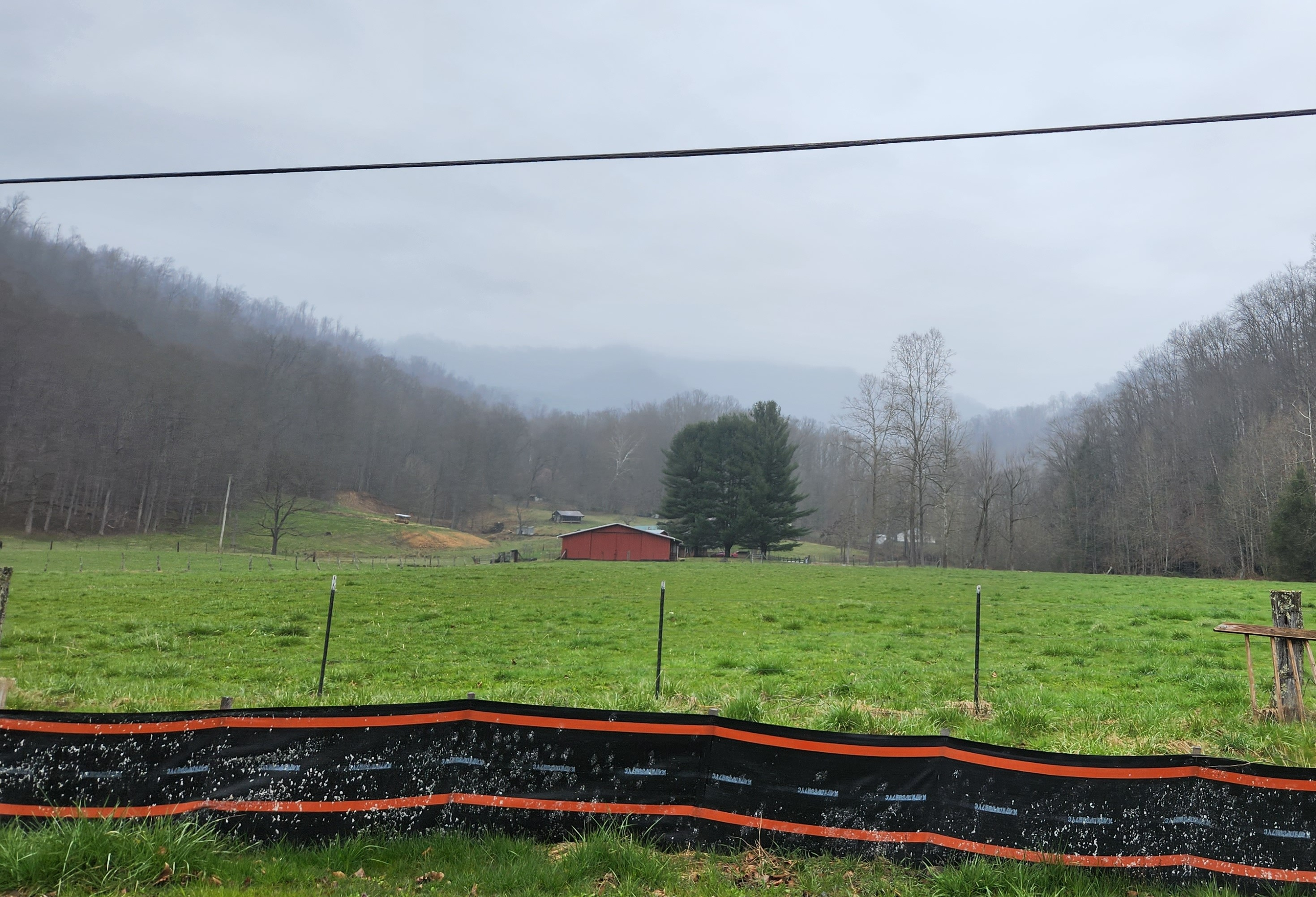
- A farm house in Crany, West Virginia.

- Location within the state of West Virginia Crany (the United States)
- Coordinates: 37°44′24″N 81°32′09″W
- Country: United States
- State: West Virginia
- County: Wyoming
- Elevation: 1,506 ft (459 m)
- Time zone: UTC-5 (Eastern (EST))
  - Summer (DST): UTC-4 (EDT)
- ZIP codes: 24870
- GNIS ID: 1549645

Crany is an unincorporated community in Wyoming County, West Virginia, United States, situated along the Clear Fork. It was one of the originally populated settlements of the region and is situated in a fertile farming plain. The community consists of small family farms, has retained much of the descendants of the original pioneers of the region, and was a historically important region for logging in the early 20th century.

== Etymology ==
The origin of the name has been explained through two traditional stories stating that the community was named after the Crane Fork, a small tributary of the Clear Fork, which was later shortened to Crany deriving from the mountain dialect spoken by the pioneer settlers. Another explanation of the etymology may stem from a misprint of the word Cranny, meaning an obscure nook or corner.

== History ==
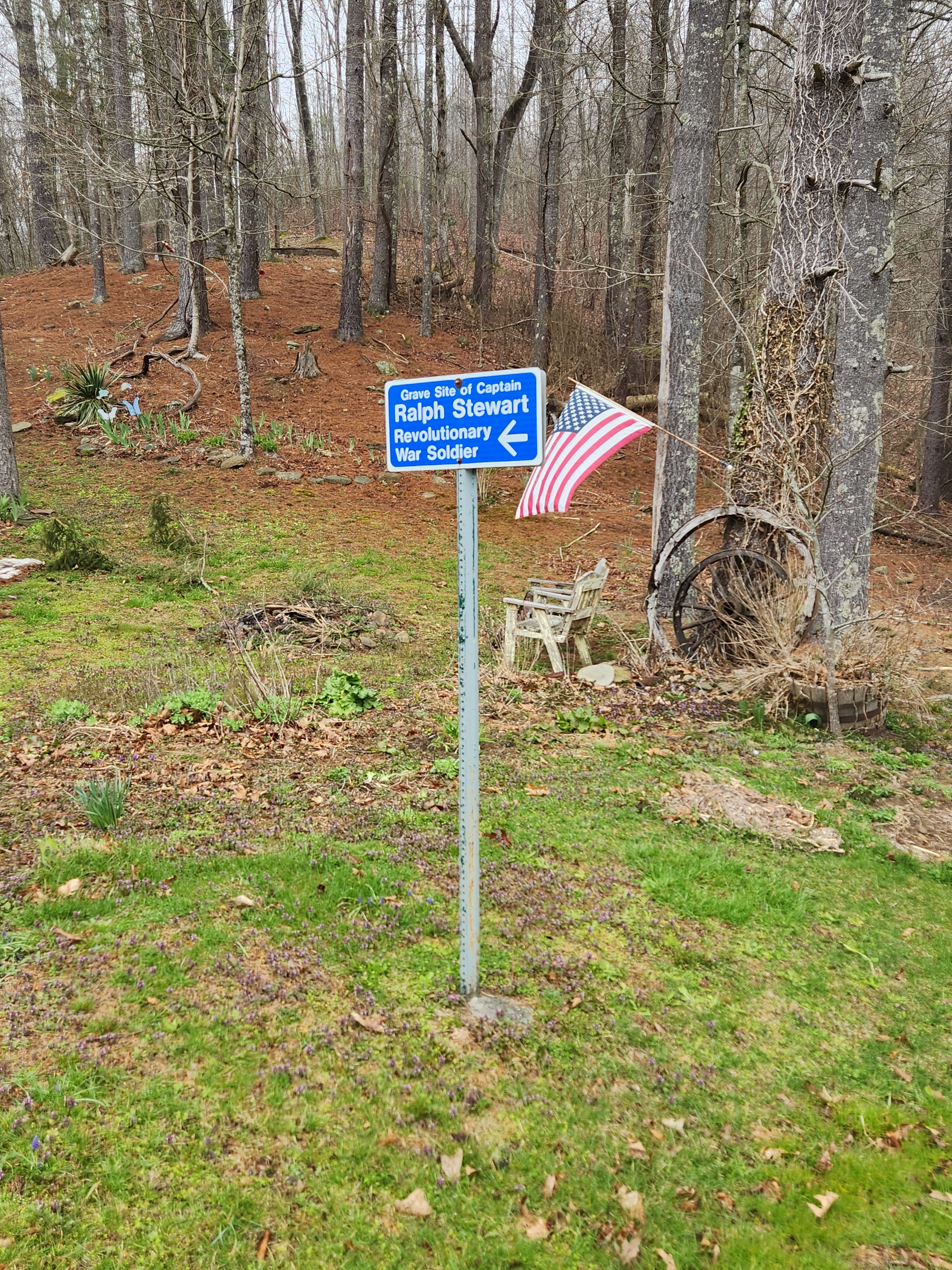
A sign stating the burial location of revolutionary war hero Ralph Stewart.

In 1795, the Valley that surrounds Crany was surveyed as part of Montgomery County, Virginia as a larger tract of land belonging to Joseph Tidball and Charles Myn Thurston. James Welch acquired the land patent and sold it to Joseph Mandeville in 1797. Captain Ralph Stewart and his family were the first settlers of Crany arriving in 1800, although he did not legally own land in the county, Stewart settled in the Crany Fork Valley, where his children also settled and married into local families.

Stewart was the second settler in the area within the modern-day county, along with John Cooke who settled and founded Oceana. Stewart first squatted on the land to escape being arrested for murders he committed, despite being later pardoned by the governor, he chose to live in the wilderness surrounded by mountains of the region that rise over 2,000 feet. Stewart's headstone stands at the mouth of Bee Branch in Crany.

Ralph Canterbury, Daniel Gunnoe, and Perry Bailey were among the businessmen who operated several stores at different Crany locations in the 19th century. The Crany community had a school built in 1850, authorized by the county board of education led by William Brooks. Richard Brooks, William's father, was the first teacher. Two schools, Crany and Adkin, were established and served the children of the valley. The Crany school was abolished between the 1940s and '50s, while the Adkin school was abolished around 1965. The Crany Missionary Baptist Church was founded by Rev. James L. Marshall in 1886 and initially held services in the school and in homes. The congregation now meets in a modern building located midway through the valley.
