= Sun Hill, West Virginia =

Community in West Virginia, US

- Unincorporated community
- Location within West Virginia Location within the United States
- Coordinates: 37°37′25″N 81°42′11″W
- Country: United States
- State: West Virginia
- County: Wyoming
- Elevation: 1,158 ft (353 m)
- Time zone: UTC-5 (Eastern (EST))
  - Summer (DST): UTC-4 (EDT)
- Area codes: 304 & 681
- GNIS feature ID: 1547744

Sun Hill is an unincorporated community in Wyoming County, West Virginia, United States. Sun Hill is located on the Clear Fork and County Route 6. 6.4 miles (10.3 km) southwest of Oceana.
