= Mineral City, West Virginia =

- Unincorporated community
- Location within West Virginia Location within the United States
- Coordinates: 37°44′01″N 81°49′25″W
- Country: United States
- State: West Virginia
- County: Logan
- Elevation: 814 ft (248 m)
- Time zone: UTC-5 (Eastern (EST))
  - Summer (DST): UTC-4 (EDT)
- Area codes: 304 & 681
- GNIS feature ID: 1555134

Mineral City is an unincorporated community in Logan County, West Virginia, United States. Mineral City is located along Huff Creek and West Virginia Route 10, 3 miles (4.8 km) east of Man. It is part of the Mallory census-designated place.
