= Lacoma, West Virginia =

Community in West Virginia, US

- Unincorporated community
- Location within West Virginia Location within the United States
- Coordinates: 37°44′36″N 81°40′46″W
- Country: United States
- State: West Virginia
- County: Wyoming
- Elevation: 1,197 ft (365 m)
- Time zone: UTC-5 (Eastern (EST))
  - Summer (DST): UTC-4 (EDT)
- Area codes: 304 & 681
- GNIS feature ID: 1541303

Lacoma is an unincorporated community in Wyoming County, West Virginia, United States. Lacoma is located along Huff Creek and West Virginia Route 10, 4.7 miles (7.6 km) northwest of Oceana.
