= Smokeless =

Smokeless may refer to:

- Smokeless powder, propellants that produce little to no smoke
- Smokeless tobacco, tobacco that is used by means other than smoking
- Smokeless, West Virginia
