= Gillman Bottom, West Virginia =

Unincorporated community in West Virginia, United States

- Unincorporated community
- Location within West Virginia Location within the United States
- Coordinates: 37°43′43″N 81°47′38″W
- Country: United States
- State: West Virginia
- County: Logan
- Elevation: 879 ft (268 m)
- Time zone: UTC-5 (Eastern (EST))
  - Summer (DST): UTC-4 (EDT)
- Area codes: 304 & 681
- GNIS feature ID: 1554554

Gillman Bottom is an unincorporated community in Logan County, West Virginia, United States. Gillman Bottom is located along Huff Creek and West Virginia Route 10, 4.7 miles (7.6 km) east-southeast of Man. It is part of the Mallory census-designated place.
