= Cyclone, West Virginia =

Community in West Virginia, US

Cyclone
- Unincorporated community
- Location within the state of West Virginia Cyclone (the United States)
- Coordinates: 37°43′58″N 81°41′19″W
- Country: United States
- State: West Virginia
- County: Wyoming
- Time zone: UTC-5 (Eastern (EST))
  - Summer (DST): UTC-4 (EDT)
- ZIP codes: 24827
- Area codes: 304 & 681

Cyclone is an unincorporated community in Wyoming County, West Virginia, United States, along Huff Creek and West Virginia Route 10.

The community was named for the fact a tornado or cyclone struck the area in the 1880s.
