= Lillydale, West Virginia =

Lillydale, West Virginia may refer to:

- Lillydale, Monroe County, West Virginia, an unincorporated community in Monroe County
- Lillydale, Wyoming County, West Virginia, an unincorporated community in Wyoming County
