= Jamie Noble =

American professional wrestler (born 1976)

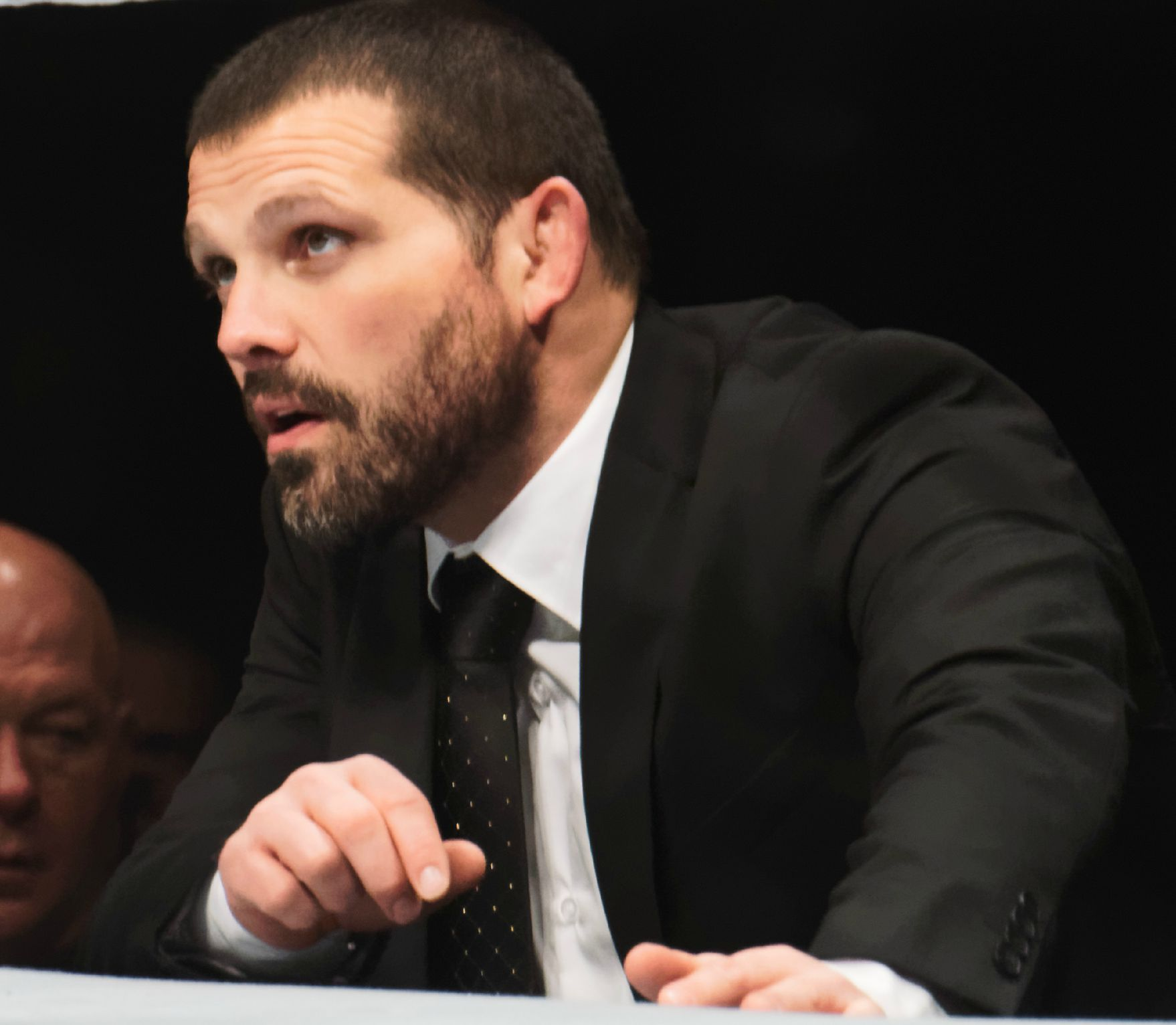
- Noble in 2015

Personal information
- Born: James Gibson; December 23, 1976 (age 49) Hanover, West Virginia, U.S.
- Spouse: Angela England (m. 1994)
- Children: 2

Professional wrestling career
- Ring name(s): James Gibson; Jamie Howard; Jamie Knoble; Jamie Noble; Jamie-San
- Billed height: 5 ft 9 in (175 cm)
- Billed weight: 202 lb (92 kg)
- Billed from: Hanover, West Virginia
- Trained by: Bill Weaver; Dean Malenko
- Debut: 1995
- Retired: December 11, 2022

James Gibson (born December 23, 1976) is an American retired professional wrestler better known by the ring name Jamie Noble. He is signed to WWE, where he works as a producer. In addition to his work with WWE, Noble is known for his tenures in World Championship Wrestling (WCW), New Japan Pro-Wrestling (NJPW), and Ring of Honor (ROH), where he is a former one-time ROH World Champion.

== Professional wrestling career ==
=== Early career (1995–1999) ===
Gibson was trained to wrestle by Dean Malenko and Bill Weaver. He debuted on the independent circuit in 1995.

=== World Championship Wrestling (1999–2001) ===
In 1999, Gibson joined World Championship Wrestling. After training at the WCW Power Plant, he made his first appearance with the promotion on July 11, 1999, under the ring name "Jamie Howard", teaming with Jet Jaguar in a loss to CG Afi and Jeremy Lopez in a dark match at Bash at the Beach. He made his televised debut on the September 28, 1999, episode of WCW Saturday Night, defeating Alan Funk. He went on to perform in the promotion's cruiserweight division.

In February 2000, Gibson was renamed "Jamie-San" and reintroduced to WCW television as a member of the East Asian stable Jung Dragons, with Gibson wearing a mask to conceal the fact that he was Caucasian. The stable was made up of Gibson, Jimmy Yang, Kaz Hayashi and their valet, Leia Meow. Throughout mid-2000, The Jung Dragons feuded with rival stable 3 Count. Gibson made his pay-per-view debut at New Blood Rising on August 13, 2000, with The Jung Dragons losing to 3 Count in a double ladder match.

In November 2000, Gibson left The Jung Dragons and formed a tag team with former 3 Count member Evan Karagias. Gibson removed his mask and adopted the ring name "Jamie Knoble", with he and Karagias performing as "Noble and Courageous". Noble and Courageous feuded with the remaining members of The Jung Dragons and 3 Count. Gibson continued to wrestle for WCW until the promotion was purchased by the World Wrestling Federation in March 2001.

=== World Wrestling Federation/Entertainment (2001–2004) ===
Upon the acquisition of WCW by the World Wrestling Federation (later renamed World Wrestling Entertainment) in March 2001, Gibson was one of the WCW wrestlers to be signed by the WWF. He was assigned to the WWF developmental territory Heartland Wrestling Association for seasoning, where he won the HWA Cruiserweight Championship under the Jamie Knoble name.

Knoble debuted on the main WWE roster on the June 6, 2002, episode of SmackDown! by attacking The Hurricane and was joined by Nidia in a trailer park trash gimmick. The spelling of his ring name was tweaked to "Jamie Noble" a few weeks afterwards. He won the WWE Cruiserweight Championship from Hurricane at King of the Ring and feuded with Tajiri and Billy Kidman. Noble held the title for 147 days until he lost the title to Billy Kidman at Survivor Series on November 17, 2002. Noble then got an inheritance, making both Nidia and Noble rich. Noble and Nidia both turned face by befriending Torrie Wilson and Billy Gunn. Nidia finally left him after she was "blinded" by then-heel Tajiri's black mist. He became a heel again by doing things he thought Nidia could not see (mainly using her as a human shield) and lied to her about them. During that time he also feuded with Rey Mysterio for the Cruiserweight Championship. The two would face off for the Championship and Noble lost. A Boyfriend vs. Girlfriend Blindfold Match was then scheduled for Noble and Nidia at No Way Out. Noble came out on top after cheating to see where Nidia was. At WrestleMania XX, Noble competed in the Cruiserweight Open for the WWE Cruiserweight Championship which was won by Chavo Guerrero. On the Sunday Night Heat before The Great American Bash, Noble lost to Spike Dudley. He left WWE on September 15, 2004, when his steroid usage came to light following a staph infection. Gibson was then released from his contract at his request to take some time off.

=== New Japan Pro-Wrestling (2004–2005) ===
Upon leaving WWE, Gibson began performing under his birth name. In September 2004, he began wrestling for the Japanese promotion New Japan Pro-Wrestling, where he formed a tag team with American Dragon. He made his final appearance with NJPW in February 2005.

=== Ring of Honor (2005) ===
In February 2005, Gibson began wrestling for Ring of Honor. While in ROH he wrestled in Hawaii on June 25 and 26, 2005, on the debut shows of new promotion Action Zone Wrestling (AZW) wrestling AJ Styles both nights. He lost the first night in Waianae and won on the second night in Honolulu. On August 12, 2005, Gibson defeated CM Punk, Samoa Joe and Christopher Daniels in an elimination four-way match to win the ROH World Championship. He held the championship until September 17, 2005, when he was defeated by Bryan Danielson. Gibson made his final appearance with Ring of Honor in October 2005, rejoining WWE shortly thereafter.

=== Return to WWE (2005–present) ===
Noble made his return to WWE on the December 17, 2005, episode of Velocity and would later frequently team up with fellow cruiserweight Kid Kash; during June 2006, Noble and Kash debuted a gimmick, where they wore dog collars, and barked and bit and had a short face run. The pair quickly turned heel and were soon named "The Pitbulls". They then entered the hunt for the WWE Tag Team Championship. The Pitbulls disbanded after Kash was fired from WWE on September 27, 2006.

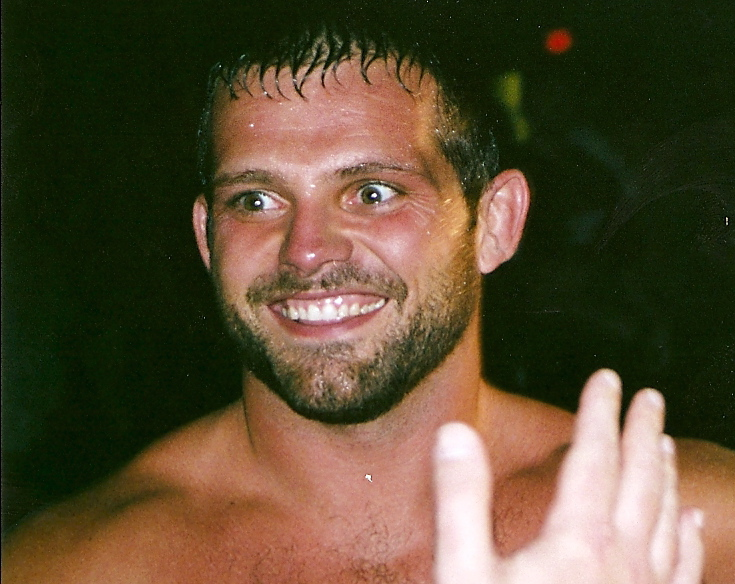
Noble during a WWE event in 2007

In 2007, Noble returned to competing in the cruiserweight division and performing as an enhancement talent against Rey Mysterio and Bobby Lashley. At No Way Out, Noble competed in a cruiserweight Gauntlet Match for the WWE Cruiserweight Championship. He was eliminated by his former WCW teammate, Jimmy Wang Yang. Noble returned to television on the June 8 episode of SmackDown!, teaming up with Chavo Guerrero and Daivari against Paul London, Brian Kendrick and Wang Yang in a losing effort. On the June 15 episode of SmackDown!, Noble competed in a Fatal Four-Way number one contenders match for the Cruiserweight Championship, which he lost to Jimmy Wang Yang and also involved Shannon Moore and Daivari. In July, Noble was unsuccessful in a triple threat match for the Cruiserweight Championship against then Champion Guerrero and Funaki. Noble then competed in the Cruiserweight Open at The Great American Bash but was pinned by Hornswoggle. Noble would then begin a feud with Hornswoggle that would see him lose in various humiliating fashions, usually by countout. Moore would constantly use his obsession with Hornswoggle to humiliate him as well. After his feud with Hornswoggle ended, Noble began an angle where he was easily defeated in his matches as punishment for being disrespectful to then-SmackDown! general manager, Vickie Guerrero. He was eventually placed in a match with Chuck Palumbo, which was expected to be yet another squash. Noble, however, defeated Palumbo, which began a feud between the two, as well as involving Palumbo's "friend" Michelle McCool. After his fourth win against Palumbo he came out when Chuck threatened to hurt McCool. Later in a tag team match, Palumbo attacked Noble and McCool, becoming a heel in the process. As a result of the double turn, Noble became a face character once again.

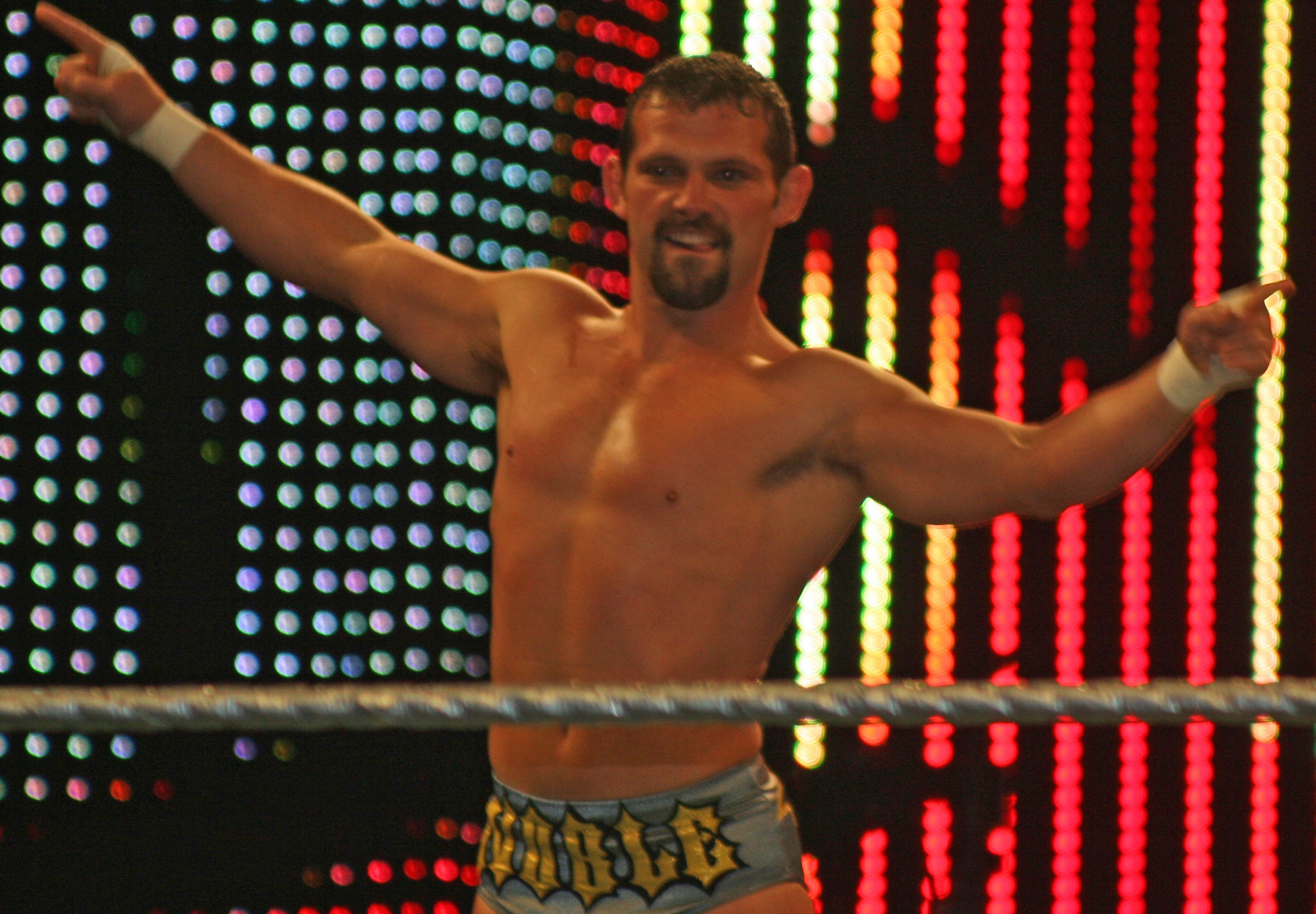
Noble during an ECW event in March 2008

As part of the 2008 WWE Supplemental Draft, Noble was drafted to the Raw brand. Noble was then involved in a storyline where he tried to impress Layla on multiple occasions only to antagonize and be beaten by larger opponents. He started a feud with William Regal over the course of the storyline, with the two trading wins, and Layla, between them. On the September 15, 2008, episode of Raw, the feud escalated following Noble's victory over Paul Burchill. Layla came out and told Noble it was over and she found a man worthy of her in Regal. On the February 3 episode of ECW Noble asked then-ECW General Manager Theodore Long for an ECW contract and lost to The Boogeyman.

On the February 23 episode of Raw, Noble suffered a neck injury in a match with Mike Knox, and was taken to a local hospital. His injury meant that the scheduled segment between Chris Jericho and Ricky Steamboat that was meant to take place in the ring, had to take place on the stage instead. It was later confirmed that the injury was not severe. Noble made his return about one month later. During a match with Sheamus on the November 2, 2009, episode of Raw, Noble sustained a back injury after getting a Powerbomb onto the concrete. On November 10, 2009, Noble announced he was retiring from professional wrestling due to the effects of the injury and several other nagging injuries sustained over his career. Upon retiring, Noble began working as a producer. He made occasional appearances on WWE programming and wrestled sporadically at house shows, including a bout with World Heavyweight Champion at the time Daniel Bryan on January 13, 2012.

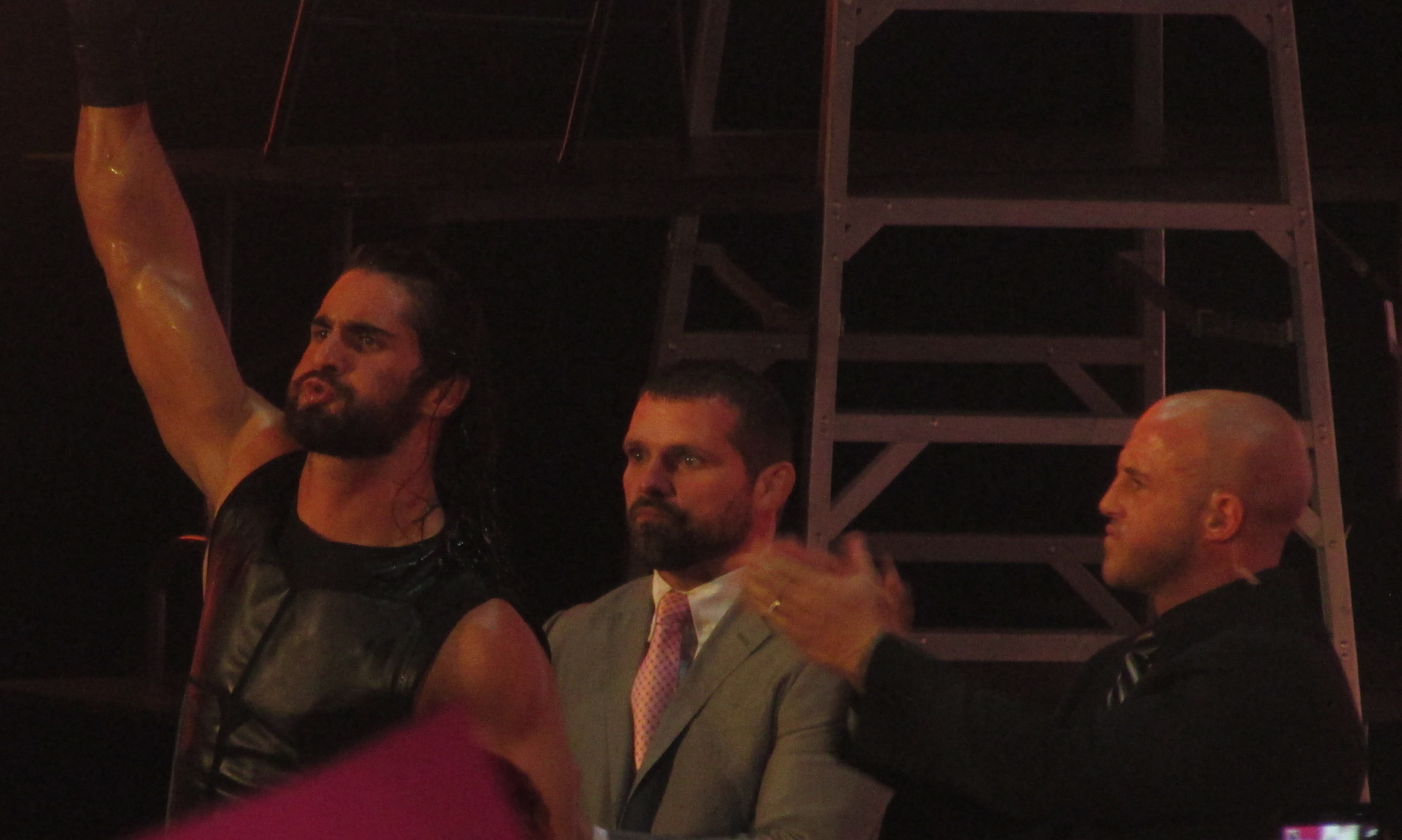
Noble (center) with J&J Security partner Joey Mercury (right) and Seth Rollins (left) in December 2014

On the September 29, 2014, episode of Raw, Noble and fellow producer Joey Mercury aligned themselves with the villainous stable The Authority. They were later named "J&J Security", with Noble and Mercury acting as bodyguards to Authority member Seth Rollins. On the November 24 episode of Raw, Noble, along with Mercury, would wrestle their first televised matches in several years, when they teamed up with Rollins in a 3-on-2 Handicap match against John Cena and Dolph Ziggler in a losing effort. On the February 5, 2015, episode of SmackDown, J&J Security once again teamed with Rollins, this time in a 3-on-1 handicap match against Daniel Bryan, once again in a losing effort. After weeks of tension between Rollins and The Authority, on the June 8 episode of Raw, J&J Security stood up to Rollins, leaving him, before defeating Rollins in a 2-on-1 Handicap match following interference from Dean Ambrose. However, on the June 22 episode of Raw, after Rollins apologized to The Authority for his behaviour and Brock Lesnar returning and attacking him, J&J Security and Kane would help Rollins attack Lesnar. Noble would legitimately suffer three broken ribs from Lesnar after being thrown into the barricade during the brawl. On the July 6 episode of "Raw", Brock Lesnar viciously attacked J&J Security, whom an afraid Rollins sent to the ramp with Mercury to stop him from getting his hands on Rollins by confronting him near their (J&J Security's) new Cadillac, which Rollins had just given them as a gift of his appreciation the previous week. Noble was promptly beaten down by Lesnar and locked into a Kimura Lock submission maneuver. Following this, it was announced that both Noble and Mercury would be out of action indefinitely.

In 2017, Noble was seen backstage at Great Balls of Fire assisting Raw General Manager Kurt Angle with the rescue of Braun Strowman who had been trapped in an ambulance due to Roman Reigns crashing into it with a truck, following their ambulance match. On the May 28, 2018, episode of Raw, Noble helped Seth Rollins walk after he was attacked by Elias. He has been involved as a security team member, in numerous pull-apart brawls on Raw and SmackDown throughout 2018 and 2020. On the May 29, 2020, episode of SmackDown, Noble was among officials on the scene following a hit-and-run on Elias and found a seemingly inebriated Jeff Hardy, who was then arrested. On the March 12, 2021, episode of SmackDown, Noble was seen shielding Cesaro from Rollins who attacked him. On December 11, 2022, during the WWE Holiday Tour in Charleston, West Virginia, Noble made a one-night-only return to competition. In his final match, Noble teamed with Braun Strowman and The Brawling Brutes (Ridge Holland and Butch) against The Bloodline (The Usos, Solo Sikoa and Sami Zayn). Noble picked up the victory after hitting the Gibson driver on Zayn.

On January 24, 2026's Saturday Night Main Event, Noble returned again as security staff, feebly attempting to break up a fight between Cody Rhodes and Jacob Fatu.

== Personal life ==
Gibson attended Baileysville High School in Baileysville, West Virginia, where he met his future wife, Angela England. The couple have a son, Gage, and a daughter, Paige. He has since been remarried to Sasha Gibson and relocated to Florida. He has two half brothers, Cody and Dale.

On September 28, 2016, Gibson was stabbed twice outside of his West Virginia home and was hospitalized after an alleged dispute with a driver. On October 5, 2016, it was revealed that he had a collapsed lung from the stabbing.

== Championships and accomplishments ==
- Heartland Wrestling Association
  - HWA Cruiserweight Championship (1 time)
- Independent Professional Wrestling
  - IPW Light Heavyweight Championship (1 time)
- Pro Wrestling Illustrated
  - PWI ranked him No. 42 of the top 500 singles wrestlers of the year in the PWI 500 in 2002
- Ring of Honor
  - ROH World Championship (1 time)
- World Wrestling Entertainment
  - WWE Cruiserweight Championship (1 time)
