= Toney Fork, West Virginia =

Community in West Virginia, US

- Unincorporated community
- Location within West Virginia Location within the United States
- Coordinates: 37°42′46″N 81°35′51″W
- Country: United States
- State: West Virginia
- County: Wyoming
- Elevation: 1,362 ft (415 m)
- Time zone: UTC-5 (Eastern (EST))
  - Summer (DST): UTC-4 (EDT)
- Area codes: 304 & 681
- GNIS feature ID: 1548155

Toney Fork is an unincorporated community in Wyoming County, West Virginia, United States. Toney Fork is located on West Virginia Route 85 at the confluence of the Clear Fork and the Toney Fork, 2 miles (3.2 km) northeast of Oceana.

The community takes its name from nearby Toney Fork creek.
