= Claypool, Logan County, West Virginia =

Unincorporated community in West Virginia, United States

Claypool, West Virginia
- Unincorporated community
- Location within West Virginia Location within the United States
- Coordinates: 37°43′59″N 81°48′52″W
- Country: United States
- State: West Virginia
- County: Logan
- Elevation: 840 ft (256 m)
- Time zone: UTC-5 (Eastern (EST))
  - Summer (DST): UTC-4 (EDT)
- Area codes: 304 & 681
- GNIS feature ID: 1554142

Claypool is an unincorporated community in Logan County, West Virginia, United States. Claypool is located along West Virginia Route 10 and Huff Creek, 3.5 miles (5.6 km) east of Man. It is part of the Mallory census-designated place.
