= List of killings by law enforcement officers in the United States, February 2025 =

This is a list of people reported killed by non-military law enforcement officers in the United States in February 2025, whether in the line of duty or not, and regardless of reason or method. The listing documents the occurrence of a death, making no implications regarding wrongdoing or justification on the part of the person killed or officer involved. Killings are arranged by date of the incident that caused death. Different death dates, if known, are noted in the description. The table below lists 102 people.

== February 2025 ==
| Date | Name (age) of deceased | Race | Location | Description |
|---|---|---|---|---|
| 2025-02-28 | unidentified male | Unknown | Jerome, Idaho | Deputies responded to a house for disturbance and encountered an individual who was armed with a gun, standing in the roadway. The incident escalated before the suspect was fatally shot. |
| 2025-02-28 | Harold Chamberlain Jr. (61) | White | Stafford, Virginia | An off-duty FBI agent confronted a motorcyclist for driving recklessly. The motorcyclist left, but returned with two family members and caused a disturbance with both the off-duty agent and responding sheriff's deputies, resulting in a physical altercation. Chamberlain, a 61-year-old man who lived nearby, left his home to defuse the situation. At some point, the agent's gun went off, striking Chamberlain and grazing a deputy. It is not known if the agent intentionally fired their weapon or not. |
| 2025-02-28 | Robert S. Rose (35) | Black | North Charleston, South Carolina | Dorchester County deputies responded to a mental health detention order, during which Rose reportedly struck a deputy with a hatchet. Following a barricade situation, Rose left his apartment with two hatchets. Deputies shouted commands, then shot at Rose six times. |
| 2025-02-28 | David McElvain (67) | White | Albuquerque, New Mexico | APD responded to a report of a suicidal subject, McElvain. McElvain made suicidal statements and was armed with a gun during the encounter. Officers shot him dead after he took out the gun.The footage was released. |
| 2025-02-27 | Matthew Walter Wong (22) | Asian | Salem, Oregon | Wong gave a threatening note to a guard stationed at a military facility adjacent to McNary Field. An Oregon State Police trooper responded to the scene and confronted him. He charged at the trooper with a knife then walked away before being shot twice. A taser was deployed but it was ineffective. Wong also pulled a knife on police last year and had a warrant for his arrest. The shooting was justified by grand jury.The footage was released. |
| 2025-02-27 | Dylan Oakley Lushbough (26) | White | Apache, Oklahoma | Comanche County deputies responded to a call regarding a shooting incident. When they knocked on the suspect's door, the suspect reportedly opened the door with a gun and aimed it at them. Deputies then fatally shot the suspect. |
| 2025-02-27 | George Clyde Manning III (43) | Black | Riverside, Missouri | Manning shot and killed a victim at a car wash and stole their vehicle. Manning then drove to a nearby home, where he shot a woman and a boy, killing the latter. He also kidnapped a girl, who was the child of him and the woman he shot. After driving to Kansas City, Kansas, where he was reported for an assault, Manning returned to Missouri, where state troopers and HSI agents shot and killed him. The girl was physically unharmed. |
| 2025-02-27 | Andrew Evans Jr. (57) | Unknown | Kansas City, Missouri | During a domestic violence call, state troopers fatally shot Evans after he allegedly approached them with a knife. |
| 2025-02-27 | Keith Tyler Prock (38) | White | Maricopa, Arizona | Prock, a man with outstanding warrants, was shot and killed by officers after shooting one of them multiple times. The wounded officer is in stable condition.The footage was released. |
| 2025-02-27 | Susan Lu (56) | Asian | Rosemead, California | LASD deputies responded to an arson-in-progress call by Lu's neighbor. When police arrived, Lu ran into her residence. After deputies entered, a deputy shot Lu after she approached them with a meat cleaver. A less-lethal weapon was also used on her.The footage was released. |
| 2025-02-27 | Levincer Swanson (36) | Black | Houston, Texas | A Harris County deputy responded to a report of a man damaging gas pump and acting erratically. Swanson fought with a deputy, who got on top of Swanson while he grabbed at the deputy's head and neck. Another deputy shot Swanson after taser deployment was ineffective. Swanson was not armed. The footage was released by the Harris County Sheriff's Office. The deputy who shot Swanson was charged with murder in 2026. |
| 2025-02-26 | Calvin Ly-Bishop (23) | Asian | Londonderry, New Hampshire | LPD officers responded to a report of a man firing a shot in a gym and leaving. When police confronted Ly-Bishop, a shootout occurred which left him dead. |
| 2025-02-26 | Jonathan Mark Robins (55) | White | Leachville, Arkansas | Leachville officers responded to a shots fired report. Upon arrival, Robins opened fire on them from the windows, and barricaded himself inside the residence. After a 9 hour standoff, he ran to an open carport of an adjoining home with a gun and a knife, opening fire on officers again. Responding ASP troopers returned fire, killing him. The two troopers who were involved the shooting were justified by county attorney. |
| 2025-02-26 | Sei-Jah Rivera (21) | Pacific Islander | Chatsworth, California | A high speed pursuit ended in a cul-de-sac in Winnetka. According to CHP, the suspect was under influence of opiates and armed with a gun before being fatally shot by a trooper.The trooper involved wasn't wearing a bodycam, only pictures from dashcam footage available. |
| 2025-02-25 | Akugaq Leavitt (41) | Native American | Utqiagvik, Alaska | An officer shot and killed Leavitt during a domestic violence call at a home. Police said the officer shot Leavitt after he refused to follow commands and attempted to reenter the home. |
| 2025-02-25 | Claudio Sanchez (47) | Hispanic | Ooltewah, Tennessee | |
| 2025-02-25 | Cole L. M. Turner (15) | White | Bloomington, Illinois | Police responded to reports of an armed person. Police stated that "As the call for service progressed, the officer(s) fired their duty weapon(s), and the subject was struck." Further details were not released. |
| 2025-02-25 | Adam Javonta Sykes (31) | Unknown | Indianapolis, Indiana | Officers were responding to a report of a woman who was allegedly assaulted by multiple people when one of the responding officers noticed a man who he believed had an active arrest warrant. The officer attempted to talk with the man, but the man refused and walked away, and at some point one of the responding officers deployed his taser at the suspect, and the incident ended in gunfire where the suspect was declared deceased at an area hospital. |
| 2025-02-24 | Roman Huerta (28) | Unknown | Victorville, California | |
| 2025-02-24 | Steven M. Carter (44) | White | Rockholds, Kentucky | KSP with Barbourville police officers were executing an arrest warrant on Carter. During the encounter, a trooper shot and killed him as he was armed with a firearm. |
| 2025-02-24 | Jesus Armando Mendez Berry (26) | Hispanic | Fond du Lac, Wisconsin | Deputies found an armed man who had a felony warrant and ordered him to follow commands but he reportedly refused. One of the deputies discharged a less-lethal device but it was ineffective. The suspect then produced a handgun, prompting the second deputy to shoot and kill him. |
| 2025-02-24 | Jamar Brooks (34) | Black | Kingwood, Texas | Brooks was in custody for felony charges and was injured. San Jacinto Police stated that when a deputy was loosening his leg restraints, Brooks started a fight, trying to gain control of the deputy's handgun. The deputy eventually fatally shot him. |
| 2025-02-24 | Bernardo Mares (24) | Hispanic | Garland, Texas | Two Garland officers were wounded during an ambush as they responded to a shots fired call. After shooting them, Mares fled and ambushed another officer then went into a house. Police stated that Mares charged from the house while pointing an object at officers in a shooter stance before being fatally shot. |
| 2025-02-23 | Benjamin Raymond (58) | White | Albuquerque, New Mexico | APD officers responded to a domestic violence report and discovered a convicted felon, Raymond, who was armed at the time. He struggled with the officers for his gun during the arrest. Eventually, he gained control of his pistol and pointed it at the officers, who shot and killed him.The footage was released. |
| 2025-02-23 | Lawrence Thomas Devilbiss (55) | White | Anderson, South Carolina | Devilbiss was stopped by an Anderson County deputy for his suspicious behavior. The deputy shot and killed him after he pulled out a gun. |
| 2025-02-23 | Brian Hilt (33) | White | Kansas City, Kansas | Police were called to an apartment where the suspect broke in and was armed with a firearm, the suspect was fatally shot after he allegedly disregarded commands to drop his weapon. |
| 2025-02-22 | Sebastian Smoye Noisy (25) | Black | Pembroke Pines, Florida | Officers pepper sprayed and tasered a man who reportedly trespassed in a marsh with dangerous wildlife after he became agitated and didn't follow orders. The man later died in a hospital. |
| 2025-02-22 | Johnny Mayfield (23) | Black | Henderson, North Carolina | A Vance County deputy stopped Mayfield, who had several outstanding orders. After a car pursuit and foot chases, he reportedly lunged toward the deputy with a broken glass bottle before being shot. |
| 2025-02-22 | Vicente Manzo Hernandez (30) | Hispanic | Sioux City, Iowa | Officers stopped Hernandez during a traffic stop for his felony arrest warrant. He resisted arrest before being shot. His death was announced two days later. The footage had been released. |
| 2025-02-22 | Diogenes Archangel-Ortiz (49) | Black | York, Pennsylvania | Archangel-Ortiz entered the University of Pittsburgh Medical Center Memorial Hospital in York and took staff members hostage with a handgun. When officers arrived, Archangel-Ortiz fired at them. West York Officer Andrew Duarte was killed by police friendly fire in the shoot-out. Two other officers and three hospital staff members were injured in the shoot-out before Archangel-Ortiz was fatally shot by responding officers. |
| 2025-02-22 | Andrew Duarte (30) | White | York, Pennsylvania | Archangel-Ortiz entered the University of Pittsburgh Medical Center Memorial Hospital in York and took staff members hostage with a handgun. When officers arrived, Archangel-Ortiz fired at them. West York Officer Andrew Duarte was killed by police friendly fire in the shoot-out. Two other officers and three hospital staff members were injured in the shoot-out before Archangel-Ortiz was fatally shot by responding officers. |
| 2025-02-21 | Michael Boyd Powers (49) | Unknown | Newton, Texas | Newton County deputies attempted to serve a felony warrant on a suspect, who then fled with a tool box. When they located the man, he showed up with a gun from the tool box and pointed it at them. Deputies then shot and killed him. |
| 2025-02-21 | David C. West (44) | White | Piqua, Ohio | Piqua officers responded a domestic violence report. Upon arrival, West, in the basement, stated that he had a gun and refused to go upstairs. At some point, one of the officers saw he pointed the pistol at them and he fatally shot West. |
| 2025-02-21 | Antonio Chez Scippio (33) | Black | Orlando, Florida | Orange County responded to a report of a man claiming he intended to commit suicide. When they arrived, the man, Scippio, approached the deputies with a knife and refused to drop before he was shot. He underwent surgery but later died.The footage was released in March. |
| 2025-02-21 | Puipuia Lipoi Alaelua (41) | Pacific Islander | Anchorage, Alaska | Alaelua held a woman and her four children hostage at a hotel after APD responded to a stolen vehicle report. A shot were fired by the suspect during the incident. SWAT team members later broke into the room and fatally shot the suspect after he used the woman hostage as a shield while pointing a gun at her. Officers involved were cleared by the Office of Special Prosecutions.The footage was released. Alaelua's brother Utuva Alaelua was later shot and killed by Anchorage Police in May. |
| 2025-02-20 | Allen Dale Warner Jr. (26) | Native American | Madras, Oregon | Madras Police officers fatally shot Warner after responding a street fight. An eye witness video depicted that an officer dropped what looks like a less-lethal shotgun when he was retreating. Warner picked it up then dropped it before the fatal shooting. Police confirmed was armed with a knife when he was shot.The footage was released. |
| 2025-02-19 | Jayden Stephenson (21) | White | Miamisburg, Ohio | Stephenson was threatening his family members with a knife. Police used less-lethal tactics but he still did not drop the knife. He then moved toward police officers with it before being fatally shot.The footage was released. |
| 2025-02-19 | Dominic Garcia (31) | Unknown | Phoenix, Arizona | Gracia fled on foot after a traffic stop for speeding. He was later located in a recycling bin and refused to comply and fired shots at officers. They returned fire, killing him. Less-lethal devices were deployed before he was shot.The footage was released. |
| 2025-02-18 | Cora Elizabeth Cartrette (45) | White | Leland, North Carolina | A Brunswick Country Sheriff's vehicle was responding to a call with lights and sirens on. Cartrette, who was driving in the oncoming lane, made a left turn at the intersection. The deputy failed to stop at the red light, which caused the fatal collision. |
| 2025-02-18 | Surafel Zerihun (29) | Black | Washington, D.C. | Zerihun reportedly smashed his car into a Metropolitan Police car, charged at an officer with a knife, and demanded the officer's sidearm. The officer then shot him. When the officer checked on him, he got up and started swinging the knife at officers and broke into a police car then tried to carjack another woman's car. Police then shot him again, killing him. |
| 2025-02-18 | Emil Williams (79) | Black | New York City, New York | Williams, a physician's assistant, was reported missing by family members on February 18. That evening, he approached an NYPD officer outside a precinct in Queens and pointed a gun at him. More officers responded, with four fatally shooting Williams. |
| 2025-02-18 | Nathan Keesler (47) | White | Concord, California | Concord Police officers shot dead a man who was actively stabbing his family member during a domestic dispute. The victim survived.Officer involved Shooting Concord, CA on YouTube |
| 2025-02-17 | unidentified male | Unknown | San Jacinto, California | State police shot and killed a man who was reportedly throwing rocks at passing cars. |
| 2025-02-17 | John Spencer (67) | White | Crescent City, California | An officer shot and killed Spencer after responding to a report about a man armed with a gun. Details are limited at the time. |
| 2025-02-17 | unidentified male (41) | Hispanic | Alice, Texas | Alice Police officers responded to a residence. A man inside pointed a rifle at them and refused to drop before being shot and killed. |
| 2025-02-17 | Justin M. Barbour (28) | Black | Crozet, Virginia | Barbour entered a Harris Teeter parking lot wielding a rifle and fatally shot a man exiting the store. He then shot and killed a woman sitting in a nearby vehicle. An off-duty federal officer heard the gunfire and killed Barbour in a shoot-out. |
| 2025-02-17 | Daniel Long (39) | White | Chillicothe, Ohio | |
| 2025-02-17 | Marcus Leonard Smith (39) | Black | Akron, Ohio | Officers tried to pull over a white Toyota Camry that had been reported stolen. Smith, the driver of the vehicle, allegedly shot at the officers, who returned fire and killed him. |
| 2025-02-16 | unidentified male (34) | Black | Barstow, California | |
| 2025-02-16 | Jaylon Robinson (18) | Black | Flowood, Mississippi | Officers attempted to conduct a traffic stop on a vehicle where a passenger got out of the vehicle and allegedly shot at one of the officers. The officers then returned fire, killing the suspect. |
| 2025-02-16 | Michael Aper (36) | White | Prescott, Arizona | Yavapai County deputies responded to a shots fired report. They claimed Aper threatened their lives before they shot him. |
| 2025-02-15 | Derrick Wardle (45) | White | Colorado Springs, Colorado | Police were responding a family disturbance involving an armed suspect, the police involved would later fatally shoot the suspect after they allegedly raised their gun at them. |
| 2025-02-14 | Lyle J. Cessna (52) | Unknown | East Vandergrift, Pennsylvania | Police raided a home and shot Cessna in unclear circumstances. He died in hospital on March 3. |
| 2025-02-13 | unidentified male | Unknown | Martinsburg, West Virginia | |
| 2025-02-13 | Daniel J. Bonnet (27) | Unknown | Independence, Missouri | Bonnet fled a traffic stop which led to a pursuit. He later crashed his vehicle and led police on a foot pursuit. During which he fired a gun at police before being fatally shot. |
| 2025-02-12 | Gerald Neal (56) | Black | Orlando, Florida | During a high speed pursuit, the fleeing suspect crashed into a utility pole and struck Neal, who was unrelated. Another responding officer also hit Neal with his patrol car, ultimately killing him. |
| 2025-02-12 | Mark Ryan (52) | White | Port Huron Township, Michigan | During a domestic altercation investigation, state troopers shot and killed a man who failed to drop the weapon and made threats. |
| 2025-02-12 | Derek Wayne Beach (37) | White | Lincoln, Maine | Police responded to a report about a man, Beach, violating a protection order. They tased Beach after negotiation efforts failed. Beach then lunged at them with a knife before officers shot him. |
| 2025-02-12 | Leo Warren Reeves (31) | White | Lillington, North Carolina | A Harnett County deputy responded to a call and found Reeves, who was armed with a knife. He advanced toward the officer with the knife before being fatally shot. |
| 2025-02-12 | Jeffrey Chapman (58) | Unknown | Reno, Nevada | Chapman was fatally shot after brandishing a weapon and charging at officers. FBI is currently investigating. |
| 2025-02-12 | Isaiah Walker Stott (24) | Black | Milwaukee, Wisconsin | Milwaukee Police officers were called an busy intersection on Milwaukee's West Side after receiving reports that Stott was firing a rifle. When they ordered the man to drop it, he fired at them, striking an officer. The other officer returned fire, killing the man. The wounded officer suffered serious injuries. |
| 2025-02-11 | David Garcia (41) | Unknown | Gilbert, Arizona | |
| 2025-02-11 | Max Justin Marlatt (32) | White | Albuquerque, New Mexico | Bernalillo County Sheriff’s deputies responded to a report of a stolen vehicle and found out that the driver had an out-of-state felony warrant. When they made contact with the driver, a shooting incident occurred which he was fatally shot.Police released the footage during a news conference. |
| 2025-02-10 | Martinez Greenlee III (19) | Black | Norcross, Georgia | A pedestrian was struck and killed by a marked patrol car. |
| 2025-02-10 | Abdulrahman Ali (25) | Black | Gonzales, Louisiana | |
| 2025-02-10 | Tommy Lee Spurlock (29) | White | Cookeville, Tennessee | |
| 2025-02-09 | Kupa'a Ke'a (31) | Pacific Islander | Reno, Nevada | Police pursued Ke'a by vehicle after they responded to a domestic violence call. He was shot by officers outside of Renown Regional Medical Center after he allegedly brandished a handgun. Ke'a was taken to hospital and died of his wounds on February 15. |
| 2025-02-09 | Giorgi Merabishvili (33) | Unknown | Stanton, Tennessee | Merabishvili reportedly stabbed an individual at a Pilot Travel gas station. For reasons currently unknown, a Fayette County Sheriff's deputy that responded to the scene shot Merabishvili. |
| 2025-02-08 | Moises Cruz (23) | Hispanic | Susquehanna Township, Dauphin County, Pennsylvania | Cruz was driving a stolen vehicle and failed to stop at a red light, colliding with a police car. He was killed during the incident. |
| 2025-02-08 | Jalin Seabron (23) | Black | Highlands Ranch, Colorado | Police responded to an active shooter call at an arcade and fatally shot Seabron, who police said was armed. A woman was arrested for the shooting, which injured another woman. Police later said Seabron was not involved with the earlier shooting. |
| 2025-02-08 | Robert Brewer Heaverlo (31) | White | Yakima, Washington | Police responded to a call of a man armed with a rifle in a hotel lobby. The man was shot and killed after an armed confrontation ensued. |
| 2025-02-08 | Jose Luis Lopez-Lopez (26) | Hispanic | Pine Castle, Florida | Lopez-Lopez called police to report his co-worker had broken into his home. When deputies arrived, they encountered Lopez-Lopez and his co-worker fighting. Deputies yelled at Lopez-Lopez to drop a knife before shooting him, but no knife was found on the scene. |
| 2025-02-08 | unidentified male | Unknown | Brighton, Colorado | The suspect reportedly assaulted one of his family members to death and was involved in an armed carjacking. When Adams County deputies confronted him, he fired a gun at them and was shot to death. |
| 2025-02-07 | Linda Becerra Moran (30) | Hispanic | Los Angeles, California | Becerra Moran called police to a motel in the Pacoima neighborhood to report she was a victim of sex trafficking. Responding deputies shot her after she slowly approached them holding a knife. Becerra Moran was hospitalized on life support. Several weeks later, the ethnics committee of the hospital took Becerra Moran off life support after attempts to reach family members in Ecuador were unsuccessful. |
| 2025-02-07 | Lester Isbill (74) | White | Monroe County, Tennessee | Seven Monroe County Justice Center employees were indicted, including officers and jail staffs, after the in custody death of Isbill was ruled a homicide. Isbill was arrested on a low-level misdemeanor warrant. Jail staffs put him in a restraint chair shortly after when he fell face-first. He later died of dehydration and the effects of being restrained. |
| 2025-02-07 | Tri-Marea Rayquan Charles (25) | Black | Titusville, Florida | |
| 2025-02-06 | David Leroy Kintz Jr. (43) | White | Des Moines, Iowa | The decedent threatened officers with a screwdriver before being shot. |
| 2025-02-06 | Dominic Caroway (44) | Black | Quincy, Florida | A Gadsden County gas station robbery suspect shot dead two and injured two, which led to a manhunt. Caroway, of Avondale, Arizona, ended up crashing after a pursuit. He was fatally shot by SWAT team members after shooting one of the deputies. |
| 2025-02-06 | Michael O'Banner (62) | Black | Brooksville, Florida | During a traffic stop attempt, O'Banner fled on foot and was later caught by a Hernando County deputy. A violent physical altercation ensued and tasers were not effective. The deputy then fatally shot him. The deputy sustained injuries during the incident. |
| 2025-02-06 | Cesar Vasquez-Vega (26) | Hispanic | Birmingham, Alabama | Vasquez-Vega, a motorcyclist, died after colliding with a BPD police cruiser. |
| 2025-02-06 | Nathaniel Moreno (19) | Hispanic | San Antonio, Texas | Officers spotted a stolen vehicle and used spike strips on it. When they surrounded the vehicle, one of the men refused to stop and began backing up, ramming other cars. Two officers opened fire in response, striking the two men. The vehicle later struck a building and caught on fire. One of the men died at the scene, another eventually died a few days later. |
| 2025-02-06 | Nicholas Rodriguez (15) | Hispanic | San Antonio, Texas | Officers spotted a stolen vehicle and used spike strips on it. When they surrounded the vehicle, one of the men refused to stop and began backing up, ramming other cars. Two officers opened fire in response, striking the two men. The vehicle later struck a building and caught on fire. One of the men died at the scene, another eventually died a few days later. |
| 2025-02-05 | Darius Brewer (29) | Black | Mexia, Texas | Mexia Police were met by gunfire after responding to a shots fired report. A gunfight ensued and the gunman, Brewer, retreated to a nearby residence, which resulted a barricade situation. SWAT team later found him dead inside, sustaining gunshot wounds during the shootout. |
| 2025-02-05 | Maurice Jones (33) | Black | Pittsburgh, Pennsylvania | |
| 2025-02-05 | Billy Joe Porter (65) | White | Davin, West Virginia | Troopers were responding to a hostage situation where they fatally shot the suspect when he raised his gun at the hostage after they tried to escape. |
| 2025-02-04 | Rinaldo Bankston (54) | Black | Memphis, Tennessee | |
| 2025-02-04 | Jose De Jesus Mendez (51) | Hispanic | Richmond, California | The suspect was wanted by police on a probation violation warrant connected to domestic violence charges. Richmond officers shot and killed the suspect after a standoff took place. Mendez charged at them with a sheath which used to be a knife. A few still images from the bodycam were released after a California Public Records Act request from Richmondside News. |
| 2025-02-04 | Christopher “Grant” Hulgan (44) | White | Hoover, Alabama | |
| 2025-02-04 | Alexander Mathis (25) | Black | North Las Vegas, Nevada | Officer Jason Roscow responded to a call of a man brandishing a gun at a resident. When he encountered Mathis, Mathis refused to comply and shot him, he returned fire, killing Mathis. Officer Roscow succumbed to his injuries a few hours after the incident. |
| 2025-02-04 | Francis Rochon (33) | Native American | Anchorage, Alaska | An Anchorage Police officer saw a man pointing a gun at cars and people after responding to calls regarding the armed man's behavior. The officer shot and killed the man after ordering him to drop the gun. |
| 2025-02-03 | Elisha Colbert (51) | White | Bossier City, Louisiana | Colbert lunged at officers with a knife and was shot. Police said they were responding to a 911 hang-up call. |
| 2025-02-03 | Isaac Cannon (20) | Black | Pomona, California | LASD responded to a call about a gunman chasing two men. Cannon, who matched the description, reportedly produced a firearm and was shot dead by deputies. |
| 2025-02-03 | Geoffrey Barton (57) | White | Claremont, California | Barton produced a handgun and was shot dead by deputies after they responded to a family disturbance report. |
| 2025-02-03 | Steven Righini (29) | White | Portage Lake, Maine | Officers were responding to a domestic dispute between the suspect and a woman. The suspect then fatally shot a police K9 in the abdomen, the suspect was then fatally shot by police after he allegedly pointed the gun at them. |
| 2025-02-03 | Manuel Bonilla-Gomez (68) | Hispanic | Norwalk, Connecticut | Gomez, a Bicyclist, was struck and killed by an Norwalk Police officer driving an unmarked police vehicle at an intersection. |
| 2025-02-03 | Brian Timothy Kada Jr. (36) | White | Philadelphia, Pennsylvania | A police officer assigned to patrolling the Philadelphia International Airport encountered a man, who had been a victim of a stabbing, on a freeway on-ramp. The officer then called for EMS and police back-up. While the man and the officer waited for the arrival of other first responders, a fight transpired between the man and the officer. The officer reportedly attempted to Taser the man to no avail. The man was then shot multiple times by a second Philadelphia police officer arriving to the scene. |
| 2025-02-02 | Kurt K. Kilbert (28) | Black | Chicago, Illinois | CPD officers responded to a burglary in progress report and encountered the suspect. They exchanged fire at multiple nearby locations. The suspect was eventually killed by returned fire. |
| 2025-02-01 | Macayla Deponte (20) | Pacific Islander | Pukalani, Hawaii | Police responded to an abuse report and were told Deponte had barricaded herself inside a room with a knife. Officers fatally shot Deponte after she allegedly raised the knife and walked towards them. |
| 2025-02-01 | Imanol Salvador Gonzalez (19) | Hispanic | Tustin, California | An off-duty officer who was intoxicated struck and killed a man with his car. Orange County DA has charged the sergeant with one felony count of driving under the influence of alcohol causing great bodily injury and one felony count of hit and run with permanent injury or death. |
| 2025-02-01 | Jonnie Bartholomew (22) | Unknown | Sacramento, California | |
| 2025-02-01 | Jose Velasquez (45) | Hispanic | Newport Beach, California | Santa Ana Police pursued a homicide suspect after spotting him in a vehicle. A shootout then occurred in Newport Beach, where the suspect was shot dead. |
| 2025-02-01 | Timothy T. Turner (37) | Black | Columbia, Missouri | A man, suspected of being involved in a homicide, was fatally shot by police at a house. Police claim the man was shot because he "posed a threat to police and the inhabitants" inside the home. |

== See also ==
- Death in custody § United States
- Henry A. Wallace Police Crime Public Database
- List of cases of police brutality
- List of countries with annual rates and counts for killings by law enforcement officers
- List of law enforcement officers killed in the line of duty in the United States
- List of law enforcement officers convicted for an on-duty killing in the United States
- List of shootings by US immigration agents
- List of police reforms related to the George Floyd protests
- List of unarmed African Americans killed by law enforcement officers in the United States
- Lists of killings by law enforcement officers
- Police brutality in the United States
- Police misconduct § United States
- Police riot § United States
- Police use of deadly force in the United States
