= Baileysville, West Virginia =

Community in West Virginia, US

Coordinates: 37°35′21″N 81°40′45″W

Baileysville is an unincorporated community in Wyoming County, West Virginia, United States. Most of the town was purchased by the United States Army Corps of Engineers in the 1960s and 1970s for construction of the R. D. Bailey Lake. The Post Office was closed in 1973. The geographic name lived on in the local high school, Baileysville High School, which served a regional area and was actually located outside of the town proper. The school was closed in 2002 after consolidating with nearby Oceana High to form Westside High School.

here is some more history the town was founded in the late 1800's by James Bailey.

the newest edition to the town was the middle and elementary school that was built in 1974.

the town was actually where the dam is now the town was moved from the area when they started building the dam.

The community has the name of James Bailey Sr., a local pioneer.
