= Westside High School (West Virginia) =

Location
- West Virginia Route 971; Clear Fork, West Virginia 24870; United States; 37.656355°N 81.663016°W

Information
- School type: Public
- Established: 2002
- School district: Wyoming County Schools
- CEEB code: 490283
- Principal: Katie Endicott
- Teaching staff: 28.58 (FTE)
- Grades: 9-12
- Enrollment: 557 (as of 2023-2024)
- Student to teacher ratio: 19.49
- Colors: Black; Silver
- Athletics: Football, Volleyball, Cheerleading, Boys and Girls Basketball, Marching Band, Golf, Fishing Tennis, Softball, Baseball, Track, and Cross Country
- Mascot: Renegade
- Team name: Westside Renegades
- Website: http://whs.wyom.k12.wv.us/

Westside High School is a consolidated regional high school in Clear Fork, West Virginia, serving the western half of Wyoming County, West Virginia. It opened in 2002 and consolidated the former Oceana High School and Baileysville High School, also taking in about one-third of the attendance area of the former Glen Rogers High School, which had been merged into Oceana several years earlier.

The school was originally to be named "Wyoming West" to match the county's other consolidated school, Wyoming East High School, but students voted on the Westside name.

== Athletics ==
=== State Championships ===
Listed below are all championships won by Westside High School.

	State Championship(s)	State Runner-Ups
Sport	Year(s)	Year(s)
Boys Basketball		2005 (AA)
Girls Basketball	2012 (AA), 2014 (AA)	2013 (AA)
Cheer	2025 (AA)
