= Davin, West Virginia =

Unincorporated community in West Virginia, United States

- Unincorporated community
- Location within West Virginia Location within the United States
- Coordinates: 37°43′54″N 81°49′45″W
- Country: United States
- State: West Virginia
- County: Logan
- Elevation: 807 ft (246 m)

Population (06/2014)
  - Total: 683
- Time zone: UTC-5 (Eastern (EST))
  - Summer (DST): UTC-4 (EDT)
- ZIP code: 25617
- Area codes: 304 & 681
- GNIS feature ID: 1554262

Davin is an unincorporated community in Logan County, West Virginia, United States. Davin is located on West Virginia Route 10 and Huff Creek, 3 miles (4.8 km) east-southeast of Man. Davin has a post office with ZIP code 25617. Davin's population is counted as part of the Mallory census-designated place.

The community was named after H. A. Davin, a railroad official.
