= Melissa, West Virginia =

- Unincorporated community
- Location within West Virginia Location within the United States
- Coordinates: 38°22′48″N 82°20′05″W
- Country: United States
- State: West Virginia
- County: Cabell
- Elevation: 577 ft (176 m)
- Time zone: UTC-5 (Eastern (EST))
  - Summer (DST): UTC-4 (EDT)
- Area codes: 304 & 681
- GNIS feature ID: 1543116

Melissa is an unincorporated community in Cabell County, West Virginia, United States. Melissa is located at the junction of West Virginia Route 10 and West Virginia Route 10 Alternate, 3 miles (4.8 km) southwest of Barboursville.
