= Huff Creek (West Virginia) =

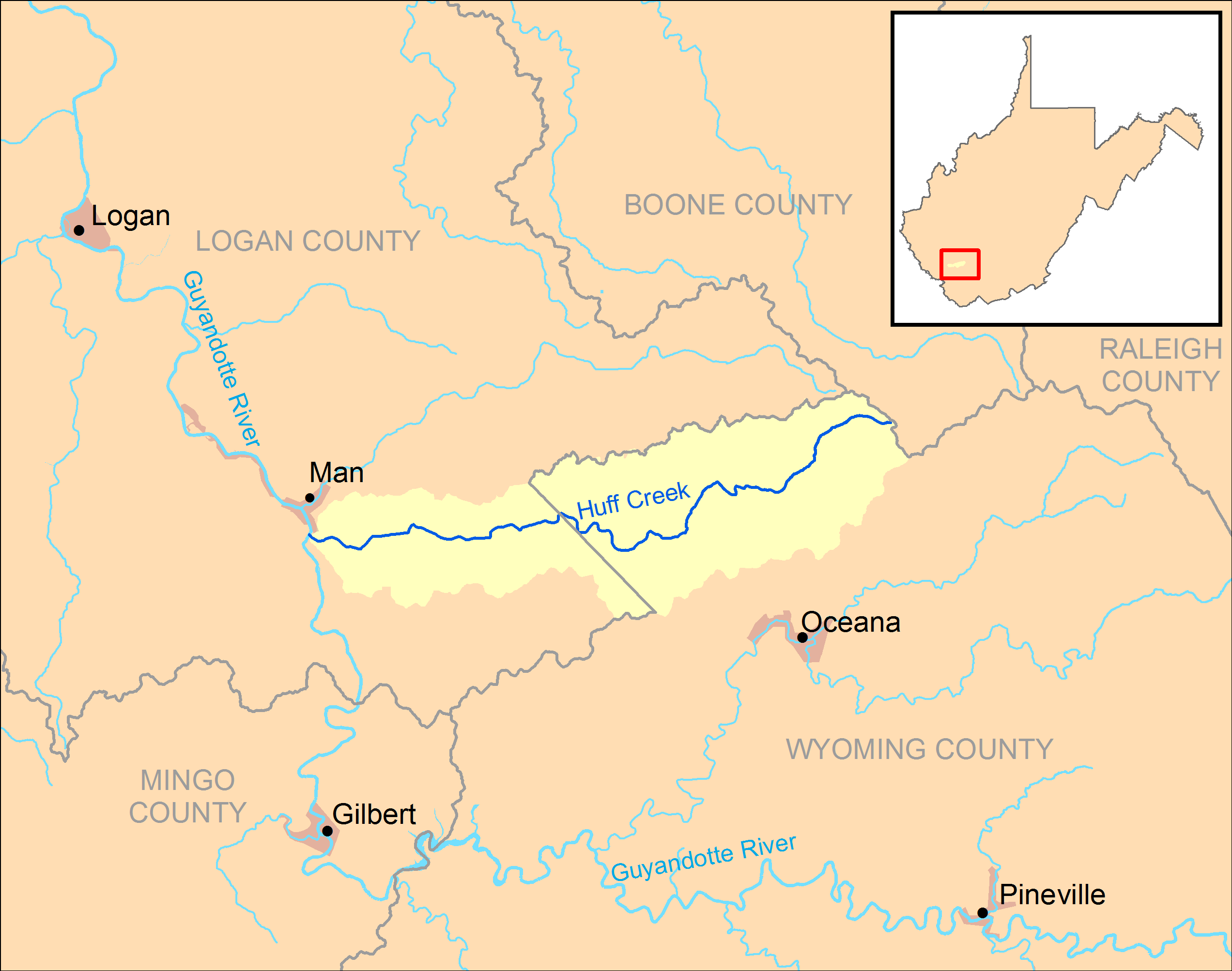
- Huff Creek and its watershed in Logan and Wyoming Counties, West Virginia.

Location
- Country: United States
- State: West Virginia
- Counties: Wyoming, Logan

Physical characteristics
- Source
  - location: northwest of Kopperston
  - coordinates: 37.7764993°N 81.5837203°W
  - elevation: 2,549 ft (777 m)
- Mouth: Guyandotte River
  - location: Huff Junction
  - coordinates: 37.7303852°N 81.8731744°W
  - elevation: 735 ft (224 m)
- Length: 21.2 mi (34.1 km)
- Basin size: 52 sq mi (130 km^{2})

Huff Creek is a tributary of the Guyandotte River, 21.2 miles (34.1 km) long, in southern West Virginia in the United States. Via the Guyandotte and Ohio rivers, it is part of the watershed of the Mississippi River, draining an area of 52 square miles (130 km^{2}) in a rural area on the unglaciated portion of the Allegheny Plateau. The creek was named after Peter Huff, an early settler.

Huff Creek rises in northern Wyoming County, approximately 2 miles (3.2 km) northwest of Kopperston, and flows generally westward through the unincorporated communities of Lacoma, Cyclone, and Campus in Wyoming County; and Gillman Bottom, Claypool, Mineral City, Davin, and Mallory in Logan County, to Huff Junction, where it flows into the Guyandotte River from the east, approximately 1 mile (1.6 km) southeast of the town of Man. Downstream from Lacoma, the creek is paralleled by West Virginia Route 10.

According to the West Virginia Department of Environmental Protection, approximately 97% of the Huff Creek watershed is forested, mostly deciduous.

== See also ==
- List of rivers of West Virginia
