= Oxyana =

- Film poster
- Directed by: Sean Dunne
- Produced by: Colby Glenn, Nadine Brown
- Cinematography: Hillary Spera
- Edited by: Kathy Gatto
- Release date: April 19, 2013 (Tribeca)
- Running time: 77 minutes
- Country: United States
- Language: English

Oxyana is a 2013 documentary film produced and directed by Sean Dunne. The film documents prescription drug abuse in rural Southern West Virginia, based in the town of Oceana and surrounding Wyoming County. The film highlights the abuse of the prescription drug oxycodone. It was released in April 2013 at the Tribeca Film Festival.

== Synopsis ==
Oceana was once a coal mining town that prospered, but in recent years, has been faced with poverty and addiction. Oxycodone's introduction to the town in the early 1990s has led to widespread addiction. Many residents are involved in the drug trade, with one woman in the video stating "you either work in the mines or sell pills." The film further portrays the effects drugs have had on individual families.
