= Smokeless, West Virginia =

Smokeless
- Unincorporated community
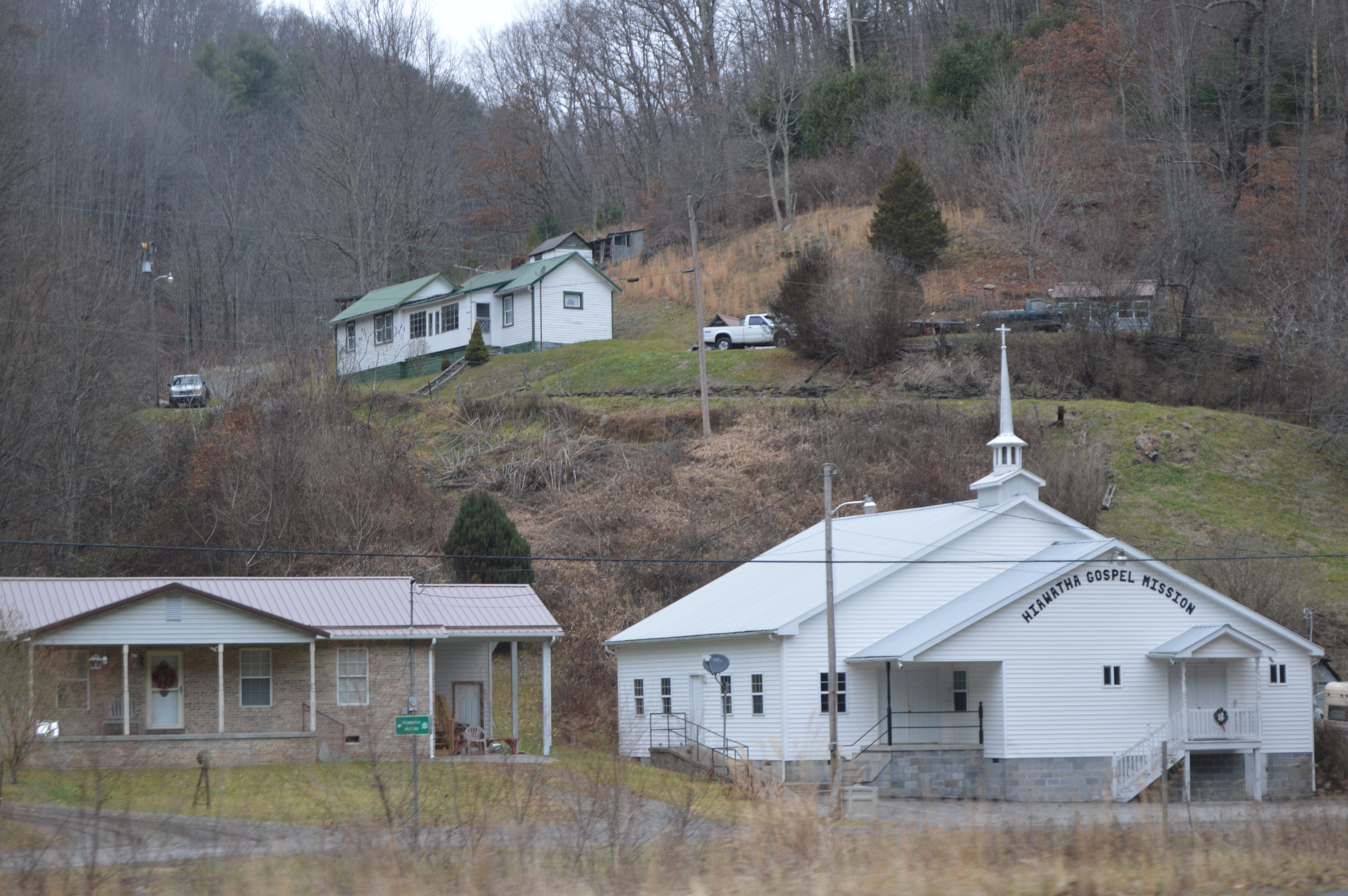
- Houses and a church seen from West Virginia Route 10

- Location within the state of West Virginia Smokeless (the United States)
- Coordinates: 37°25′57″N 81°15′4″W
- Country: United States
- State: West Virginia
- County: Mercer
- Elevation: 2,395 ft (730 m)
- Time zone: UTC-5 (Eastern (EST))
  - Summer (DST): UTC-4 (EDT)
- GNIS ID: 1549601

Smokeless is an unincorporated community in Mercer County, West Virginia, United States. The community took its name from the local Smokeless Coal Company. Smokeless is on West Virginia Route 10.
