= Lillydale, Wyoming County, West Virginia =

Community in West Virginia, US

Lillydale, West Virginia
- Unincorporated community
- Location within West Virginia Location within the United States
- Coordinates: 37°40′34″N 81°39′47″W
- Country: United States
- State: West Virginia
- County: Wyoming
- Elevation: 1,224 ft (373 m)
- Time zone: UTC-5 (Eastern (EST))
  - Summer (DST): UTC-4 (EDT)
- Area codes: 304 & 681
- GNIS feature ID: 1541964

Lillydale is an unincorporated community in Wyoming County, West Virginia, United States. Lillydale is located on West Virginia Route 971 along the Clear Fork, 2.5 miles (4.0 km) southwest of Oceana.
