= Jamie Lester =

American artist (born1974)

- Born: Oceana, West Virginia, US
- Education: West Virginia University
- Known for: Sculpture, painting

Jamie Darrell Lester is an American artist best known for creating ceramic, bronze, and steel sculptures that “focus on the human figure combined with imagery derived primarily from life in Appalachia, including birds, architecture, and landscape.” Lester also creates paintings, digital art, and music.

== Sculpture ==
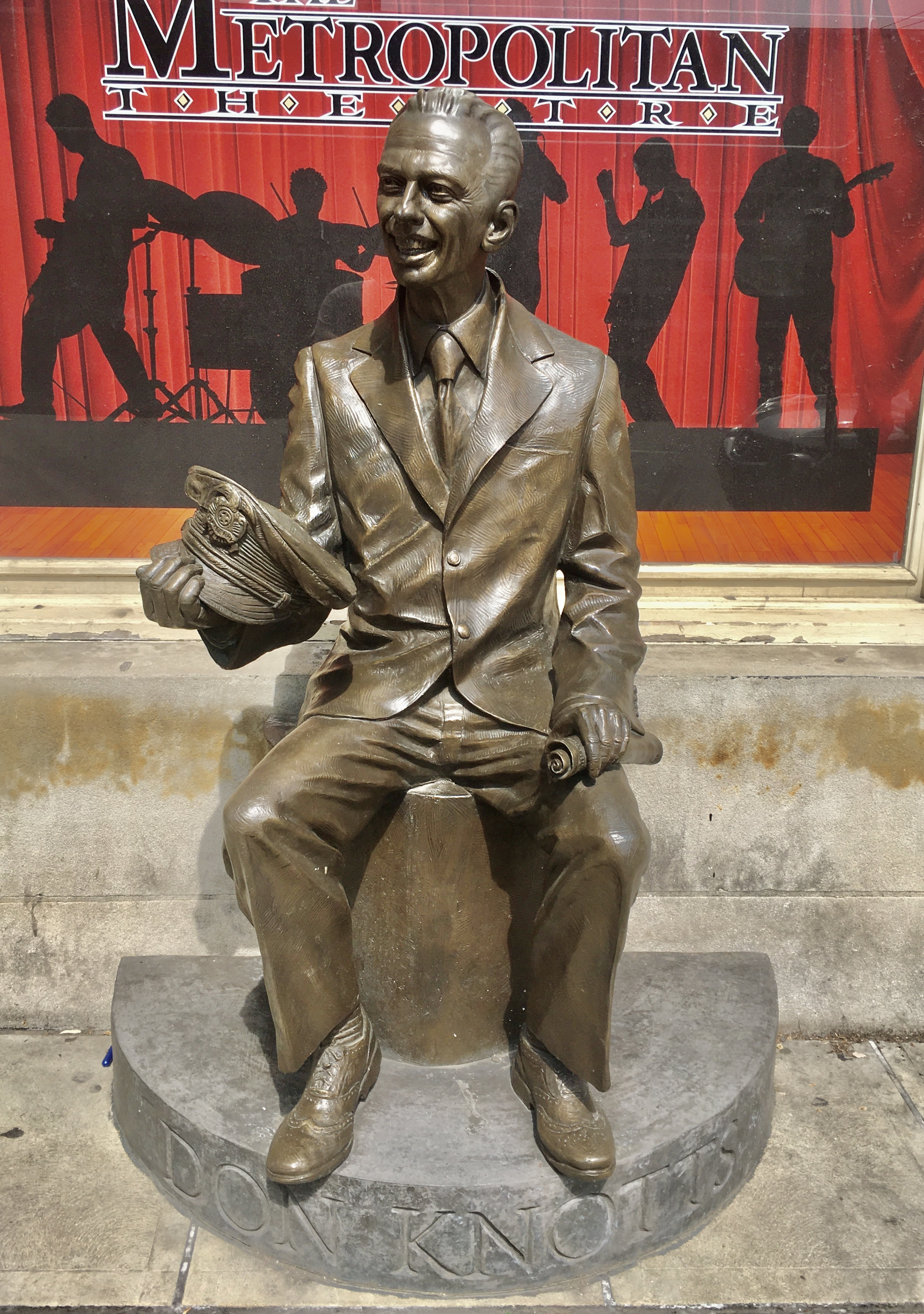
Don Knotts statue at Metropolitan Theatre, Morgantown, West Virginia

Lester's award-winning sculptures have been shown in galleries in Maryland, Massachusetts, West Virginia, and the United Kingdom. Many of his sculptures have been produced as commissioned public works, including statues of frontiersman Davy Crockett, (outside the Tennessee State Capitol building in Nashville, Tennessee, 2026), actor Don Knotts (in front of the Metropolitan Theatre in Morgantown, West Virginia, 2016), basketball player and executive Jerry West (outside the West Virginia University Coliseum, Morgantown, West Virginia, 2007), George Steinbrenner in Monument Park (Yankee Stadium), New York City, and the Brooklyn Wall of Remembrance at MCU Park in the Coney Island neighborhood of Brooklyn, NY.

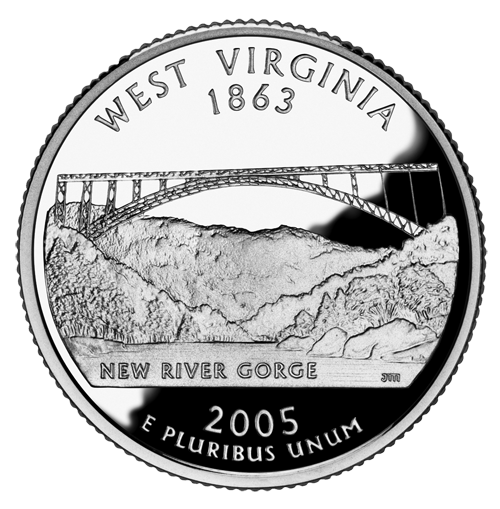
Obverse designed by Jamie Lester

In 2003, Lester designed the obverse side of the West Virginia state quarter issued as part of the US Mint's 50 State quarters program in 2005. The design features the New River Gorge Bridge.

Each year, Lester creates bronze-relief busts representing new inductees to the World Golf Hall of Fame in St. Augustine, Florida.

As of August 2021, Lester had also created over 30 statues for the Boy Scouts of America, each of which are installed at the Summit Bechtel Reserve, near Beckley, WV. Among these is a statue of Rex Tillerson, the former United States Secretary of State who served as President of the Boy Scouts of America from 2010 to 2012.

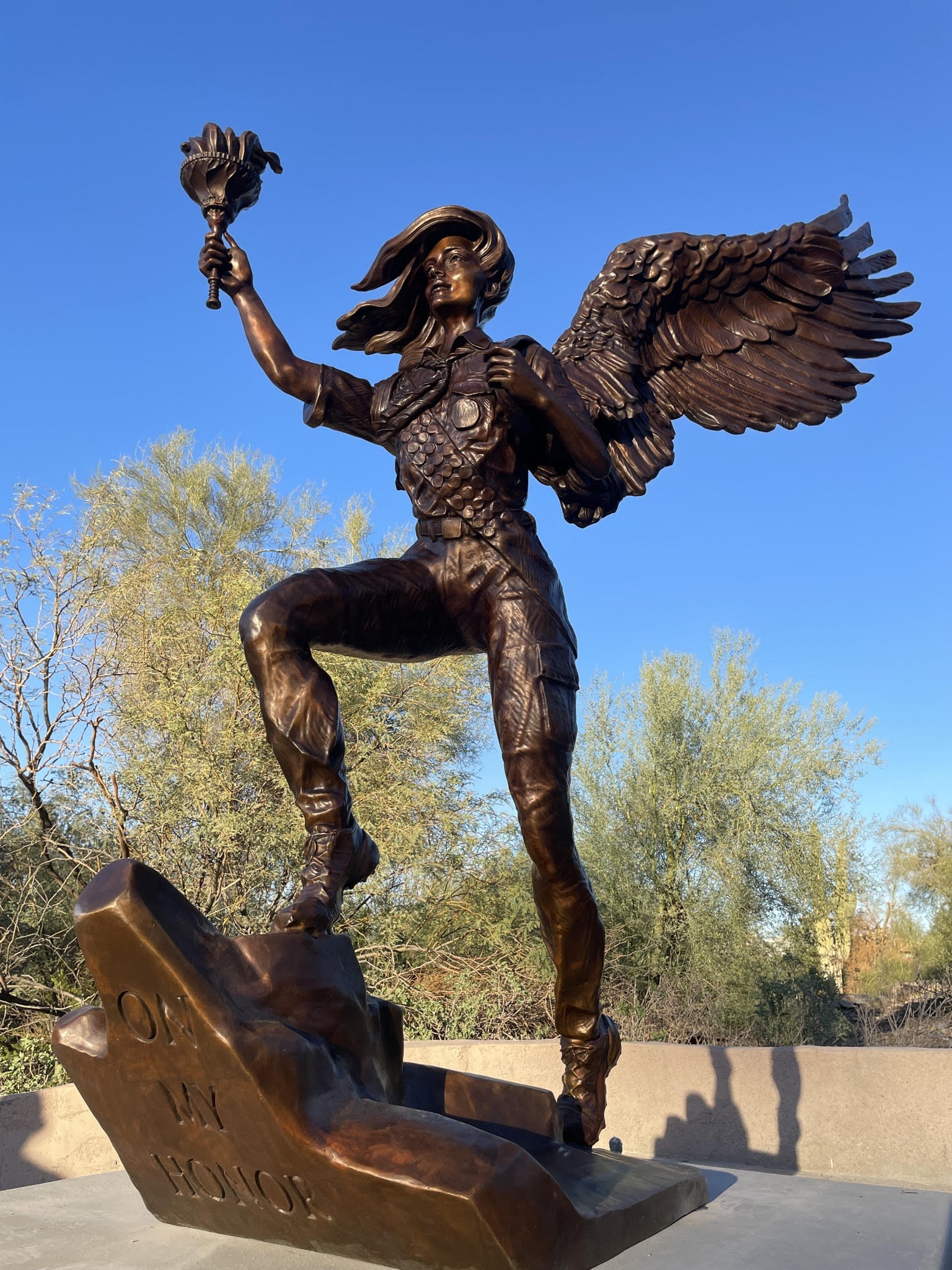
Ascending Eagle by Jamie Lester, at the Summit Bechtel Reserve

In July 2023, the Boy Scouts of America announced the unveiling and dedication of Lester's bronze "Ascending Eagle" statue as part of Scouting's Women of Character Program, which ran concurrent with their 2023 National Jamboree. The 8-feet-tall statue located at the Summit Bechtel Reserve is intended to inspire past, current and future generations of girls and women involved in Scouting.

In 2025, Lester's design for ten-foot bronze statue of Davy Crockett, titled Guardian of the Frontier, was selected by the Tennessee State Capitol Commission to be placed outside the Tennessee State Capitol building at Nashville. Unveiled in November 2026, the statue shows Crockett standing on a stone with two dogs, while he holds his rifle. He wears pioneer garb and a coonskin cap.

Lester's Guardian of the Frontier stands outside the Tennessee State Capitol building at Nashville.

In 2026, Lester was selected to exhibit his work as part of the eighth edition of Personal Structures, the biennial contemporary art exhibition organized by the European Cultural Center (ECC), Italy. Lester's sculptures were chosen for a six-month exhibition alongside the Venice Biennale in the Marinaressa Gardens, Venice, beginning in May 2026.

Other notable works include "Rising Cardinals" (2021), which is located between Neville and North Heber Streets in Beckley, WV. This sculpture was part of a beautification project for the city. It features four red cardinals and was constructed with the help of Lester's business partner, engineer Jeff Edwards. During an interview conducted during the public unveiling of the work, Lester said he chose the state bird of West Virginia to symbolize Beckley “rising up.”

In an interview with Tamarack, Lester revealed that he not only sculpts in bronze, ceramics, steel, and mixed media, but also creates sculpture digitally and in virtual reality. His larger projects can take several years to complete. For example, Lester stated that he worked over 4,000 hours to create his rendering of Jerry West, while planning for his Don Knotts statue began nearly ten years before the final version was erected. Lester has stated that his artistic style is influenced by baroque, post-impressionism, and surrealism.

== Painting ==
Lester is also an accomplished painter whose works sometimes combine his figurative representations with Appalachian themes. For example, Lester created a series of watercolor paintings showing the faces of coal miners wearing miner's helmets, which was utilized in the non-profit public awareness campaign "Remember the Miners" that launched in 2010. A watercolor series Lester created in 2005 features giantized people amid Appalachian architecture.

== Early life and education ==
Born into a working-class family in Oceana, West Virginia, Lester began creating art at the age of three, due to the influence of his mother, a watercolor painter, and his father, a coal miner who introduced to him to whittling and fort building. Whittling and fort building, Lester explains, are "kind of sculptures."

Lester later attended West Virginia University and graduated with Bachelor of Fine Arts degree in 1997. He has continued his education by studying specific artists and styles. In 2015, Lester traveled to Rome, Italy, where he completed a course of study on the figurative sculpture of Gian Lorenzo Bernini. In 2011, he travelled to China, where he taught as a guest artist at the Jingdezhen Ceramic Institute. He also studied in the Chinese city of Hangzhou.

== Vandalia Bronze and Love Hope Center for the Arts ==
After graduating from West Virginia University in 1997, Lester founded Vandalia Bronze in Morgantown, WV. Aside from operating as Lester's workshop, Vandalia Bronze hosts the Nampara Arts Cooperative, which provides rentable space to ceramic artists, including equipment and kilns, and public instruction.

In 2021, Lester co-founded the Love Hope Center for the Arts, a non-profit educational space in Fayetteville, WV.
