= Lillyhaven, West Virginia =

Community in West Virginia, US

Lillyhaven
- Unincorporated community
- Location within the state of West Virginia Lillyhaven (the United States)
- Coordinates: 37°41′13″N 81°39′32″W
- Country: United States
- State: West Virginia
- County: Wyoming
- Elevation: 1,237 ft (377 m)
- Time zone: UTC-5 (Eastern (EST))
  - Summer (DST): UTC-4 (EDT)
- Area code: 304
- GNIS feature ID: 1541965

Lillyhaven is an unincorporated community in Wyoming County, West Virginia, United States, along the Clear Fork.
