= Huff Junction, West Virginia =

- Unincorporated community
- Location within West Virginia Location within the United States
- Coordinates: 37°43′54″N 81°52′9″W
- Country: United States
- State: West Virginia
- County: Logan
- Time zone: UTC-5 (Eastern (EST))
  - Summer (DST): UTC-4 (EDT)

Huff Junction is an unincorporated community in Logan County, West Virginia, United States, at the confluence of Huff Creek and the Guyandotte River. The eastern part of the community, along Green Branch Road, is part of the Mallory census-designated place. There are many businesses in this area.
