= Baileysville High School =

Former high school in Wyoming County, West Virginia

insert a caption here

Baileysville High School was a high school located in Wyoming County, West Virginia. It was closed in 2002 after consolidating with nearby Oceana High School to form Westside High School.

Baileysville High School's mascot was the Rough Rider and the school colors were red, white and blue with blue being the dominant color.

Feeder schools for Baileysville High School included Baileysville Elementary School and Huff Consolidated Elementary School and Coal Mt. Elementary.

== Notable alumni ==
- Jamie Noble, retired professional wrestler from the WWE
- Chris Cline, American coal baron and philanthropist
