= Oceana High School (West Virginia) =

Defunct school in West Virginia, United States

Oceana High School was a high school located in Wyoming County, West Virginia. It was closed in 2002 after consolidating with nearby Baileysville High School to form Westside High School.

== History ==
Oceana High School was built in 1950. In 1956, the school added four additional classrooms, at a cost of US$18,000. In 1959, a building was built for the school's band. In 1960, the school added a library and four classrooms at a cost of US$60,000. In 1967, the Wyoming County Board of Education allocated US$14,000 for an addition of two classrooms, increasing the school to 24 classrooms.

== School profile ==
Oceana High School's mascot was the Indian and the school colors were red and gray. Throughout its history, Oceana High School had a very prolific athletic department. Feeder schools for Oceana High School included Oceana Middle School, Matheny Elementary School, Kopperston Elementary School, Glen Fork Elementary School, Clear Fork Grade School (now Council on Aging) and Road Branch Elementary School.

== Sports ==
Oceana High School won the AA Boys State Basketball Championship in 1963, 1965 and 1994. The boys basketball team was AA State Runners Up in 1960 and 1993. The boys basketball team was the 2001 A State Runners Up and in 1949 were the State Class B Runners Up in Boys Basketball. In total, Oceana High School boys basketball accumulated 23 Sectional Titles, 14 Regional Titles, 4 State Runners Up and 3 State Championships before consolidation in 2002.

Oceana High School also had three AA State Runners Up appearances in Football. Those years were 1968, 1970 and 1971.

Oceana High School had one AA State title game appearance in baseball in 1997. They finished as the runner up. Oceana High School won back to back AA State Championships in Track and Field in 1972 and 1973.

== Notable alumni ==
- Joe Pendry a former American football coach. From 1971 until 2010, he was an assistant coach or offensive coordinator for multiple teams in both the collegiate and professional ranks.
