= Kopperston, West Virginia =

Community in West Virginia, US

Kopperston
- Census-designated place (CDP)
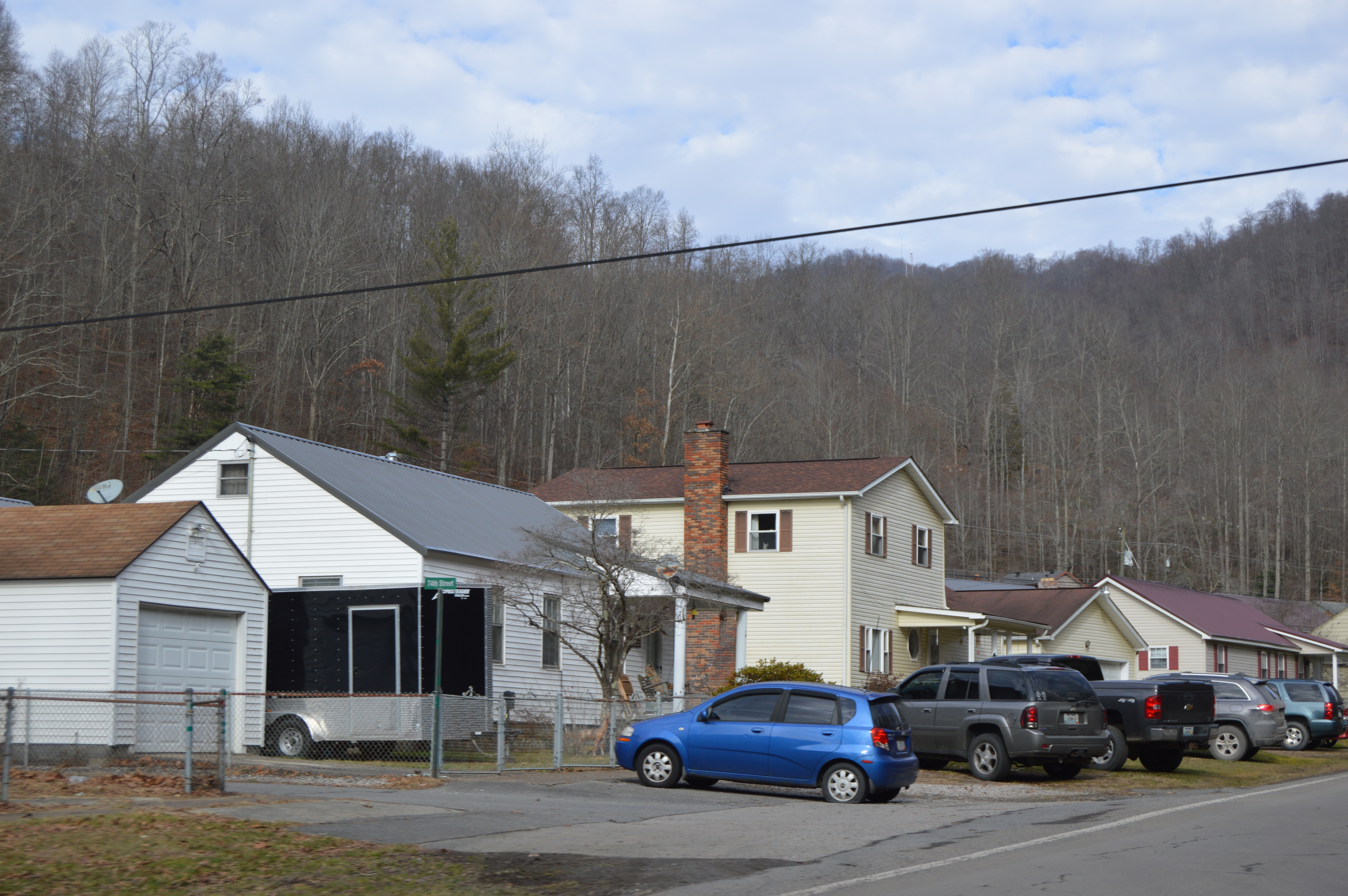
- WV 85 at 74th Street

- Location within the state of West Virginia
- Coordinates: 37°44′59″N 81°34′3″W
- Country: United States
- State: West Virginia
- County: Wyoming

Area
  - Total: 1.916 sq mi (4.96 km^{2})
  - Land: 1.907 sq mi (4.94 km^{2})
  - Water: 0.009 sq mi (0.023 km^{2})

Population (2020)
  - Total: 569
  - Density: 298/sq mi (115/km^{2})
- Time zone: UTC-5 (Eastern (EST))
  - Summer (DST): UTC-4 (EDT)
- ZIP codes: 24854

Kopperston (also Kopperstone) is a census-designated place (CDP) in Wyoming County, West Virginia, United States. Its elevation is 1,660 feet (510 m). Kopperston once had a post office, which closed on March 10, 2007. As of the 2020 census, its population was 569.

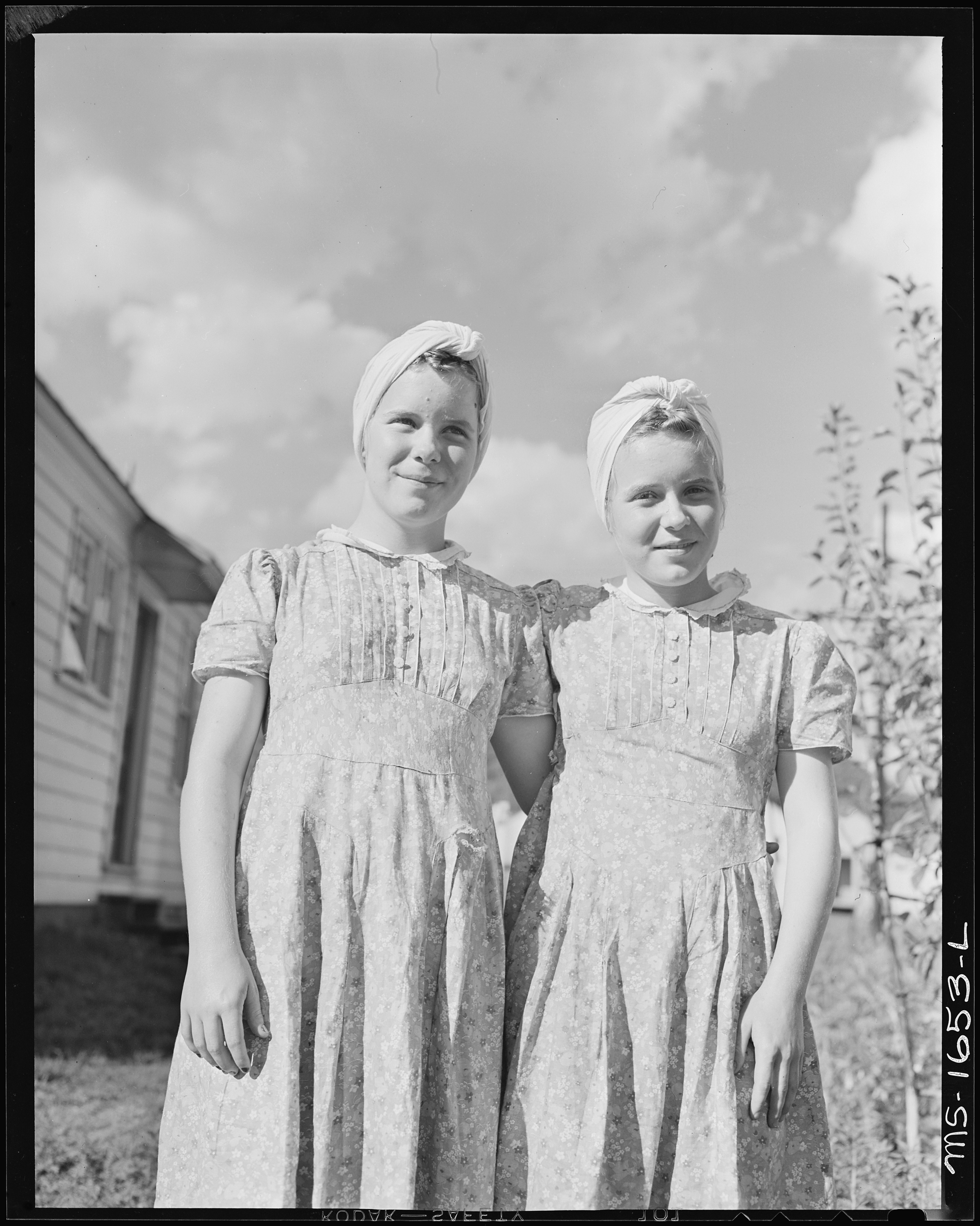
Twin daughters of miner. Koppers Coal Division, Kopperston Mine (19. August 1946)

== Climate ==
The climate in this area is characterized by hot, humid summers and generally mild to cool winters. According to the Köppen Climate Classification system, Kopperston has a humid subtropical climate, abbreviated "Cfa" on climate maps.
