= Clear Fork, West Virginia =

Community in West Virginia, US

Clear Fork
- Unincorporated community
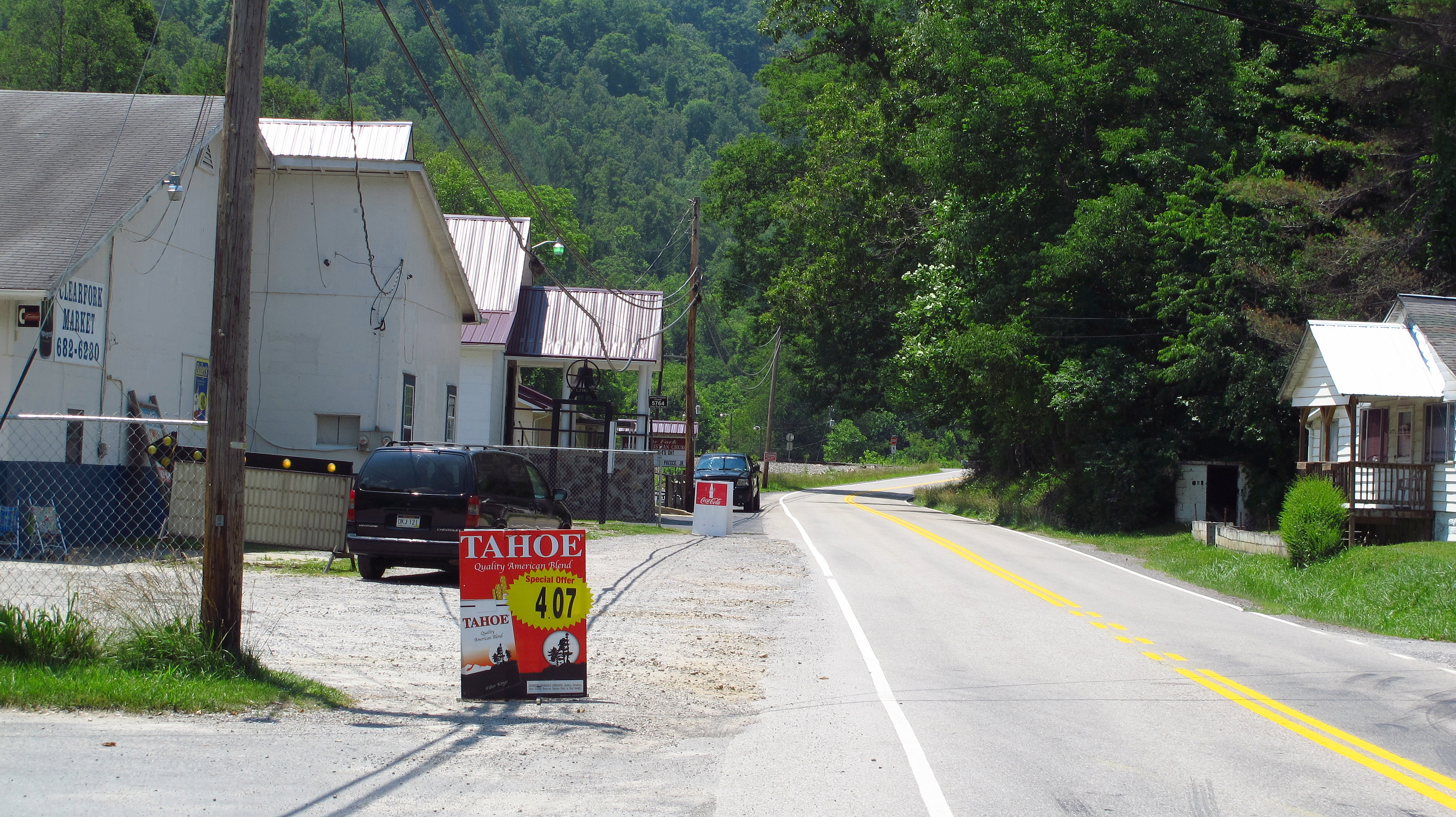
- Clear Fork

- Location within the state of West Virginia Clear Fork (the United States)
- Coordinates: 37°37′51″N 81°40′59″W
- Country: United States
- State: West Virginia
- County: Wyoming
- Time zone: UTC-5 (Eastern (EST))
  - Summer (DST): UTC-4 (EDT)
- ZIP codes: 24822
- Area code: 304
- GNIS feature ID: 1554143

Clear Fork is an unincorporated community in Wyoming County, West Virginia, United States, along the Clear Fork.
