= West Virginia Route 10 =

State highway in West Virginia, United States

West Virginia Route 10

Route information
- Maintained by WVDOH
- Length: 145 mi (233 km)

Major junctions
- South end: US 19 in Kegley
- WV 16 between Mullens and Pineville; WV 97 in Pineville; WV 85 in Oceana; WV 80 in Man; WV 73 in Logan; US 119 in Chapmanville; WV 3 in West Hamlin; I-64 at Huntington
- North end: US 60 in Huntington

Location
- Country: United States
- State: West Virginia
- Counties: Mercer, Wyoming, Logan, Lincoln, Cabell

Highway system
- West Virginia State Highway System; Interstate; US; State
← WV 9	→ US 11

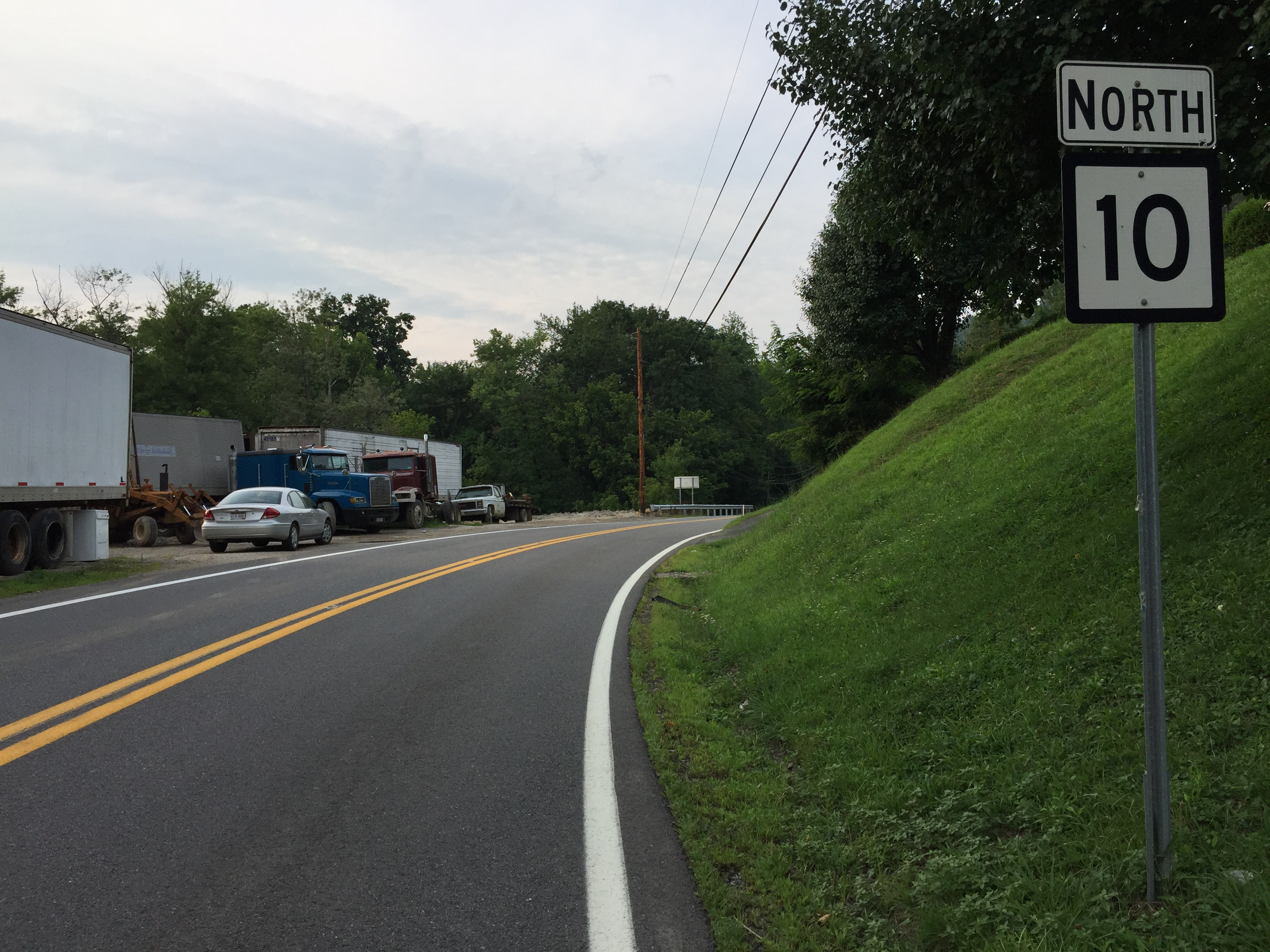
View north along WV 10 at WV 3 in West Hamlin

West Virginia Route 10 is a north–south route from Cabell County to Mercer County in the western and southern regions of West Virginia. Mostly a two-lane, winding highway with no shoulders, Route 10 is considered to be one of substandard design when compared to modern standards. Nevertheless, it serves as a major arterial highway in the state, carrying a substantial amount of traffic volume. Tractor-trailers have a particularly difficult time negotiating many of the route's sharp, hairpin curves.

Between the towns of West Hamlin and Man, most of the route closely parallels the course of the Guyandotte River. Thus, it follows a very winding course, with a solid rocks just inches from the roadway, and is thus very dangerous. An upgrade from Man to Logan to a four-lane highway built to the same standards as the Appalachian Corridor System was completed the first part of September 2017. From Man to Lacoma, the route follows Huff Creek, then turns south to Oceana. Then it follows a south-eastern path parallel to several small streams and terminates into US 19 just north of Princeton, West Virginia.

== Notes ==
In Huntington, portions of the highway are named Troy Brown Way and Hal Greer Boulevard in honor of two notable local professional athletes.

== Major intersections ==
County	Location	mi	km	Destinations	Notes
Mercer				US 19 – Princeton, Beckley	
Mercer	Matoaka			WV 71 south – Montcalm	
Wyoming				WV 16 north – Mullens	south end of WV 16 overlap
Wyoming	Pineville			WV 16 south – Welch	north end of WV 16 overlap
Wyoming	Pineville			WV 97 west – Gilbert	south end of WV 97 overlap
Wyoming	Pineville			WV 97 east – Beckley, Twin Falls Resort Park	north end of WV 97 overlap
Wyoming	Oceana			WV 85 north – Madison	
Wyoming	Oceana			WV 971 south – Baileysville	
Logan	Huff Junction			WV 80 south – Gilbert	
Logan	Man			CR 16 (Buffalo Creek Road) – Man	
Logan	Stollings			WV 17 north	south end of WV 17 Truck overlap
Logan	Stollings			WV 17 Truck north / CR 119/20 (Stollings By-pass Road)	north end of WV 17 Truck overlap
Logan				WV 73 west to US 119	
Logan				Mount Gay, Logan	
Logan	Chapmanville			US 119 – Logan	interchange
Lincoln				WV 37 west – Wayne, East Lynn Lake	
Lincoln	West Hamlin			WV 3 east – Hamlin	
Cabell	Melissa			WV 10 Alt. north – Barboursville	
Cabell	Huntington			I-64 – Ashland, KY, Charleston	I-64 exit 11
Cabell	Huntington			US 60 east (5th Avenue)	
Cabell	Huntington			US 60 west (3rd Avenue)	
1.000 mi = 1.609 km; 1.000 km = 0.621 mi: Concurrency terminus

== WV 10 Alternate ==
West Virginia Route 10 Alternate

Route information
- Maintained by WVDOH

Location
- Country: United States
- State: West Virginia

Highway system
- West Virginia State Highway System; Interstate; US; State

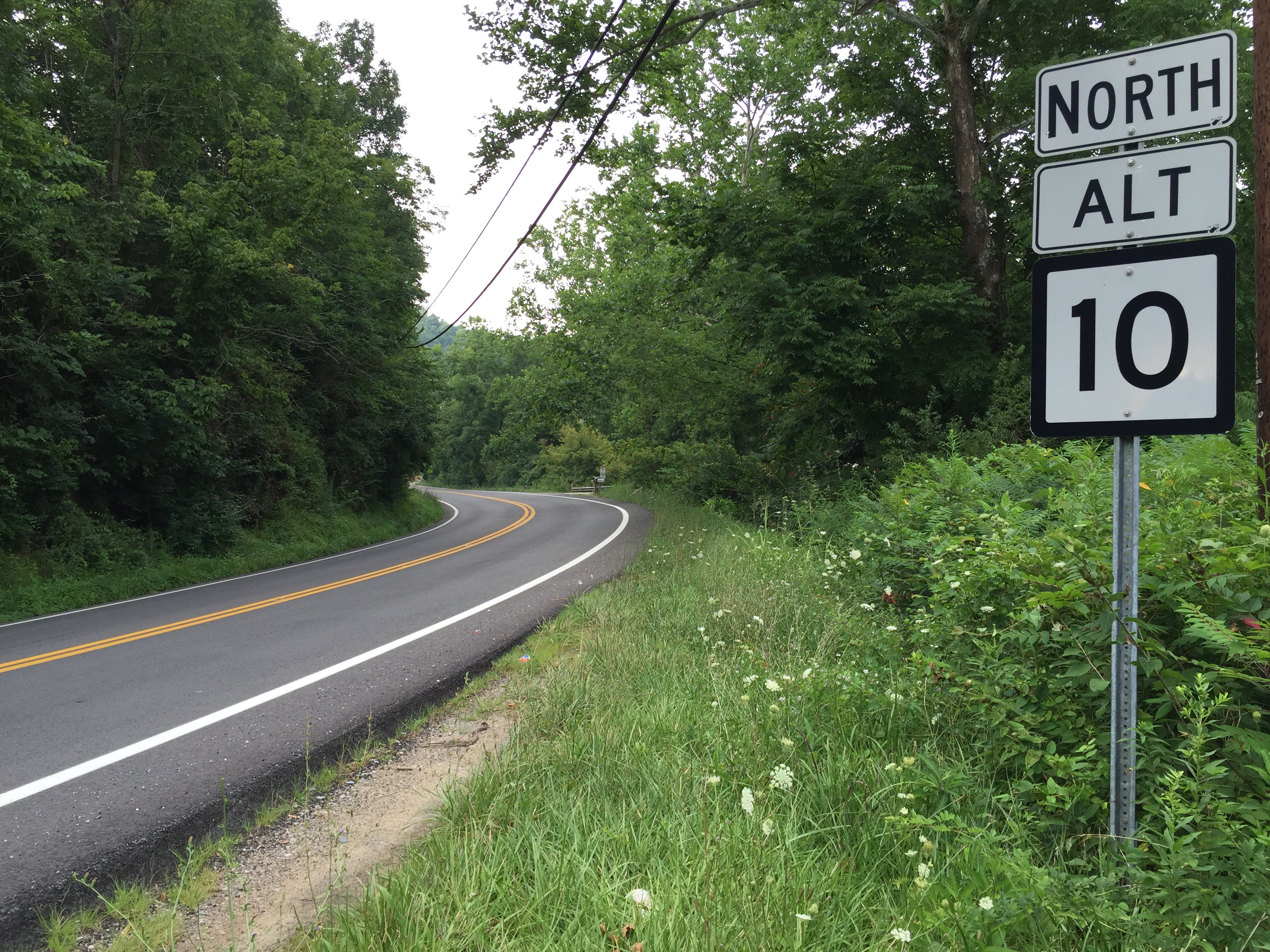
View north along WV 10 Alt. at WV 10 in Melissa

West Virginia Route 10 Alternate is a four-mile-long north–south road near Barboursville, West Virginia connecting WV 10 to the south and US 60 to the north. It acts as an alternative route to Huntington and eliminates many of the curves that plague WV 10 south of Interstate 64 to the WV 10 Alternate junction.
