= Oceana, West Virginia =

Town in West Virginia, US

- Town
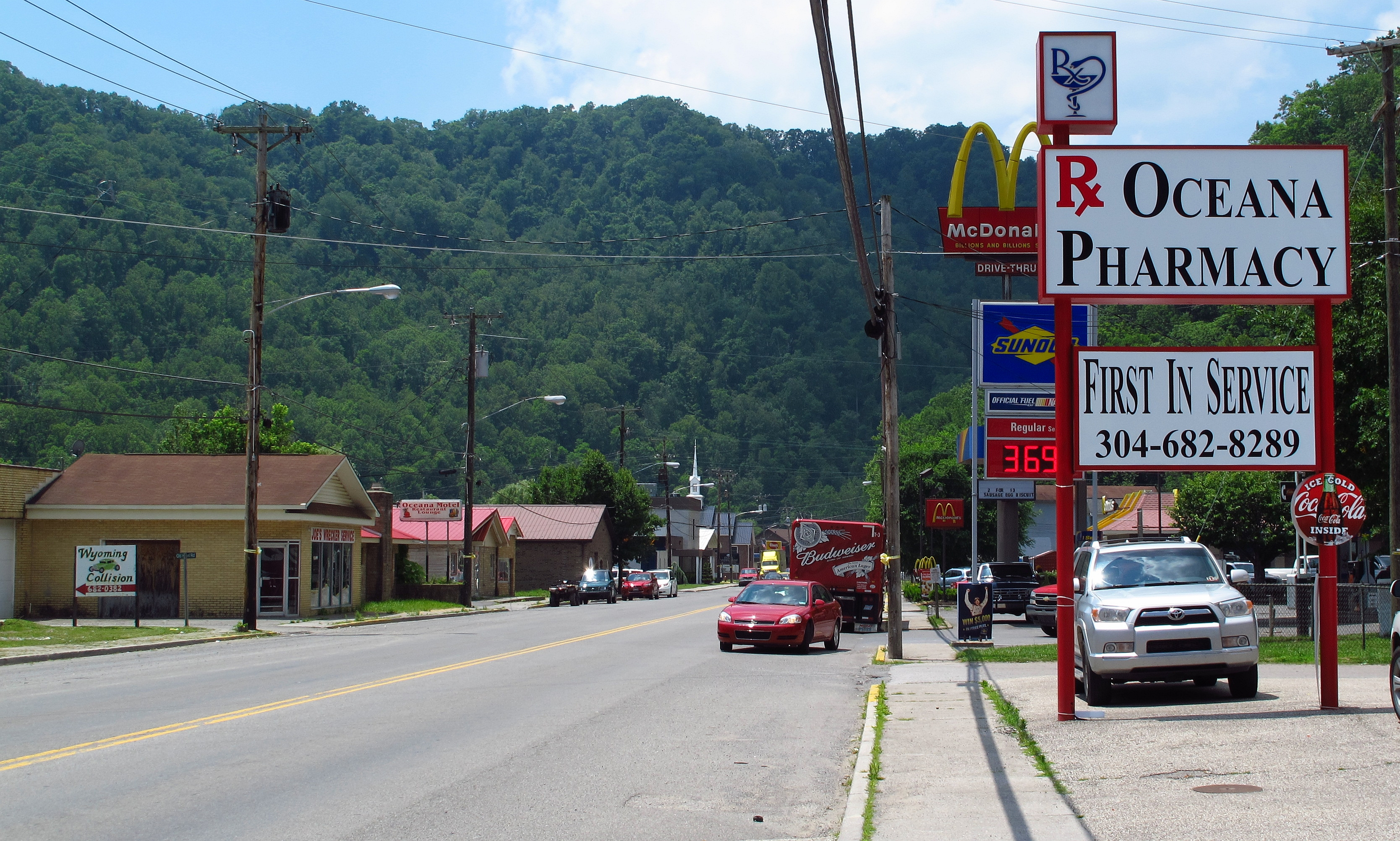
- Cook Parkway in Oceana

- Location of Oceana in Wyoming County, West Virginia.
- Coordinates: 37°41′35″N 81°38′4″W
- Country: United States
- State: West Virginia
- County: Wyoming

Area
  - Total: 1.33 sq mi (3.45 km^{2})
  - Land: 1.29 sq mi (3.34 km^{2})
  - Water: 0.039 sq mi (0.10 km^{2})
- Elevation: 1,263 ft (385 m)

Population (2020)
  - Total: 1,449
  - Estimate (2021): 1,441
  - Density: 932.2/sq mi (359.94/km^{2})
- Time zone: UTC-5 (Eastern (EST))
  - Summer (DST): UTC-4 (EDT)
- ZIP code: 24870
- Area codes: 304 & 681
- FIPS code: 54-60364
- GNIS feature ID: 1544323
- Website: www.oceanacityhall.com

Oceana is a town in Wyoming County, West Virginia. The population was 1,462 at the time of the 2020 census. Oceana is the oldest city in Wyoming County and was the county seat until 1907.

== History ==
Established in 1797 by early settler and Revolutionary War veteran John Cooke, it was county seat of Wyoming County until 1907, when Pineville was designated after a series of disputed elections.

== Geography ==
Oceana is located at 37°41′35″N 81°38′4″W (37.692976, -81.634386). The confluence of the Clear Fork and the Laurel Fork is in the town.

According to the United States Census Bureau, the town has a total area of 1.33 square miles (3.44 km^{2}), of which 1.29 square miles (3.34 km^{2}) is land and 0.04 square miles (0.10 km^{2}) is water.

=== Climate ===
The climate in this area is characterized by hot, humid summers and generally mild to cool winters. According to the Köppen Climate Classification system, Oceana has a humid subtropical climate, abbreviated "Cfa" on climate maps.

== Demographics ==
Historical population
Census	Pop.	Note	%±
1880	107		—
1950	1,373		—
1960	1,303		−5.1%
1970	1,580		21.3%
1980	2,143		35.6%
1990	1,791		−16.4%
2000	1,550		−13.5%
2010	1,394		−10.1%
2020	1,449		3.9%
2021 (est.)	1,441	▼	−0.6%
U.S. Decennial Census

=== 2010 census ===
As of the census of 2010, there were 1,394 people, 595 households, and 408 families living in the town. The population density was 1,080.6 inhabitants per square mile (417.2/km^{2}). There were 651 housing units at an average density of 504.7 per square mile (194.9/km^{2}). The racial makeup of the town was 97.5% White, 0.2% African American, 0.3% Native American, 0.1% Asian, 0.3% from other races, and 1.6% from two or more races. Hispanic or Latino of any race were 0.9% of the population.

There were 595 households, of which 29.4% had children under the age of 18 living with them, 52.4% were married couples living together, 12.6% had a female householder with no husband present, 3.5% had a male householder with no wife present, and 31.4% were non-families. 29.4% of all households were made up of individuals, and 14.1% had someone living alone who was 65 years of age or older. The average household size was 2.34 and the average family size was 2.84.

The median age in the town was 44.8 years. 21% of residents were under the age of 18; 7.1% were between the ages of 18 and 24; 22.4% were from 25 to 44; 31.2% were from 45 to 64; and 18.3% were 65 years of age or older. The gender makeup of the town was 48.6% male and 51.4% female.

=== 2000 census ===
As of the census of 2000, there were 1,550 people, 660 households, and 460 families living in the town. The population density was 1,163.4 inhabitants per square mile (450.0/km^{2}). There were 739 housing units at an average density of 554.7 per square mile (214.5/km^{2}). The racial makeup of the town was 98.65% White, 0.06% Native American, and 1.29% from two or more races. Hispanic or Latino of any race were 0.32% of the population.

There were 660 households, out of which 30.2% had children under the age of 18 living with them, 52.0% were married couples living together, 14.5% had a female householder with no husband present, and 30.2% were non-families. 28.6% of all households were made up of individuals, and 13.0% had someone living alone who was 65 years of age or older. The average household size was 2.35 and the average family size was 2.86.

In the town, the population was spread out, with 24.1% under the age of 18, 8.3% from 18 to 24, 26.7% from 25 to 44, 25.5% from 45 to 64, and 15.3% who were 65 years of age or older. The median age was 40 years. For every 100 females, there were 86.5 males. For every 100 females age 18 and over, there were 80.1 males.

The median income for a household in the town was $19,273, and the median income for a family was $25,938. Males had a median income of $36,016 versus $15,583 for females. The per capita income for the town was $11,925. About 27.2% of families and 33.5% of the population were below the poverty line, including 50.6% of those under age 18 and 19.7% of those age 65 or over.

== In popular culture ==
Oceana was the subject of the 2013 documentary film Oxyana, which portrayed a bleak picture of a community affected by widespread abuse of the prescription painkiller Oxycontin. The film premiered at the Tribeca Film Festival.

== Notable people ==
- C. Haley Bunn, prosecutor and justice of the Supreme Court of Appeals of West Virginia
- Edward T. England, attorney and congressman
- Daniel Hall, former member of the West Virginia Legislature
- Jamie Lester, artist known for bronze sculptures
