= Robert D. Bailey =

Robert D. Bailey may refer to:

- Robert D. Bailey Sr. (1883–1963), American judge involved in the Matewan Massacre trials
- Robert D. Bailey Jr. (1912–1994), West Virginia Secretary of State

== See also ==
- Robert Bailey (disambiguation)
- R. D. Bailey Lake, formed by a dam on the Guyandotte River and named after Robert D. Bailey, Sr.
