= Original affluent society =

Theory in anthropology

The "original affluent society" is the proposition that argues that the lives of hunter-gatherers can be seen as embedding a sufficient degree of material comfort and security to be considered affluent. The theory was first put forward in a paper presented by Marshall Sahlins at a famous symposium in 1966 entitled 'Man the Hunter'. Sahlins observes that affluence is the satisfaction of wants, "which may be 'easily satisfied' either by producing much or desiring little." Given a culture characterized by limited wants, Sahlins argued that hunter-gatherers were able to live 'affluently' through the relatively easy satisfaction of their material needs.

At the time of the symposium new research by anthropologists, such as Richard B. Lee's work on the ǃKung people of southern Africa, challenged popular notions that hunter-gatherer societies were always near the brink of starvation and continuously engaged in a struggle for survival. Sahlins gathered the data from these studies and used it to support a comprehensive argument that states that hunter-gatherers did not suffer from deprivation, but instead lived in a society in which "all the people's wants are easily satisfied."

== Overview ==
The basis of Sahlins’ argument is that hunter-gatherer societies are able to achieve affluence by desiring little and meeting those needs/desires with what is available to them. This he calls the "Zen road to affluence, which states that human material wants are finite and few, and technical means unchanging but on the whole adequate" (Sahlins, Original). This he compares to the western way towards affluence, which he terms as the "Galbraithean way" where "man's wants are great, not to say infinite, whereas his means are limited..." and "the gap between means and ends can eventually be narrowed by industrial productivity". Thus Sahlins argues that hunter-gatherer and western societies take separate roads to affluence, the former by desiring little, the latter by producing much. Through this comparison Sahlins also stresses that hunter-gatherer societies cannot be examined through an ethnocentric framework when measuring their affluence. For example, one cannot apply the general principles of economics (principles which reflect western values and emphasize surplus) to hunter-gatherers nor should one believe that the Neolithic Revolution brought unquestioned progress.

By stepping away from western notions of affluence, the theory of the original affluent society thus dispels notions about hunter-gatherer societies that were popular at the time of the symposium. Sahlins states that hunter-gatherers have a "marvelously varied diet" based on the abundance of the local flora and fauna. This demonstrates that hunter-gatherers do not exist on a mere subsistence economy but rather live among plenty. Through knowledge of their environment hunter-gatherers are able to change what foreigners may deem as meager and unreliable natural resources into rich subsistence resources. Through this they are able to effectively and efficiently provide for themselves and minimize the amount of time spent procuring food. "[T]he food quest is so successful that half the time the people do not know what to do with themselves". Hunter-gatherers also experience "affluence without abundance" as they simply meet their required ends and do not require surplus nor material possessions (as these would be a hindrance to their nomadic lifestyle). The lack of surplus also demonstrates that they trust their environment will continuously provide for them. By foraging only for their immediate needs among plentiful resources, hunter-gatherers are able to increase the amount of leisure time available to them. Thus, despite living in what western society deems to be material poverty, hunter-gatherer societies work less than people practicing other modes of subsistence while still providing for all their needs, and therefore increase their amount of leisure time. These are the reasons the original affluent society is that of the hunter-gatherer.

Through his thesis on the affluent society, Sahlins deconstructed the then popular notions that hunter-gatherers are primitive and constantly working hard to ward off starvation. However, one must take into consideration that there has been much progress in this field since 1966 and that ideas on the category of hunter-gatherer are always shifting, with new paradigms continuously emerging. One must also acknowledge that one cannot generalize about hunter-gatherer societies. Although they have been pushed to the margins of society, there are still many such societies in the world and they differ greatly from each other.

== "Work time" and "leisure time" ==
Sahlins' argument partly relies on studies undertaken by McCarthy and McArthur in Arnhem Land, and by Richard Borshay Lee among the ǃKung. These studies show that hunter-gatherers need only work about fifteen to twenty hours a week in order to survive and may devote the rest of their time to leisure. Lee did not include food preparation time in his study, arguing that "work" should be defined as the time spent gathering enough food for sustenance. When total time spent on food acquisition, processing, and cooking was added together, the estimate per week was 44.5 hours for men and 40.1 hours for women, but Lee added that this is still less than the total hours spent on work and housework in many modern Western households.

=== The three to five hour work day ===
Sahlins concludes that the hunter-gatherer only works three to five hours per adult worker each day in food production. Using data gathered from various foraging societies and quantitative surveys done among the Arnhem Landers of Australia and quantitative materials cataloged by Richard Lee on the Dobe Bushmen of the Kalahari, Sahlins argues that hunter-gatherer tribes are able to meet their needs through working roughly 15-20 hours per week or less.

== Criticism ==
Sahlins' theory has been challenged by a number of scholars in the field of anthropology and archaeology. Many have criticized his work for only including time spent hunting and gathering while omitting time spent on collecting firewood, food preparation, etc. Other scholars also assert that hunter-gatherer societies were not "affluent" but suffered from extremely high infant mortality, frequent disease, and perennial warfare. This appears to be true not only of historical foraging cultures, but also prehistoric and primeval ones.

David Kaplan collected references to several problems with the "Original Affluent Society" theory and especially the McCarthy and McArthur and Lee studies, including the definitions of "affluence," "work," and "leisure," the nutritional adequacy of the hunter-gatherer's diet, and the occurrence of "demand-sharing," the constant pressure to share as a disincentive to increased effort.

== See also ==
- 1948 American-Australian Scientific Expedition to Arnhem Land
- The Affluent Society
- Against the Grain: A Deep History of the Earliest States
- Anarcho-primitivism
- Distributism
- Eco-communalism
- Golden Age
- John Zerzan
- Primitive communism
- Society Against the State
- War Before Civilization
