= Kalahari Debate =

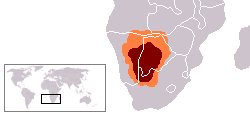
The Kalahari Desert Region

The Kalahari Debate began in the 1980s amongst anthropologists, archaeologists, and historians about how the San people and hunter-gatherer societies in southern Africa have lived in the past.

Richard Borshay Lee conducted early and extensive ethnographic research among a San community, the !Kung San. He and other traditionalists consider the San to have been, historically, isolated and independent hunter/gatherers separate from nearby societies. Wilmsen, Denbow and the revisionists oppose these views. They believe that the San have not always been an isolated community, but rather have played important economic roles in surrounding communities. They claim that over time the San have become a dispossessed and marginalized people. Traditionalists or "isolationist" scholars include Lee and Irven DeVore. The revisionists or "integrationist" scholars were led by Edwin Wilmsen and James Denbow.

Both sides use anthropological and archaeological evidence to support their position. They interpret cave paintings in Tsodilo Hills, and they also use artifacts such as faunal remains of cattle or sheep found at San sites. They even find Early Stone Age and Early Iron Age technologies at San sites, which both sides use to back their arguments.

== Traditionalists ==
The San are a relatively small group of people whose communities are scattered throughout the Kalahari Desert in southern Africa. They are well known for practising a hunter/gatherer subsistence strategy (also known as a "foraging" mode of production). Traditionalists, including Richard Lee and other anthropologists, view the San as maintaining this old but adaptable way of life, even in the face of changing external circumstances.

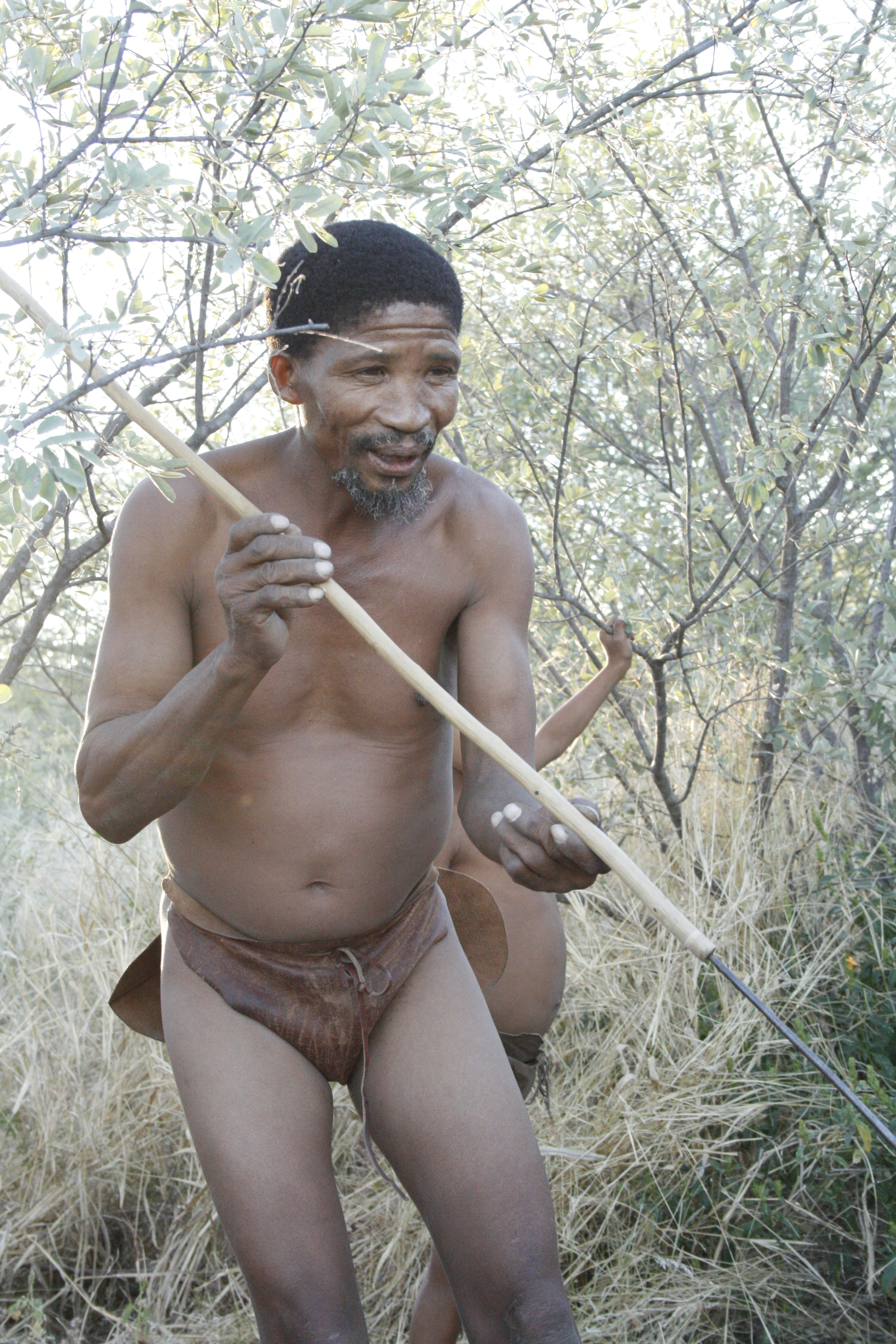
San Hunter

These anthropologists view the San as isolates who are not, and have never been, part of a greater Kalahari economy. The traditionalists believe that the San have adapted over time but without help from other societies. Emphasis is thereby placed on the cultural continuity and the cultural integrity of the San peoples.

In his 1979 book The !Kung San: Men, Women, and Work in a Foraging Society, Lee explains that his main goal was to be fully immersed in the !Kung San culture so that he could fully understand their way of life. He was puzzled as to how these people seemed to be living such an easy and happy life that relied heavily on hard work and the availability of food. Most of his studies of the San took place in the Dobe area, near the Tsodilo Hills. He was adopted into a kinship and given the name /Tontah which meant “White-Man.” He claims that the San were an isolated hunter-gatherer society that changed to farming and foraging at the end of the 1970s. Most of Lee's historical data comes from oral stories told by the !Kung San because they did not have anything written down. According to Lee the San were originally afraid of contact with outsiders.

Lee reports that the men did the hunting and hard labor while the women did housework. He later found out that the San weren't just hunter-gatherers, but also herders, foragers, and farmers. In his book he states, “I learned that most of the men had had experience herding cattle at some point in their lives and that many men had owned cattle and goats in the past.” He claims that they have learned all of this on their own. The San wanted wage pay for farming and taking care of cattle, goats, and sheep. This was their new way of life.

== Revisionists ==
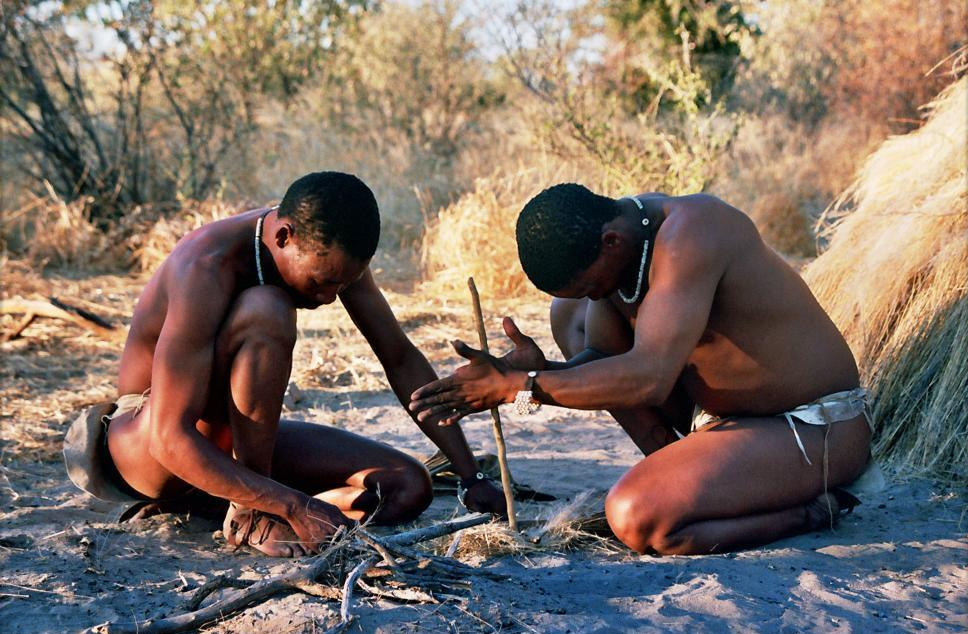
The San "Bushmen"

Edwin Wilmsen's 1989 book Land Filled With Flies kicked off the Kalahari Debate. Wilmsen made several remarks attacking anthropologists’ view of the San people. Most of his attacks were at Richard Lee and his work. Wilmsen made claims about the San such as, “Their appearance as foragers is a function of their relegations to an underclass in the playing out of historical processes that began before the current millennium and culminated in the early decades of this century.” This statement upsets the traditionalists because it says that the San are not isolates but have been an underclass in a society throughout history. Wilmsen makes another statement against the traditionalists when he says, “The isolation in which they are said to have been found is a creation of our own view of them, not of their history as they lived it.” He is beginning to say that anthropologists’ judgment is clouded because they already have a predisposed view of the San and hunter-gatherer societies as being isolates. Wilmsen states that the terms “Bushmen,” “Forager,” and “Hunter-Gatherer” contribute to the ideology of them being isolates. He says this is because these terms are commonly associated with isolated groups but his main claim is that for the San this is not the case. Wilmsen also goes on to claim that Lee approaches the San as a people without a history, that they have been doing the same thing forever. He states, “they are permitted antiquity while denied history” Wilmsen continues the argument that anthropologists’ goal is to study hunter-gatherer groups who have lived on their own for centuries, which builds a stereotype for hunter-gatherers. He believes this is why Richard Lee's views are flawed, and also why he is saying that the San are incorporated in a wider political economy in southern Africa.

The revisionists believe the !Kung were associated with Bantu-speaking overlords throughout history, and involved with merchant capital. They believe the San in the Kalahari are a classless society because they are actually the lower class of a greater Kalahari society. The revisionists believe the !Kung San were heavily involved in trade. They believe the San were transformed by centuries of contact with Iron Age, Bantu-speaking agro-pastoralists. This argues against the idea that they were a well-adapted hunter-gatherer culture, but instead advanced only through trade and help from nearby economies.

== Archaeological evidence ==
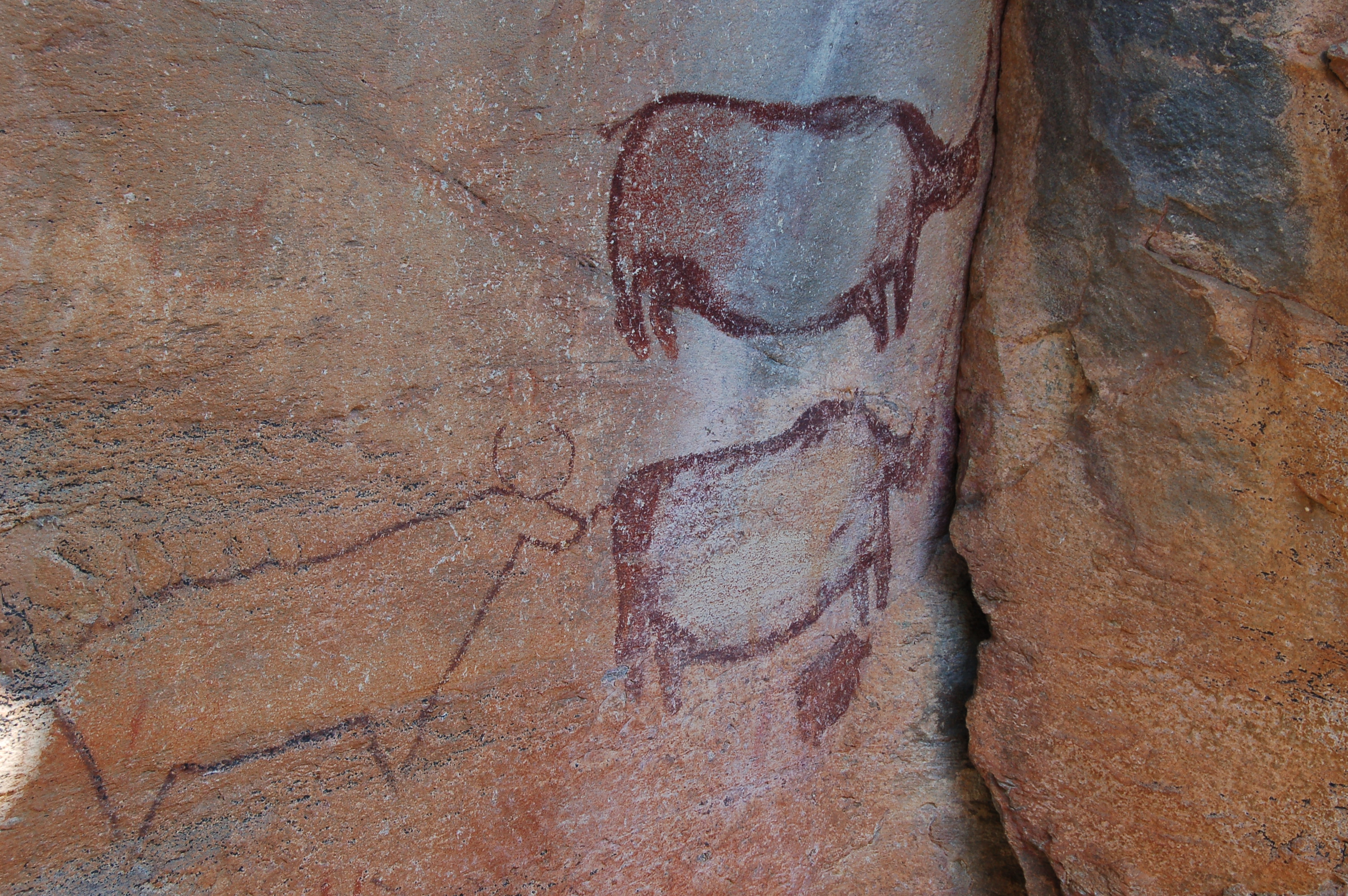
Tsodilo Rock Art

When it comes to archaeological evidence, much work still has yet to be done. However, artifacts and ecofacts have been found at southern African sites that could help prove the revisionist view of the San people. Their strongest supporting site is in the Tsodilo Hills, where rock art displays San looking over Bantu cattle. In the hills, there are 160 cattle pictures, 10 of which display stick figures near them.

Other evidence revisionists point to includes Early Iron Age products found in Later Stone Age sites. This includes metal and pottery found in the Dobe, Xia, and Botswana regions. Cow bones have also been found in northern Botswana, at Lotshitshi. These products are believed to be payment to the San for labor of caring for or possibly herding Bantu cattle.

== Continuing debates ==
The fuel of this debate is the constant back and forth critiquing by various scholars of each other's work. Wilmsen would say Lee is blinded by a pre-destined view of the San as isolates. Lee would counter-argue every point that Wilmsen would make, saying either that he made mistakes in research or presents conclusions with little evidence to support them.

One specific instance is where Lee called out Wilmsen for mistaking the word “oxen” for “onins”, which meant “onions” in an old map of the Kalahari region. This discovery would make the San herders before the arrival of the anthropologists in the 1950s and 1960s and not after the 1970s, as Lee believes. This instance gave rise to Lee's article "Oxen or Onions." In the article, Lee points out other flaws he believes he has found in Wilmsen's argument. Critiques of Wilmsen's work say that the cattle paintings could represent San stealing cattle rather than herding them. Another attack on Wilmsen's work was that the amounts of pottery and iron found in Dobe and Botswana regions were so small they could fit in one hand. The small numbers of these artifacts make some scholars believe they are insufficient to be able to make such a claim. The same is true of the cattle bones found in Botswana. The small numbers of cattle bone fragments found on San archaeological sites have made scholars question Wilmsen's argument.

== Bibliography ==
- Barnard, Alan “The Kalahari Debate: A Bibliographic Essay.” Edinburgh : Centre of African Studies, University of Edinburgh, (1992).
- Grauer, Victor A. "New perspectives on the Kalahari debate: A tale of two ‘genomes’." Before Farming 2 (2007): 1-14.
- Lee, Richard B., and Mathias Guenther. "Problems in Kalahari historical ethnography and the tolerance of error." History in Africa 20 (1993): 185–235.
- Sadr, Karim. "Kalahari Archaeology and the Bushman Debate." Current Anthropology 38, no. 1 (February 1997): 104. Science Reference Center, EBSCOhost.
