= Robert Bailey =

Robert Bailey may refer to:

- Rob Bailey (cricketer) (born 1963), English cricketer and umpire
- Rob Bailey (director), English television director
- Rob Bailey (musician) (born 1953), Australian bass guitarist
- Robert Bailey (American football) (born 1968), American football cornerback
- Robert Bailey (epidemiologist), American epidemiologist
- Robert Bailey (geographer) (born 1939), American geographer
- Robert Bailey Jr. (born 1990), American actor
- Robert B. Bailey (1892–1957), lieutenant governor of Arkansas
- Robert D. Bailey Sr. (1883–1963), American judge involved in the Matewan Massacre trials
- Robert D. Bailey Jr. (1912–1994), West Virginia Secretary of State
- Robert E. Bailey, U.S. Air Force general
- Robert E. Bailey (animal trainer), behaviorist and husband of Marian Breland Bailey
- Robert L. Bailey (1922–2018), politician in Oklahoma

== See also ==
- Robert Baillie (disambiguation)
- Robert Bayley (died 1859), English independent minister
- Bob Bailey (disambiguation)
