= White Dog Fell from the Sky =

2013 novel by Eleanor Morse

- First edition US hardcover
- Author: Eleanor Morse
- Language: English
- Genre: Fiction
- Publisher: Viking Adult
- Publication date: January 3, 2013
- Media type: Print and e-book
- Pages: 368 pages
- ISBN: 0670026409

White Dog Fell from the Sky is a 2013 novel by Eleanor Morse. The book was published on January 3, 2013 through Viking Adult and is set in 1970s Botswana and apartheid South Africa.

== Synopsis ==
Isaac Muthethe, a black medical student in South Africa in 1976, is forced to flee to Botswana after a friend is murdered by members of the South African Defense Force. Leaving behind his family and future, he is smuggled across the border and finds himself accompanied by a stray white dog that refuses to leave him. In Gaborone, Isaac reconnects with an old acquaintance, Amen, who is involved in the ANC resistance. Isaac wants no part of it, but needs a place to stay. While staying with Amen’s family, Isaac takes work as a gardener for Alice Mendelssohn, an American whose marriage is failing.

When Alice departs on a work trip into the bush, she leaves Isaac in charge of her home. On her return, she discovers White Dog gravely injured and Isaac missing. Her search for answers leads her toward the realities of apartheid South Africa. Meanwhile, during her travels Alice meets Ian Henry, an English anthropologist who prefers life in the bush to the city, and is a man deeply connected to the culture and plight of the !Kung San people.

As both Isaac and Alice deal with different kinds of loss and pain, their stories highlight the horrors of the apartheid regime, the major problems facing post-colonial Africa, and also the more hopeful strength of human connections.

== Development ==
Initial development for the character of Alice began over twelve years before publication, when Morse created her as a character for a different book that was never completed. She developed the character of Isaac later, while teaching a fiction writing class. Morse also stated that she drew upon her own experiences of Botswana in the story.

== Reception ==
Critical reception for White Dog Fell from the Sky has been mostly positive, with Oprah.com listing it as one of their 16 Must-Read Books for January 2013. Kirkus Reviews praises for the novel for its vivid depictions of Botswana and for Morse's writing, but critiqued the "idealization of Isaac and all the black Africans as noble victims" because it "does them a disservice by making them two-dimensional in contrast to the three-dimensional whites".

Publishers Weekly called the book "both brutal and beautiful", stating that Morse's "unflinching portrayals of extremes of loyalty and cruelty make for an especially memorable novel", and noting that Botswana, South Africa, and the White Dog are "characters as important and well-drawn as Alice and Isaac". The Library Journal review asserts: "Morse writes heartbreakingly of isolation, loss, and the soul-deadening effect of torture. Her mesmerizing descriptions of Africa will leave readers wondering how a continent of such beauty can harbor so much evil. Like Vaddey Ratner's In the Shadow of the Banyan or Chris Bohjalian's The Sandcastle Girls, this is for readers unafraid to plumb the depths of human emotion."

Reviewer Sara Vilkomerson, in her Entertainment Weekly review, gave the book the grade of B+ and wrote, "Morse's writing is lyrical and quite beautiful, with searing descriptions of the dusty earth, unforgiving sun, and stark skies. The inner workings of her main characters' minds may remain a mystery, but that doesn't stop you from getting attached to their respective heartaches and plights and rooting for their happiness."
