= Irven DeVore =

American anthropologist and evolutionary biologist

Irven DeVore (October 7, 1934 – September 23, 2014) was an anthropologist and evolutionary biologist, and Curator of Primatology at Harvard University's Peabody Museum of Archaeology and Ethnology. He headed Harvard's Department of Anthropology from 1987 to 1992. He taught generations of students at Harvard both at the undergraduate and graduate levels. He mentored many young scientists who went on to prominence in anthropology and behavioral biology, including Richard Lee, Robert Trivers, Sarah Hrdy, Peter Ellison, Barbara Smuts, Henry Harpending, Marjorie Shostak, Robert Bailey, Leda Cosmides, John Tooby, Richard Wrangham and Terrence Deacon.

== Early life and career ==
DeVore grew up in Joy, Texas, and attended the University of Texas for his undergraduate studies. He later pursued his Ph.D. at the University of Chicago upon receiving the Danford Scholarship, which paid the full costs for his and his wife's, Nancy DeVore, graduate education. DeVore went on to do field research on the behavior and ecology of baboons in 1959, at the same time Jane Goodall was doing her research on chimpanzees and Robert Ardrey was writing African Genesis (1961), a book that DeVore used to use as an example of how not to explain human evolution scientifically. DeVore's own mentor was Sherwood Washburn, a distinguished physical anthropologist and primatologist whom DeVore followed from the University of Chicago, where he received his Ph.D. in 1962, to the University of California at Berkeley, where he held a prestigious Miller Fellowship. Under Washburn's wing, he carried out pioneering studies of baboon behavior and ecology, and in 1965 published a collection of research chapters on various primates, a volume under DeVore's editorship that helped define the field of behavioral primatology. His many field trips to the baboons were a natural focus for a young man who, growing up in and around Joy, Texas, had steeped himself in nature. Throughout life he was known for delightedly adopting odd pets, and his trips to Africa put him back in touch with the natural world he had loved since childhood.

== Ethnographic work ==
However, by the mid-'60s he had turned his attention to humans, through his collaboration with Richard B. Lee. Together they organized (despite their youth) an influential international conference called Man the Hunter, which included Claude Lévi-Strauss in cultural anthropology, Lewis Binford in archeology, and other experts in disciplines relevant to hunter-gatherer studies, a sub-field Lee and DeVore helped create. The conference led to a landmark book in 1968; although the title seemed anachronistic within a few years, the book posited that women were the main breadwinners in that type of society.

Meanwhile, Lee and DeVore had also made their first, exploratory visit to northwestern Botswana, where they contacted San (or "Bushman") people who were still hunting and gathering for a living. Together they mounted a years-long, multidisciplinary project to study the way of life of the group known as the !Kung or Ju/'hoansi, involving a number of graduate students and visiting scientists. The study became a model for multidisciplinary anthropological field work, which DeVore often contrasted with the classic approach of "one ethnographer with his people against the sky." He did not shrink from making barbed statements and he cast a narrow critical shadow, but for those whose work he liked, his support was legendary. DeVore's kind of field research was more expensive, but he was vigorous and successful in raising grant funds for research that he believed in, by himself and others.

In the late 1970s he began another major multidisciplinary study, together with Robert Bailey and Nadine Peacock, among the small-stature hunter-gatherers of the Ituri rain forest. This too produced a stream of monographs and scientific papers that contributed to our understand of this way of life, which DeVore believed shed light on the human past. This claim became widely accepted. DeVore was sometimes accused of treating the San and Ituri people as relics of that past, but he always explained that they were people like us who happened to still be subsisting in this very old way.

== Evolutionary theory ==
DeVore, not one to shy away from controversy, was also an early enthusiast of the fields of sociobiology and evolutionary psychology, fostering their development through mentoring and teaching as well as through interviews, lectures, debates, and writing for scientific and popular audiences. He became an advocate for the evolutionary biological approach after being one of the few to listen to the ideas of Robert Trivers, who was shunned due to his mental illness. Several years into this new way of looking at animal and human behavior, DeVore was asked whether the data were really supporting it. He liked to say, "The data are sitting up and begging." By the turn of the millennium sociobiology and evolutionary psychology had become normal science, although still controversial. One of the painful consequences for DeVore in the '80s and '90s was that his mentor and close friend, "Sherry" Washburn, was a bitter opponent of the new approach. They eventually reconciled, but never agreed.

DeVore had a sometimes caustic but compelling personality and intellect that worked their influence in and out of the classroom. He appeared on many television programs as an expert or narrator. He played an instrumental role in developing supplementary school curricula, one of which, "Man: A Course of Study" (MACOS) became a subject of Congressional debate because of its emphasis on evolution. The son of an itinerant Methodist preacher in East Texas, DeVore had sold Bibles door-to-door for a time as a very young man, but when he became convinced of the validity of Darwin's theory, he taught and defended it with what many said was a compelling art of persuasion.

He suggested that, due to sexual selection, "Males are basically a breeding experiment run by females" and that "Males are the safest, most consistent way to contribute variation to the system..."

Irven DeVore once said that "There is no excuse for boring students when you're talking about human nature. It's too interesting." He taught in large lecture halls that were perennially full as well as in the smaller but influential "Simian Seminar," which met in his living room on Wednesday evenings, in his rambling, comfortable home on a quiet wooded street in Cambridge. Leading or rising figures in the fields he was interested in came to address the seminar, which was a center of intellectual ferment in those fields for decades.

Through these seminars, the ideas of evolutionary biology rose to prominence as group selection (with regard to explaining behaviour) faded, albeit not directly through Irven's work. Leda Cosmides and John Tooby, two attendees of the seminars, stated "DeVore's intellectual impact is less well known because his ideas were realized through his students and colleagues."

== Personal life and awards ==
He was an avid and widely published photographer, and his photos became part of the core collection of AnthroPhoto, an agency founded by his wife, Nancy DeVore, and now managed by his daughter, Claire. The agency is known for the scientific authenticity of the photos and accompanying information. DeVore also made or helped to make numerous documentary and educational films about baboons and other subjects.

DeVore was a Fellow of the American Academy of Arts and Sciences, the American Association for the Advancement of Science, and the American Anthropological Association. He won the Walker Prize for Science of the Museum of Science, Boston, and the Lifetime Achievement Award of the Institute of Human Origins. He helped lay the foundations of Harvard's Department of Human Evolutionary Biology, which became independent of the Department of Anthropology in 2009, some years after DeVore's retirement.

On September 3, 2014, DeVore died of heart failure. He lived through the death of his son, Gregory, in 2003. His wife, Nancy, died several months after her husband. DeVore is survived by his daughter, Claire, and his four grandchildren who remain in Massachusetts.

== Books ==
- Primate Behavior: Field Studies of Monkeys and Apes, ed., Holt, Rinehart & Winston, New York.
- 1963 Baboon Behavior Awarded first prize by the Educational Film Library Association, 1963.
- 1965 The Primates, with S. Eimerl (Series: LIFE Nature Library), Time-Life, New York.
- 1968 Man the Hunter, with Richard B. Lee, eds. Aldine Publ., Chicago.
- 1976 Kalahari Hunter-Gatherers, with Richard B. Lee, eds., Harvard University Press, Cambridge, Massachusetts.
- 1982 Field Guide for the Study of Adolescence, with Beatrice Whiting, John Whiting, et al.
- 1990 Current Studies on Primate Socioecology and Evolution.
- 1992 Socioecology of baboons in the Cape of Good Hope Nature Reserve, 1958–92.
