= Man the Hunter =

1966 symposium and book on hunter-gatherers

Man the Hunter was a 1966 symposium organized by Richard Lee and Irven DeVore. The symposium resulted in a book of the same title and attempted to bring together for the first time a comprehensive look at recent ethnographic research on hunter-gatherers.

Eriksen and Nielson argue that the symposium was one of the high points of cultural ecology. They report the symposium as concentrating on contemporary hunters and gatherers and noted that the contributors were mostly American cultural anthropologists. The main point of the conference was that given that hunting was humanity's original source of livelihood, any theory of society and the nature of Man would require a deep knowledge of how hunters live. The symposium also emphasised the rivalry between cultural and materialist understanding of culture and society.

The symposium was held at the Center for Continuing Education, University of Chicago, from April 6 to the 9th, 1966 and was attended by several of the most influential figures in then contemporary anthropology. In addition to Lee and DeVore, the symposium was attended by Marshall Sahlins, Aram Yengoyan, George Peter Murdock, Colin Turnbull, Lewis Binford, and Julian Steward.

The corresponding book, containing the papers presented at the symposium, was published by Aldine Transaction in 1968.

== Critiques ==
In the decades after its publication, Man the Hunter was critiqued by both sociocultural anthropologists and archaeologists. While conference attendees had stressed their studies of hunters and gatherers as a link to a Pleistocene past, historical particularists like Edwin Wilmsen and James Denbow critiqued this approach in what became known as the Kalahari Debate. Another response from feminists like Jane F. Collier and Michelle Rosaldo critiqued the gendered assumptions in Man the Hunter, highlighting how masculine-coded activities like hunting were considered central to human development, whereas so-called women's work was devalued and considered evolutionarily unimportant. Finally, a strain of critiques focused on the ways that hunter-gatherer societies have been considered 'passive' landscape managers. Using archaeological evidence to show how landscape management strategies like fire shaped the landscape at a large scale, archaeologists like Kent Lightfoot, Rob Cuthrell, Chuck Striplen, and Mark Hylkema have shown how indigenous hunter-gatherers changed landscape ecology.

There has been ongoing debates since about the framing of gendered divisions of labor in the deep past with human behavioral ecologists primarily emphasizing the ethnographic record as supporting a universal division of male hunters and female gatherers, and archaeologists, paleoanthropologists, and physiologists focusing more the lack of evidence in the fossil record and oft ignored physiological/anatomical advantages of women. There is also debate about bias in the ethnographic record.

== Literature ==
- Lee, R. B., DeVore, I. (eds) (1968): Man the Hunter. The First Intensive Survey of a Single, Crucial Stage of Human Development—Man's Once Universal Hunting Way of Life, Chicago, Aldine.
- Eriksen, T. H., Nielsen, F.S. (2001): A History of Anthropology, Pluto Press.
- Wilmsen, Edwin N. 1989. Land Filled with Flies: A Political Economy of the Kalahari. Chicago: University of Chicago Press.
- Dahlberg, Frances, ed. 1981. Woman the Gatherer. New Haven, Conn.: Yale University Press.
- Collier, Jane F., and Michelle Z. Rosaldo. 1981. "Politics and Gender in Simple Societies." In Sexual Meanings: The Cultural Construction of Gender, edited by Sherry B. Ortner and Harriet Whitehead, 275–329. New York: Cambridge University Press.
