= Bobby Bailey =

Bobby Bailey may refer to:

- Bobby Ray Bailey, fictional character in Sweet Home Alabama
- Bobby Bailey, fictional character in Where East Is East

== See also ==
- Bob Bailey (disambiguation)
