= Hunter-gatherer =

Peoples who forage or hunt for most or all of their food

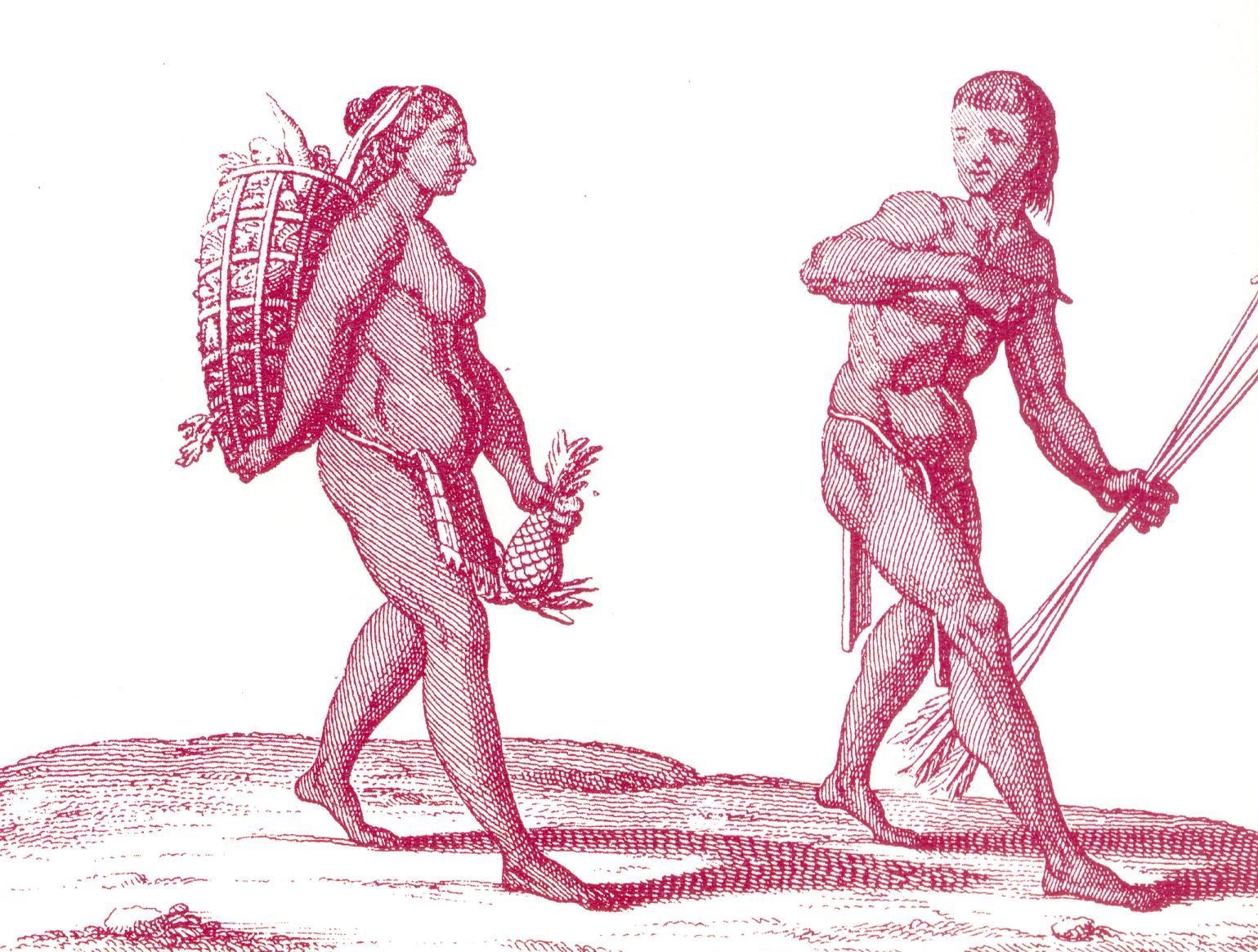
A painting by Pierre Barrère of a Kalina hunter-gatherer couple in French Guiana

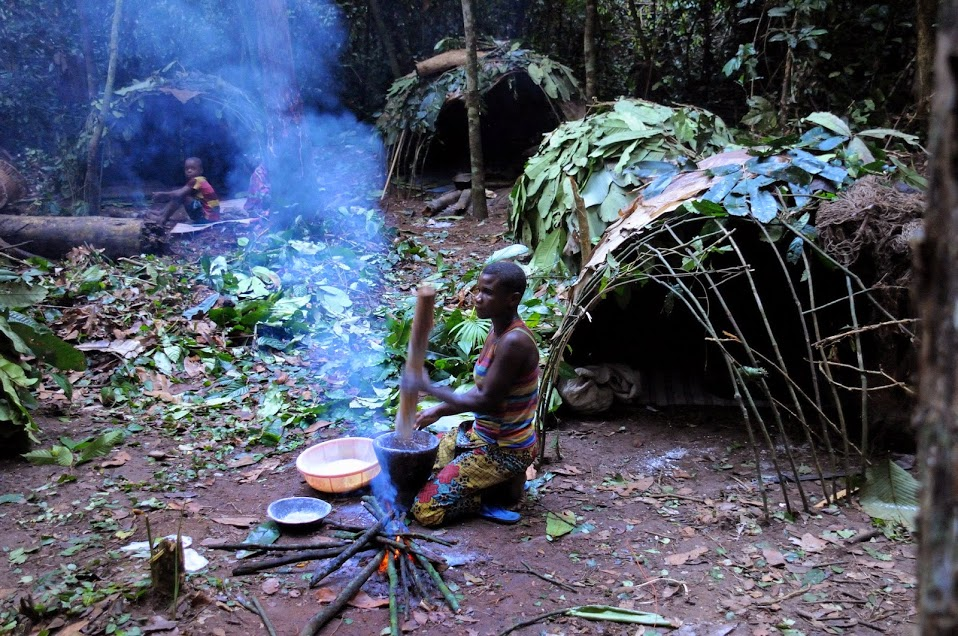
Central African foragers in the Congo Basin in August 2014

A hunter-gatherer or forager is a human living in a community (or according to an ancestrally derived lifestyle) in which most or all food is obtained by procuring naturally occurring edible items from the local wildlife and vegetation via hunting, fishing and/or gathering fruits, seeds and other plant parts (collectively known as vegetables) as well as edible fungi such as mushrooms. This is the human equivalent of the predation and foraging behaviors seen in all omnivorous animals, and was a common practice among most prehistoric human societies, particularly before the rise of agriculture during the Neolithic period. Hunter-gatherer societies, usually a tribe of only a few dozen people, were and are typically fully or semi-nomadic, in contrast with the sedentary and more populous agricultural societies whose food security rely mainly on cultivating crops/produces and raising domesticated animals.

Hunting and gathering emerged with Homo erectus about 1.8 million years ago and was humanity's original and most enduringly successful competitive adaptation in the natural world, occupying at least 90 percent of human history. Following the Neolithic Revolution, hunter-gatherer communities were outcompeted by the more productive agrarian/pastoralist communities and those that did not undergo lifestyle changes were displaced or conquered in most parts of the world, as the latter often have surplus food storages to support larger populations and a division of labor that promotes technological advancement in metallurgy, medicine, transportation and armaments. In Western Eurasia, the replacement of hunter-gatherers by farming societies happened more gradually, as dense forests remained their last refuge until Bronze and Iron Age societies fully overcame them eventually. Today, only a few contemporary societies of uncontacted peoples are still classified as hunter-gatherers, and many of them supplement their foraging activity with horticulture or pastoralism.

Socially, hunter-gatherers were generally egalitarian, emphasizing sharing and resisting hierarchy; though gender roles and some divisions of labor existed, hunter-gatherers are overall generalists and men and women often contributed to both hunting as well as gathering. Archaeological and ethnographic evidence shows wide variation depending on environment, from the mammoth steppe hunters in Siberia to the semi-sedentary Eskaleut fishermen/seal hunters of the Arctic. Their diets varied by climate, local florae and faunae, and access to aquatic resources, with fat as a critical nutrient, but generally is more balanced with higher roughage content and a more diverse range of food groups (e.g. the "bush tucker" diet of Aboriginal Australians), coupled with a more physically active lifestyle. Over time, many bands specialized in particular resources and tools, and some transitioned into agriculture, which led to permanent settlements, governments, and social stratification. While most hunter-gatherers eventually adopted farming or were displaced, some groups—such as the San, Pumé, and Sentinelese—continue aspects of this lifestyle today.

== Archaeological evidence ==
Hunting and gathering was presumably the subsistence strategy employed by human societies beginning some 1.8 million years ago, by Homo erectus, and from its appearance some 300.000 years ago by Homo sapiens. Prehistoric hunter-gatherers lived in groups that consisted of several families resulting in a size of a few dozens of people.

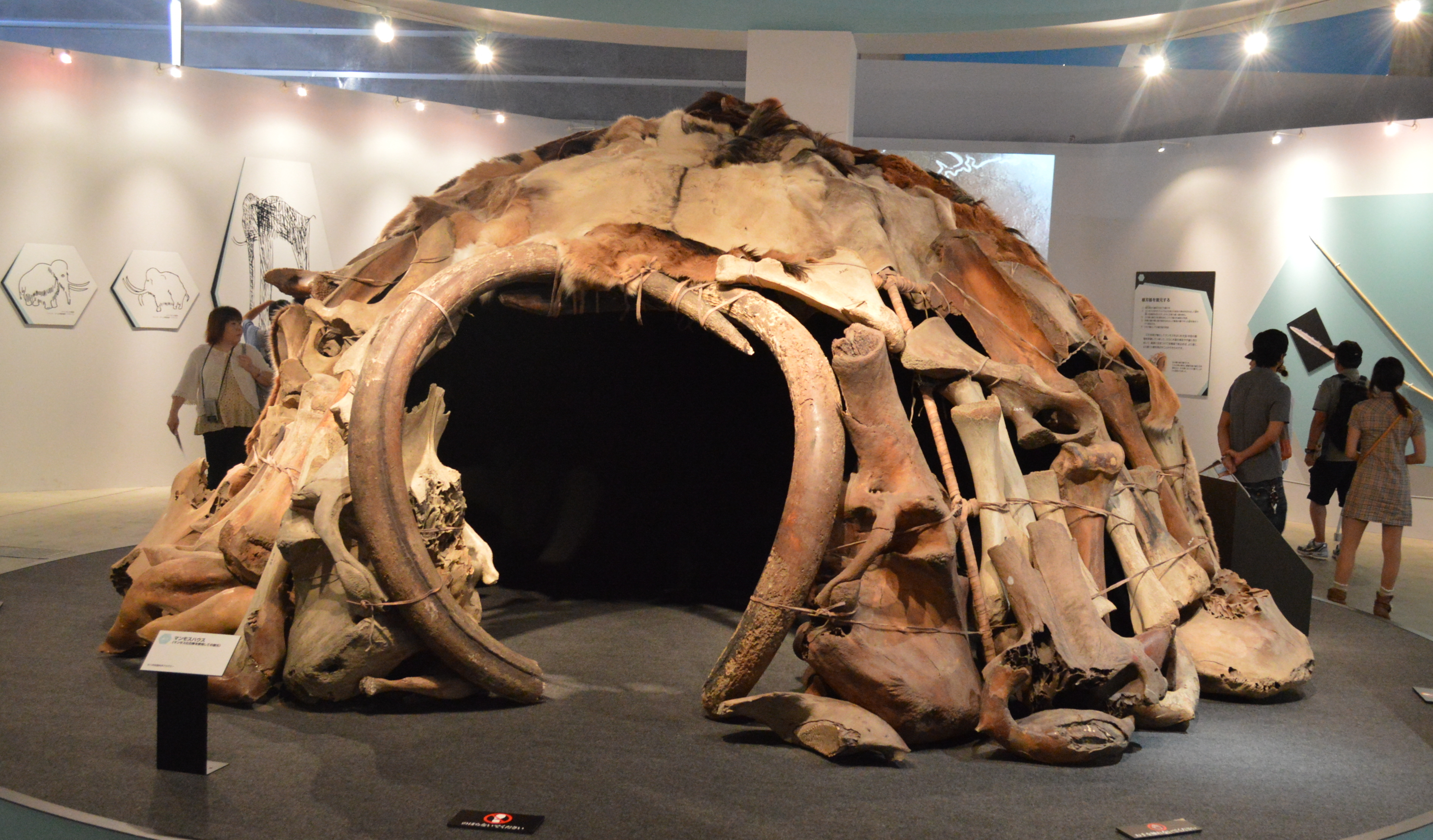
The Mal'ta-Buret' people in the Baikal region of Siberia lived in dwellings built of mammoth bones, similar to those found in Upper Paleolithic Western Eurasia.

The Late Pleistocene witnessed the spread of modern humans outside of Africa as well as the extinction of all other human species. Humans spread to the Australian continent and the Americas for the first time, coincident with the extinction of numerous predominantly megafaunal species. Major extinctions were incurred in Australia beginning approximately 50,000 years ago and in the Americas about 15,000 years ago. Ancient North Eurasians lived in extreme conditions of the mammoth steppes of Siberia and survived by hunting mammoths, bison and woolly rhinoceroses. The settlement of the Americas began when Paleolithic hunter-gatherers entered North America from the North Asian mammoth steppe via the Beringia land bridge.

During the 1970s, Lewis Binford suggested that early humans obtained food via scavenging, not hunting. Early humans in the Lower Paleolithic lived in forests and woodlands, which allowed them to collect seafood, eggs, nuts, and fruits besides scavenging. Rather than killing large animals for meat, according to this view, they used carcasses of such animals that had either been killed by predators or that had died of natural causes. Scientists have demonstrated that the evidence for early human behaviors for hunting versus carcass scavenging varies based on the ecology, including the types of predators that existed and the environment.

Hunter-gatherers (yellow) 4,000 years ago (rough estimate)

Starting at the transition between the Middle to Upper Paleolithic period, some 80,000 to 70,000 years ago, some hunter-gatherer bands began to specialize, concentrating on hunting a smaller selection of (often larger) game and gathering a smaller selection of food. This specialization of work also involved creating specialized tools such as fishing nets, hooks, and bone harpoons.

A global map illustrating the decline of foraging/fishing/hunting/gathering around the world.

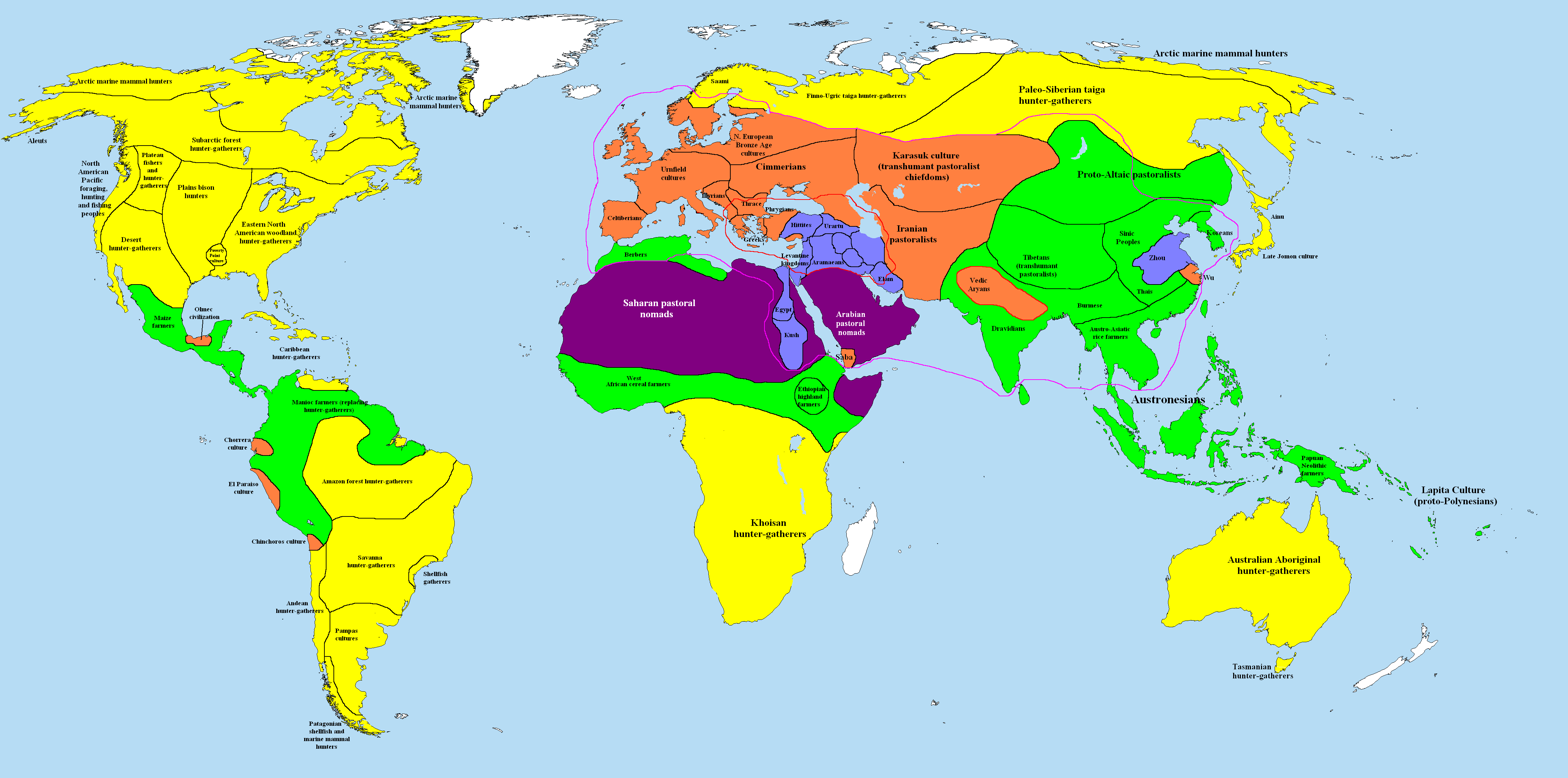
Hunter-gatherers (yellow) 3,000 years ago (rough estimate)

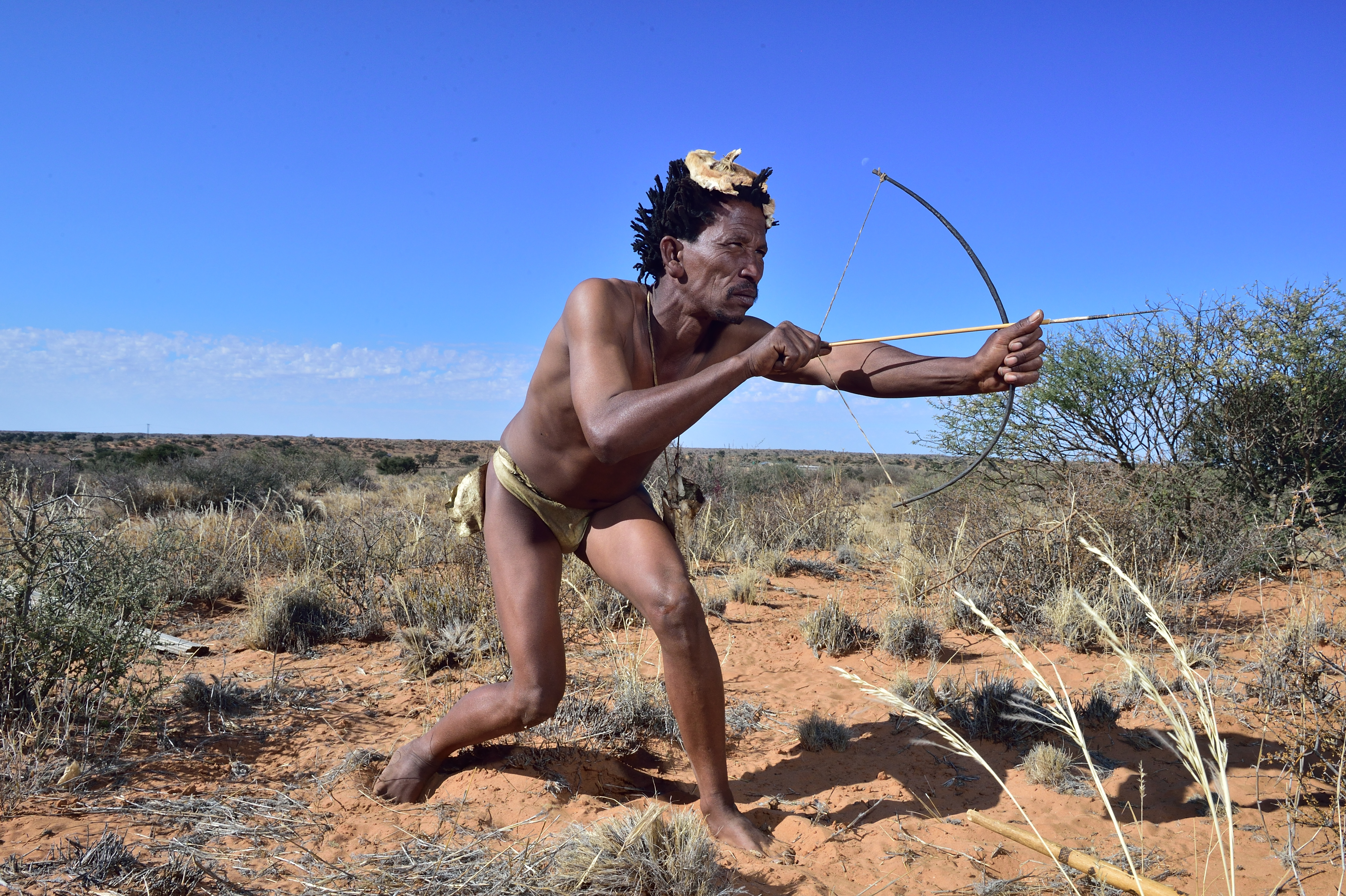
A San man in the Kalahari Desert in South Africa. Many San still live as hunter-gatherers.

Archaeologists can use evidence such as stone tool use to track hunter-gatherer activities, including mobility.

== Common characteristics ==
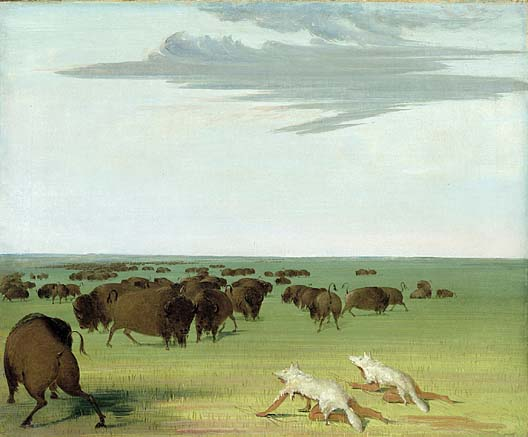
Bison hunt under the wolf-skin mask, George Catlin, c. 1832

=== Habitat and population ===
Some hunter-gatherer cultures, such as the indigenous peoples of the Pacific Northwest Coast and the Yokuts, lived in particularly rich environments that allowed them to be sedentary or semi-sedentary. Amongst the earliest example of permanent settlements is the Osipovka culture (14–10.3 thousand years ago), which lived in a fish-rich environment that allowed them to be able to stay at the same place all year. One group, the Chumash, had the highest recorded population density of any known hunter and gatherer society with an estimated 21.6 persons per square mile.

Hunter-gatherers tends to have much greater home ranges than pre-industrial sedentary farmers. It has been estimated that pre-industrial English people living in small townships would have had a home range of 900 hectares (9 km^{2}), close to that predicted for an omnivorous mammal of their same body mass. Meanwhile, the !Kung San hunter-gatherers have a home range of 10,000 hectares (100 km^{2}), close to that predicted for a carnivorous mammal of their same body mass.

=== Social and economic structure ===
Hunter-gatherers tend to have an egalitarian social ethos, although settled hunter-gatherers (for example, those inhabiting the Northwest Coast of North America and the Calusa in Florida) are an exception to this rule. Mutual exchange and sharing of resources are important in the economic systems of hunter-gatherer societies. Sometimes these societies are characterized as based on a "gift economy". For example, the San people or "Bushmen" of southern Africa have social customs that strongly discourage hoarding and displays of authority, and encourage economic equality via sharing of food and material goods. Karl Marx defined this socio-economic system as primitive communism.

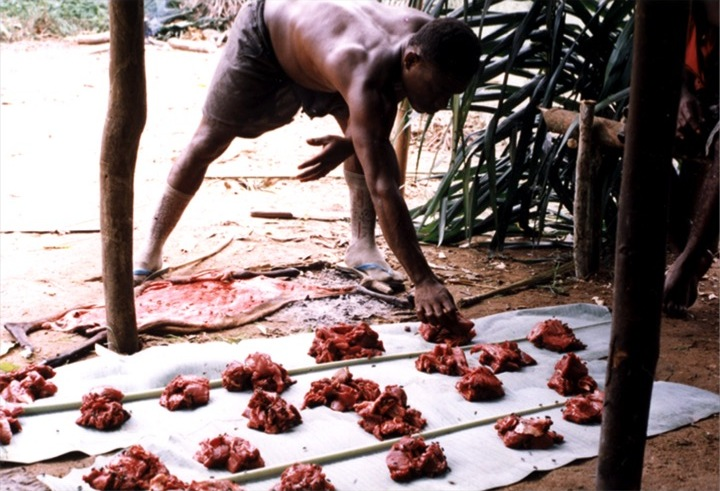
Mbendjele meat sharing

The egalitarianism typical of human hunters and gatherers is never total but is striking when viewed in an evolutionary context. One of humanity's two closest primate relatives, chimpanzees, are anything but egalitarian, forming themselves into hierarchies that are often dominated by an alpha male. So great is the contrast with human hunter-gatherers that it is widely argued by paleoanthropologists that resistance to being dominated was a key factor driving the evolutionary emergence of human consciousness, language, kinship and social organization.

Most anthropologists believe that hunter-gatherers do not have permanent leaders; instead, the person taking the initiative at any one time depends on the task being performed.

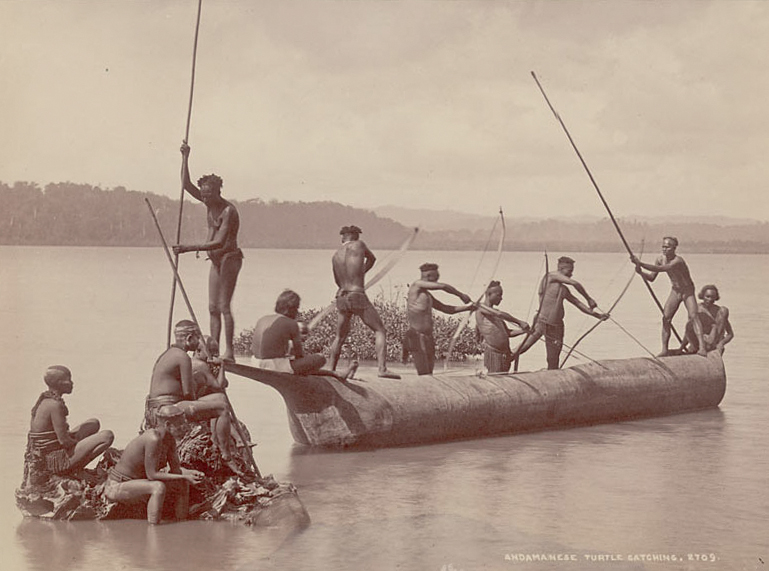
Group of Andamanese hunting c. 1903

Within a particular tribe or people, hunter-gatherers are connected by both kinship and band (residence/domestic group) membership. Postmarital residence among hunter-gatherers tends to be matrilocal, at least initially. Young mothers can enjoy childcare support from their own mothers, who continue living nearby in the same camp. The systems of kinship and descent among human hunter-gatherers were relatively flexible, although there is evidence that early human kinship in general tended to be matrilineal.

The conventional assumption has been that women did most of the gathering, while men concentrated on big game hunting. In recent years, however, this assumption has been challenged by new research findings. Women in many hunter-gatherer societies hunted small game and, in some cases, even participated in big-game hunting. An illustrative account is Megan Biesele's study of the southern African Ju/'hoan, 'Women Like Meat'. A 2006 study suggests that the sexual division of labor could have been one of the organizational innovation that gave Homo sapiens the edge over the Neanderthals, allowing our ancestors to migrate from Africa and spread across the globe.

A 1986 study found most hunter-gatherers have a symbolically structured sexual division of labor. However, it is true that in a small minority of cases, women hunted the same kind of quarry as men, sometimes doing so alongside men. Among the Ju'/hoansi people of Namibia, women help men track down quarry. In the Australian Martu, both women and men participate in hunting but with a different style of gendered division; while men are willing to take more risks to hunt bigger animals such as kangaroo for political gain as a form of "competitive magnanimity", women target smaller game such as lizards to feed their children and promote working relationships with other women, preferring a more constant supply of sustenance. In 2018, 9000-year-old remains of a female hunter along with a toolkit of projectile points and animal processing implements were discovered at the Andean site of Wilamaya Patjxa, Puno District in Peru. A 2020 study inspired by this discovery found that of 27 identified burials with hunter gatherers of a known sex who were also buried with hunting tools, 11 were female hunter gatherers, while 16 were male hunter gatherers. Combined with uncertainties, these findings suggest that anywhere from 30 to 50 percent of big game hunters were female. A 2023 study that looked at studies of contemporary hunter gatherer societies from the 1800s to the present day found that women hunted in 79 percent of hunter gatherer societies. However, an attempted verification of this study found "that multiple methodological failures all bias their results in the same direction...their analysis does not contradict the wide body of empirical evidence for gendered divisions of labor in foraging societies".

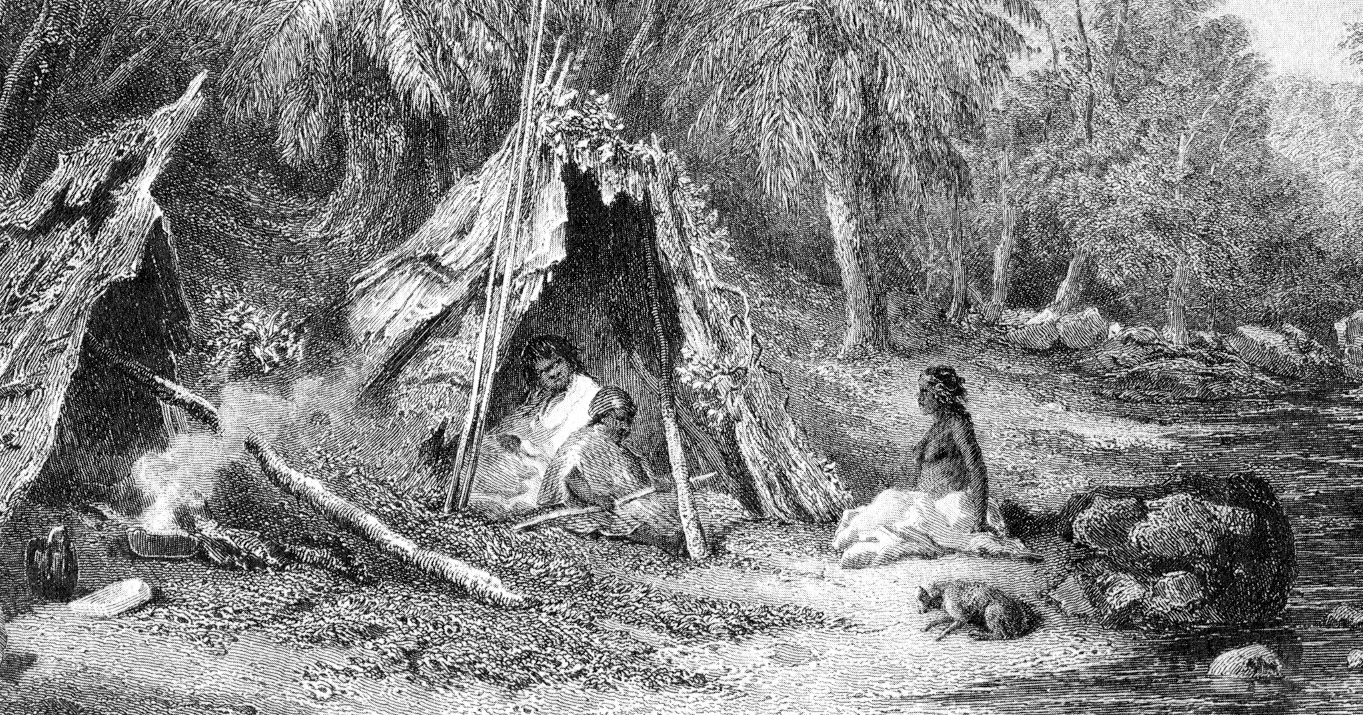
A 19th-century engraving of an Indigenous Australian encampment.

At the 1966 "Man the Hunter" conference, anthropologists Richard Borshay Lee and Irven DeVore suggested that egalitarianism was one of several central characteristics of nomadic hunting and gathering societies because mobility requires minimization of material possessions throughout a population. Therefore, no surplus of resources can be accumulated by any single member. Other characteristics Lee and DeVore proposed were flux in territorial boundaries as well as in demographic composition.

At the same conference, Marshall Sahlins presented a paper entitled, "Notes on the Original Affluent Society", in which he challenged the popular view of hunter-gatherers lives as "solitary, poor, nasty, brutish and short", as Thomas Hobbes had put it in 1651. According to Sahlins, ethnographic data indicated that hunter-gatherers worked far fewer hours and enjoyed more leisure than typical members of industrial society, and they still ate well. Their "affluence" came from the idea that they were satisfied with very little in the material sense. Later, in 1996, Ross Sackett performed two distinct meta-analyses to empirically test Sahlin's view. The first of these studies looked at 102 time-allocation studies, and the second one analyzed 207 energy-expenditure studies. Sackett found that adults in foraging and horticultural societies work on average, about 6.5 hours a day, whereas people in agricultural and industrial societies work on average 8.8 hours a day. Sahlins' theory has been criticized for only including time spent hunting and gathering while omitting time spent on collecting firewood, food preparation, etc. Other scholars also assert that hunter-gatherer societies were not "affluent" but suffered from extremely high infant mortality, frequent disease, and perennial warfare.

Researchers Gurven and Kaplan have estimated that around 57% of hunter-gatherers reach the age of 15. Of those that reach 15 years of age, 64% continue to live to or past the age of 45. This places the life expectancy between 21 and 37 years. They further estimate that 70% of deaths are due to diseases of some kind, 20% of deaths come from violence or accidents and 10% are due to degenerative diseases.

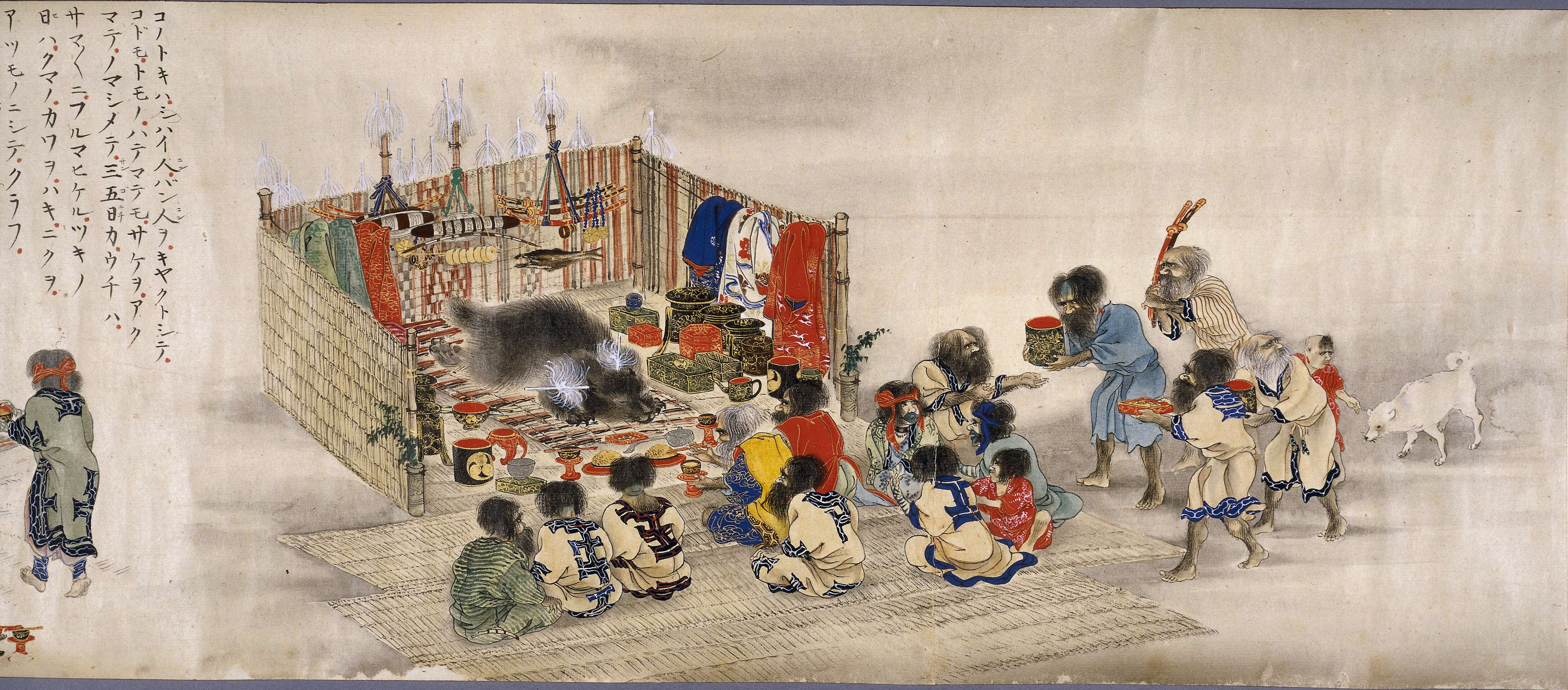
The Ainu Iomante ceremony (bear sending). Japanese scroll painting, c. 1870

A 2010 paper argued that while hunter-gatherers may have lower levels of inequality than modern, industrialised societies, that does not mean inequality does not exist. The researchers estimated that the average Gini coefficient amongst hunter-gatherers was 0.25, equivalent to the country of Denmark in 2007. In addition, wealth transmission across generations was also a feature of hunter-gatherers, meaning that "wealthy" hunter-gatherers, within the context of their communities, were more likely to have children as wealthy as them than poorer members of their community and indeed hunter-gatherer societies demonstrate an understanding of social stratification. The researchers agreed that hunter-gatherers were more egalitarian than modern societies, but challenged prior characterisations of them living in a state of egalitarian primitive communism.

This study, however, exclusively examined modern hunter-gatherer communities, offering limited insight into the exact nature of social structures that existed prior to the Neolithic Revolution. Alain Testart and others have said that anthropologists should be careful when using research on current hunter-gatherer societies to determine the structure of societies in the paleolithic era, emphasising cross-cultural influences, progress and development that such societies have undergone in the past 10,000 years.

== Diet ==
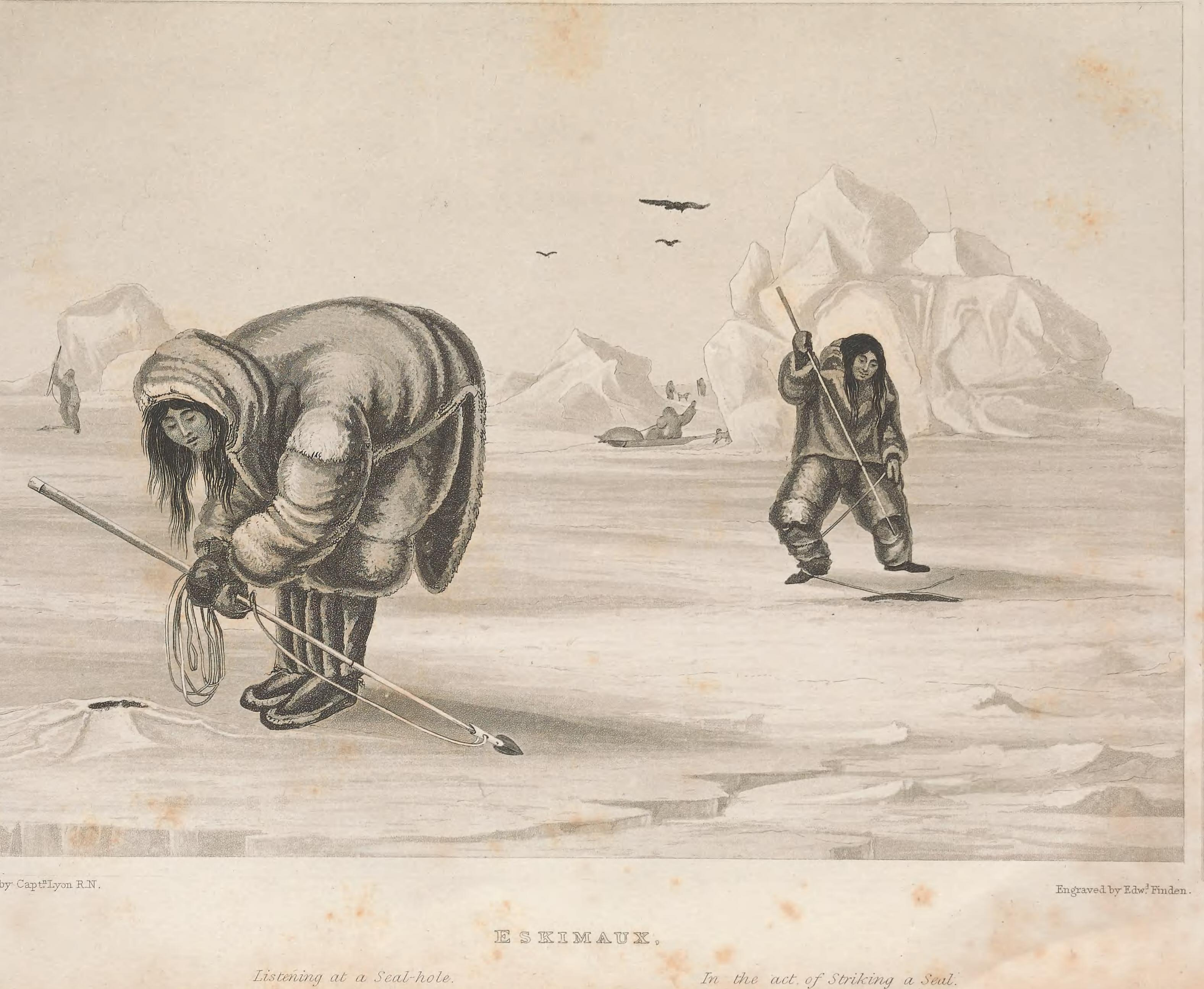
Inuit seal hunters, c. 1821

As one moves away from the equator, the importance of plant food decreases and the importance of aquatic food increases. In cold and heavily forested environments, edible plant foods and large game are less abundant and hunter-gatherers may turn to aquatic resources to compensate. Hunter-gatherers in cold climates also rely more on stored food than those in warm climates. However, aquatic resources tend to be costly, requiring boats and fishing technology, and this may have impeded their intensive use in prehistory. Marine food probably did not start becoming prominent in the diet until relatively recently, during the Late Stone Age in southern Africa and the Upper Paleolithic in Europe.

Fat is important in assessing the quality of game among hunter-gatherers, to the point that lean animals are often considered secondary resources or even starvation food. Consuming too much lean meat leads to adverse health effects like protein poisoning, and can in extreme cases lead to death. Additionally, a diet high in protein and low in other macronutrients results in the body using the protein as energy, possibly leading to protein deficiency. Lean meat especially becomes a problem when animals go through a lean season that requires them to metabolize fat deposits.

In areas where plant and fish resources are scarce, hunter-gatherers may trade meat with horticulturalists for carbohydrates. For example, tropical hunter-gatherers may have an excess of protein but be deficient in carbohydrates, and conversely tropical horticulturalists may have a surplus of carbohydrates but inadequate protein. Trading may thus be the most cost-effective means of acquiring carbohydrate resources.

== Variability ==
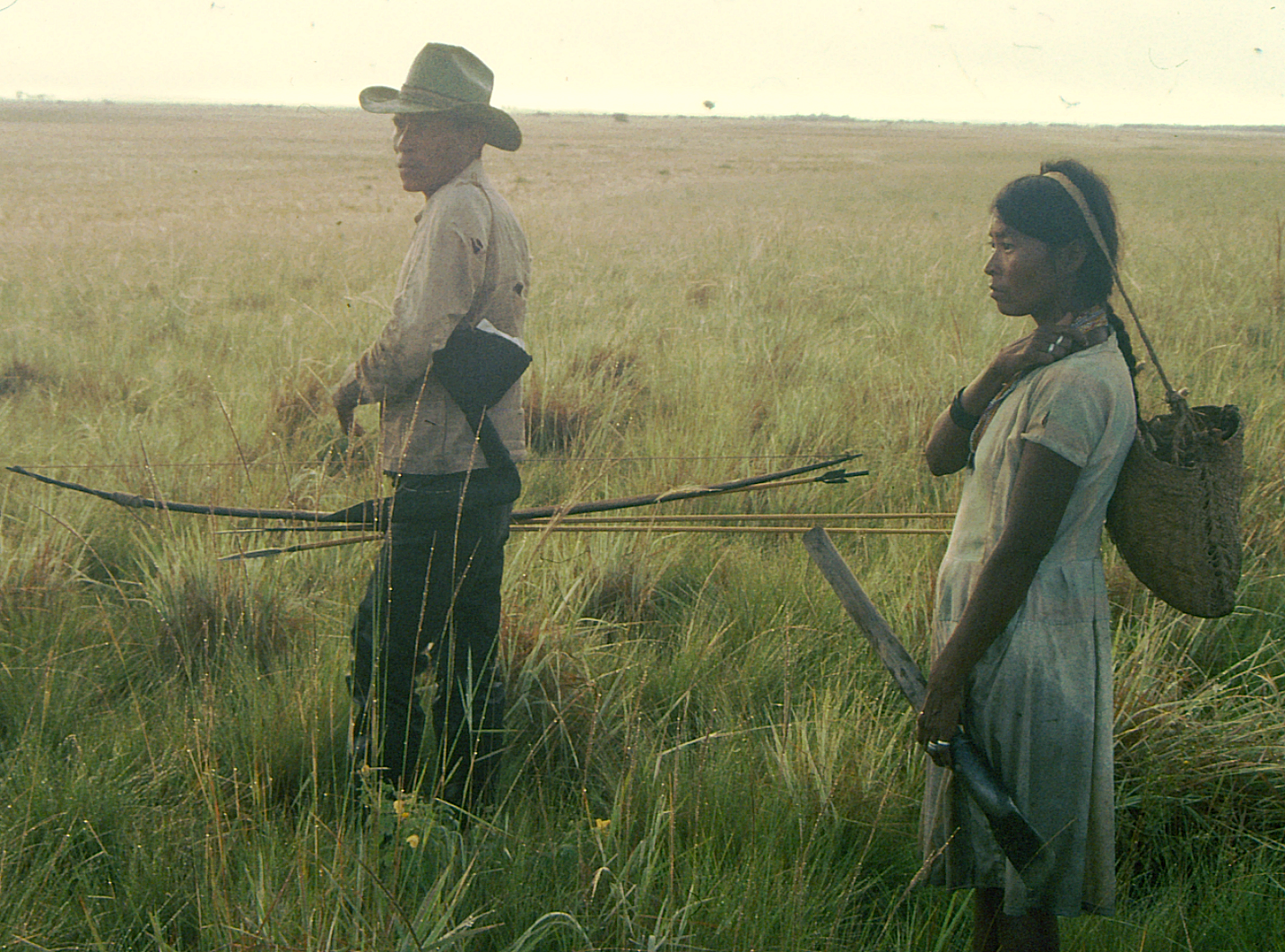
Savanna Pumé couple on a hunting and gathering trip in the llanos of Venezuela. The man carries a bow, three steel-tipped arrows, and a hat that resembles the head of a jabiru stork as camouflage to approach near enough to deer for a shot. The woman carries a steel-tipped digging stick and a carrying basket for collecting wild tubers.

Hunter-gatherer societies manifest significant variability, depending on climate zone/life zone, available technology, and societal structure. Archaeologists examine hunter-gatherer tool kits to measure variability across different groups. Collard et al. (2005) found temperature to be the only statistically significant factor to impact hunter-gatherer tool kits. Using temperature as a proxy for risk, Collard et al.'s results suggest that environments with extreme temperatures pose a threat to hunter-gatherer systems significant enough to warrant increased variability of tools. These results support Torrence's (1989) theory that the risk of failure is indeed the most important factor in determining the structure of hunter-gatherer toolkits.

One way to divide hunter-gatherer groups is by their return systems. James Woodburn uses the categories "immediate return" hunter-gatherers for egalitarianism and "delayed return" for nonegalitarian. Immediate return foragers consume their food within a day or two after they procure it. Delayed return foragers store the surplus food.

Hunting-gathering was the common human mode of subsistence throughout the Paleolithic, but the observation of current-day hunters and gatherers does not necessarily reflect Paleolithic societies; the hunter-gatherer cultures examined today have had much contact with modern civilization and do not represent "pristine" conditions found in uncontacted peoples.

The transition from hunting and gathering to agriculture is not necessarily a one-way process. It has been argued that hunting and gathering represents an adaptive strategy, which may still be exploited, if necessary, when environmental change causes extreme food stress for agriculturalists. In fact, it is sometimes difficult to draw a clear line between agricultural and hunter-gatherer societies, especially since the widespread adoption of agriculture and resulting cultural diffusion that has occurred in the last 10,000 years.

Some scholars speak about the existence within cultural evolution of the so-called mixed-economies or dual economies that imply a combination of food procurement (gathering and hunting) and food production or when foragers have trade relations with farmers.

== Modern and revisionist perspectives ==
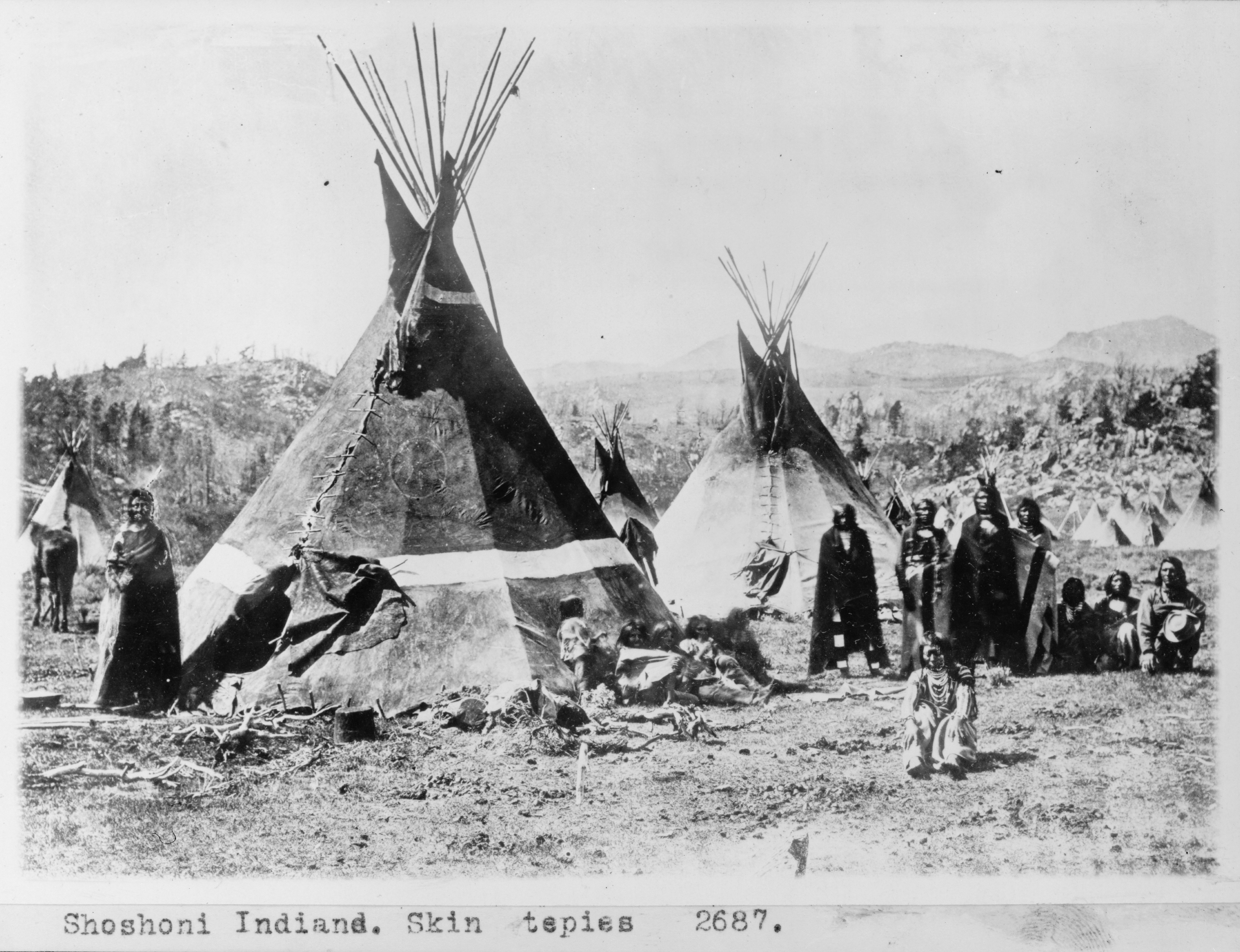
A Shoshone encampment in the Wind River Range of Wyoming, photographed by W.H Jackson, 1870

Some of the theorists who advocate this "revisionist" critique imply that, because the "pure hunter-gatherer" disappeared not long after colonial (or even agricultural) contact began, nothing meaningful can be learned about prehistoric hunter-gatherers from studies of modern ones (Kelly, 24–29; see Wilmsen)

Lee and Guenther have rejected most of the arguments put forward by Wilmsen. Doron Shultziner and others have argued that we can learn a lot about the life-styles of prehistoric hunter-gatherers from studies of contemporary hunter-gatherers—especially their impressive levels of egalitarianism.

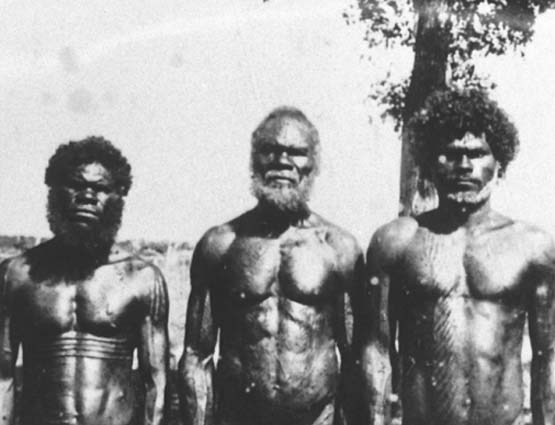
Three Aboriginal Australians on Bathurst Island in 1939. According to Peterson (1998), the island population was isolated for 6,000 years until the 18th century. In 1929, three-quarters of the population supported themselves on bush tucker.

There are nevertheless a number of contemporary hunter-gatherer peoples who, after contact with other societies, continue their ways of life with very little external influence or with modifications that perpetuate the viability of hunting and gathering in the 21st century. One such group is the Pila Nguru (Spinifex people) of Western Australia, whose land in the Great Victoria Desert has proved unsuitable for European agriculture (and even pastoralism). Another are the Sentinelese of the Andaman Islands in the Indian Ocean, who live on North Sentinel Island and to date have maintained their independent existence, repelling attempts to engage with and contact them. The Savanna Pumé of Venezuela also live in an area that is inhospitable to large scale economic exploitation and maintain their subsistence based on hunting and gathering, as well as incorporating a small amount of manioc horticulture that supplements, but is not replacing, reliance on foraged foods.

== Americas ==
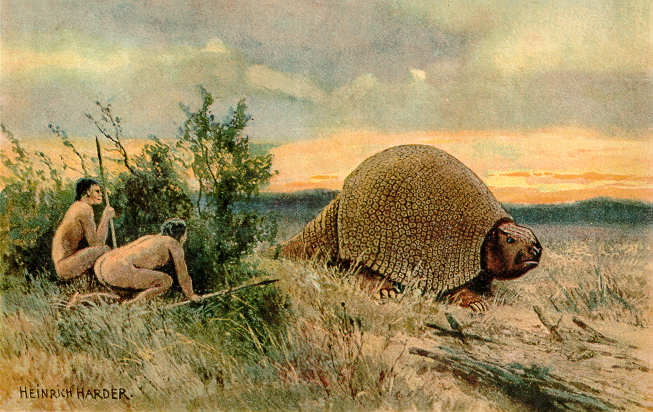
Illustration of Paleo-Indians hunting a glyptodon

Evidence suggests big-game hunter-gatherers crossed the Bering Strait from Asia (Eurasia) into North America over a land bridge (Beringia), that existed between 47,000 and 14,000 years ago. Around 18,500–15,500 years ago, these hunter-gatherers are believed to have followed herds of now-extinct Pleistocene megafauna along ice-free corridors that stretched between the Laurentide and Cordilleran ice sheets. Another route proposed is that, either on foot or using primitive boats, they migrated down the Pacific coast to South America.

Hunter-gatherers would eventually flourish all over the Americas, primarily based in the Great Plains of the United States and Canada, with offshoots as far east as the Gaspé Peninsula on the Atlantic coast, and as far south as Chile, Monte Verde. American hunter-gatherers were spread over a wide geographical area, thus there were regional variations in lifestyles. However, all the individual groups shared a common style of stone tool production, making knapping styles and progress identifiable. This early Paleo-Indian period lithic reduction tool adaptations have been found across the Americas, utilized by highly mobile bands consisting of approximately 25 to 50 members of an extended family.

The Archaic period in the Americas saw a changing environment featuring a warmer more arid climate and the disappearance of the last megafauna. The majority of population groups at this time were still highly mobile hunter-gatherers. Individual groups started to focus on resources available to them locally, however, and thus archaeologists have identified a pattern of increasing regional generalization, as seen with the Southwest, Arctic, Poverty Point, Dalton and Plano traditions. These regional adaptations would become the norm, with reliance less on hunting and gathering, with a more mixed economy of small game, fish, seasonally wild vegetables and harvested plant foods.

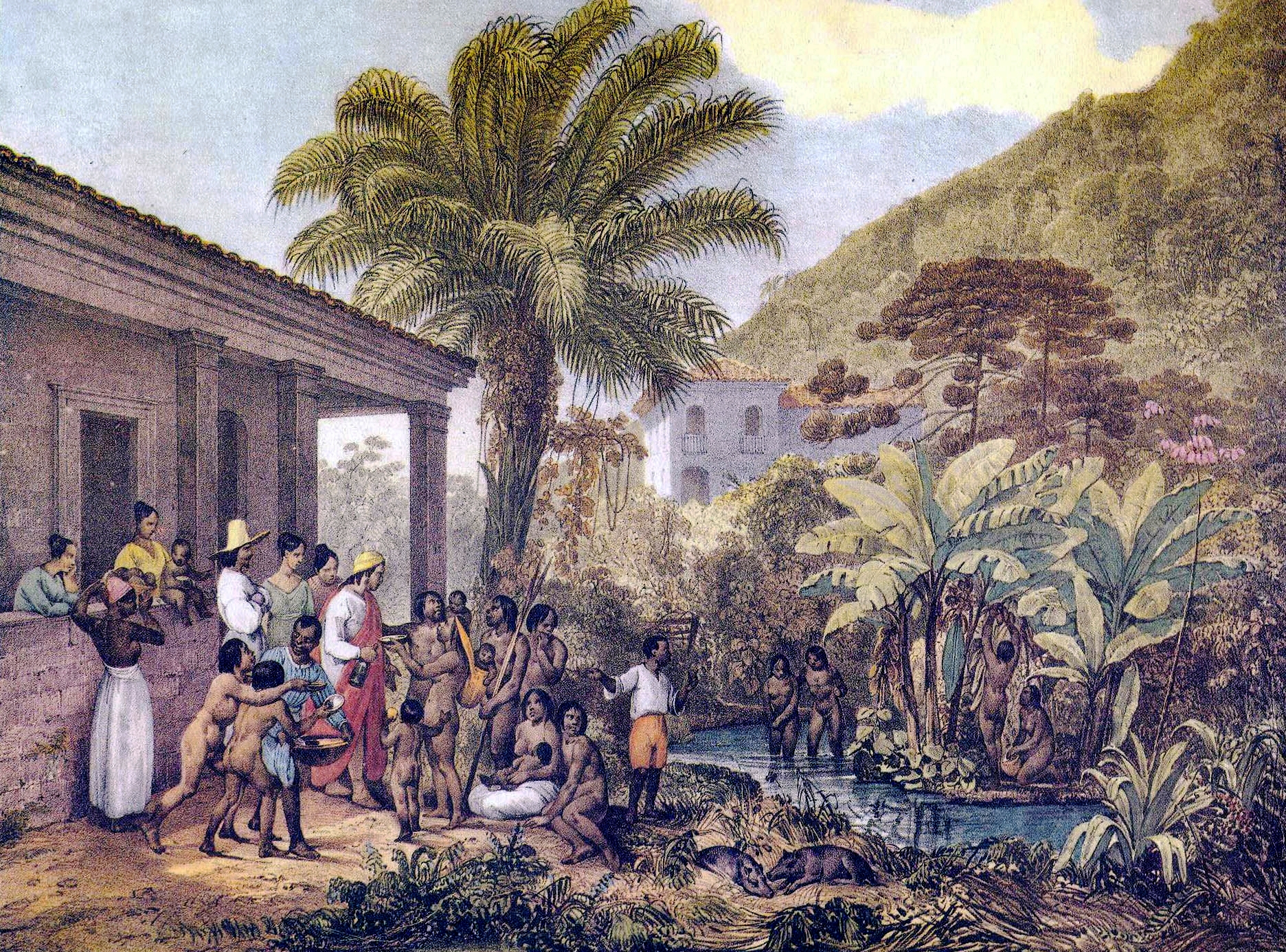
Indigenous people at a Brazilian farm plantation in Minas Gerais c. 1824

Scholars like Kat Anderson have suggested that the term Hunter-gatherer is reductive because it implies that Native Americans never stayed in one place long enough to affect the environment around them. However, many of the landscapes in the Americas today are due to the way the Natives of that area originally tended the land. Anderson specifically looks at California Natives and the practices they utilized to tame their land. Some of these practices included pruning, weeding, sowing, burning, and selective harvesting. These practices allowed them to take from the environment in a sustainable manner for centuries.

California Indians view the idea of wilderness in a negative light. They believe that wilderness is the result of humans losing their knowledge of the natural world and how to care for it. When the earth turns back to wilderness after the connection with humans is lost then the plants and animals will retreat and hide from the humans.

== See also ==
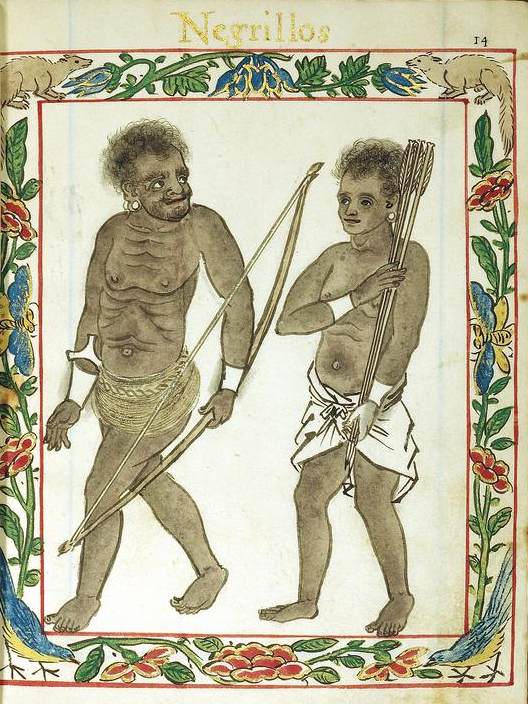
Negritos (Negrillos) in the Philippines, 1595

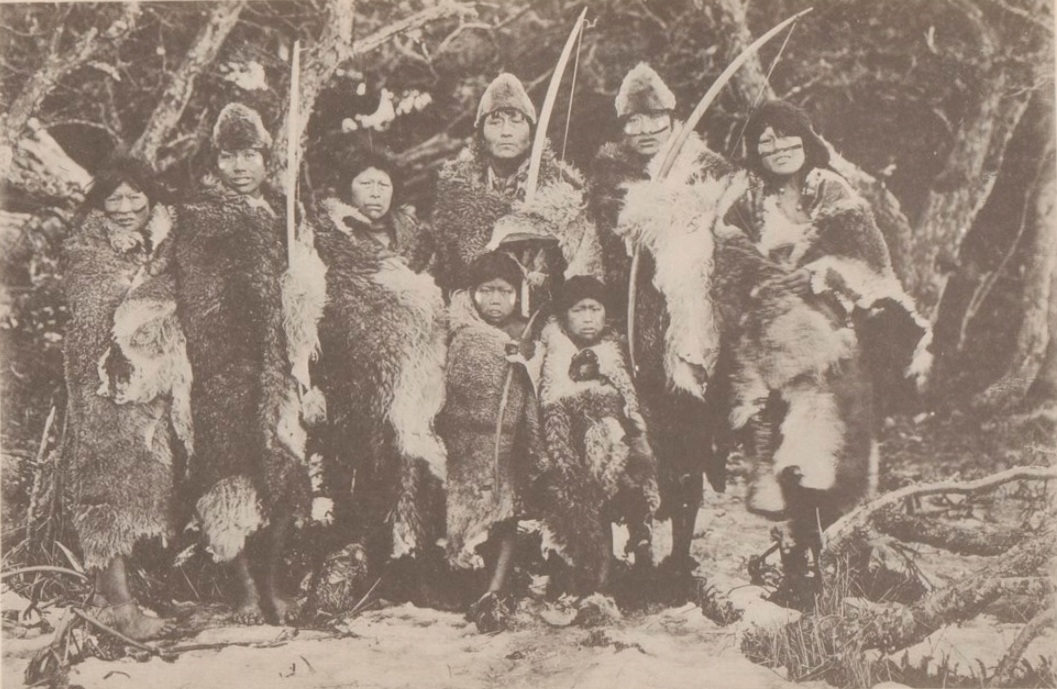
The Selkʼnam of Tierra del Fuego, c. 1915

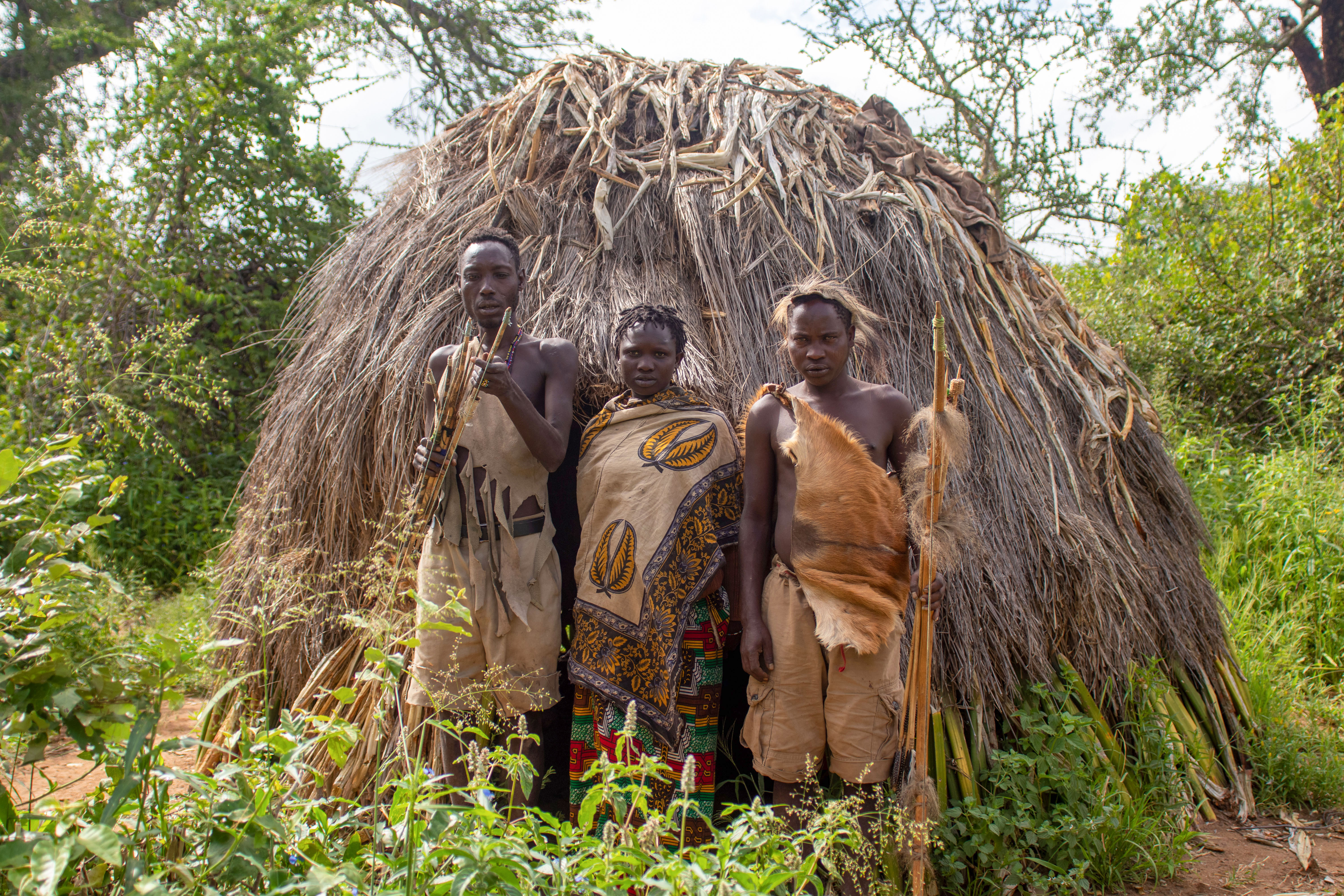
Hadza hunter-gatherers in Tanzania, 2022

- Beachcombing
- Nomads
- Cro-Magnon
- Homo floresiensis
- Human migration
- Human history
- Indigenous peoples
- Neanderthals
- Neolithic Revolution
- Origins of society
- Paleolithic
- Prehistoric music
- Primitive skills
- Stateless society
- Tribe
- Clan
- Caucasian Hunter-Gatherer
- Comb Ceramic culture
- Pitted Ware culture
- Uncontacted peoples

=== Modern hunter-gatherer groups ===
- Aka people
- Andamanese people
- Angu people
- Awá-Guajá people
- Batek people
- Efé people
- Fuegians
- Hadza people
- Indigenous peoples of the Pacific Northwest Coast
- Inuit
- Iñupiat
- Jarawa people (Andaman Islands)
- Kawahiva people
- Ket people
- Maniq people
- Mbuti people
- Mlabri people
- Moriori people
- Nukak people
- Onge people
- Orang Rimba
- Penan people
- Pirahã people
- Raute people
- San people
- Semang people
- Sentinelese people
- Tjimba people
- Twa
- Yaruro (Pumé) people
- Ye'kuana people
- Yupik people

=== Social movements ===
- Anarcho-primitivism, which strives for the abolishment of civilization and the return to a life in the wild.
- Freeganism involves gathering of food (and sometimes other materials) in the context of an urban or suburban environment.
- Gleaning involves the gathering of food that traditional farmers have left behind in their fields.
- Paleolithic diet, which strives to achieve a diet similar to that of ancient hunter-gatherer groups.
