= Bob Bailey =

Bob Bailey may refer to:

- Bob Bailey (actor) (1913–1983), American radio actor
- Bob Bailey (baseball) (1942–2018), American third baseman in Major League Baseball
- Bob Bailey (ice hockey) (1931–2003), Canadian ice hockey right winger
- Bob Bailey (rugby league), former New Zealand rugby league player and coach
- Bob Bailey (politician) (born c. 1951), member of the Ontario legislature
- Bob Bailey (photographer) (1916–2001), United States Marine Corps World War II era combat photographer
- Bob Bailey (animal trainer), behaviorist and husband of Marian Breland Bailey
- Bobby Bailey, Invisible Children documentary filmmaker

== See also ==
- Bobby Bailey (disambiguation)
- Robert Bailey (disambiguation)
