= Robert Baillie (disambiguation) =

Robert Baillie (1602–1662) was a Scottish divine and writer.

Robert Baillie may also refer to:

- Robert Baillie (priest) (1724–1806), Anglican priest in Ireland
- Baillie of Jerviswood (c. 1634–1684), implicated in the Rye House Plot
- Robert Baillie of Westwood, Baillie, British engineer

== See also ==
- Robert Baillie-Hamilton (1828–1891), British politician
- Robert Bailey (disambiguation)
