= R. D. Bailey Lake =

Lake in West Virginia, U.S.

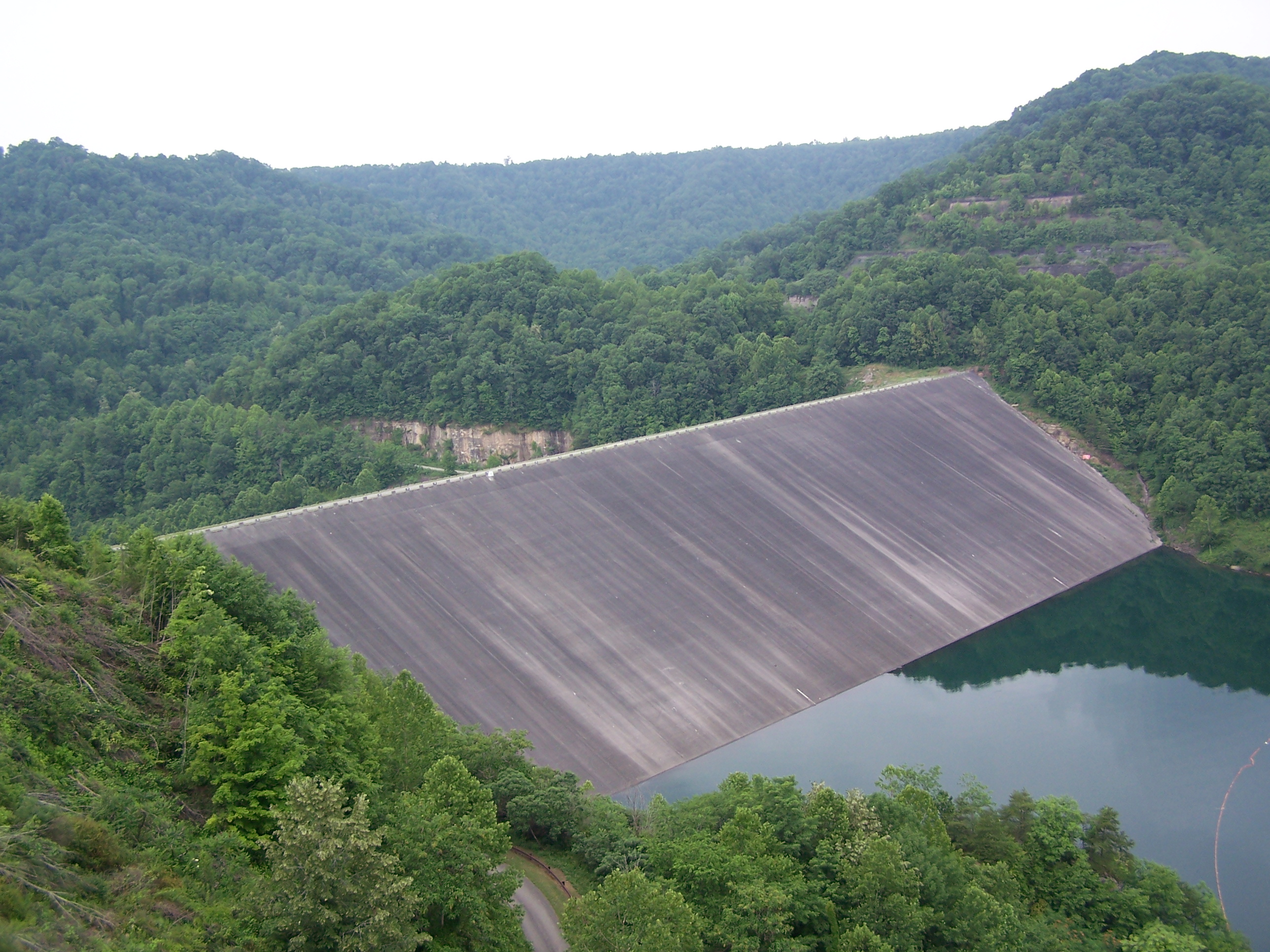
- Dam

- Location within West Virginia Location within the United States
- Location: Wyoming / Mingo counties, West Virginia, United States
- Coordinates: 37°36′00″N 81°49′20″W
- Type: reservoir
- Primary inflows: Guyandotte River
- Primary outflows: Guyandotte River
- Basin countries: United States
- Surface elevation: 1,043 feet (318 m)

R. D. Bailey Lake is located on the Guyandotte River in Wyoming and Mingo Counties in West Virginia, 3.3 miles (5.3 km) east of Justice. Originally referred to as Justice Reservoir, the lake was named by Congressional action, Public Law 90-46, on July 4, 1967 for Robert D. Bailey, Sr., a prominent jurist, diarist, and citizen of Pineville. R. D. Bailey lake was dedicated in August 1980.

The R. D. Bailey Dam is 310 feet (94 m) high with a top length of 1,370 feet (420 m). A minimum pool with a surface area of 440 acres (1.8 km^{2}) is maintained in the winter months. A seasonal pool for recreation and water quality control with a surface area of 630 acres (2.5 km^{2}) is maintained during the summer. The lake's remaining storage capacity is for flood control.

== Photo gallery ==
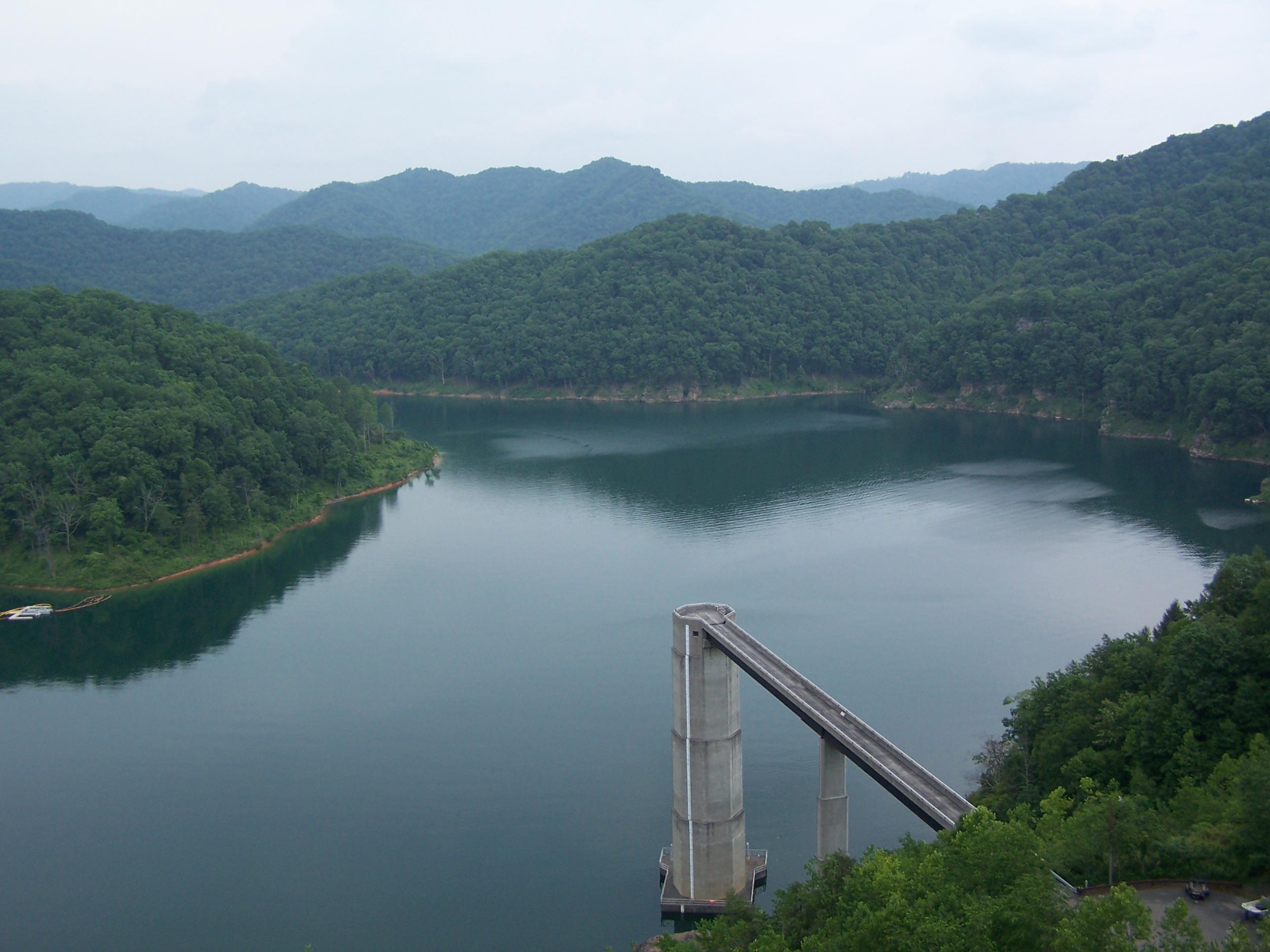
Intake tower at the dam

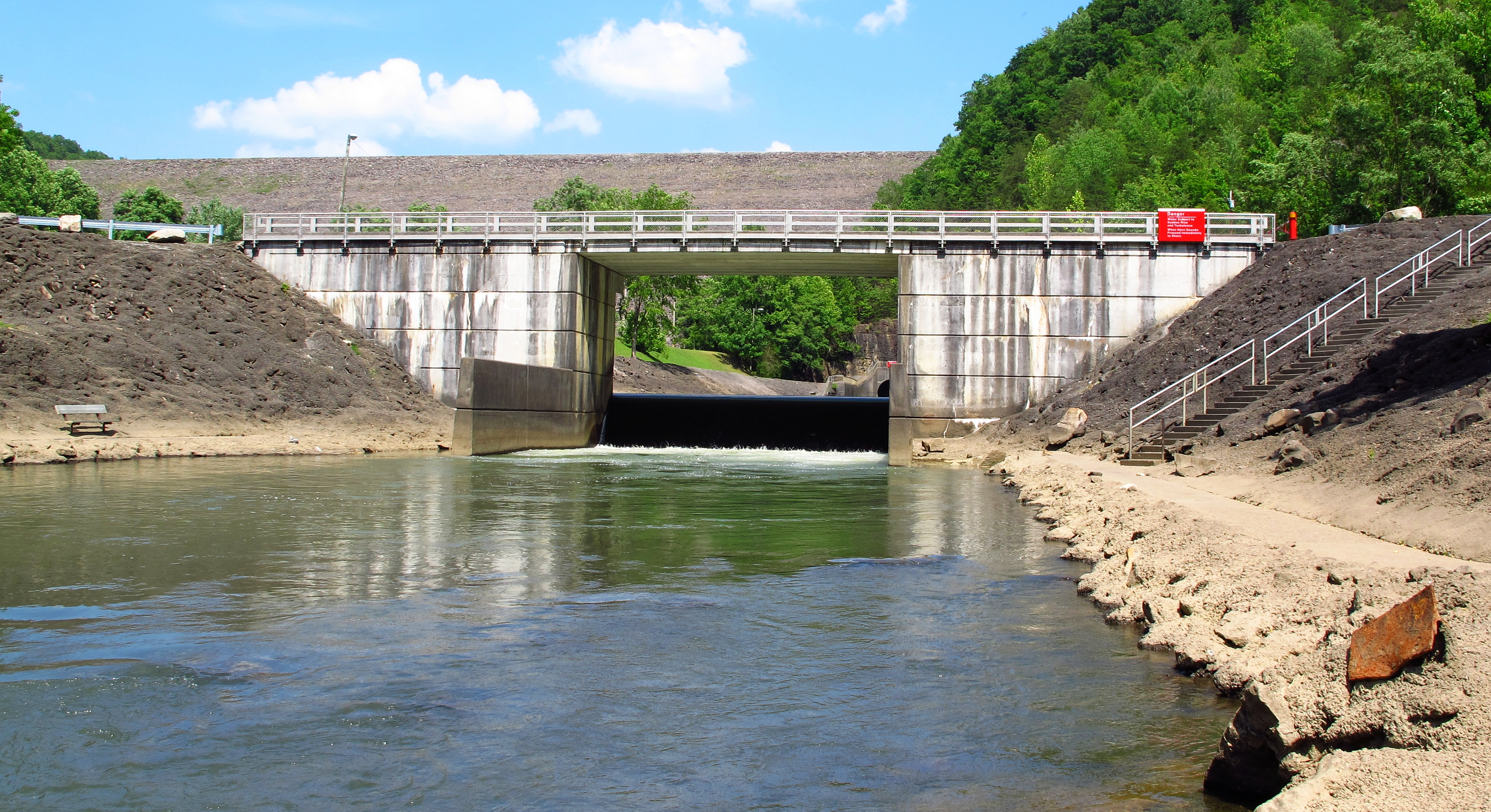
Outflow
