= Robert D. Bailey Sr. =

American politician

R. D. Bailey Sr.

Chair of the West Virginia Democratic Party
- In office March 24, 1946 – January 31, 1948
- Preceded by: Joe L. Smith
- Succeeded by: J. Howard Myers

Member of the West Virginia Senate from the 9th district
- In office January 12, 1943 – December 1, 1944
- Appointed by: Matthew M. Neely
- Preceded by: Ward Wylie
- Succeeded by: Ward Wylie

Personal details
- Born: Robert Darias Bailey; July 26, 1883 Baileysville, West Virginia
- Died: October 24, 1961 (aged 78) Welch, West Virginia
- Party: Democratic
- Spouse: Sue Starkey (m. 1911)
- Children: 2, including Robert Jr.
- Education: Valparaiso University (LLB)

Robert Darias Bailey Sr. (July 26, 1883 – October 24, 1961), better known as R. D. Bailey or "Judge Bailey," was a Democratic politician in West Virginia.

Bailey was a lawyer who represented timber and railroad companies before he was elected judge, then a part-time position. He presided over the trials of the coal miners involved in the Battle of Matewan, the events of which are depicted in the movie Matewan. His diaries and notes formed the basis for the movie script.

He was appointed by Governor Matthew M. Neely to serve the remaining two years of Ward Wylie's term in the West Virginia Senate after Wylie resigned to enter military service in World War II. He later served for a time on the West Virginia Board of Education and as chair of the West Virginia Democratic Party. In 1928 and 1948, he ran for governor but lost the primary election on both occasions. He died in 1961.

R. D. Bailey Lake is named for him.

His son, Robert D. Bailey Jr., served as Secretary of State of West Virginia from 1965 to 1969.
