= Robert D. Bailey Jr. =

American attorney and politician

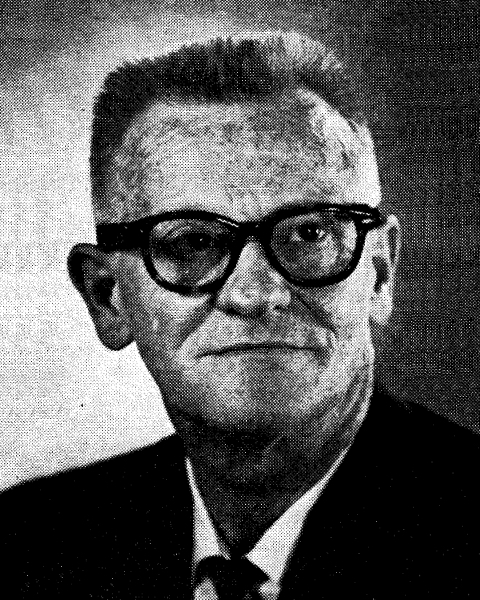

21st Secretary of State of West Virginia
- In office May 17, 1965 – January 13, 1969
- Governor: Hulett C. Smith
- Preceded by: Joe F. Burdett
- Succeeded by: Jay Rockefeller

Personal details
- Born: Robert Darias Bailey Jr. October 12, 1912 Baileysville, West Virginia
- Died: September 29, 1994 (aged 81) Princeton, West Virginia
- Party: Democratic
- Spouse: Jean Hickman (m. 1944)
- Children: 1
- Education: Concord College; Washington & Lee University

Military service
- Allegiance: United States
- Branch/service: United States Army
- Years of service: 1943–1946
- Rank: Master sergeant
- Battles/wars: World War II

Robert Darias Bailey Jr. (October 12, 1912 – September 29, 1994) was West Virginia Secretary of State from 1965 to 1969. He was a graduate of Concord College and Washington and Lee University School of Law.

Born in Baileysville, he was the son of Robert D. Bailey Sr. and Sue Starkey Bailey. During World War II, he served in the U.S. Army in the European Theater. Admitted to the bar in 1934, he inherited his father's law practice, including representation of railroads and timber companies in southern West Virginia, based in his home town of Pineville. His own wide-ranging business involvements included the Castle Rock Bank of Pineville, Radio Station WWYO, the Independent Herald newspaper, and the Pineville Gas Company.

A Democrat, he was Wyoming County Prosecuting Attorney for a number of non-consecutive terms between 1943 and 1961. He was appointed West Virginia Secretary of State by Governor Hulett C. Smith on May 17, 1965, and was elected in 1966, serving until January 1969.

After Smith's term ended, Bailey returned to private practice in his home town of Pineville.

He died on September 29, 1994, in Princeton, West Virginia, and was survived by his wife Jean H. Bailey, his son Robert D. Bailey III, and his three grandchildren, Angela Sue Osborn, Robert Darias Bailey IV, and Micah Alexander Bailey. Bailey was an avid fisherman, gardener, and local philanthropist.

Legal offices
Preceded by Clarence Worrell	Prosecuting Attorney of Wyoming County, West Virginia; 1953–1961	Succeeded by D. Grove Moler
Political offices
Preceded by Joe F. Burdett	Secretary of State of West Virginia; 1965–1969	Succeeded by Jay Rockefeller
