= Robert Bailey (epidemiologist) =

American epidemiologist

Robert C. Bailey
- Education: Harvard University (Ph.D.); Emory University (MPH)
- Known for: Work on circumcision and HIV prevention
- Awards: 2008 Researcher of the Year Award from the University of Illinois at Chicago
- Scientific career
- Fields: Epidemiology
- Workplaces: University of Illinois at Chicago

Robert C. Bailey is an American epidemiologist and professor of epidemiology at the University of Illinois at Chicago (UIC) School of Public Health. He is also an adjunct professor in UIC's Department of Anthropology, a research associate at Chicago's Field Museum, and a visiting lecturer at the University of Nairobi.

== Education ==
After receiving his Ph.D. in biological anthropology from Harvard University, Bailey received his MPH from Emory University's Rollins School of Public Health in 1997.

== Research ==
Bailey is known for researching the ability of circumcision to prevent HIV transmission. In particular, he is known for serving as the principal investigator for a randomized controlled trial of circumcision to prevent the transmission of HIV in Kisumu, Kenya. The trial was stopped early in December 2006, because its results showed that circumcision significantly reduced the risk of HIV infection. He subsequently helped design Kenya's circumcision program as an HIV/AIDS prevention strategy.

=== Potential adverse effects of circumcision ===
Bailey has also researched risk compensation among circumcised men in Kenya, finding no evidence that it is occurring there, and some evidence that the opposite may be happening. His work has also indicated that complication rates for circumcision are much lower (18%) when performed in medical settings than when performed traditionally (35%).

== Awards ==
In 2008, Bailey was named one of UIC's Researchers of the Year. In 2010, he received the Distinguished Achievement Award from the RSPH Alumni Association.
