= Richard Borshay Lee =

Canadian anthropologist (born 1937)

Richard Borshay Lee OC FRSC (born 20 September 1937) is a Canadian anthropologist and University Professor Emeritus of Anthropology at the University of Toronto, where he also holds a cross-appointment in the Human Biology Program and a Senior Fellowship at New College. He is internationally recognised for his pioneering long-term fieldwork among the Ju/'hoansi (also known as the !Kung San), a hunter-gatherer people of the Kalahari Desert in Botswana and Namibia, conducted over more than five decades beginning in 1963.

Lee is best known for his book The !Kung San: Men, Women and Work in a Foraging Society (1979), which won the 1980 Anisfield-Wolf Book Award and the 1980 Herskovits Award of the African Studies Association. With Irven DeVore, he co-organised the landmark 1966 "Man the Hunter" symposium at the University of Chicago, the proceedings of which became one of the most cited volumes in hunter-gatherer studies. His quantitative data on Ju/'hoansi subsistence contributed centrally to Marshall Sahlins's influential formulation of the "original affluent society" thesis.

He is a Fellow of the Royal Society of Canada, a Foreign Associate of the US National Academy of Sciences (elected 2012), a Foreign Honorary Member of the American Academy of Arts and Sciences, and was appointed an Officer of the Order of Canada in 2016.

== Early life and education ==
Richard Borshay Lee was born on 20 September 1937. He completed his undergraduate and postgraduate studies at the University of Toronto, earning a Bachelor of Arts in Anthropology in 1959 and a Master of Arts in Anthropology in 1961.

He then moved to the University of California, Berkeley, where he conducted graduate research including a primate field study in Kenya in 1963. He was awarded his Doctor of Philosophy in Anthropology from Berkeley in 1965, with a dissertation titled Subsistence Ecology of !Kung Bushmen.

== Academic career ==
=== Harvard University (1965–1970) ===
Following his doctorate, Lee was appointed Lecturer in Social Anthropology in the Department of Social Relations at Harvard University from 1965 to 1967. He then held a Research Fellowship in the Department of Social Relations and the Center for Behavioral Sciences at Harvard from 1967 to 1970.

During this period, he co-founded with Irven DeVore the Harvard Kalahari Research Group, which became one of the most productive centres for hunter-gatherer studies in the world, training a generation of scholars who went on to make significant contributions in their own right.

=== Rutgers University (1970–1972) ===
Lee was appointed Associate Professor of Anthropology with tenure at Rutgers University, New Jersey, from 1970 to 1972.

=== University of Toronto (1972–2007) ===
Lee joined the University of Toronto as Associate Professor of Anthropology in 1972 and was promoted to full Professor with tenure in 1976. In 1999 he was appointed University Professor, the highest academic rank at the University of Toronto, recognising scholars of exceptional distinction whose work has transcended disciplinary boundaries. He retired as University Professor Emeritus in 2007.

During his tenure at Toronto he held a Connaught Senior Fellowship in the Social Sciences (1982–83), a Visiting Professorship at Columbia University, New York (Fall 1980), a Visiting Senior Fellowship at the Australian National University, Canberra (1995), and a Visiting Scholarship at the Center for African Area Studies, Kyoto University, Japan (Fall 2001).

=== Subsequent positions ===
Following retirement from Toronto, Lee was a Visiting Professor at Galen University, San Ignacio, Belize (2007–08).

== Fieldwork ==
Lee's primary fieldwork was conducted among the Ju/'hoansi of the Dobe area of northwest Botswana and later the Nyae Nyae area of Namibia, beginning with his first visit in 1963 and continuing through multiple return visits spanning more than four decades: 1963–65, 1967–70, 1973, 1980, 1983, 1985–86, 1987, 1993, 1999, 2003, 2005, 2009–11, and 2013.

His early fieldwork focused on documenting the subsistence ecology, social organisation, diet, and work patterns of the Ju/'hoansi at a time when they were still living primarily as hunter-gatherers. Later fieldwork addressed social and cultural aspects of AIDS prevention in Namibia and Botswana (1996–2013) and oral history and archaeology of colonial Namibia and Botswana (1995–97).

He also conducted ethnographic fieldwork with indigenous peoples in Canada, including the Ojibwa of Ontario (1960), the Innu of Labrador (1984), and the Gitxsan-Wet'suwet'en of British Columbia (1986, 1990).

== Scholarship and research ==
=== The "Man the Hunter" symposium (1966) ===
In 1966, Lee and Irven DeVore co-organised the "Man the Hunter" symposium at the University of Chicago, bringing together leading researchers on hunter-gatherer societies from around the world. The resulting edited volume, Man the Hunter (Aldine, 1968), became one of the most widely cited works in anthropology, reshaping scholarly understanding of pre-agricultural human life.

At the symposium, Lee presented quantitative data on the Ju/'hoansi showing that they were able to meet their subsistence needs by working approximately fifteen hours per week in food production. This data was a key source for Marshall Sahlins's subsequent formulation of the "original affluent society" thesis, which argued that hunter-gatherers had achieved a form of material sufficiency through limited wants rather than maximal production.

=== The !Kung San and Dobe Ju/'hoansi ===
Lee's most influential work is The !Kung San: Men, Women and Work in a Foraging Society (Cambridge University Press, 1979), a comprehensive study of Ju/'hoansi subsistence, social organisation, gender relations, and ecology. The book won the 1980 Anisfield-Wolf Book Award and the 1980 Herskovits Award of the African Studies Association.

His ethnographic monograph The Dobe !Kung (Holt, Rinehart and Winston, 1983), revised as The Dobe Ju/'hoansi in its second (1993), third (2003), and fourth (2013) editions, became one of the most widely used teaching texts in cultural anthropology globally.

=== The Kalahari Debate ===
Lee's work became central to what became known as the "Kalahari Debate," a scholarly controversy concerning the degree to which the Ju/'hoansi and other San peoples had been influenced by contact with neighbouring Bantu-speaking agricultural peoples and with colonial and post-colonial states. Lee argued for the validity of using Ju/'hoansi society as a model for understanding pre-agricultural human life, a position challenged by revisionist scholars who emphasised the long history of San interaction with neighbouring peoples.

=== Medical anthropology and HIV/AIDS ===
From the mid-1990s, Lee's research increasingly focused on the social and cultural dimensions of the HIV/AIDS epidemic in southern Africa. He received funding from the National Institutes of Health via Columbia University School of Public Health (1996–2001) and subsequently from the University of Toronto (2000–05) for work on AIDS awareness and education in Namibia and Botswana.

=== Indigenous rights ===
Lee was active in advocacy for the rights of San peoples of southern Africa throughout his career. He co-edited a special issue of Cultural Survival Quarterly on "The Kalahari San: Self-Determination in the Desert" (2002) with Robert Hitchcock and Megan Biesele, and contributed to international discussions of indigenous land rights and cultural survival.

== Professional activities ==
Lee was a founding member of Anthropologists for Radical Political Action (ARPA), established during the Vietnam War era. He served as president of the Canadian Ethnology Society, which was subsequently renamed the Canadian Anthropology Society, and continued as a past president of that organisation.

In 2003, the journal Anthropologica dedicated an entire issue to Lee's scholarly contributions.

== Awards and honours ==
- 1980: Anisfield-Wolf Book Award, for The !Kung San
- 1980: Melville J. Herskovits Award, African Studies Association, for The !Kung San
- 1999: Appointed University Professor, University of Toronto
- 2005: Elected Foreign Honorary Member, American Academy of Arts and Sciences
- 2005: Elected Fellow, Royal Society of Canada
- 2012: Elected Foreign Associate, US National Academy of Sciences
- 2016: Appointed Officer of the Order of Canada

== Selected bibliography ==
- Lee, R.B. and DeVore, I. (eds.) (1968). Man the Hunter. Chicago: Aldine Publishing.
- Lee, R.B. and DeVore, I. (eds.) (1976). Kalahari Hunter-Gatherers: Studies of the !Kung San and their Neighbours. Cambridge: Harvard University Press.
- Lee, R.B. (1979). The !Kung San: Men, Women and Work in a Foraging Society. Cambridge: Cambridge University Press.
- Leacock, E. and Lee, R.B. (eds.) (1982). Politics and History in Band Societies. Cambridge: Cambridge University Press.
- Lee, R.B. (1983). The Dobe !Kung. New York: Holt, Rinehart and Winston. (Revised as The Dobe Ju/'hoansi, 2nd ed. 1993; 3rd ed. 2003; 4th ed. 2013, Cengage Wadsworth.)
- Lee, R.B. and Daly, R. (eds.) (1999). The Cambridge Encyclopedia of Hunters and Gatherers. Cambridge: Cambridge University Press.
- Opini, B. and Lee, R.B. (2011). The Africans Thought of It: Amazing Innovations. Toronto: Annick Press.
- Lee, R.B. (2014). "Hunter-gatherers on the best-seller list: Steven Pinker and the 'Bellicose School's' treatment of hunter-gatherer violence." Journal of Aggression, Conflict and Peace Research, 6(4): 216-228.
- Lee, R.B. (2016). "The Anti-Imperialist Tradition in North American Anthropology: Vietnam, the Left Academy, and the Founding of ARPA." Dialectical Anthropology, 40: 59-67.
- Lee, R.B. (2018). "Hunter-Gatherers and Human Evolution: New Light on Old Debates." Annual Review of Anthropology, 47: 513-531.
