= ǃKung people =

Ethnic group in Southern Africa

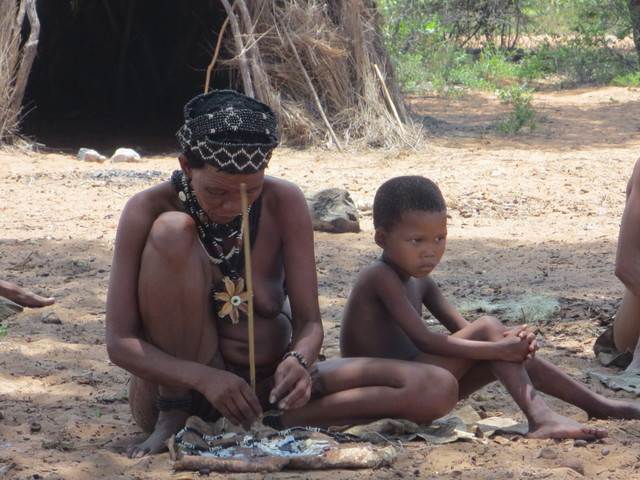
ǃKung woman making jewelry next to a child.

The ǃKung (/ˈkʊŋ/ (Note: The ⟨ǃ⟩ indicates an alveolar click, which is not pronounced in English.) KUUNG) are one of the San peoples who live mostly on the western edge of the Kalahari desert, Ovamboland (northern Namibia and southern Angola), and Botswana. The names ǃKung (ǃXun) and Ju are variant words for 'people', preferred by different ǃKung groups. This band level society used traditional methods of hunting and gathering for subsistence up until the 1970s. Today, the great majority of ǃKung people live in the villages of Bantu pastoralists and European ranchers.

== Beliefs ==
The ǃKung people of Southern Africa recognize a Supreme Being, ǃXu, who is the creator and upholder of life. Like other African High Gods, he also punishes man by means of the weather, and the Otjimpolo-ǃKung know him as Erob, who "knows everything". They also have animistic and animatistic beliefs.

Amongst the ǃKung there is a strong belief in the existence of spirits of the dead (llgauwasi) who live immortally in the sky. The llgauwasi can come to the earth and interact with humans. There is no particular connection to personal ancestors but the ǃKung fear the llgauwasi, pray to them for sympathy and mercy as well as call on them in anger.

The ǃKung practice shamanism to communicate with the spirit world, and to cure what they call "Star Sickness". The communication with the spirit world is done by a natural healer entering a trance state and running through a fire, thereby chasing away bad spirits. Star Sickness is cured by laying hands on the diseased. Nisa, a ǃKung woman, reported through anthropologist Marjorie Shostak that a healer in training is given a root to help induce trance. Nisa said, "I drank it a number of times and threw up again and again. Finally, I started to tremble. People rubbed my body as I sat there feeling the effect getting stronger and stronger. ... Trance-medicine really hurts! As you begin to trance, the nǀum [power to heal] slowly heats inside you and pulls at you. It rises until it grabs your insides and takes your thoughts away."

== Healing rites ==
Healing rites are a primary part of the ǃKung culture. In the ǃKung state of mind, having health is equivalent to having social harmony, meaning that relationships within the group are stable and open between other people. Any ǃKung can become a healer because it "is a status accessible to all," but it is a grand aspiration of many members because of its importance. Even though there is no restriction of the power, "nearly half the men and one-third of the women are acknowledged of having the power to heal," but with the responsibility comes great pain and hardship. To become a healer, aspirants must become an apprentice and learn from older healers. Their training includes the older healer having to "go into a trance to teach the novices, rubbing their own sweat onto the pupils' centers – their bellies, backs, foreheads, and spines." "Most of the apprentices have the intentions of becoming a healer but then become frightened or have a lack of ambition and discontinue."

The ǃKung term for this powerful healing force is nǀum. This force resides in the bellies of men and women who have gone through the training and have become a healer. Healing can be transmitted through the ǃkia dance that begins at sundown and continues through the night. The ǃkia can be translated as "trance" which can give a physical image of a sleeping enchantment. While they dance, "in preparation for entering a trance state to effect a cure, the substance [the nǀum] heats up and, boiling, travels up the healer's spine to explode with therapeutic power in the brain." While the healers are in the trance they propel themselves in a journey to seek out the sickness and argue with the spirits. Women on the other hand have a special medicine called the gwah which starts in the stomachs and kidneys. During the Drum Dance, they enter the ǃkia state and the gwah travels up the spine and lodges in the neck. In order to obtain the gwah power the women, "chop up the root of a short shrub, boil it into a tea and drink it." They do not need to drink the tea every time because the power they obtain lasts a lifetime.

The community of the ǃKung fully supports the healers and depends heavily on them. They have trust in the healers and the teachers to guide them psychologically and spiritually through life. The ǃKung have a saying: "Healing makes their hearts happy, and a happy heart is one that reflects a sense of community." Because of their longing to keep the peace between people, their community is tranquil.

== Childbirth ==
ǃKung women usually experience their first menstruation at the age of 16½, their first birth at 19½ and their last birth by their late 30s. ǃKung women often give birth unassisted, walking away from the village camp as far as a mile during labour and bearing the child alone, delivering it into a small leaf-lined hole dug into the warm sand. The child's cord is not clamped or cut (a form of Lotus birth or umbilical nonseverance), and the placenta is delivered and put next to the child, as guardian. Shortly thereafter, the baby-placenta is lightly covered with another large leaf, and the new mother walks a short way to verbally alert the older women of the completed birth, at which time they join the mother and child in a ritual welcoming. If a laboring woman is delayed in returning to the village once she has left to give birth, the older women will come looking for her to assist; however, it is said to be a rare occurrence.

Time between the births of children is traditionally about 3–5 years. Children are nursed for 3–5 years, ending when the mother is pregnant with another child. This long period of time between children makes traveling long distances on foot – like to a gathering site or new settlement – easier, since fewer children require carrying and population numbers remain controlled.

During times of deprivation, infanticide was permitted to preserve resources. The ǃKung people do not use contraceptives and generally do not practice abstinence, yet experience low fertility rates.

== Gender roles ==
Traditionally, especially among Juǀʼhoansi ǃKung, women generally collect plant foods and water while men hunt. However, these gender roles are not strict and people do all jobs as needed with little or no stigma.

Women generally take care of children and prepare food. However, this does not restrict them to their homes, since these activities are generally done with, or close to, others, so women can socialize and help each other. Men are also engaged in these activities.

Children are raised in village groups of other children of a wide age range. Sexual activities amongst children are seen as natural play for both sexes.

ǃKung women often share an intimate sociability and spend many hours together discussing their lives, enjoying each other's company and children. In the short documentary film A Group of Women, ǃKung women rest, talk and nurse their babies while lying in the shade of a baobab tree. This illustrates "collective mothering", where several women support each other and share the nurturing role.

=== Marriage ===
Marriage is the major focus of alliance formation between groups of ǃKung. When a woman starts to develop, she is considered ready for marriage. Every first marriage is arranged. The culture of the ǃKung is "being directed at marriage itself, rather than at a specific man." Even though it does not matter who the man is, the woman's family is looking for a specific type of man. The man should not be too much older than the woman, should preferably be unmarried rather than divorced, should be able to hunt, and should be willing to take on the responsibilities of the wife's family. The latter is because a woman's family depends heavily on her husband's family, particularly through trade, when there are times of scarcity.

On the marriage day, the tradition is the "marriage-by-capture" ceremony in which the bride is forcibly removed from her hut and presented to her groom. During the ceremony, the bride has her head covered and is carried and then laid down in the hut while the groom is led to the hut and sits beside the door. The couple stay respectfully apart from each other and do not join the wedding festivities. After the party is over, they spend the night together and the next morning they are ceremonially rubbed with oil by the husband's mother.

Marriage is generally between a man in his twenties and a girl in her teens (14–18 years old). Newlyweds live in the same village as the wife's family so she has family support during her new life. Often, young wives return to their parents' houses to sleep until they become comfortable with their husbands. During this time, the husband will hunt for his wife's family (a form of bridewealth). If the couple never becomes comfortable, separation is acceptable, prompted by either partner. If they do become a stable couple, they can reside with either partner's family, settling with whichever is beneficial at the time. Divorce remains possible throughout marriage. Extramarital sex is not condoned, but is equally acceptable for each spouse. Domestic violence is prevented because villages are small and close and houses are open so that neighbors and relatives can intervene as needed.

=== Divorce ===
Girls who are displeased with their parents' selection may violently protest against the marriage by kicking and screaming and running away at the end of the ceremony. After she has run away, this may result in the dissolution of the arrangement.

Half of all first-time marriages end in divorce, but because it is common, the divorce process is not long. Anthropologist Marjorie Shostak generalizes that, "Everyone in the village expresses a point of view" on the marriage and if the couple should be divorced or not. After the village weighs in, they are divorced and can live in their separate huts with their family. Relations between divorced individuals are usually quite amicable, with former partners living near one another and maintaining a cordial relationship. After a woman's first divorce, she is free to marry a man of her choosing or stay single and live on her own.

== Social structure and hierarchy ==
Unlike other complex food-foraging groups, it is unusual for the ǃKung to have a chieftain or headman in a position of power over the other members. These San are not devoid of leadership, but neither are they dependent on it. San groups of the Southern Kalahari have had chieftains in the past; however, there is a somewhat complicated process to gain that position. Chieftainship within these San groups is not a position with the greatest power, as they have the same social status as those members of "aged years". Becoming chieftain is mostly nominal, though there are some responsibilities the chieftain assumes, such as becoming the group's "logical head". This duty entails such roles as dividing up the meat from hunters' kills; these leaders do not receive a larger portion than any other member of the village. The ǃKung people have given name to the Theory of Regal and Kungic Societal Structures due to their peacefulness and egalitarian social structure.

== Use of kinship terms ==
Kinship is one of the central organizing principles for societies like the ǃKung. Richard Borshay Lee breaks ǃKung kinship principles down into three different sets (Kinship I, Kinship II, and Kinship III or wi). Kinship I follows conventional kin terms (father, mother, brother, sister) and is based on genealogical position. Kinship II applies to name relationships, meaning that people who share the same name (ǃkunǃa) are treated as though they are kin of the same family and are assigned the same kinship term. This is a common occurrence as there are a limited number of ǃKung names. Kung names are also strictly gendered meaning that men and women cannot share the same name. Names are passed down from ancestors according to a strict set of rules, though parents are never allowed to name their children after themselves.

There is a principle of alternating generations in terms of "joking" (k”ai) and "avoidance" (kwa) relations. One's own generation and the second generation up and down are considered "joking" relations and are treated with relaxed affection. The first generations above and below one are "avoidance" relations and are treated in a respectful and reserved manner. Every member of ǃKung society fits into one of these categories, there are no neutral people.

Kinship III or wi has to do with the principles of relative age status. In situations where there are two people trying to decide what kin terms to use, the older person makes the ultimate decision. This is especially important in cultures like the ǃKung as there are not many status distinctions.

== Hunting rites ==
Hunting can take days of tracking, attacking, and following a wounded animal. The Juǀʼhoansi have rites to prevent arrogance amongst male hunters. When a man kills an animal, he does not take it directly into the settlement, but leaves the body and returns as if he was unsuccessful. An older man will inquire about his hunt and remark upon his failure, to which the hunter must avoid credit and accept humility. The next day, a group will go "see if some small animal was nicked by an arrow." Upon finding the quarry, the hunter will be reassured of the little value of the kill which is finally returned. Additionally, the kill may belong not to him, but to the person who gave him arrows (man or woman), who then follows rules on how to distribute the meat to everyone in the group. Upon returning from a successful hunt, if the kill is transportable, it will be brought back to the village. The ǃKung promote the belief of community well-being, and so the village elders or "those of mature years" will allot meat to the members of the group. The ǃKung also believe in the betterment of their neighbors, so if the kill is too large to move or there is a surplus of meat, word will be spread to villages that are close by to come collect meat for themselves.

== Language ==
The ǃKung language, commonly called Ju, belongs to the Kxʼa language family, which used to be grouped within a hypothetical Khoisan language family, all of which make abundant use of phonemic click consonants.

== Recent history ==
Since the 1950s, the ǃKung population has increased. Cattle ranches have brought cows to their traditional lands. Cows eat the sparse vegetation which the ǃKung and their game animals need, as well as dirty the ǃKung water holes. This water pollution, along with the disappearance of native vegetation, has made disease more prevalent.

In addition to the problems involved in sharing water with cows, the ǃKung are less mobile than in the past. The current governments of Namibia and Botswana, where the ǃKung live, encourage permanent settlements with European style houses. With urban employment and industrialization, indigenous people are changing their nomadic lifestyle.

European-descended settlers have encouraged wage-paid agricultural labour, especially for men. Due to increased dependence on them and their access to wealth, men are valued more. Women, who traditionally prepared food, have taken up the preparation of millet. Millet is more difficult to process than traditional ǃKung foods, and therefore women must spend more time preparing food for their household, leaving less time for employment outside the home.

The changing gender roles, growing inequality between the sexes, and transformation from a wandering hunter-gatherer life-style to life in a village have contributed to more domestic violence, as women are more dependent on men and increasingly restricted from outside intervention through changing housing styles and arrangements. Houses that are less open and the collection of wealth also challenges traditional sharing ideology.

The ǃKung also face problems since their traditional lands are sought after by cattle ranchers, wildlife reserves, and state governments.

== In popular culture ==
- The protagonist in the film The Gods Must Be Crazy (1980) is a caricature of a ǃKung man.
- The American rock band Phish sometimes performs a song called "Kung" during their live performances.
- Ivy Dickens talks about the ǃKung people in Season 4 of Gossip Girl.
- Carl Sagan draws on the ǃKung's way of life in relation to science in his 1995 book The Demon-Haunted World. He also referred to them in his 1994 lecture "The Age of Exploration", based primarily on anthropologist Richard Borshay Lee's 1979 field study of the ǃKung San in the Botswanan part of the Kalahari Desert.
- Sebastian Junger refers to "one study in the 1960s" that found that the ǃKung people only needed to work as little as 12 hours a week to survive which is nearly one quarter the amount of time people need to work in modern society in his book Tribe.

== Notable individuals ==
- Nǃxau ǂToma
- Royal ǀUiǀoǀoo

== See also ==
- Kalahari Debate
- Matrilocal residence
- Original affluent society
- Platfontein
- Traditional African medicine
