= Mullens High School =

Defunct school in West Virginia, United States

Mullens High School was a high school located in Mullens, Wyoming County, West Virginia, United States. It was closed in 1998 after consolidating with nearby Pineville High School and Glen Rogers High School to form Wyoming East High School.

Students from nearby Herndon High School had been consolidated into Mullens High School when that school closed in 1992.

Mullens High School's mascot was the Rebels and the school colors were blue and gray.

Feeder schools for Mullens High School included Mullens Middle School and Herndon Consolidated Elementary and Middle School.

Athletics consisted of wrestling, tennis, baseball, volleyball, football and most prominently…basketball, the Mullens Rebels won seven State Basketball Championships amongst their 70 year run, those being in 1955 (Class A(now AAA)), 1970,1972 (Class AA), 1982, 1983, 1984 (Class A), as well as a State Championship in 1998 also, this being in the schools final year of operation. The Mullens Rebel Basketball program also accumulating three State Runner Up finishes. Those being in 1954, 1971, and 1981.

The Mullens Rebels also has two state football championships, those being in 1941, as well as a Co-Championship with Mount Hope High School in 1959 whenever, due to the weather present during the game, neither team was able to score, and at the end of regulation, the score read 0-0, the two teams would end up doing a coin flip for the trophy, and Mullens would lose the coin flip.

Individual State Wrestling Champions, Mike King in 1985, 1986, Derrick Hypes in 1994.

Individual Basketball Accolades include Herbie Brooks Receiving The Evans Award in 1984, as the State’s Top Basketball Player. He was also the States Annual Scoring Leader in 1983, and is also ranked 6th All-Time in West Virginia High School Boys Basketball Leading Scorers, with the record for most points ever scored in a West Virginia High School State Tournament Game (50, V. Parkersburg Catholic High), as well as the 29th most points scored in a single game by a single player.(60, V. Independence High.)

The Mullens Rebels also have a State Runners Up in Class “A” Football in 1956, State Runners Up in Class “A” Baseball in 1997, State Runners Up in Class “A” Cheer in 1991, as well as 1992.

== Notable alumni ==
- Jerome Anderson, Former Professional Basketball Player for the National Basketball Association (NBA). Member of the 1976 World Champion, Boston Celtics.
- Dan D'Antoni, former Head Men's Basketball Coach at Marshall University.
- Mike D'Antoni, Current Coaching Consultant for the New Orleans Pelicans of the National Basketball Association. Former NBA Head Basketball Coach and NBA Point Guard. NBA Coach of the Year in 2005 with the Phoenix Suns, and with the Houston Rockets in 2017.
- Terry Echols, Former NFL Linebacker, Pittsburgh Steelers
- Christy Martin, Boxer, WBC Champion, First Female Inducted into The International Boxing Hall of Fame
- Rick Tolley, Head Football Coach, Marshall University Thundering Herd Football Team, 1969-1970.
