= Matheny =

Matheny may refer to:

== Places ==
- Matheny, California, a census-designated place
- Matheny, West Virginia, an unincorporated community

== Other uses ==
- Matheny (surname)

== See also ==
- Metheny
