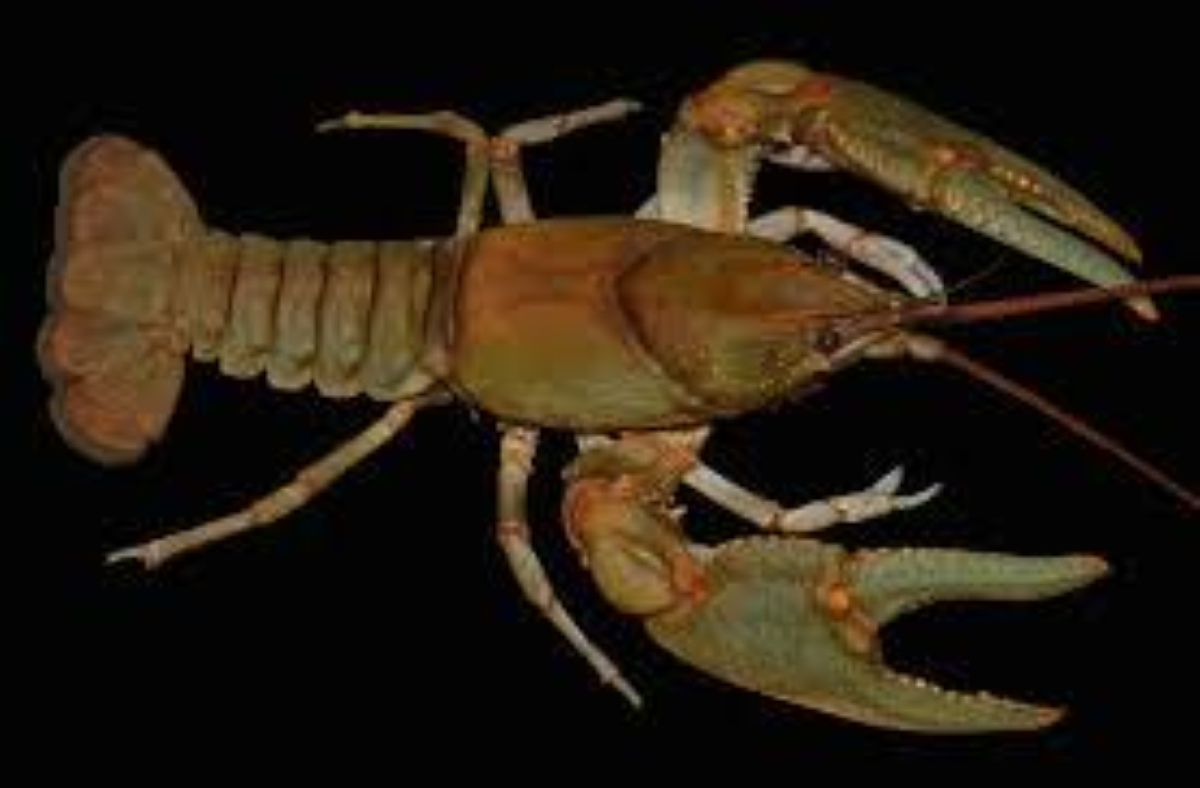

Conservation status
- Data Deficient (IUCN 3.1)

- Critically Imperiled (NatureServe)

Scientific classification
- Kingdom: Animalia
- Phylum: Arthropoda
- Clade: Pancrustacea
- Class: Malacostraca
- Order: Decapoda
- Suborder: Pleocyemata
- Family: Cambaridae
- Genus: Cambarus
- Species: C. veteranus

Binomial name
- Cambarus veteranus Faxon, 1914

= Cambarus veteranus =

Guyandotte River crayfish

Species of crayfish

The Guyandotte River crayfish (Cambarus veteranus) is a species of crayfish found in a small stream system in Wyoming County, West Virginia, US. They are closely related to the Big Sandy crayfish (C. callainus), and until recently, the two were thought to belong to the same species. The Guyandotte River crayfish is currently listed as Data Deficient by the IUCN and was listed under the Endangered Species Act with the Big Sandy crayfish on April 4, 2016.

== Description ==
Adult Guyandotte River crayfish are typically 75.7 to 101.6 millimetres (2.98 to 4.00 in) in length. Their shell covers range in colour from olive brown to light green with a blue cervical groove ranging in shade from light blue to aqua. Their walking legs are blue with chelae ranging in colour from light blue to a blue green. Some ways to differentiate the Guyandotte River crayfish from the Big Sandy crayfish include the narrower rostrum and claw set of the Big Sandy crayfish. Guyandotte River crayfish also have a lateral impression at the bottom of the stationary claw.

== Life history ==
Limited research has been done on the life history of the Guyandotte River crayfish. The following information on the life history of the Guyandotte River crayfish has largely been extrapolated from findings on the life history of the Big Sandy crayfish due to their extensive similarities.

The Guyandotte River crayfish reaches full maturation in its third year following 2 to 3 years of growth. The crayfish then reproduce for the first time during the "midsummer of the third or fourth year." The Guyandotte River crayfish are an egg-laying species. After their first time reproducing, they continue to mate annually until their death. Eggs are typically laid in the late summer or fall, and then hatch in the spring. Moulting then occurs in the late spring and early summer. The average lifespan of Guyandotte River crayfish "is thought to be 5 to 7 years, with the possibility of some individuals reaching 10 years of age."

== Ecology ==
=== Diet ===
The Guyandotte River crayfish can be described as opportunistic omnivores, meaning they will eat both plant materials and animal tissues, depending on accessibility. Research indicates that these crayfish typically prefer animal tissue over the plant material. According to C. veteranus researcher Dr. Zac Loughman, crayfish "help move energy up the food chain" by consuming "dead leaves, dead fish and other live and dead organisms."

== Behaviour ==
=== Mating behaviour ===
Guyandotte River crayfish movements captured using radio transmitters during the summer mating season suggest that females typically select a shelter to inhabit, and their mate later joins them in the chosen shelter. Females select their mating-season shelter "along banks or in slower moving water" and likely undergo a "seclusion period" where females will hide while bearing their eggs.

=== Foraging behaviour ===
Additional evidence captured using radio transmitters supports the theory that Guyandotte River crayfish engage in foraging behaviors at night.

=== Territorial behaviour ===
Male Guyandotte River crayfish have been recorded to venture as far as 480 metres (1,570 ft) over a period of seven days. On the other hand, female Guyandotte River crayfish have been observed to display more home ranging behavior, which means traveling short distances (up to 20 metres or 66 feet) and regularly returning to their original location.

=== Habitat ===
Guyandotte River crayfish are found in one stream system in Wyoming County, West Virginia, which is composed of 6 main streams. The crayfish require clean, large, permanent streams. They prefer fast-moving areas with small pools with gravel or cobble substrates. As a result, excessive sediment and pollutants will have a negative effect on their success.

=== Range ===
The Guyandotte River crayfish has a very limited range. There are only two known populations, and they are both found within the same stream system in Wyoming County. One population occupies the Pinnacle Creek stream, and the second population occupies the Clear Fork stream. These populations are limited to their respective streams and isolated from one another.

== Conservation ==
=== Population size ===
No historic or current population estimates or surveys exist to provide a full understand of how many individuals exist.

=== Geographical distribution ===
Major conservation issues for the Guyandotte River crayfish exist due to loss of habitat and habitat degradation. Current estimates suggest that the species occupies only 8% of its historic habitat. While it was once occupying nine streams in West Virginia, it has recently only been observed in two.

=== Major threats ===
Major threats to the habitat include degradation and fragmentation. Guyandotte River crayfish live in the benthic habitat in fast moving streams. Commercial logging, coal mining, and general human population growth and development has increased sedimentation which has reduced habitat availability. As a result, Guyandotte River crayfish are being outcompeted by generalist crayfish species. In addition, infilling and sedimentation of streams are leading to habitat fragmentation, resulting in populations being cut off from each other. With such a small native range, any habitat destruction has detrimental effects for this species.

=== Listing under the Endangered Species Act ===
The Guyandotte River crayfish was listed as Endangered wherever found under the Endangered Species Act (ESA) on April 7, 2016.

=== 5-year review ===
The 5-year review for the Guyandotte River crayfish was initiated on October 13, 2020, and has not yet been published.

=== Species status assessment ===
A species status assessment has not been developed for the Guyandotte River crayfish at this point.

=== Recovery plan ===
The joint recovery plan for the Guyandotte River crayfish and the Big Sandy crayfish was initiated in 2018, with expectations of a completed draft before the end of the 2021 fiscal year.

Major goals stated in the 2018 Recovery Outline include:

- Research and monitoring: Conduct research in order to gain a better understanding of the life history, habitat requirements, and threats of the Guyandotte River Crayfish. Existing gaps in Guyandotte River Crayfish research include its interactions with other species, specific habitat preferences, and sensitivity to pollutants.
- Habitat protection: Maintaining the "integrity and quality of streams within watersheds" supporting the Guyandotte River Crayfish is one main goal outlined in thee recovery document. Additionally, the protection and restoration of the larger streams within the system that supports the species, and the protection of the riparian forests within crayfish watersheds are included in the Guyandotte River Crayfish recovery plan. The 2018 Recovery Outline also emphasizes the importance of reducing the potential for pollutant contamination, including spills. The development of a "spill response plan" is listed as a goal in the document. Another goal established by the Recovery Outline is the restoration of "habitats within watersheds that historically supported populations" with the objective of reestablishing populations in those habitats.
- Establishing connectivity: In order to increase redundancy of the Guyandotte River Crayfish, the 2018 Recovery Outline calls for the establishment of connectivity between the known populations at Clear Fork and Pinnacle Creek.
- Communication, outreach, and education: In order to increase understanding of and participation in Guyandotte River Crayfish conservation efforts, the 2018 Recovery Outline proposes the development of educational programming for the public and private sectors on the importance of crayfish and other rare species. Additionally, informational signs and kiosks are to be placed "near streams important to crayfish recovery" to increase local awareness

Current actions to conserve Guyandotte River crayfish populations include critical habitat designation. On March 15, 2022, the Fish and Wildlife Service released a document which designates several streams in the Guyandotte River as critical habitat for the Guyandotte River crayfish. These streams include occupied habitat (Pinnacle Creek and Clear Fork) as well as viable potential habitat (Indian Creek and Huff Creek).
