= Windom =

Windom may refer to:

== Places ==
United States

- Windom, Kansas
- Windom, Minnesota
- Windom, Minneapolis, Minnesota
- Windom Park, Minneapolis, Minnesota
- Windom Township, Minnesota
- Windom, Missouri
- Windom, North Carolina
- Windom, New York
- Windom, Oklahoma
- Windom, Pennsylvania
- Windom, South Dakota
- Windom, Texas
- Windom, West Virginia
- Windom Peak in Colorado

== People with the surname ==
- Steve Windom (born 1949), American politician
- William Windom (politician) (born 1827–1891), American politician
- William Windom (actor) (born 1923–2012), American actor

== Other uses ==
- Toyota Windom, Japan-market Toyota sedan
- USRC Windom, revenue cutter
