= Edith, West Virginia =

Community in West Virginia, US

Edith
- Unincorporated community
- Location within the state of West Virginia Edith (the United States)
- Coordinates: 37°40′36″N 81°36′26″W
- Country: United States
- State: West Virginia
- County: Wyoming
- Elevation: 1,345 ft (410 m)
- Time zone: UTC-5 (Eastern (EST))
  - Summer (DST): UTC-4 (EDT)
- GNIS ID: 1554373

Edith is an unincorporated community in Wyoming County, West Virginia, United States, situated along the Laurel Fork.
