= Glen Rogers =

Glenn or Glen Rogers may refer to:

- Glenn Rogers (politician) (born 1956), American member of Texas House of Representatives
- Glen Edward Rogers (1962–2025), American executed serial killer
- Glenn Rogers (musician) (born 1966), American guitarist with Hirax, Deliverance, Vengeance Rising and Once Dead
- Glenn Rogers (gridiron football) (born 1969), American defensive back in CFL and NFL
- Glenn Rogers (cricketer) (born 1977), Australian-born Scottish left-arm bowler

== See also ==
- Glen Rogers, West Virginia, American unincorporated community
