= Milam, West Virginia =

Milam may refer to:

- Milam, Hardy County, West Virginia, a community in Hardy County, West Virginia
- Milam, Wyoming County, West Virginia, a community in Wyoming County, West Virginia
