= Pineville High School =

Pineville High School can refer to more than one educational institution in the United States:

- Pineville High School (Kentucky) in Pineville, Kentucky
- Pineville High School (Louisiana) in Pineville, Louisiana
- Pineville High School (West Virginia) in Pineville, West Virginia
