= Glen Rogers High School =

Defunct school in West Virginia, United States

- Glen Rogers, Wyoming County, West Virginia; United States

Information
- Established: 1928
- Closed: 1992
- Colors: Green and White
- Mascot: Owl

Glen Rogers High School was a high school in Glen Rogers, Wyoming County, West Virginia. It opened in 1928 and was closed in 1992 and consolidated into nearby Pineville High School and Oceana High School.

== History ==
Glen Rogers High School offered its first classes in 1928. Feeder schools for Glen Rogers High School included Glen Fork Elementary School, Glen Rogers Elementary School, and John McGraw Elementary School. In 1929, Glen Rogers High School held its first graduation with two students, Kelly Barrett and Elizabeth Williams. In 1938, it had a senior class of eight students.

Glen Rogers High School alma mater: "Glen Rogers High, Glen Rogers High, we love our high school, raise our banners high. We love our name, fight for our fame, victory forever is our aim".

A new building was built in 1951 for $172,750.

Glen Rogers High School held its last graduation in 1992. The school was closed and consolidated when enrollment in grades 9 to 12 dropped under 200 students. In 2013, the former school building was demolished due to arson and ongoing vandalism.

== Student activities ==
Glen Rogers High School offered many clubs and groups for its students. Some of these were the Science Club, National Honor Society, Chorus, Future Business Leaders of America, Christian Youth Group, Quiz Bowl Team, Chess Club, and the Varsity Club. The first school yearbook, The Owl, was published in 1938.

== Athletics ==
Glen Rogers High School's mascot was the "Owl" with its sporting teams called the "Owls". The school colors were green and white. Over the years, the school offered various sports, including boys' and girls' basketball, softball, football, baseball, cross country, cheerleading, and golf.

Glen Rogers High School varsity boys basketball team won the West Virginia Class “A” State Championship in 1977, defeating the then number one ranked Gauley Bridge Travellers, 69-65.

== Notable alumni ==
- William C. Marland ('35), Governor of West Virginia 1953-1957
