= Barkers Creek =

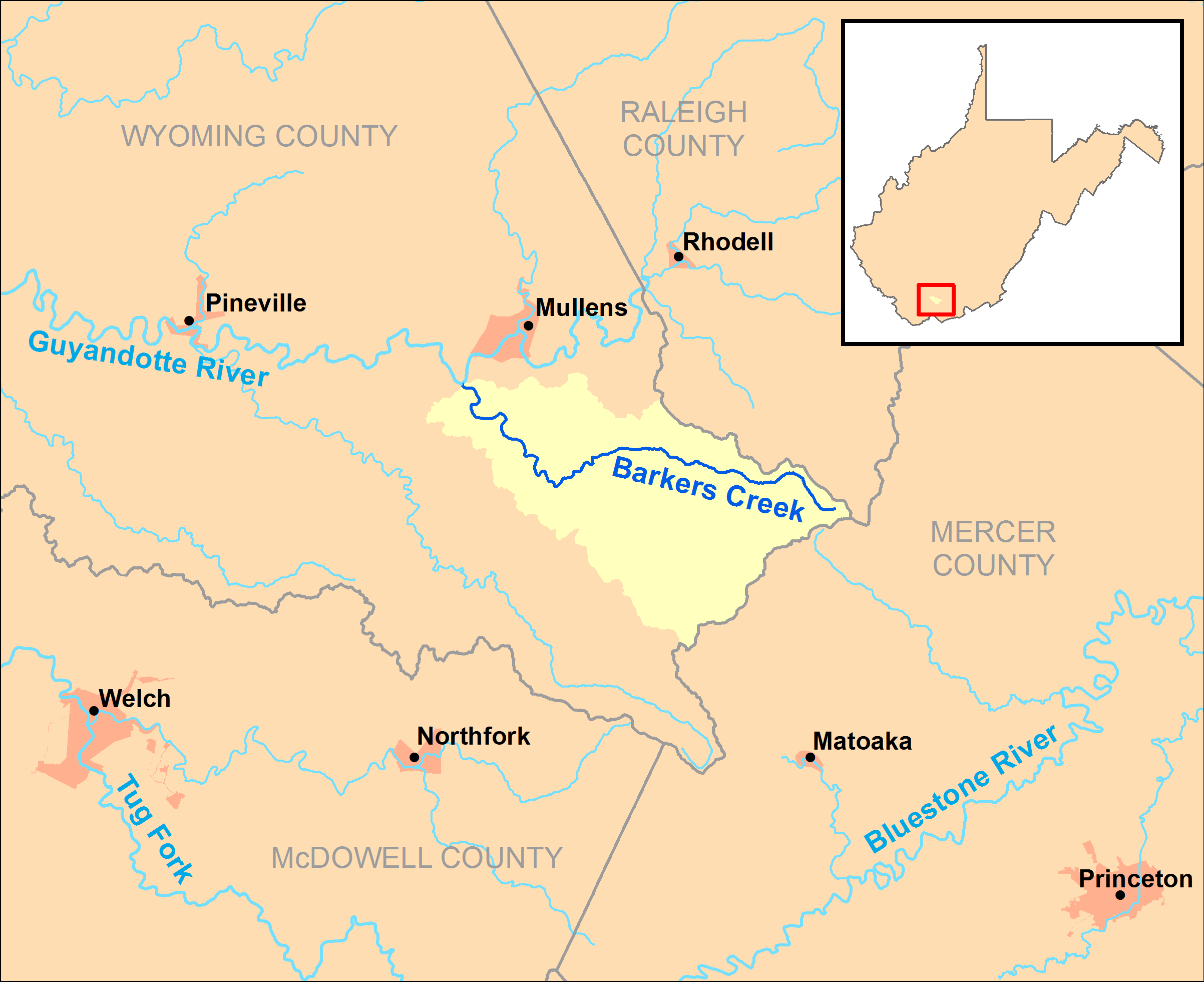
- Barkers Creek and its watershed in Wyoming County, West Virginia.

Location
- Country: United States
- State: West Virginia
- County: Wyoming

Physical characteristics
- Source
  - location: eastern Wyoming County
  - coordinates: 37.5145603°N 81.2278771°W
  - elevation: 3,477 ft (1,060 m)
- Mouth: Guyandotte River
  - location: northwest of Tralee
  - coordinates: 37.5612252°N 81.4084362°W
  - elevation: 1,381 ft (421 m)
- Length: 8.0 mi (12.9 km)
- Basin size: 36.85 sq mi (95.4 km^{2})

Barkers Creek is a tributary of the Guyandotte River, 8 miles (13 km) long, in southern West Virginia in the United States. Via the Guyandotte and Ohio rivers, it is part of the watershed of the Mississippi River, draining an area of 36.85 square miles (95.4 km^{2}) in a rural area on the unglaciated portion of the Allegheny Plateau.

Barkers Creek's entire course and drainage area are in southeastern Wyoming County. It rises in the eastern extremity of Wyoming County, near the common boundary of Wyoming, Raleigh, and Mercer counties, approximately 3 miles (4.8 km) northeast of Arista, and flows initially westward, then turns northwestward through the unincorporated communities of Bud, Alpoca, and Tralee. It flows into the Guyandotte River from the south, approximately 0.5 miles (0.80 km) northwest of Tralee and 1 mile (1.6 km) southeast of Itmann. In its lower course the creek is paralleled by West Virginia Route 10.

According to 1992 data from the United States Geological Survey, approximately 94% of the Barkers Creek watershed was forested; approximately 2% was used for agriculture; and approximately 2% was used for commercial or mining purposes.

== See also ==
- List of rivers of West Virginia
