= Indian Creek (Guyandotte River tributary) =

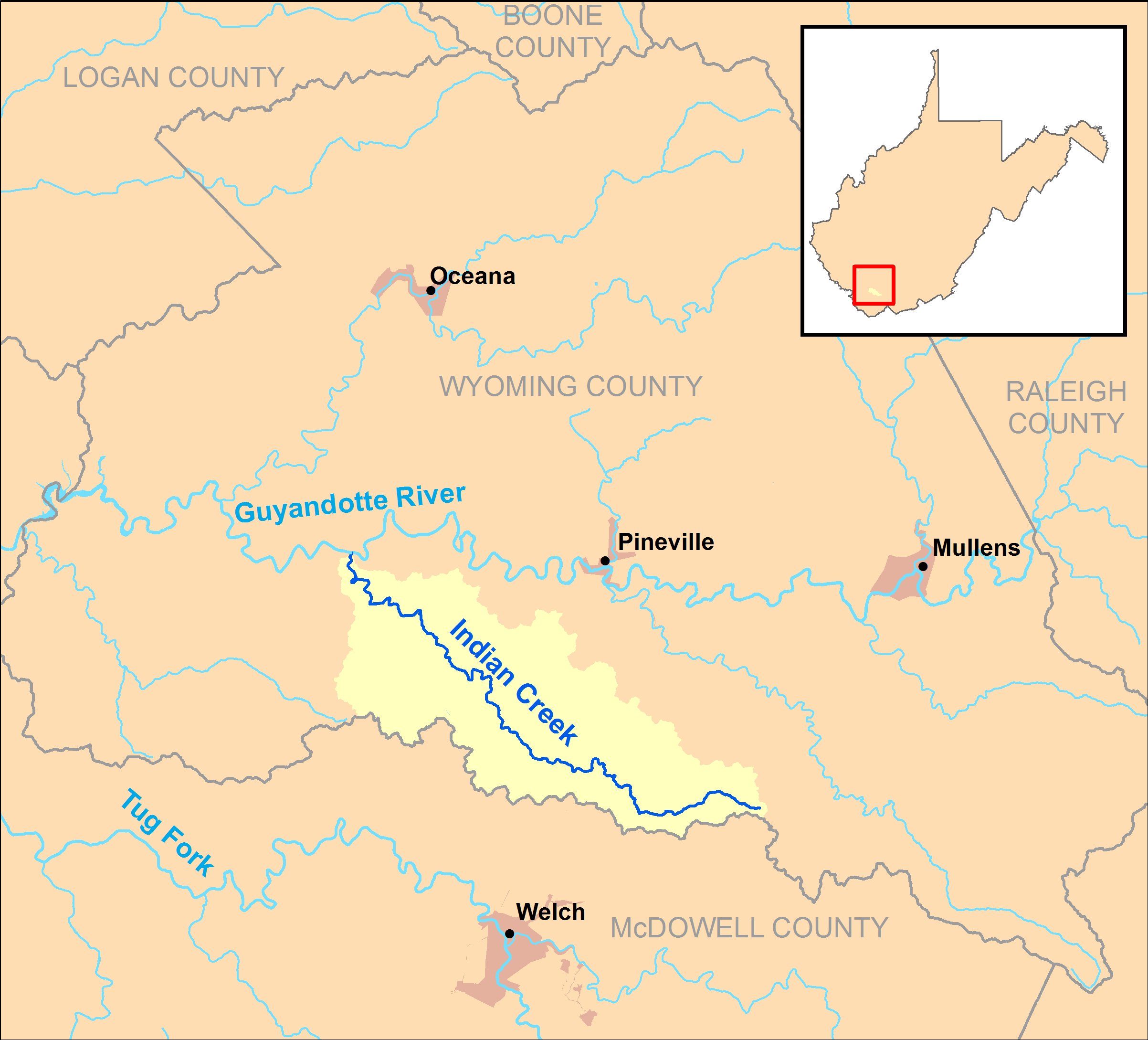
- Indian Creek and its watershed in Wyoming County, West Virginia

Location
- Country: United States
- State: West Virginia
- County: Wyoming

Physical characteristics
- Source
  - location: southeastern Wyoming County
  - coordinates: 37.4831698°N 81.4584366°W
  - elevation: 2,315 ft (706 m)
- Mouth: Guyandotte River
  - location: east of Baileysville
  - coordinates: 37.5870558°N 81.6648324°W
  - elevation: 1,132 ft (345 m)
- Length: 19.7 mi (31.7 km)
- Basin size: 43 sq mi (110 km^{2})

Indian Creek is a tributary of the Guyandotte River, 19.7 miles (31.7 km) long, in southern West Virginia in the United States. Via the Guyandotte and Ohio rivers, it is part of the watershed of the Mississippi River, draining an area of 43 square miles (110 km^{2}) in a rural area on the unglaciated portion of the Allegheny Plateau.

Indian Creek's entire course and drainage area are in southern Wyoming County. It rises in southeastern Wyoming County, approximately 5 miles (8.0 km) south of New Richmond, and flows generally northwestward, through the unincorporated communities of Wolf Pen, Fanny, and Fanrock. It flows into the Guyandotte River from the south, approximately 0.3 miles (0.48 km) east of Baileysville. A section of the creek's middle course is paralleled by West Virginia Route 16.

According to the West Virginia Department of Environmental Protection, approximately 97.7% of the Indian Creek watershed is forested, mostly deciduous.

== See also ==
- List of rivers of West Virginia
