= Nuriva, West Virginia =

Community in West Virginia, US

Nuriva
- Unincorporated community
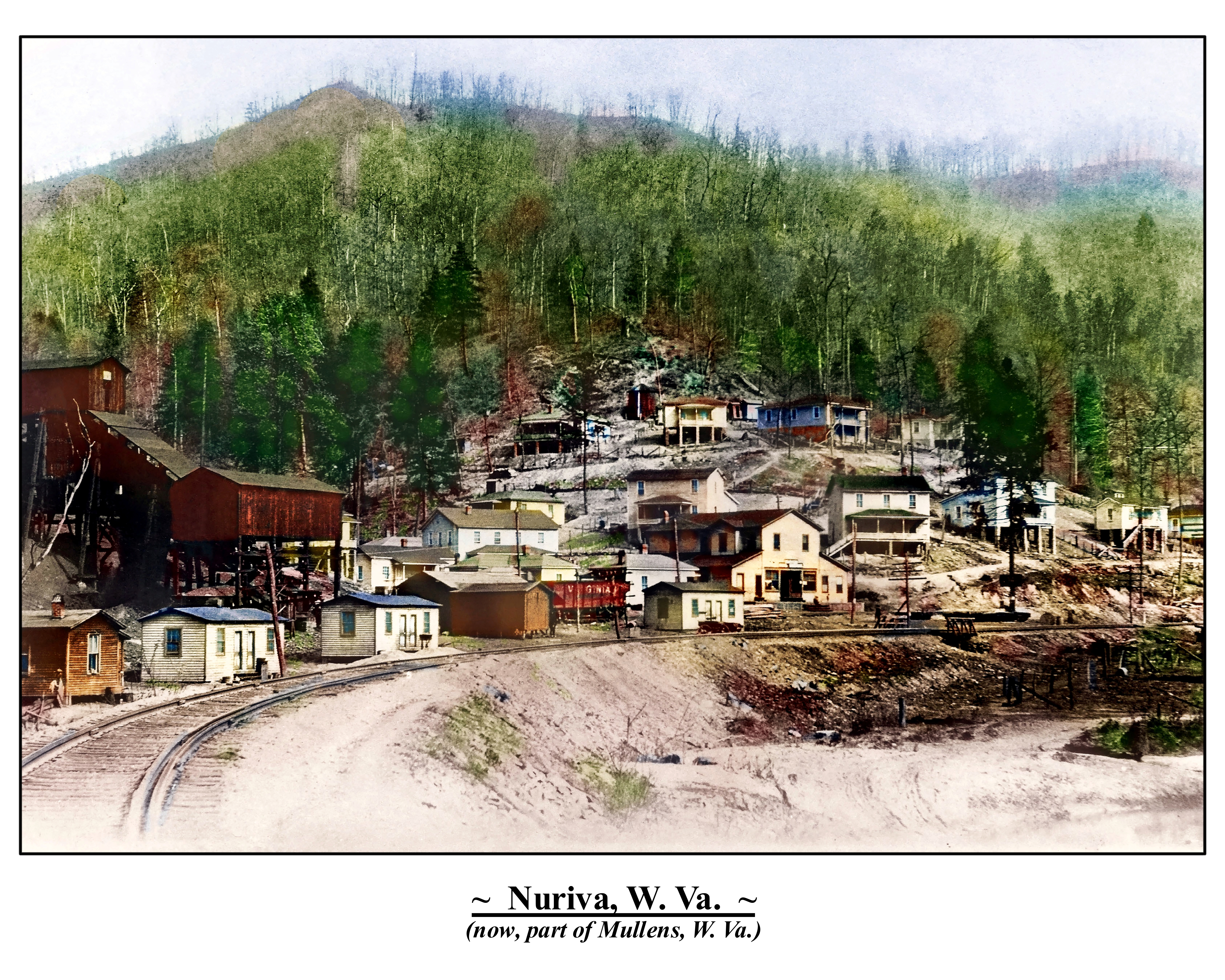
- Nuriva, West Virginia

- Location within the state of West Virginia Nuriva (the United States)
- Coordinates: 37°35′51″N 81°22′53″W
- Country: United States
- State: West Virginia
- County: Wyoming
- Elevation: 1,489 ft (454 m)
- Time zone: UTC-5 (Eastern (EST))
  - Summer (DST): UTC-4 (EDT)
- GNIS feature ID: 1555247

Nuriva is an unincorporated community in Wyoming County, West Virginia, United States. It was also known as Trace Fork and Tracoal. Its post office is closed.

The community's name is said to be derived from an unidentified Native American language.
