= Matheney =

Matheney is a surname. Notable people with the surname include:

- Alan Matheney (1950–2005), American criminal
- Buster Matheney (1956–2000), American basketball player
- Mary Brigid Matheney (born 1974), American politician

== See also ==
- Matheny (surname)
