= Devils Fork, West Virginia =

Community in West Virginia, US

Coordinates: 37°34′49″N 81°19′34″W

Devils Fork
- Unincorporated community
- Interactive map of Devils Fork
- Country: United States
- State: West Virginia
- County: Wyoming
- Time zone: Eastern (EST)
- FIPS code: 1555708

Devils Fork was an unincorporated community located in Wyoming and Raleigh counties, West Virginia, United States.

Part of the community was renamed Stephenson. The area's coal mines and a portion of its community (see Mine Map 322942) resided in the vicinity of Amigo in Raleigh County.
