= Laurel Fork (Clear Fork Guyandotte River tributary) =

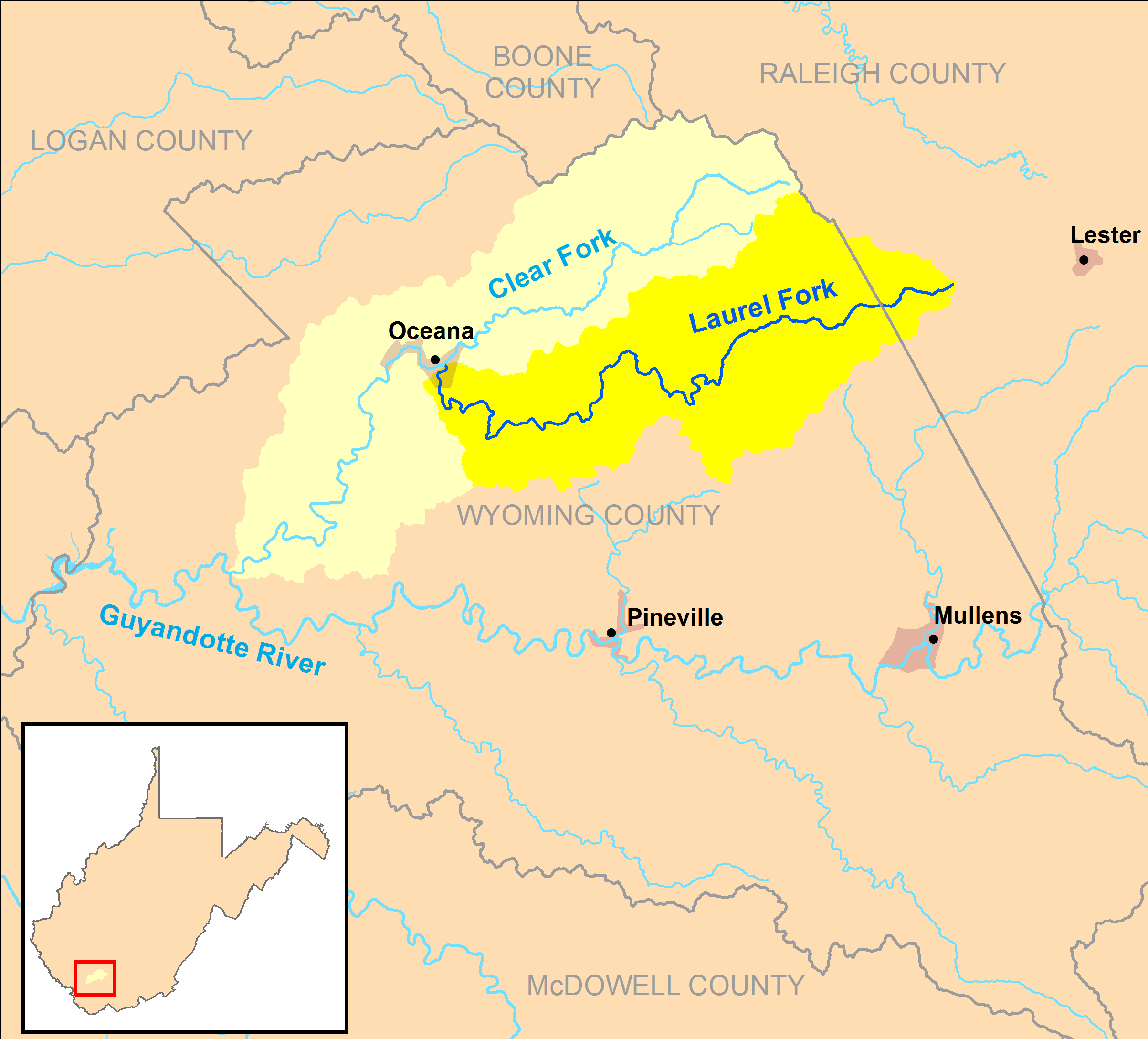
- The Laurel Fork and its watershed, highlighted within the larger Clear Fork watershed, in Wyoming and Raleigh counties, West Virginia.

Location
- Country: United States
- State: West Virginia
- Counties: Raleigh, Wyoming

Physical characteristics
- Source
  - location: west of Lester
  - coordinates: 37.725669°N 81.3662145°W
  - elevation: 2,554 ft (778 m)
- Mouth: Clear Fork
  - location: Oceana
  - coordinates: 37.6912220°N 81.6237207°W
  - elevation: 1,260 ft (380 m)
- Length: 23.5 mi (37.8 km)
- Basin size: 56.4 sq mi (146 km^{2})

The Laurel Fork is a tributary of the Clear Fork, 23.5 miles (37.8 km) long, in southern West Virginia in the United States. Via the Clear Fork and the Guyandotte and Ohio rivers, it is part of the watershed of the Mississippi River, draining an area of 56.4 square miles (146 km^{2}) in a rural area on the unglaciated portion of the Allegheny Plateau.

The Laurel Fork rises in western Raleigh County, approximately 4 miles (6.4 km) west of Lester, and flows generally westward through northern Wyoming County, through the unincorporated communities of Glen Rogers, Ravencliff, Sabine, Glen Fork, Jesse, Matheny, and Edith, to the town of Oceana, where it flows into the Clear Fork from the east. Downstream of Jesse, the stream is paralleled by West Virginia Route 10.

== See also ==
- List of rivers of West Virginia
