= Glover, West Virginia =

Community in West Virginia, US

Glover
- Unincorporated community
- Location within the state of West Virginia Glover (the United States)
- Coordinates: 37°35′12″N 81°35′24″W
- Country: United States
- State: West Virginia
- County: Wyoming
- Elevation: 1,217 ft (371 m)
- Time zone: UTC-5 (Eastern (EST))
  - Summer (DST): UTC-4 (EDT)
- GNIS feature ID: 1554576

Glover is an unincorporated community and coal town in Wyoming County, West Virginia, United States.
