= Alpoca, West Virginia =

Community in West Virginia, US

Alpoca
- Unincorporated community
- Location within the state of West Virginia Alpoca (the United States)
- Coordinates: 37°32′32″N 81°23′21″W
- Country: United States
- State: West Virginia
- County: Wyoming
- Time zone: UTC-5 (Eastern (EST))
  - Summer (DST): UTC-4 (EDT)
- GNIS feature ID: 1553718

Alpoca is an unincorporated community in Wyoming County, West Virginia, United States, along Barkers Creek and West Virginia Route 10. The Alpoca Post Office has been closed.

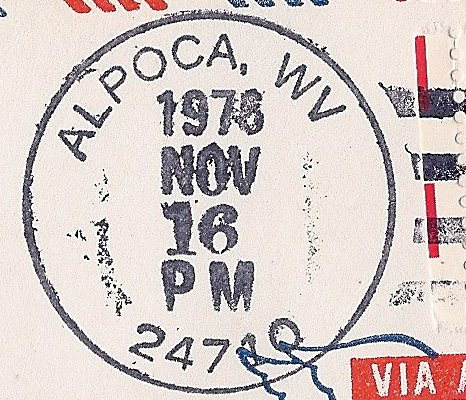
1976 Alpoca, postmark with the now retired 24710 ZIP Code
