= Terry Echols =

American football player (born 1962)

No. 94
- Position: Linebacker

Personal information
- Born: January 10, 1962 (age 64); Mullens, West Virginia
- Listed height: 6 ft 0 in (1.83 m)
- Listed weight: 220 lb (100 kg)

Career information
- High school: Mullens (WV)
- College: Marshall

Career history
- Pittsburgh Steelers (1984)
- Stats at Pro Football Reference

Terry Lee Echols (born January 10, 1962) is an American former football linebacker. He played in four games for the Pittsburgh Steelers in 1984.
