= Garwood, West Virginia =

Community in West Virginia, US

Garwood
- Unincorporated community
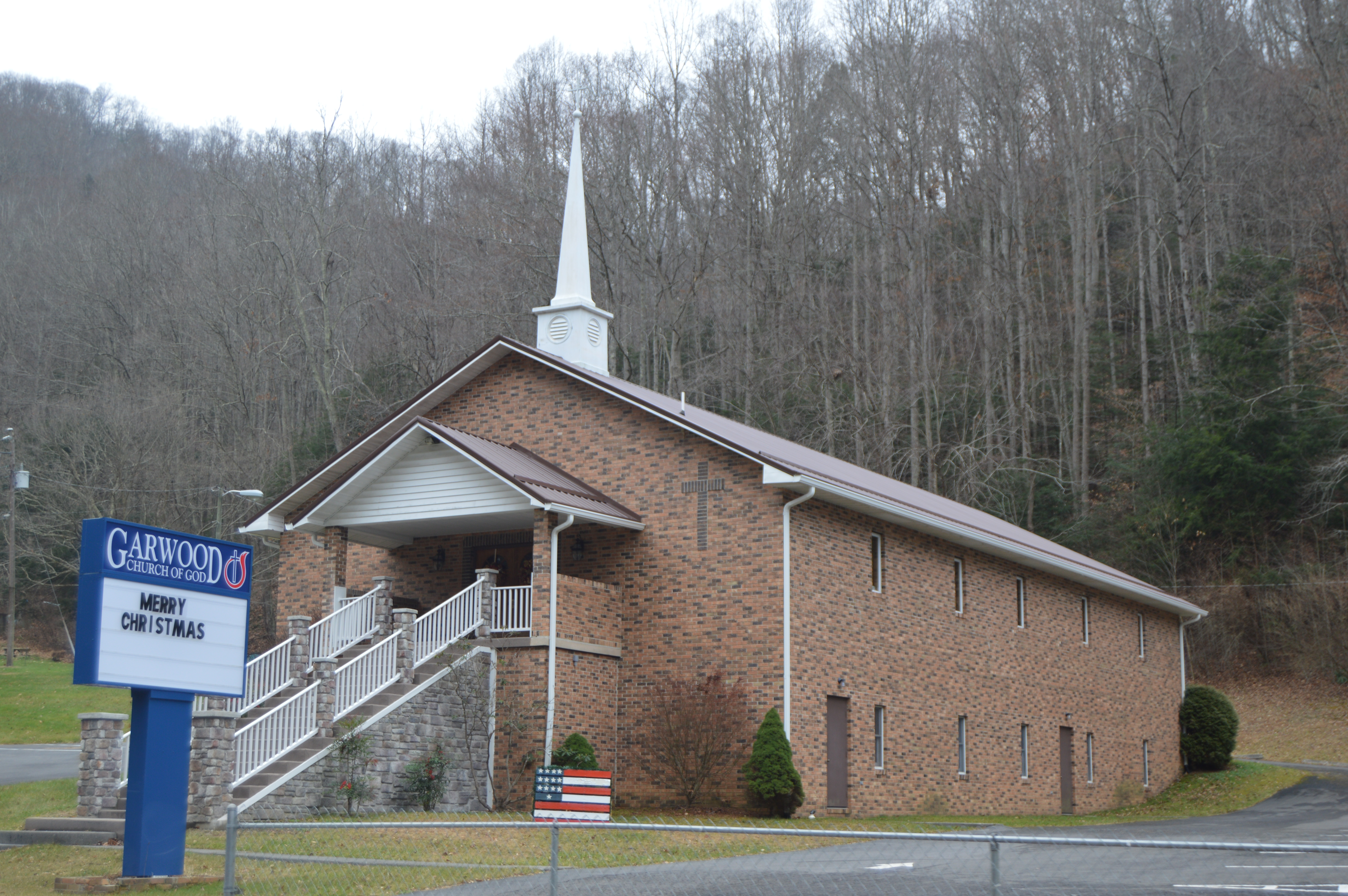
- Church of God on West Virginia Route 10

- Location within the state of West Virginia Garwood (the United States)
- Coordinates: 37°28′59″N 81°19′21″W
- Country: United States
- State: West Virginia
- County: Wyoming
- Time zone: UTC-5 (Eastern (EST))
  - Summer (DST): UTC-4 (EDT)
- GNIS feature ID: 1554535

Garwood is an unincorporated community in Wyoming County, West Virginia, United States.
