= Fanny, West Virginia =

Community in West Virginia, US

Fanny
- Unincorporated community
- Location within the state of West Virginia Fanny (the United States)
- Coordinates: 37°33′50″N 81°37′45″W
- Country: United States
- State: West Virginia
- County: Wyoming
- Time zone: UTC-5 (Eastern (EST))
  - Summer (DST): UTC-4 (EDT)
- GNIS feature ID: 1554443

Fanny is an unincorporated community in Wyoming County, West Virginia, United States, along Indian Creek.

A post office called Fanny was established in 1907, and remained in operation until it was discontinued in 1920.
