= Sabine, West Virginia =

Community in West Virginia, US

Sabine
- Unincorporated community
- Location within the state of West Virginia Sabine (the United States)
- Coordinates: 37°40′50″N 81°30′11″W
- Country: United States
- State: West Virginia
- County: Wyoming
- Time zone: UTC-5 (Eastern (EST))
  - Summer (DST): UTC-4 (EDT)
- ZIP codes: 25916
- GNIS feature ID: 1555549

Sabine is an unincorporated community in Wyoming County, West Virginia, United States, along the Laurel Fork.
