= Allen Junction, West Virginia =

Community in West Virginia, US

Allen Junction
- Unincorporated community
- Formerly called Welton
- Nickname: The Junction
- Location within the state of West Virginia Allen Junction (the United States)
- Coordinates: 37°35′21″N 81°21′2″W
- Country: United States
- State: West Virginia
- County: Wyoming
- Time zone: UTC-5 (Eastern (EST))
  - Summer (DST): UTC-4 (EDT)
- ZIP code: 25810
- Area code: 304
- GNIS feature ID: 1553709

Allen Junction is an unincorporated community in Wyoming County, West Virginia, United States. Their post office is still open.
