= Rock View, West Virginia =

Community in West Virginia, US

Rock View
- Unincorporated community
- Location within the state of West Virginia Rock View (the United States)
- Coordinates: 37°37′4″N 81°32′21″W
- Country: United States
- State: West Virginia
- County: Wyoming
- Time zone: UTC-5 (Eastern (EST))
  - Summer (DST): UTC-4 (EDT)
- ZIP code: 24880
- Area codes: 304 and 681
- GNIS feature ID: 1555503

Rock View is an unincorporated community in Wyoming County, West Virginia, United States.

The community takes its name from a nearby rock formation, Castle Rock.

== Climate ==
The climate in this area is characterized by hot, humid summers and generally mild to cool winters. According to the Köppen Climate Classification system, Rock View has a humid subtropical climate, abbreviated "Cfa" on climate maps.
