= Wolf Pen, West Virginia =

Community in West Virginia, US

Wolf Pen
- Unincorporated community
- Location within the state of West Virginia Wolf Pen (the United States)
- Coordinates: 37°32′16″N 81°35′30″W
- Country: United States
- State: West Virginia
- County: Wyoming
- Time zone: UTC-5 (Eastern (EST))
  - Summer (DST): UTC-4 (EDT)
- ZIP codes: 24896
- GNIS feature ID: 1741519

Wolf Pen is an unincorporated community in Wyoming County, West Virginia, United States, along Indian Creek.

The community took its name from the wolf pen, a device used to trap wolves.
