= Key Rock, West Virginia =

Community in West Virginia, US

Key Rock
- Unincorporated community
- Location within the state of West Virginia Key Rock (the United States)
- Coordinates: 37°39′16″N 81°31′8″W
- Country: United States
- State: West Virginia
- County: Wyoming
- Time zone: UTC-5 (Eastern (EST))
  - Summer (DST): UTC-4 (EDT)
- GNIS feature ID: 1554869

Key Rock is an unincorporated community in Wyoming County, West Virginia, United States. The community is home to the Coon Fork Church congregation and the Lester Family Cemetery.

The community may derive its name from nearby Rockcastle Creek.
