= Marianna, West Virginia =

Community in West Virginia, US

Marianna
- Unincorporated community
- Location within the state of West Virginia Marianna (the United States)
- Coordinates: 37°36′2″N 81°36′40″W
- Country: United States
- State: West Virginia
- County: Wyoming
- Time zone: UTC-5 (Eastern (EST))
  - Summer (DST): UTC-4 (EDT)
- ZIP code: 24859
- GNIS feature ID: 1557996

Marianna is an unincorporated community in Wyoming County, West Virginia, United States.
