= Coal Mountain, West Virginia =

Community in West Virginia, US

Coal Mountain
- Unincorporated community
- Location within the state of West Virginia Coal Mountain (the United States)
- Coordinates: 37°40′11″N 81°43′43″W
- Country: United States
- State: West Virginia
- County: Wyoming
- Time zone: UTC-5 (Eastern (EST))
  - Summer (DST): UTC-4 (EDT)
- GNIS feature ID: 1537461

Coal Mountain is an unincorporated community in Wyoming County, West Virginia, United States. It has a population of 410. The Guyandotte River is nearby.

== Geography ==
Located within the Appalachian Mountains, Coal Mountain is known for its historical ties to the coal mining industry, which has shaped both its economy and cultural identity. The community's name reflects its location in a region rich with coal deposits.

The climate in Coal Mountain is classified as humid continental, typical of West Virginia. Summers are warm and humid, while winters are cold and often snowy, with the mountainous elevation potentially intensifying winter conditions.

== Notable people ==
- Rodney Hatfield Jr. (writer)
