= Bud, West Virginia =

Community in West Virginia, US

Bud
- Census-designated place (CDP)
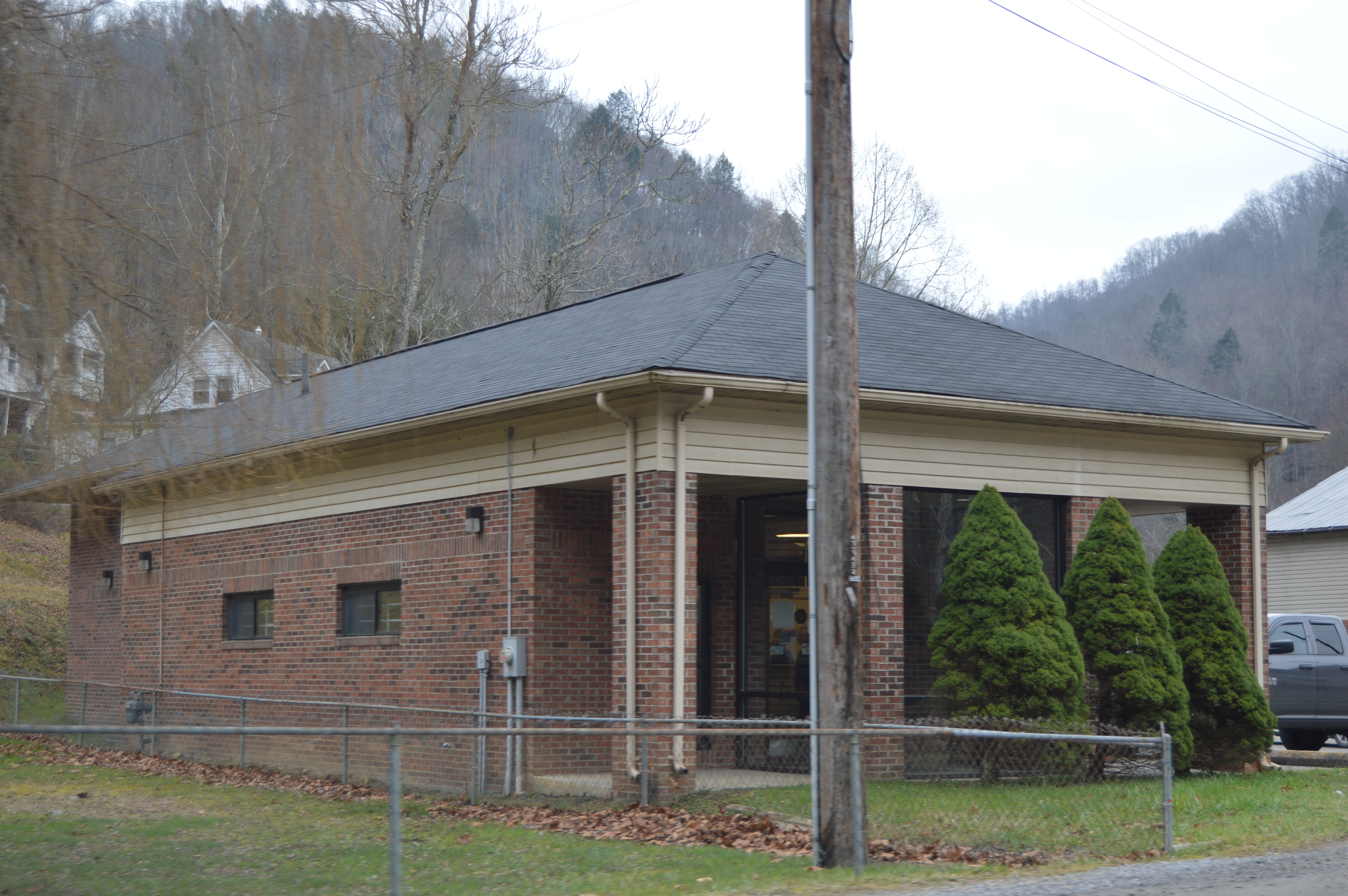
- Post office

- Location within the state of West Virginia
- Coordinates: 37°32′10″N 81°22′47″W
- Country: United States
- State: West Virginia
- County: Wyoming

Area
  - Total: 3.147 sq mi (8.15 km^{2})
  - Land: 3.122 sq mi (8.09 km^{2})
  - Water: 0.025 sq mi (0.065 km^{2})

Population (2020)
  - Total: 347
  - Density: 111/sq mi (42.9/km^{2})
- Time zone: UTC-5 (Eastern (EST))
  - Summer (DST): UTC-4 (EDT)
- ZIP codes: 24716

Bud is a census-designated place (CDP) in Wyoming County, West Virginia, United States, along Barkers Creek and West Virginia Route 10. As of the 2020 census, its population was 347 (down from 487 at the 2010 census).

The community has the name of Bud Adams, a businessperson in the local logging industry.
