= Wyoming East High School =

Location
- 260 Warrior Way; New Richmond, West Virginia 24867; United States; 37.5702014°N 81.4709111°W

Information
- School type: High School
- Established: 1998
- School district: Wyoming County Schools
- CEEB code: 491051
- Principal: Jordan McBride
- Teaching staff: 26.58 (on an FTE basis)
- Grades: 9–12
- Enrollment: 446 (2023–2024)
- Student to teacher ratio: 16.78
- Campus type: High School
- Colors: Forest green, black and silver
- Slogan: An army is greater than a warrior.
- Athletics: football, basketball-boys and girls, tennis, baseball, softball, volleyball, track and field, cross country, golf, cheerleading, and marching band.
- Athletics conference: Coalfield Conference - Class “AA”
- Mascot: Warrior
- Team name: Warriors/Lady Warriors
- Website: http://wehs.wyom.k12.wv.us/

Wyoming East High School is a consolidated regional high school in New Richmond, West Virginia serving the eastern half of Wyoming County, West Virginia. Opening ahead of the 1998–1999 Academic School Year, Wyoming East is a consolidation of former Pineville High School and Mullens High School. Also taking in the former Herndon High School (West Virginia) (who consolidated with Mullens High School), as well as roughly two-thirds of the attendance area of former Glen Rogers High School, which consolidated with Pineville High. Both Herndon High School and Glen Rogers High School, closed their doors following the 1991–1992 school term. It also celebrates the academic and athletic heritage of Conley High School, which was the county's segregated school and had closed following the 1963–1964 school term, consolidating into Mullens High School. As well as W. M. Ritter in Maben, Scott High in Glen Rogers, as well as Milam High School, which sat between John McGraw and Ravencliff, West Virginia.

Milam High School would later close in 1943, the kids would be sent to Glen Rogers High. W.M. Ritter would close its doors 12 years prior in 1931.

== Post-Consolidation State championships ==
Listed below are all championships won by Wyoming County East High School following the 1998 consolidation.

	State Championship(s)	State Runner-Ups
Sport	Year(s)	Year(s)
Boys Basketball	2002 (AA), 2007 (AA), 2008 (AA)	2009 (AA), 2010 (AA), 2026 (AA)
Girls Basketball	2016 (AA), 2021 (AA), 2023 (AA), 2024 (AA)	2018 (AA), 2019 (AA), 2022 (AA)
Baseball	2012 (AA)	2000, 2011 (AA)
Football	1999 (AA)
Golf	2016, 2017	1998, 1999, 2015
Golf Medalists	Evan Muscari - 2009, Brett Laxton, 2016	Ben Muscari - 2001, Evan Muscari - 2008
Archery	2002, 2003, 2014	2015
Tennis Singles	Kristy Lynn Perdue, 1999	Brittany Cook - 2003, Cassidy Smith - 2005
Track Individuals	Abi Baker, 2025 High Jump (A)
Theater & Thespian	2000, 2001, 2002, 2003, 2004, 2005, 2006, 2007, 2008, 2010, 2011, 2012, 2014, 2016,	2013
Marching Band		2018 (E)

== Notable alumni ==
- Heath Miller, professional wrestler
