= Covel, West Virginia =

Community in West Virginia, US

Covel
- Census-designated place (CDP)
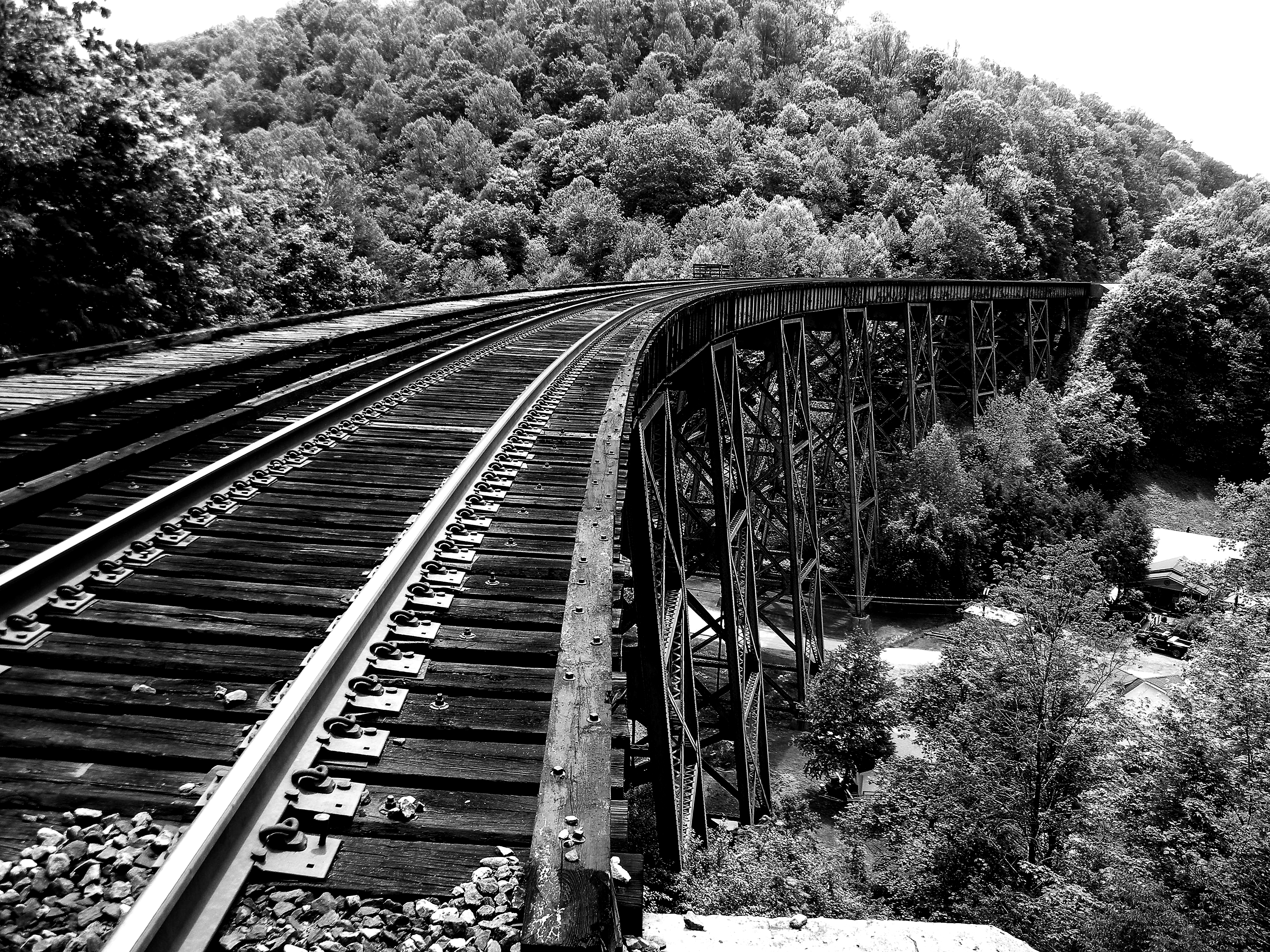
- Trestle at Covel West Virginia

- Location within West Virginia Location within the United States
- Coordinates: 37°29′19″N 81°19′24″W
- Country: United States
- State: West Virginia
- County: Wyoming

Area
  - Total: 0.212 sq mi (0.55 km^{2})
  - Land: 0.212 sq mi (0.55 km^{2})
  - Water: 0 sq mi (0 km^{2})

Population (2020)
  - Total: 85
  - Density: 400/sq mi (150/km^{2})
- Time zone: UTC-5 (Eastern (EST))
  - Summer (DST): UTC-4 (EDT)
- ZIP codes: 24719

Covel is a census-designated place (CDP) in Wyoming County, West Virginia, United States. As of the 2020 census, its population is 85 (down from 142 at the 2010 census).

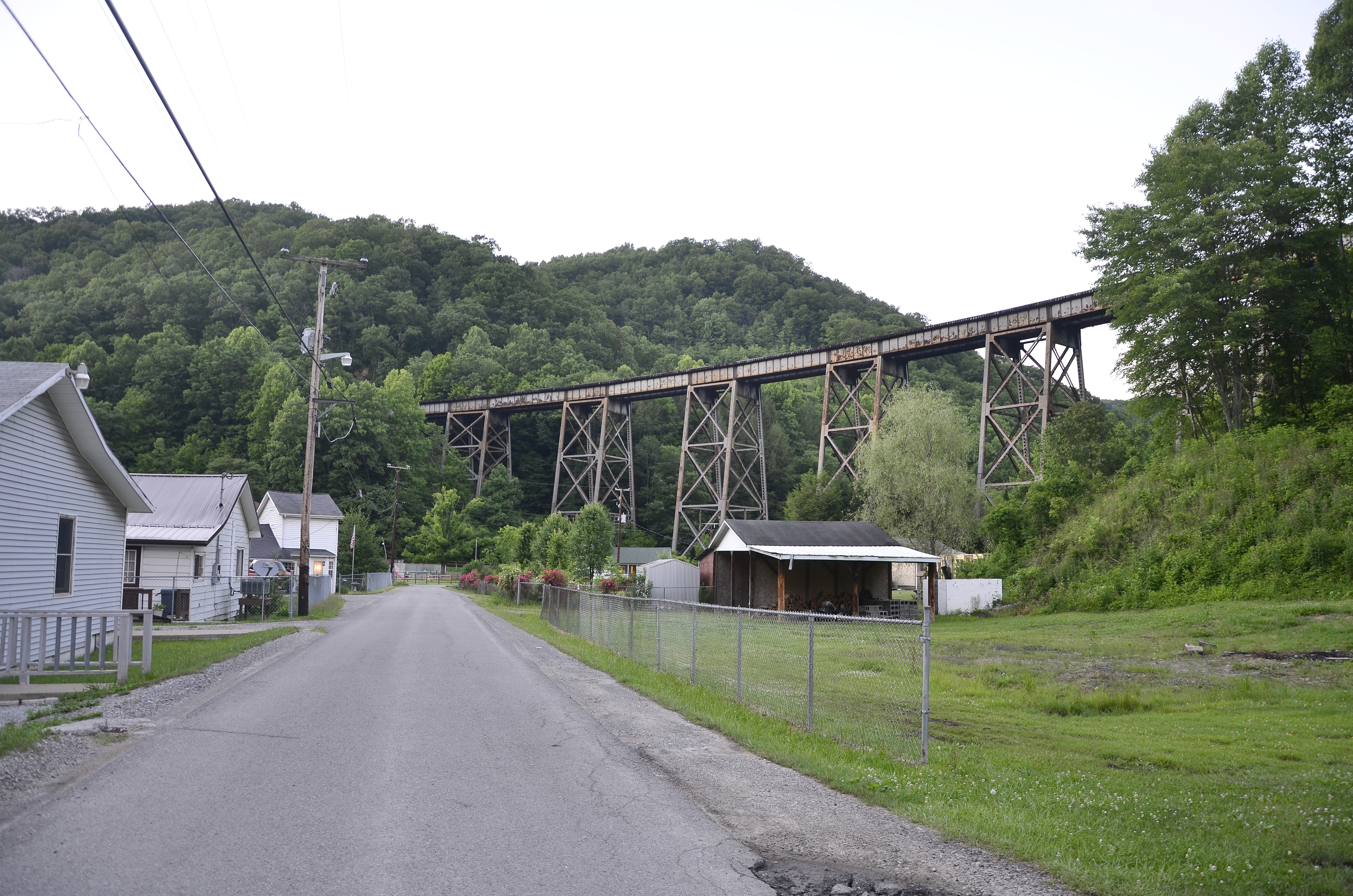
Covel in 2014
