= Jesse, West Virginia =

Community in West Virginia, US

Jesse
- Unincorporated community
- Location within the state of West Virginia Jesse (the United States)
- Coordinates: 37°40′5″N 81°34′23″W
- Country: United States
- State: West Virginia
- County: Wyoming
- Time zone: UTC-5 (Eastern (EST))
  - Summer (DST): UTC-4 (EDT)
- ZIP codes: 24849
- GNIS feature ID: 1540883

Jesse is an unincorporated community in Wyoming County, West Virginia, United States, along the Laurel Fork.

The community has the name of Jesse Shumate.
