= North Spring, West Virginia =

Community in West Virginia, US

North Spring
- Unincorporated community
- Location within the state of West Virginia North Spring (the United States)
- Coordinates: 37°34′05″N 81°49′31″W
- Country: United States
- State: West Virginia
- County: Wyoming
- Time zone: UTC-5 (Eastern (EST))
  - Summer (DST): UTC-4 (EDT)
- GNIS feature ID: 1555240

North Spring is an unincorporated community in Wyoming County, West Virginia, United States. It is located on Route 52/1 which is known as Little Cub Creek Road. It also is home to one of the oldest buildings in West Virginia, a one-room church that sits on the hill at the confluence of Trace Fork Creek and Little Cub Creek. It is also home to the oldest post office in the state, although it has been closed since the flood of 2009. In the 2010 Census, North Spring has a total of 339 residents.
