= Stephenson, West Virginia =

Community in West Virginia, US

Stephenson
- Unincorporated community
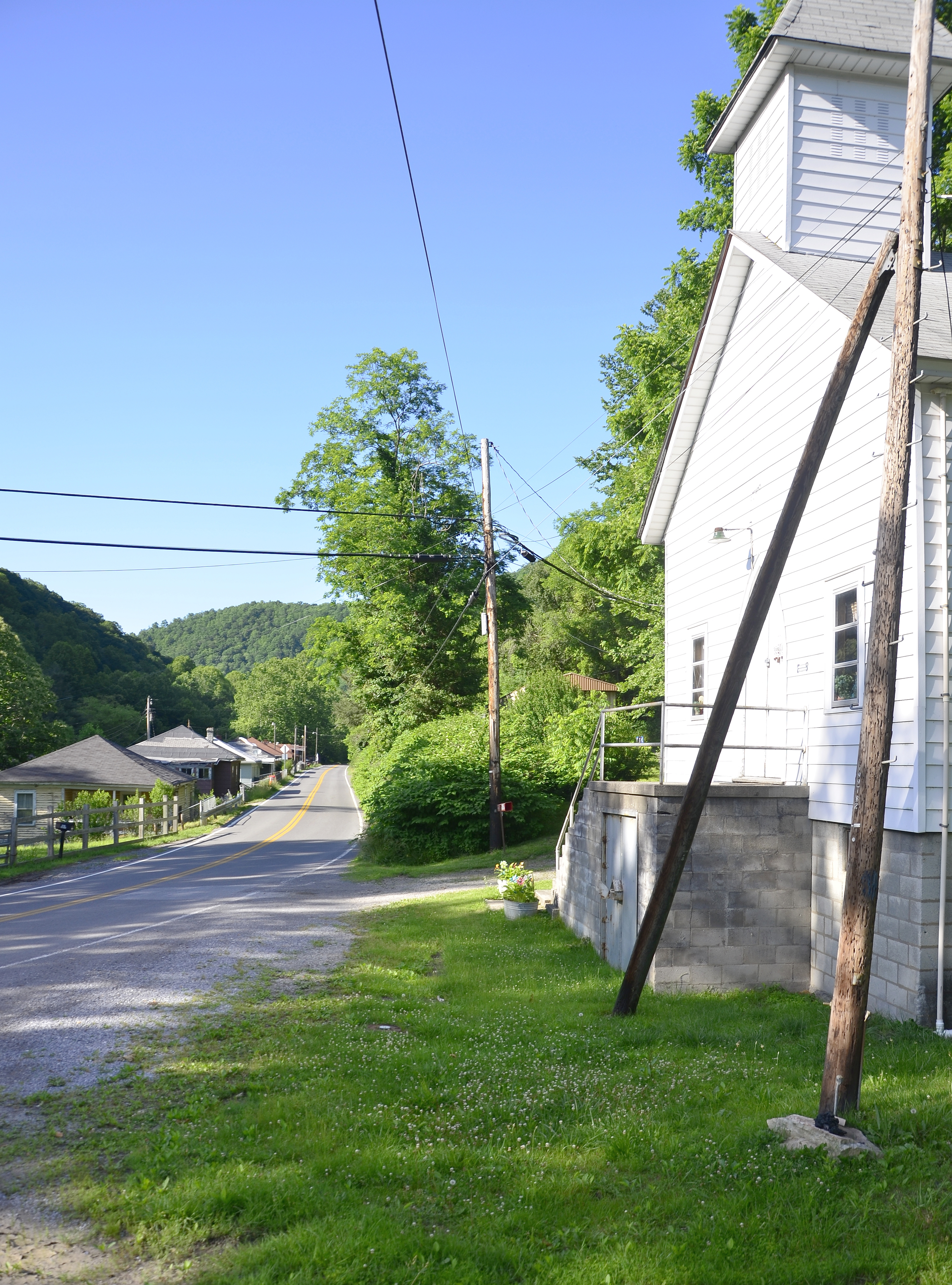
- Looking north on Route 16 in Stephenson

- Location within the state of West Virginia Stephenson (the United States)
- Coordinates: 37°34′49″N 81°19′35″W
- Country: United States
- State: West Virginia
- County: Wyoming
- Time zone: UTC-5 (Eastern (EST))
  - Summer (DST): UTC-4 (EDT)
- ZIP codes: 25928
- GNIS feature ID: 1555708

Stephenson is an unincorporated community in Wyoming County, West Virginia, United States. Part of the community was known as Devils Fork until 1935. The community was named after W. G. Stephenson, a mining official. Stephenson has a post office, with the ZIP code 25928.
