= Herndon, West Virginia =

Community in West Virginia, US

Herndon
- Unincorporated community
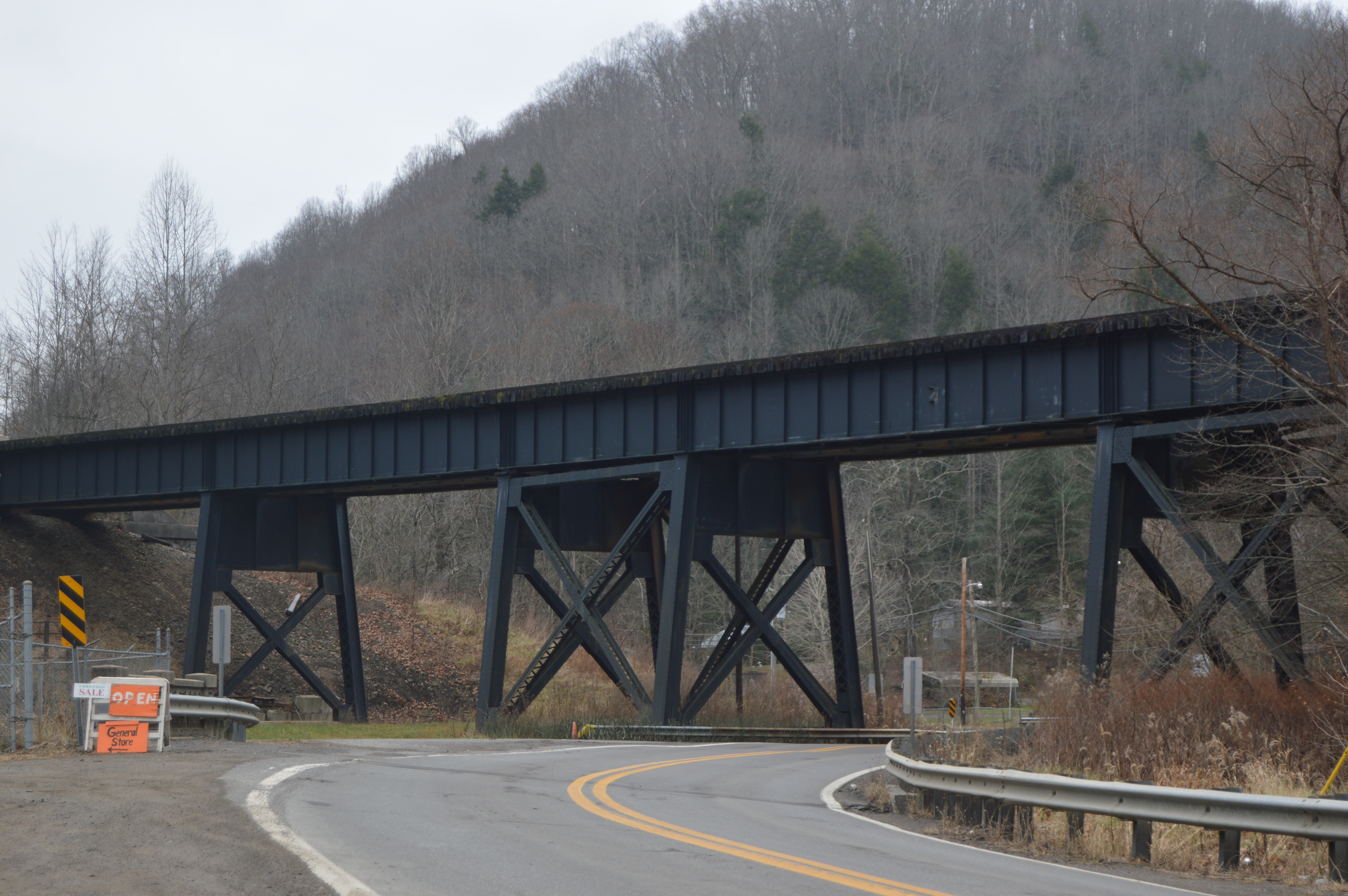
- Norfolk Southern bridge over West Virginia Route 10

- Location within the state of West Virginia Herndon (the United States)
- Coordinates: 37°30′19″N 81°20′26″W
- Country: United States
- State: West Virginia
- County: Wyoming

Government
  - Type: Democracy
- Time zone: UTC-5 (Eastern (EST))
  - Summer (DST): UTC-4 (EDT)
- ZIP codes: 24726
- GNIS feature ID: 1554688

Herndon is an unincorporated community in Wyoming County, West Virginia, United States. It has a population of 566 as of 2010.

Herndon is home to Herndon Consolidated Elementary and Middle School. A K-8 school of the Wyoming County Public Schools district with a student population of around 100. It is the only school and employer in the community.
