= Tralee, West Virginia =

Community in West Virginia, US

Tralee
- Unincorporated community
- Location within the state of West Virginia Tralee (the United States)
- Coordinates: 37°33′22″N 81°24′4″W
- Country: United States
- State: West Virginia
- County: Wyoming
- Time zone: UTC-5 (Eastern (EST))
  - Summer (DST): UTC-4 (EDT)

Tralee is an unincorporated community in Wyoming County, West Virginia, United States, along Barkers Creek and West Virginia Route 10.

The community's name may be a transfer from Tralee, Ireland.
