= Itmann, West Virginia =

Community in West Virginia, US

- Census-designated place (CDP)
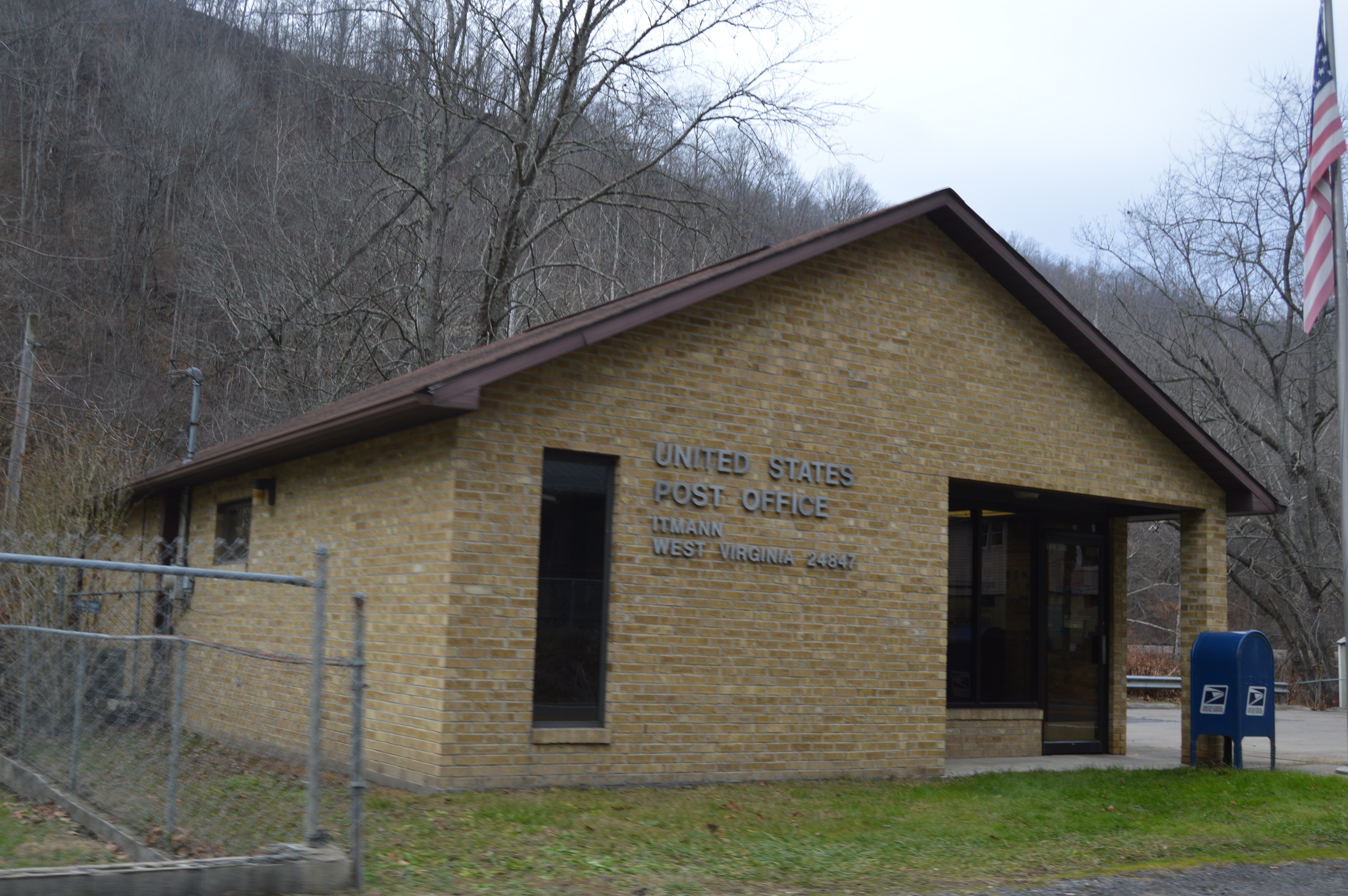
- Post office on WV 10
- Motto: Itmann: The Suburb of Mullens
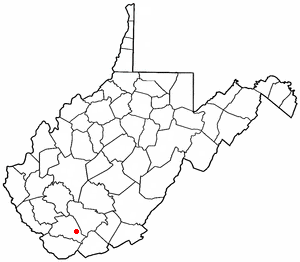
- Location of Itmann, West Virginia
- Coordinates: 37°34′23″N 81°25′5″W
- Country: United States
- State: West Virginia
- County: Wyoming

Area
  - Total: 1.007 sq mi (2.61 km^{2})
  - Land: 0.987 sq mi (2.56 km^{2})
  - Water: 0.020 sq mi (0.052 km^{2})
- Elevation: 1,388 ft (423 m)

Population (2020)
  - Total: 259
  - Density: 262/sq mi (101/km^{2})
- Time zone: UTC-5 (Eastern (EST))
  - Summer (DST): UTC-4 (EDT)
- ZIP code: 24847
- Area code: 304
- FIPS code: 54-57148
- GNIS feature ID: 1543986

Itmann is a census-designated place (CDP) and former mining town located in Wyoming County, West Virginia, United States, between Pineville and Mullens off West Virginia Route 16. As of the 2010 census, its population was 293; it had 138 homes, 119 of which were occupied. By the 2020 census, the population dropped to 259.

== History ==
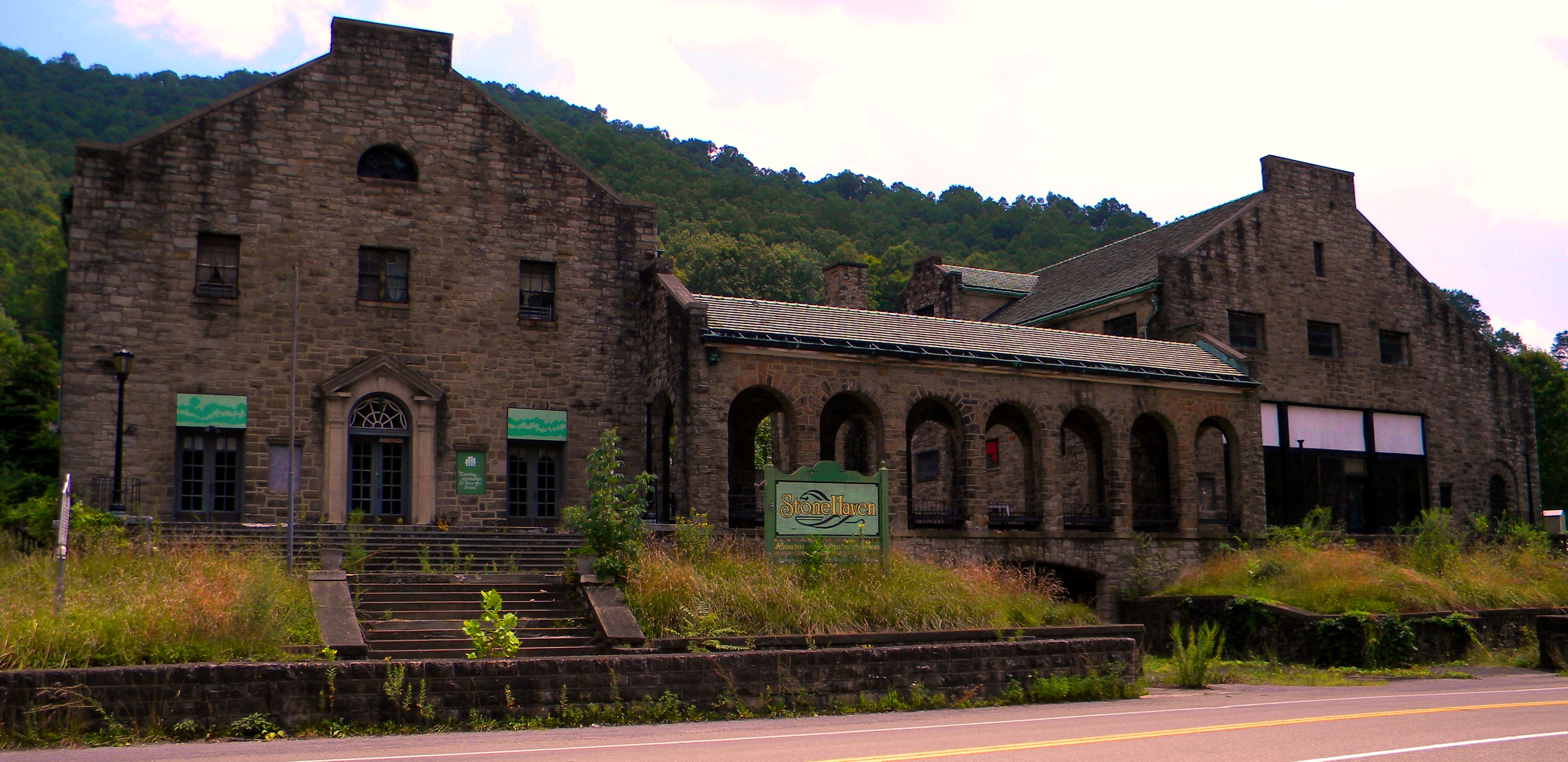
Itmann Company Store along West Virginia Route 16

In 1916, the Pocahontas Fuel Company constructed 120 dwellings near the mouth of Barkers Creek. The Itmann mine was opened in 1918 by the Pocahontas Fuel Co. (now CONSOL) It was named after the president of the company, Isaac T. Mann, or I. T. Mann which was eventually shortened down to Itmann. A single room school house was built in addition to the massive stone company store.

During the 1950s and 1960s it was the most productive mine in West Virginia. The coal seam Pocahontas No. 3 was one of the best to be found in the world, and the coal is rated at 15,000 Btu/lb (35 MJ/kg). By the 1980s, Island Creek Coal Co. was mining in Pocahontas No. 3 at Itmann, employing around 500 miners. A larger school was built shortly after and the single room school house was converted into the UMWA hall. During his campaign, John F. Kennedy entered one of the three Itmann mines while visiting then-booming neighboring city, Mullens.

=== 1972 Explosion ===
There was a large methane explosion on December 16, 1972 in the Itmann Mine #3. The explosion killed five miners and left three others injured. The mines at Itmann have been recorded to have produced 26,065,526 tons of coal.

=== Current ===
Itmann has a post office, a church, the Council on Aging, and a welding shop. The former school is home to the offices of the Council on Aging. The single room school that was converted into the UMWA hall is currently unused. The Itmann Company Store and Office is still standing and is a registered historical landmark in West Virginia and was listed on the National Register of Historic Places in 1990. Half of the company store was used as a homeless shelter while the other half was unused. Now it is empty. The welding shop is still operational and fabricates escalators for local mines.

== Popular culture ==
- Christy, a biopic on West Virginia native Christy Martin, includes scenes taking place in Itmann, West Virginia
