= Glen Fork, West Virginia =

Community in West Virginia, US

Glen Fork
- Census-designated place (CDP)
- Location within the state of West Virginia
- Coordinates: 37°41′48″N 81°31′46″W
- Country: United States
- State: West Virginia
- County: Wyoming

Area
  - Total: 3.085 sq mi (7.99 km^{2})
  - Land: 3.070 sq mi (7.95 km^{2})
  - Water: 0.015 sq mi (0.039 km^{2})

Population (2020)
  - Total: 457
  - Density: 149/sq mi (57.5/km^{2})
- Time zone: UTC-5 (Eastern (EST))
  - Summer (DST): UTC-4 (EDT)
- ZIP codes: 25845

Glen Fork is a census-designated place (CDP) in Wyoming County, West Virginia, United States. As of the 2020 census, its population was 457 (down from 487 at the 2010 census). The confluence of the Laurel Fork and its tributary, the Glen Fork, is located in the community.
