= Brenton, West Virginia =

Community in West Virginia, US

Brenton
- Census-designated place (CDP)
- Location within the state of West Virginia
- Coordinates: 37°35′46″N 81°38′9″W
- Country: United States
- State: West Virginia
- County: Wyoming

Area
  - Total: 0.642 sq mi (1.66 km^{2})
  - Land: 0.629 sq mi (1.63 km^{2})
  - Water: 0.013 sq mi (0.034 km^{2})

Population (2020)
  - Total: 194
  - Density: 308/sq mi (119/km^{2})
- Time zone: UTC-5 (Eastern (EST))
  - Summer (DST): UTC-4 (EDT)
- ZIP Codes: 24818
- Area code: 304

Brenton is a census-designated place (CDP) in Wyoming County, West Virginia, United States. As of the 2020 census, its population was 194 (down from 249 at the 2010 census).

Sue Cline (1946–2021), West Virginia State Senator and businesswoman, lived in Brenton.
