= Black Eagle, West Virginia =

Community in West Virginia, US

Black Eagle
- Unincorporated community
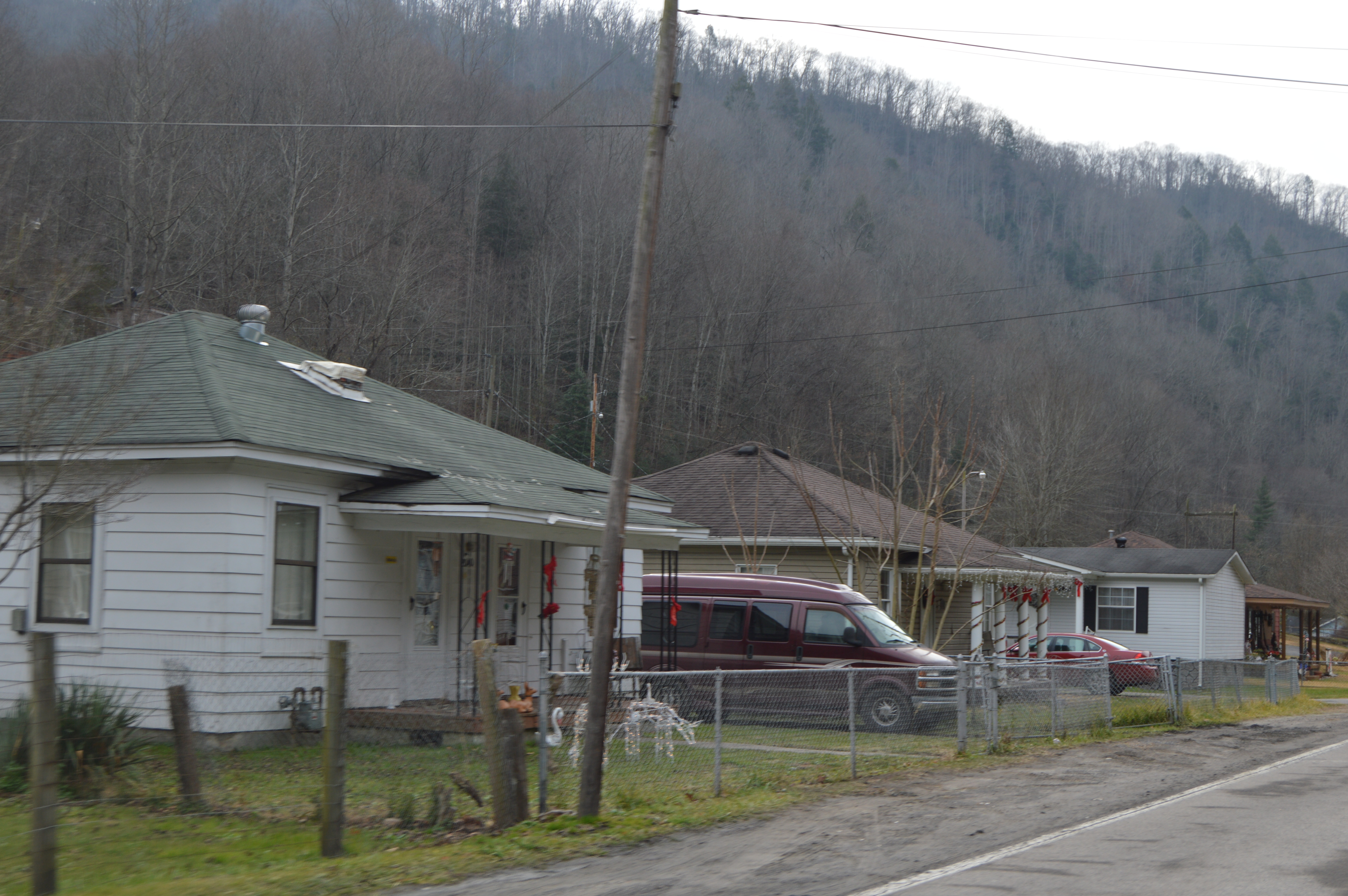
- Residential area on West Virginia Route 16

- Location within the state of West Virginia Black Eagle (the United States)
- Coordinates: 37°35′10″N 81°22′43″W
- Country: United States
- State: West Virginia
- County: Wyoming
- Time zone: UTC-5 (Eastern (EST))
  - Summer (DST): UTC-4 (EDT)
- GNIS feature ID: 1553916

Black Eagle is an unincorporated community in Wyoming County, West Virginia, United States. It was also known as Newlest.
