= Lynco, West Virginia =

Community in West Virginia, US

Lynco
- Unincorporated community
- Location within the state of West Virginia Lynco (the United States)
- Coordinates: 37°41′53″N 81°40′37″W
- Country: United States
- State: West Virginia
- County: Wyoming
- Time zone: UTC-5 (Eastern (EST))
  - Summer (DST): UTC-4 (EDT)
- ZIP codes: 24857
- GNIS feature ID: 1555013

Lynco is an unincorporated community in Wyoming County, West Virginia, United States.
