= Ikes Fork, West Virginia =

Community in West Virginia, US

Ikes Fork
- Unincorporated community
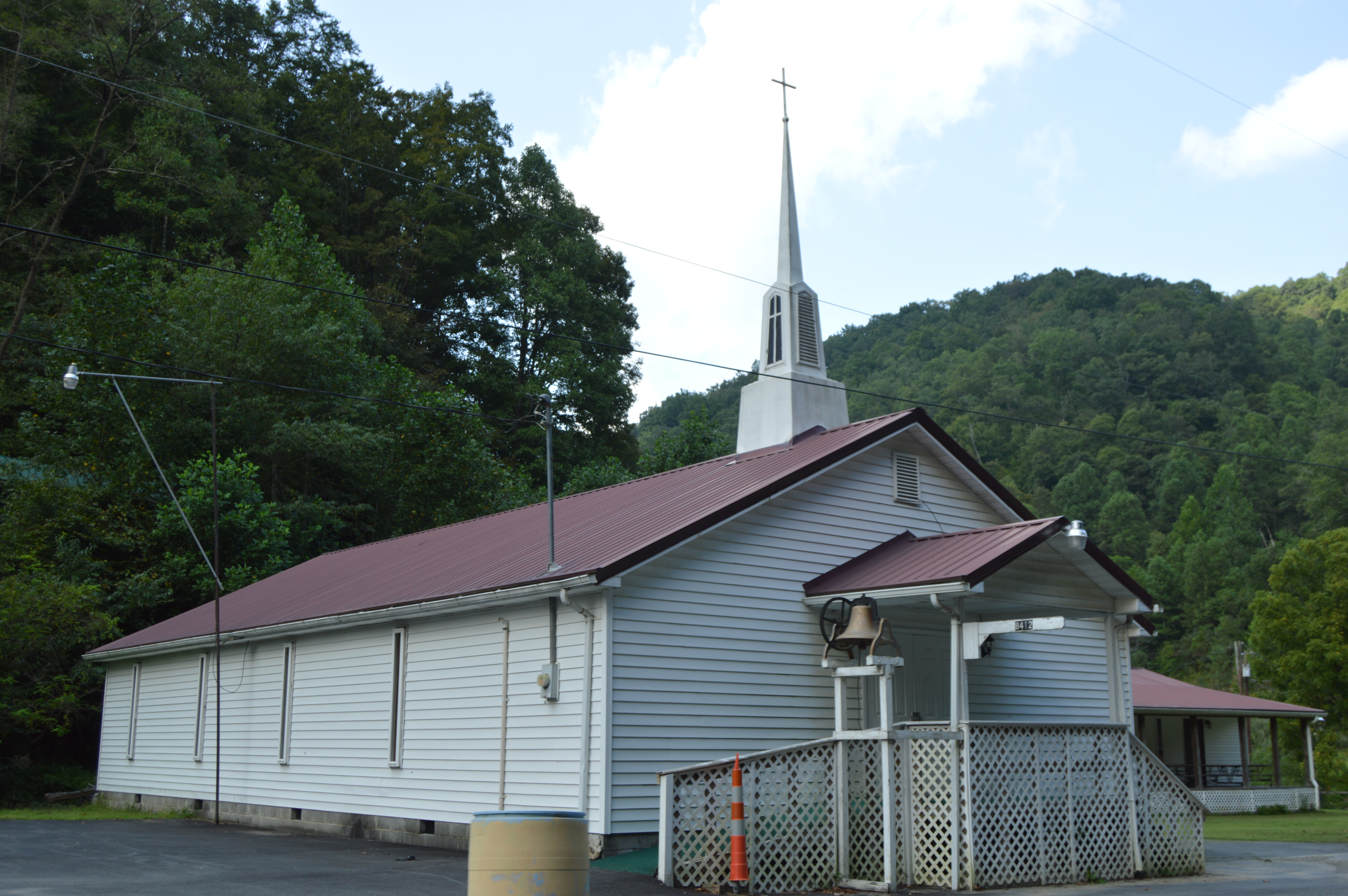
- Church of Zion on U.S. Route 52

- Location within the state of West Virginia Ikes Fork (the United States)
- Coordinates: 37°31′20″N 81°48′16″W
- Country: United States
- State: West Virginia
- County: Wyoming
- Time zone: UTC-5 (Eastern (EST))
  - Summer (DST): UTC-4 (EDT)
- ZIP codes: 24845
- GNIS feature ID: 1540658

Ikes Fork is an unincorporated community in Wyoming County, West Virginia, United States.
