= Fanrock, West Virginia =

Community in West Virginia, US

Fanrock
- Unincorporated community
- Location within the state of West Virginia Fanrock (the United States)
- Coordinates: 37°33′49″N 81°37′45″W
- Country: United States
- State: West Virginia
- County: Wyoming
- Time zone: UTC-5 (Eastern (EST))
  - Summer (DST): UTC-4 (EDT)
- ZIP codes: 24834
- GNIS feature ID: 1538886

Fanrock is an unincorporated community in Wyoming County, West Virginia, United States, along Indian Creek.

Fanrock was home to one of the most unusual airports in the United States. Swope Farm Airfield was a private airfield on a hillside of W.O. Swope's farm. It had a slope of 11% and it was sharply curved at the high end. It was only 1250 feet long, which made takeoffs and landings extremely difficult. The airfield has fallen into disuse in recent years.
