= Metheny =

Metheny is an ancient English surname. People so named include:

- Bud Metheny (1915–2003), Major League Baseball player and college head coach
- C. Brainerd Metheny (1889–1960), American football and basketball coach, college athletics administrator, and insurance executive
- Joe Metheny (1955–2017), American serial killer and cannibal
- Kevin Metheny (1954–2014), American radio and cable network executive
- Linda Metheny (born 1947), American artistic gymnast
- Mike Metheny (born 1949), American jazz flugelhornist and music journalist
- Pat Metheny (born 1954), American jazz guitarist and composer, brother of Mike Metheny

== See also ==
- Matheny (disambiguation)
