= Matheny, West Virginia =

Community in West Virginia, US

Matheny
- Census-designated place (CDP)
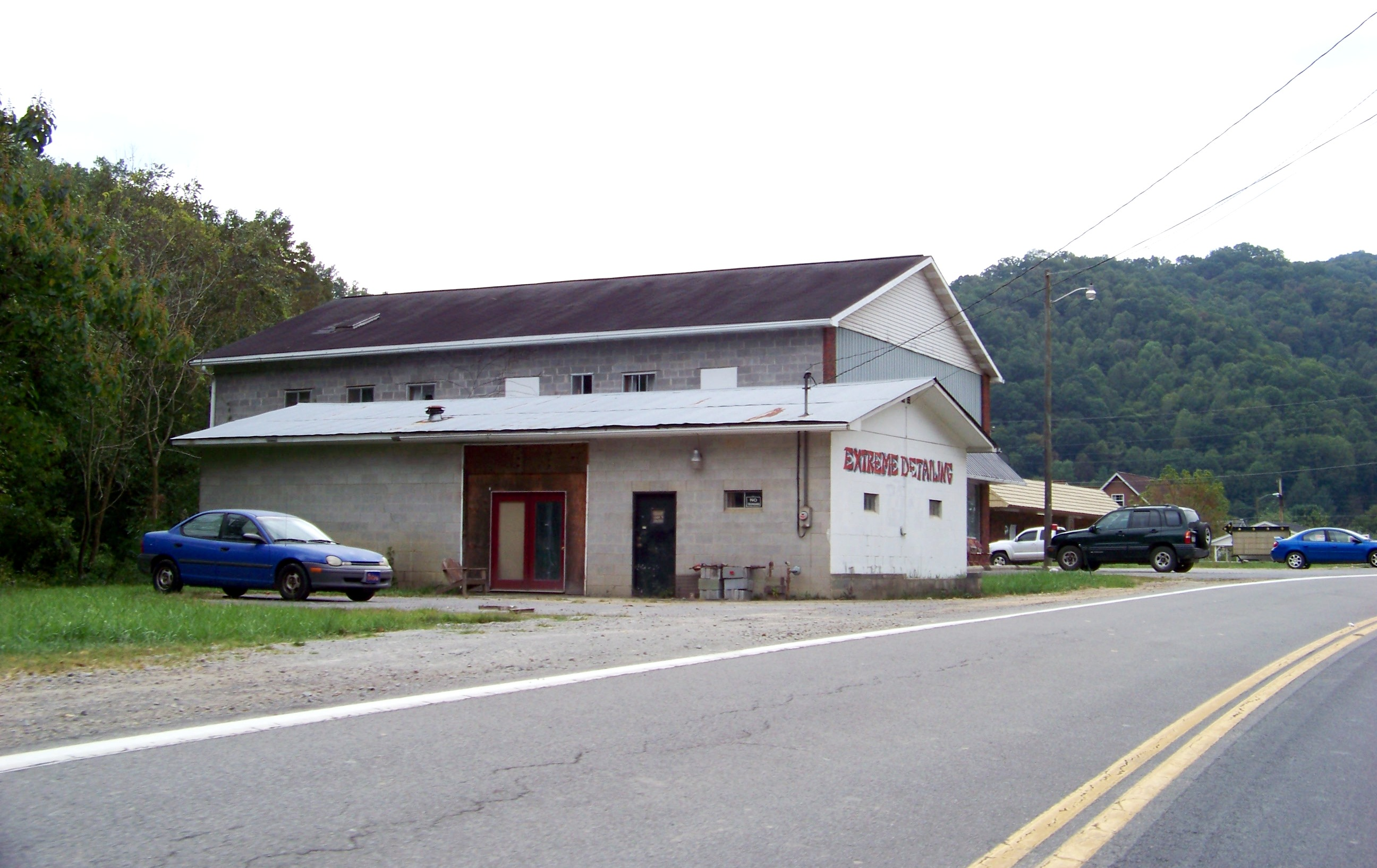
- Entering Matheny

- Location within the state of West Virginia
- Coordinates: 37°39′54″N 81°36′0″W
- Country: United States
- State: West Virginia
- County: Wyoming

Area
  - Total: 3.525 sq mi (9.13 km^{2})
  - Land: 3.501 sq mi (9.07 km^{2})
  - Water: 0.024 sq mi (0.062 km^{2})

Population (2020)
  - Total: 446
  - Density: 127/sq mi (49.2/km^{2})
- Time zone: UTC-5 (Eastern (EST))
  - Summer (DST): UTC-4 (EDT)

Matheny is a census-designated place (CDP) in Wyoming County, West Virginia, United States. As of the 2020 census, its population was 446 (down from 531 at the 2010 census). The Laurel Fork flows through the community.
