= Windom, West Virginia =

Community in West Virginia, US

Windom
- unincorporated community
- Location within the state of West Virginia Windom (the United States)
- Coordinates: 37°35′55″N 81°34′13″W
- Country: United States
- State: West Virginia
- County: Wyoming
- Time zone: UTC-5 (Eastern (EST))
  - Summer (DST): UTC-4 (EDT)
- GNIS feature ID: 1556004

Windom is an unincorporated community in Wyoming County, West Virginia, United States. Windom was originally known as Darby until November 1899. It was named for former United States Secretary of the Treasury, William Windom.
