= Milam Fork =

Stream in West Virginia, U.S.

Coordinates: 37°41′04″N 81°29′06″W

Milam Fork is a stream in the U.S. state of West Virginia.

Milam Fork was named after one Mr. Milam, a pioneer settler.

== See also ==
- List of rivers of West Virginia
