= New Richmond, West Virginia =

Community in West Virginia, US

New Richmond
- Census-designated place (CDP)
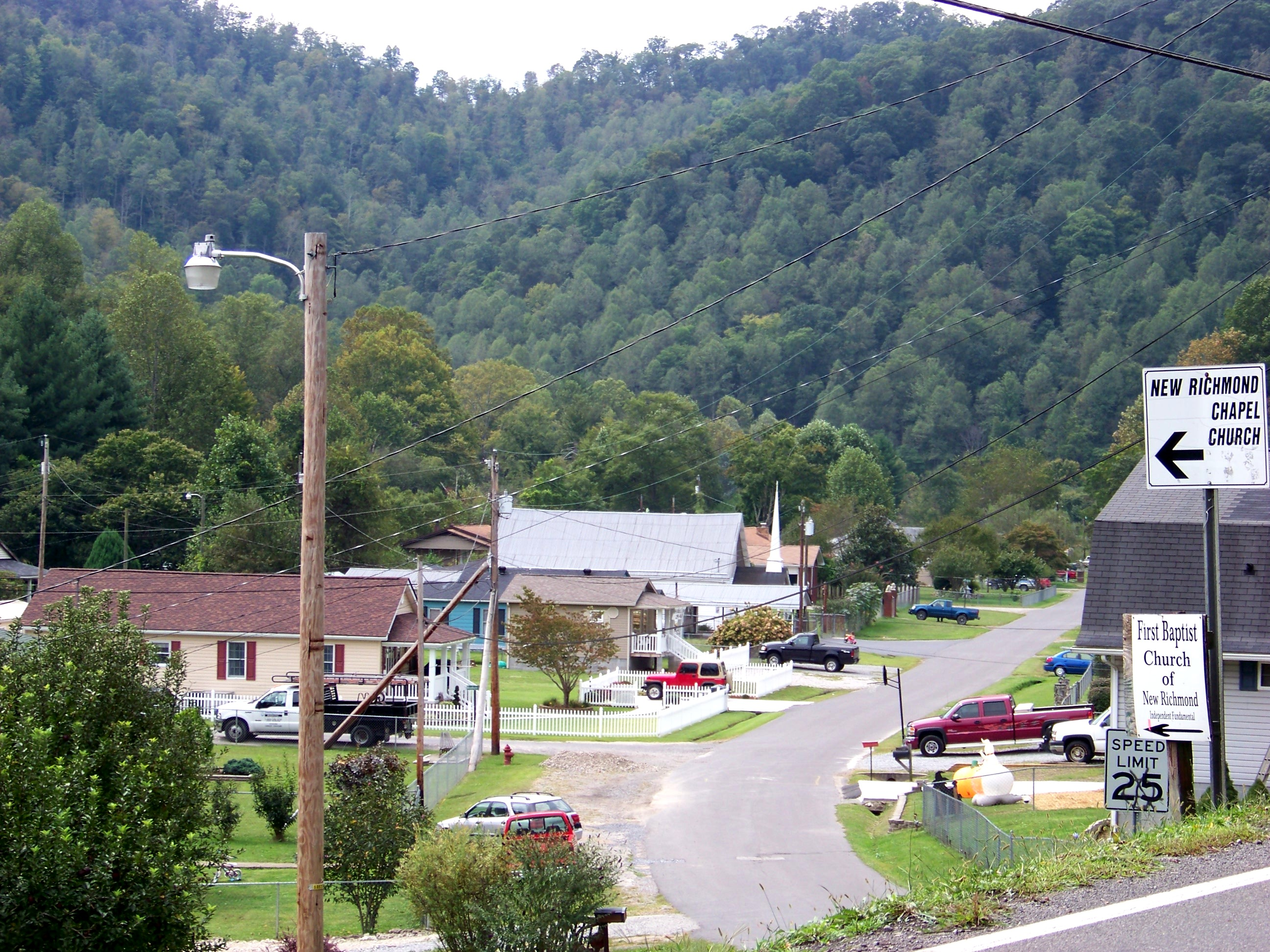

- Location within the state of West Virginia
- Coordinates: 37°34′12″N 81°29′20″W
- Country: United States
- State: West Virginia
- County: Wyoming

Area
  - Total: 0.447 sq mi (1.16 km^{2})
  - Land: 0.431 sq mi (1.12 km^{2})
  - Water: 0.016 sq mi (0.041 km^{2})

Population (2020)
  - Total: 193
  - Density: 448/sq mi (173/km^{2})
- Time zone: UTC-5 (Eastern (EST))
  - Summer (DST): UTC-4 (EDT)

New Richmond is a census-designated place (CDP) in Wyoming County, West Virginia, United States. As of the 2020 census, its population was 193 (down from 238 at the 2010 census). The community is the site of Wyoming East High School.
