= Matheny (surname) =

Matheny is a surname of French origin. Notable people with the surname include:

- Bob Matheny (1929–1978), American basketball player
- Chad Matheny (born 1979), American singer and songwriter, known professionally as Emperor X
- Dmitri Matheny, American jazz flugelhornist
- Jason Gaverick Matheny, American academic and United States national security professional
- Jim Matheny (born 1936), American football player
- Judd Matheny (born 1970), American Tennessee State Representative
- Luke Matheny (born 1976), American actor, writer and director
- Matt Matheny (born 1970), American college basketball coach
- Mike Matheny (born 1970), Major League Baseball manager
- Ray Matheny (1925–2020), professor of anthropology at Brigham Young University
- Taylor Matheny (born 1979), American retired professional wrestler
- William A. Matheny (1902–1973), United States Air Force general

== See also ==
- Metheny
