= Glen Rogers, West Virginia =

Community in West Virginia, US

Glen Rogers
- Unincorporated community
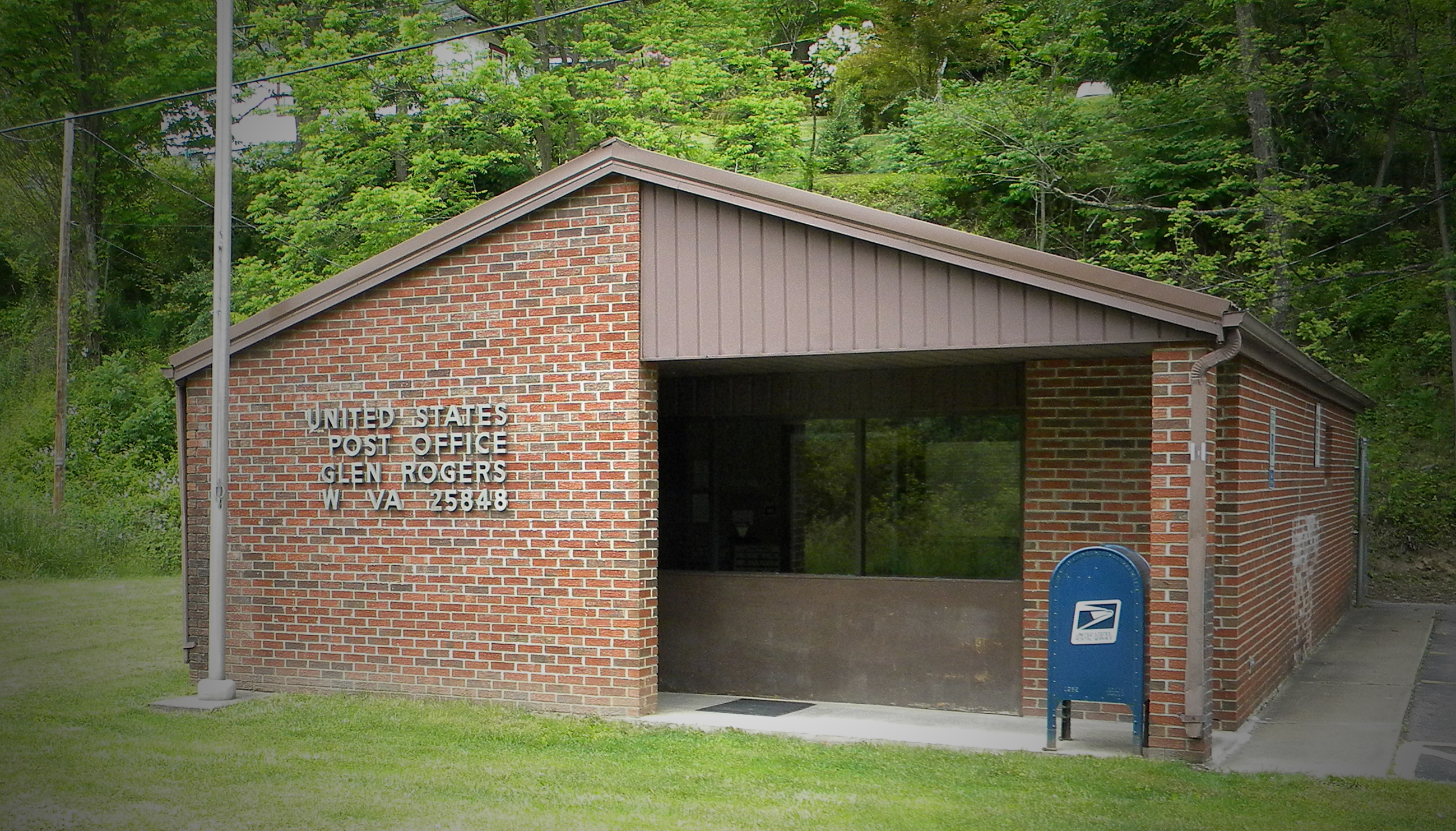
- Glen Rogers West Virginia Post Office

- Location within the state of West Virginia Glen Rogers (the United States)
- Coordinates: 37°42′55″N 81°25′4″W
- Country: United States
- State: West Virginia
- County: Wyoming
- Time zone: UTC-5 (Eastern (EST))
  - Summer (DST): UTC-4 (EDT)
- ZIP codes: 25848
- GNIS feature ID: 1554568

Glen Rogers is an unincorporated community in Wyoming County, West Virginia, United States, along the Laurel Fork.

== Notable person ==
- William C. Marland, former Governor of West Virginia
