= Wyoming County, West Virginia =

County in West Virginia, United States

- County
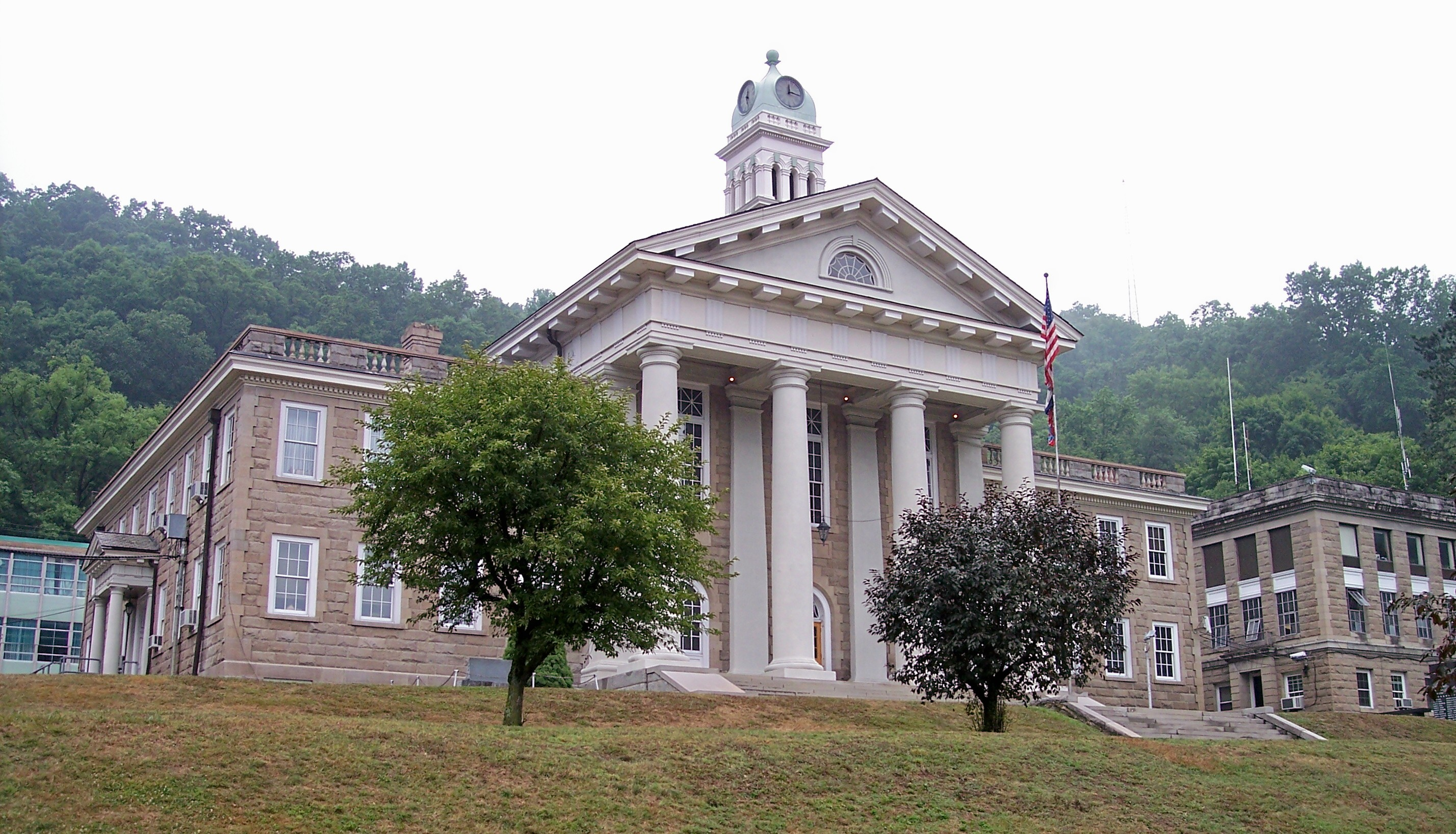
- Wyoming County Courthouse and Jail in Pineville

- Seal

- Location within the U.S. state of West Virginia
- Coordinates: 37°37′N 81°32′W
- Country: United States
- State: West Virginia
- Founded: January 26, 1850
- Seat: Pineville
- Largest city: Mullens

Area
  - Total: 502 sq mi (1,300 km^{2})
  - Land: 499 sq mi (1,290 km^{2})
  - Water: 2.4 sq mi (6.2 km^{2}) 0.5%

Population (2020)
  - Total: 21,382
  - Estimate (2025): 19,801 ▼
  - Density: 42.8/sq mi (16.5/km^{2})
- Time zone: UTC−5 (Eastern)
  - Summer (DST): UTC−4 (EDT)
- Congressional district: 1st
- Website: www.wyomingcounty.com

Wyoming County is a county in the U.S. state of West Virginia. As of the 2020 census, the population was 21,382. Its county seat is Pineville. The county was created in 1850 from Logan County and named for the Lenape word meaning "large plains".

Wyoming County is home to Twin Falls Resort State Park, R.D Bailey Lake, and the headquarters of STAT Ambulance Service, a southern West Virginia wide EMS provider.

== History ==
During the 18th century, the area that became Wyoming County was used as hunting grounds by the Shawnee, Mingo, Delaware, and Seneca. The Iroquois Confederacy and Cherokee held competing claims to southern West Virginia. British settlement west of the Appalachian Mountains was restricted by the Royal Proclamation of 1763, but settlers continued to enter the region. Treaties negotiated in 1768 and the Shawnee defeat in Lord Dunmore’s War in 1774 helped open southern West Virginia to further colonial settlement, although conflict continued during the American Revolutionary War. After the war, expanding settlement placed increasing pressure on Indigenous peoples and contributed to their displacement westward.

Wyoming County was formed from parts of Logan County by the Virginia General Assembly on January 26th, 1850. Oceana was the seat of county government from 1850 until it was moved to Pineville in 1907.

Large-scale timbering began in the 1880s, with logs floated down the Guyandotte River toward Huntington. Timber extraction was one of the county's first major commercial industries before the expansion of coal mining.

The completion of the Virginian Railway in 1909 transformed the county's economy by providing a route for coal to reach Atlantic ports. Mullens became a major railroad center, and coal development drove substantial population growth.

On November 6th 1923, a methane explosion at the Glen Rogers mine killed 27 mine workers in Wyoming County’s deadliest disaster. Investigators attributed the explosion to changes in ventilation that caused a gas build up before being ignited by an electric drill. Opened in 1921, the mine became one of West Virginia’s largest mining operations, employing around 900 workers and producing more than one million tons of coal annually during the 1930s and 1940s. Other accidents killed five workers in 1922, eight workers in 1931, and five in 1957, a total of 160 workers died at the mine before its closure in 1960.

== Geography ==
According to the United States Census Bureau, the county has a total area of 502 square miles (1,300 km^{2}), of which 499 square miles (1,290 km^{2}) is land and 2.4 square miles (6.2 km^{2}) (0.5%) is water. The county is drained by the branches of Sandy and Guyandotte rivers. The land surface is mountainous.

In 1863, West Virginia's counties were divided into civil townships, with the intention of encouraging local government. This proved impractical in the heavily rural state, and in 1872 the townships were converted into magisterial districts. Wyoming County was divided into six districts: Barkers Ridge, (Note: Spelled "Barker's Ridge" before 1890.) Center, (Note: Originally spelled "Centre".) Clear Fork, Huff Creek, (Note: Originally "Huff's Creek".) Oceana, and Slab Fork. A seventh district, Baileysville, was created from portions of Clear Fork and Huff Creek in 1881. Except for minor adjustments, the seven historic magisterial districts remained largely unchanged for over a century. In the 1990s, they were consolidated into three new districts: District 1, District 2, and District 3.

=== Major highways ===
- U.S. Route 52
- West Virginia Route 10
- West Virginia Route 16
- West Virginia Route 54
- West Virginia Route 80
- West Virginia Route 85
- West Virginia Route 97
- West Virginia Route 99
- West Virginia Route 121
- West Virginia Route 971

=== Adjacent counties ===
- Boone County (north)
- Raleigh County (northeast)
- Mercer County (southeast)
- McDowell County (south)
- Mingo County (west)
- Logan County (northwest)

== Demographics ==
Historical population
Census	Pop.	Note	%±
1850	1,645		—
1860	2,861		73.9%
1870	3,171		10.8%
1880	4,322		36.3%
1890	6,247		44.5%
1900	8,380		34.1%
1910	10,392		24.0%
1920	15,180		46.1%
1930	20,926		37.9%
1940	29,774		42.3%
1950	37,540		26.1%
1960	34,836		−7.2%
1970	30,095		−13.6%
1980	35,993		19.6%
1990	28,990		−19.5%
2000	25,708		−11.3%
2010	23,796		−7.4%
2020	21,382		−10.1%
2025 (est.)	19,801	▼	−7.4%
U.S. Decennial Census; 1790–1960 1900–1990; 1990–2000 2010–2020

=== Population Trends ===
Wyoming County’s census counts show long-term population growth through the mid-twentieth century, followed by persistent decline. The population peaked at 37,540 residents in 1950 and has fallen to 21,382 in 2020, a drop of more than 40 percent over seven decades. This decline has been gradual but continuous across most decades since 1960, with only a brief rebound around 1980. Demographers and journalists writing about southern West Virginia’s coalfield counties have linked this long-term population loss to the contraction of coal mining employment, limited diversification of the local economy, and sustained out-migration of younger adults seeking work elsewhere. More recent estimates from the U.S. Census Bureau continue to show small declines year-to-year in the county’s population, suggesting that both net out-migration and natural decrease (more deaths than births) are contributing to the ongoing reduction in population size.

=== 2020 census ===
As of the 2020 census, the county had a population of 21,382. Of the residents, 20.9% were under the age of 18 and 21.7% were 65 years of age or older; the median age was 45.0 years. For every 100 females there were 98.0 males, and for every 100 females age 18 and over there were 97.2 males.

The racial makeup of the county was 96.3% White, 0.5% Black or African American, 0.1% American Indian and Alaska Native, 0.1% Asian, 0.1% from some other race, and 2.8% from two or more races. Hispanic or Latino residents of any race comprised 0.8% of the population.

There were 8,545 households in the county, of which 28.6% had children under the age of 18 living with them and 24.2% had a female householder with no spouse or partner present. About 25.7% of all households were made up of individuals and 13.4% had someone living alone who was 65 years of age or older.

There were 9,949 housing units, of which 14.1% were vacant. Among occupied housing units, 80.5% were owner-occupied and 19.5% were renter-occupied. The homeowner vacancy rate was 1.5% and the rental vacancy rate was 7.2%.

Wyoming County, West Virginia – Racial and ethnic composition Note: the US Census treats Hispanic/Latino as an ethnic category. This table excludes Latinos from the racial categories and assigns them to a separate category. Hispanics/Latinos may be of any race.
Race / Ethnicity (NH = Non-Hispanic)	Pop 2000	Pop 2010	Pop 2020	% 2000	% 2010	% 2020
White alone (NH)	25,221	23,270	20,539	98.11%	97.79%	96.06%
Black or African American alone (NH)	161	116	107	0.63%	0.49%	0.50%
Native American or Alaska Native alone (NH)	31	33	30	0.12%	0.14%	0.14%
Asian alone (NH)	20	25	11	0.08%	0.11%	0.05%
Pacific Islander alone (NH)	0	2	1	0.00%	0.01%	0.00%
Other race alone (NH)	13	5	20	0.05%	0.02%	0.09%
Mixed race or Multiracial (NH)	127	240	504	0.49%	1.01%	2.36%
Hispanic or Latino (any race)	135	105	170	0.53%	0.44%	0.80%
Total	25,708	23,796	21,382	100.00%	100.00%	100.00%

=== 2010 census ===
As of the 2010 United States census, there were 23,796 people, 9,687 households, and 6,947 families living in the county. The population density was 47.6 inhabitants per square mile (18.4/km^{2}). There were 10,958 housing units at an average density of 21.9 units per square mile (8.5 units/km^{2}). The racial makeup of the county was 98.2% white, 0.5% black or African American, 0.1% Asian, 0.1% American Indian, 0.1% from other races, and 1.0% from two or more races. Those of Hispanic or Latino origin made up 0.4% of the population. The largest ancestry groups were: 13.8% Irish, 13.2% English, 13.2% American, 12.6% German, 2.1% Italian, 1.2% Scotch-Irish, 1.2% Dutch, and 1.1% Scottish.

Of the 9,687 households, 30.8% had children under the age of 18 living with them, 56.3% were married couples living together, 10.3% had a female householder with no husband present, 28.3% were non-families, and 25.1% of all households were made up of individuals. The average household size was 2.45 and the average family size was 2.90. The median age was 42.6 years.

The median income for a household in the county was $36,343 and the median income for a family was $46,221. Males had a median income of $43,942 versus $26,428 for females. The per capita income for the county was $17,662. About 13.4% of families and 17.3% of the population were below the poverty line, including 24.4% of those under age 18 and 8.9% of those age 65 or over.

=== 2000 census ===
As of the census of 2000, there were 25,709 people, 10,454 households, and 7,704 families living in the county. The population density was 51 people per square mile (20 people/km^{2}). There were 11,698 housing units at an average density of 23 units per square mile (8.9 units/km^{2}). The racial makeup of the county was 98.59% White, 0.63% Black or African American, 0.12% Native American, 0.08% Asian, 0.07% from other races, and 0.51% from two or more races. 0.53% of the population were Hispanic or Latino of any race.

There were 10,454 households, out of which 31.00% had children under the age of 18 living with them, 59.30% were married couples living together, 10.50% had a female householder with no husband present, and 26.30% were non-families. 24.40% of all households were made up of individuals, and 11.50% had someone living alone who was 65 years of age or older. The average household size was 2.45 and the average family size was 2.89.

In the county, the population was spread out, with 22.40% under the age of 18, 8.70% from 18 to 24, 27.50% from 25 to 44, 27.40% from 45 to 64, and 13.90% who were 65 years of age or older. The median age was 40 years. For every 100 females there were 96.90 males. For every 100 females age 18 and over, there were 93.20 males.

The median income for a household in the county was $23,932, and the median income for a family was $29,709. Males had a median income of $32,493 versus $18,812 for females. The per capita income for the county was $14,220. About 20.20% of families and 25.10% of the population were below the poverty line, including 36.90% of those under age 18 and 13.50% of those age 65 or over.

== Politics ==
United States presidential election results for Wyoming County, West Virginia
Year	Republican		Democratic		Third party(ies)	
Year	No.	%	No.	%	No.	%
1912	569	27.38%	881	42.40%	628	30.22%
1916	1,484	55.17%	1,199	44.57%	7	0.26%
1920	2,950	61.78%	1,825	38.22%	0	0.00%
1924	3,327	54.69%	2,358	38.76%	398	6.54%
1928	3,987	56.68%	3,047	43.32%	0	0.00%
1932	4,007	47.69%	4,396	52.31%	0	0.00%
1936	3,601	34.84%	6,734	65.16%	0	0.00%
1940	4,378	35.94%	7,802	64.06%	0	0.00%
1944	4,253	38.66%	6,748	61.34%	0	0.00%
1948	4,198	38.34%	6,725	61.43%	25	0.23%
1952	6,124	40.41%	9,029	59.59%	0	0.00%
1956	7,044	49.74%	7,118	50.26%	0	0.00%
1960	5,083	37.14%	8,603	62.86%	0	0.00%
1964	3,377	26.88%	9,188	73.12%	0	0.00%
1968	3,947	34.04%	6,641	57.27%	1,007	8.68%
1972	7,926	63.95%	4,468	36.05%	0	0.00%
1976	4,286	35.54%	7,775	64.46%	0	0.00%
1980	4,537	39.41%	6,624	57.54%	351	3.05%
1984	5,379	48.48%	5,691	51.29%	25	0.23%
1988	3,516	36.31%	6,138	63.38%	30	0.31%
1992	2,821	29.36%	5,782	60.19%	1,004	10.45%
1996	2,155	25.21%	5,550	64.92%	844	9.87%
2000	3,473	44.08%	4,289	54.44%	116	1.47%
2004	4,985	57.18%	3,694	42.37%	39	0.45%
2008	4,621	61.37%	2,735	36.32%	174	2.31%
2012	5,769	76.65%	1,583	21.03%	174	2.31%
2016	6,547	83.08%	1,062	13.48%	271	3.44%
2020	7,353	85.58%	1,157	13.47%	82	0.95%
2024	6,503	85.96%	980	12.95%	82	1.08%

== Communities ==
=== City ===
- Mullens

=== Towns ===
- Oceana
- Pineville (county seat)

=== Magisterial districts ===
==== Current ====
- District 1
- District 2
- District 3

==== Historic ====
- Baileysville
- Barkers Ridge
- Center
- Clear Fork
- Huff
- Oceana
- Slab Fork

=== Census-designated places ===
- Brenton
- Bud
- Corinne
- Covel
- Glen Fork
- Itmann
- Kopperston
- Matheny
- New Richmond

=== Unincorporated communities ===
- Allen Junction
- Alpoca
- Amigo
- Baileysville
- Beechwood
- Black Eagle
- Clear Fork
- Coal Mountain
- Crany
- Cyclone
- Fanny
- Fanrock
- Garwood
- Glen Rogers
- Glover
- Hanover
- Herndon
- Ikes Fork
- Jesse
- Key Rock
- Lacoma
- Lynco
- Maben
- Marianna
- McGraws-Tipple
- Milam
- North Spring
- Otsego
- Pierpont
- Ravencliff
- Rock View
- Sabine
- Saulsville
- Stephenson
- Tralee
- Windom
- Wolf Pen
- Wyco
- Wyoming

== Notable people ==
- Bernie Casey, football player and actor
- Mike D'Antoni, NBA coach
- William C. Marland, West Virginia Governor
- Christy Martin, professional boxer
- Darrell McGraw, Attorney General of West Virginia (1993-2013)
- Jamie Noble, professional wrestler
- Joe Pendry, NFL coach
- Nat Reese, former blues musician
- Heath Slater, professional wrestler
- Curt Warner, football player
- Greg White, college basketball coach and motivational speaker

== See also ==
- Horse Creek Wildlife Management Area
- National Register of Historic Places listings in Wyoming County West Virginia
- Twin Falls Resort State Park
