= List of Delta Kappa Gamma members =

Delta Kappa Gamma is an international professional society for women educators. It was established in 1929 at the University of Texas at Austin. Following is a list of some of its notable members

== Academia ==
- Nora Beust, author and professor of library science at the University of North Carolina at Chapel Hill
- Chrystelle Trump Bond, dancer, choreographer, dance historian, and founding chair of the dance department at Goucher College
- Elenora A. Cawthon, professor and dean at Louisiana Tech University
- Winifred B. Chase, professor of botany and the dean of women at Wayne State University
- Annie Moore Cherry, professor at Flora MacDonald College and playwright
- Ursula Franklin (honorary), metallurgist and research physicist at the University of Toronto
- Adele L. Grant, botanist, academic, and founder of Sigma Delta Epsilon
- Agnes Ellen Harris, one of the earliest practitioners of the field of domestic science and dean of women at the University of Alabama
- Helen L. Koch, developmental psychologist and a faculty member at the University of Texas at Austin and the University of Chicago
- Anna Lewis, historian and teacher at the Oklahoma College for Women
- Ruby Terrill Lomax, folklorist and dean of Women at University of Texas at Austin
- Luella St. Clair Moss, president of the Christian Female College
- Mary Louisa Willard, professor at Pennsylvania State University known for her work in microscopy and forensic science

== Arts ==
- Charlotte Partridge, artist; co-founder and director of the Layton School of Art
- Effie Anderson Smith, impressionist desert landscape artist
- Coreen Mary Spellman, printmaker, painter, and college professor

== Education ==
- C. Louise Boehringer, superintendent of schools in Yuma County, Arizona
- Annie Webb Blanton, Texas state superintendent of public instruction and faculty of the University of Texas
- Bernice Tlalane Mohapeloa, educator and activist
- Charlie Mary Noble (honorary), teacher of astronomy and mathematics
- Jessie M. Parker, Iowa superintendent of public instruction, 1939 to 1954
- Esther Pilster, educator and principal
- Fannie Stebbins (honorary), science teacher and naturalist

== Law ==
- Florence E. Allen, associate justice of the Ohio Supreme Court and senior judge of the United States Court of Appeals for the Sixth Circuit
- Susie Sharp, Chief Justice of the North Carolina Supreme Court

== Literature and journalism ==
- Cordelia Camp, biographer and director of student teaching at Western Carolina College
- Kay Cornelius, novelist
- Blanche Evans Dean, author, naturalist, and conservationist
- Anne Grimes (honorary), journalist, musician, and historian of American Midwestern folklore
- Guðrún P. Helgadóttir, writer, poet, and the principal of Kvennaskólinn í Reykjavík
- Nellie Shaw Harnar, Northern Paiute historian, author, and educator
- Malvina Lindsay (honorary), editor and columnist at The Washington Post

== Politics ==
- Nellah Massey Bailey, Mississippi State Tax Collector and First Lady of Mississippi
- Jeannie Baliles, First Lady of Virginia
- Mae Shumate Belcher, West Virginia House of Delegates
- Marguerite Stitt Church, United States House of Representatives
- Jean M. Doerge, Louisiana House of Representatives
- March Fong Eu, United States Ambassador to Micronesia, Secretary of State of California, and California State Assembly
- Sue Ramsey Johnston Ferguson, North Carolina Senate
- Martha Thomas Fitzgerald, South Carolina House of Representatives
- Janet Hill Gordon, New York State Senate and New York State Assembly
- Susan Johns (honorary), Kentucky Senate and Kentucky House of Representatives
- Eddie Bernice Johnson, United States House of Representatives, Texas Senate, and Texas House of Representatives
- Daisy Lawler, Oklahoma Senate
- Marion Martin, Maine Senate, and Maine House of Representatives
- Danielle Moore, Missouri House of Representatives
- Maurine Neuberger, United States Senate
- Phoebe M. Orebaugh, Virginia House of Delegates
- Grace Taylor Rodenbough, North Carolina House of Representatives
- Dorothy H. Rose, New York State Assembly
- Jae Spears, West Virginia House of Delegates and West Virginia State Senate
- Kathryn H. Stone, Virginia House of Delegates
- Marian Van Landingham, Virginia House of Delegates

== Sports ==
- Anna Hiss, professor, instrumental in improving the field of physical education by professionalizing the field
- Barbara Howard, sprinter

== Other ==
- Hally Ballinger Bryan Perry, co-founder of the Daughters of the Republic of Texas

== See also ==
- List of Delta Kappa Gamma chapters
