= Texas Woman's University =

Public research university in Denton, Texas, US

Coordinates: 33.225°N 97.128°W

- Former names: Texas Industrial Institute and College for the Education of White Girls of the State of Texas in the Arts and Sciences (1901–1903); Girls Industrial College (1903–1905); College of Industrial Arts (1905–1934); Texas State College for Women (1934–1957)
- Type: Public Hispanic-serving university
- Established: 1901; 125 years ago
- Parent institution: Texas Woman's University System
- Endowment: $133.2 million (FY2024)
- Chancellor: Carine Feyten
- Students: 12,835 (Denton); 15,472 (all campuses)
- Undergraduates: 10,306
- Postgraduates: 5,166
- Location: Denton, Texas, United States
- Campus: 270 acres (1.1 km^{2}); Suburban
- Other campuses: Dallas; Houston
- Colors: Maroon and white
- Nickname: Pioneers
- Sporting affiliations: NCAA Division II – Lone Star
- Mascots: Oakley, the Barn Owl
- Website: twu.edu
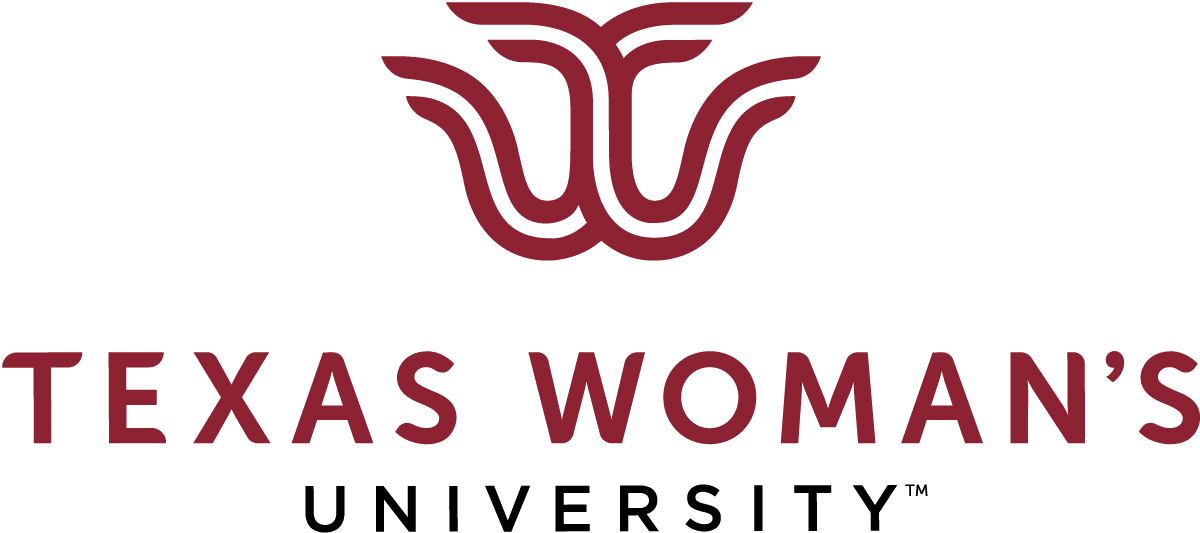

Texas Woman's University (TWU) is a public coeducational research university in Denton, Texas, United States. It also has two health science campuses in Dallas and Houston. While TWU has been fully co-educational since 1994, it is the largest state-supported university primarily for women in the United States. The university is part of the Texas Woman's University System. It offers undergraduate and graduate degree programs in 60 areas of study across six colleges. The university is classified among "R2: High Research Spending and Doctorate Production".

== History ==
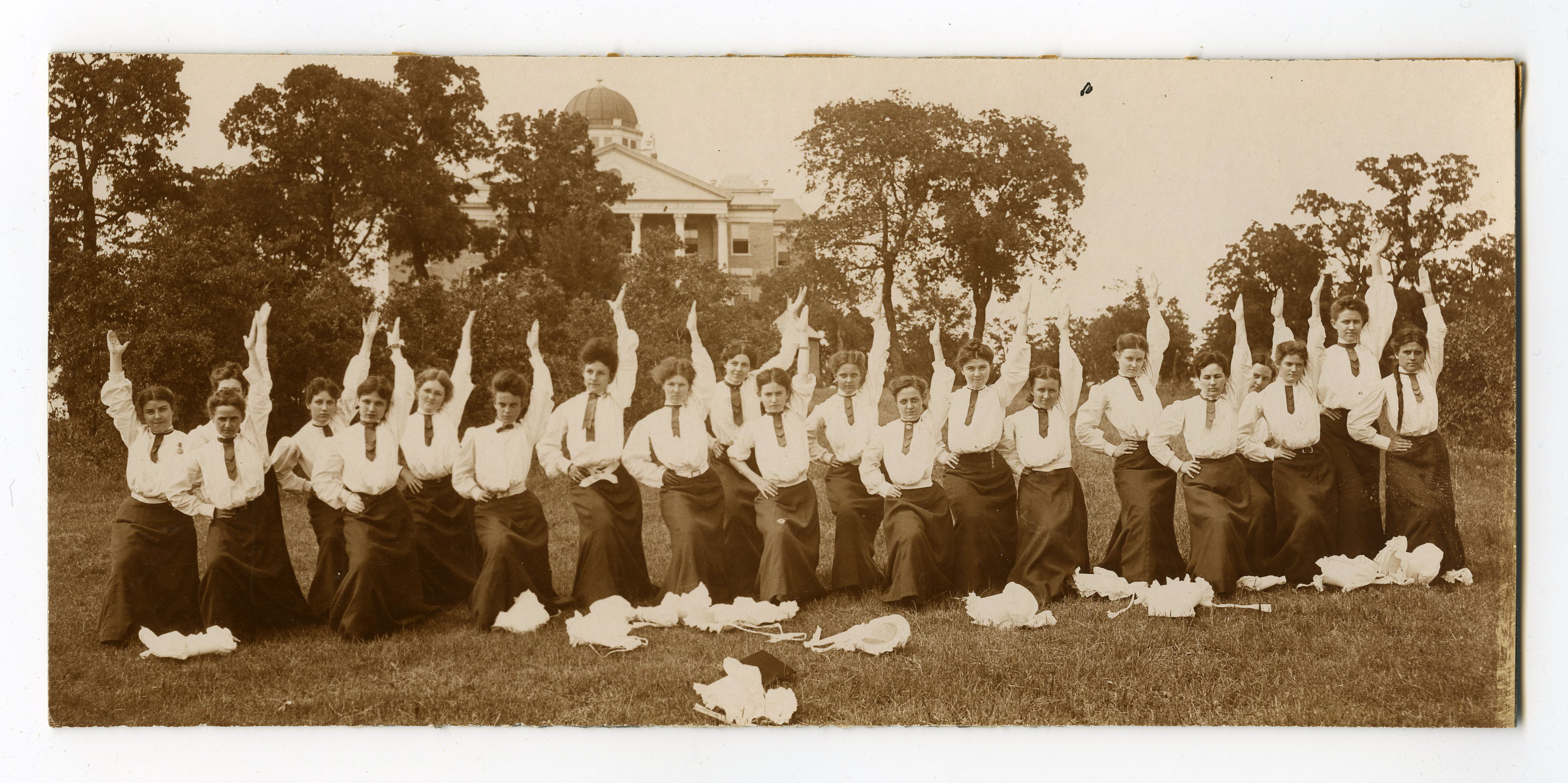
Students of physical education

In the late 19th century, several Texas-based groups (including the Texas Press Women's Association, the Texas Federation of Women's Clubs, the Grange, and the Woman's Christian Temperance Union) began advocating for the creation of a state-supported women's college focused on a practical education, including domestic skills young women would need as wives and mothers. In 1901, after the state Democratic Party adopted the idea as a platform in the upcoming election, the college's establishment was authorized by the Texas Legislature. Originally named the "Texas Industrial Institute and College for the Education of White Girls of the State of Texas in the Arts and Sciences", it opened in Denton in 1902 with a class of 186 students and 14 faculty. The three women on its inaugural board of regents were the first women to sit on the governing board of a Texas university. The school was renamed the "Girls Industrial College" in 1903 and conferred its first degrees in 1904. In 1905, the name changed again to the "College of Industrial Arts" and the school expanded its programs to include liberal arts, fine arts, and sciences.

Upon its founding, the school was primarily focused on educating rural and small town women seeking vocational training. Since many areas of the state lacked comprehensive high schools, the first two years of CIA's curriculum were preparatory; students enrolling with a high school diploma were automatically admitted as juniors. With its home extension program and summer school, the school was the first in Texas to offer instruction in home economics, supplying an overwhelming majority of the state's high school teachers in home economics in the early 20th century. In 1914, CIA implemented its first four-year college curriculum, and the first bachelor's degrees were conferred in 1915. By 1929, the college had expanded its programs sufficiently to be accredited by the Southern Association of Colleges and Secondary Schools, the American Association of University Women, and the Association of American Universities, and it began offering its first master's degrees in 1930. In 1934, the school underwent another name change to the "Texas State College for Women (TSCW)" to reflect its growing reputation as a premiere institution of higher education for women in the state.

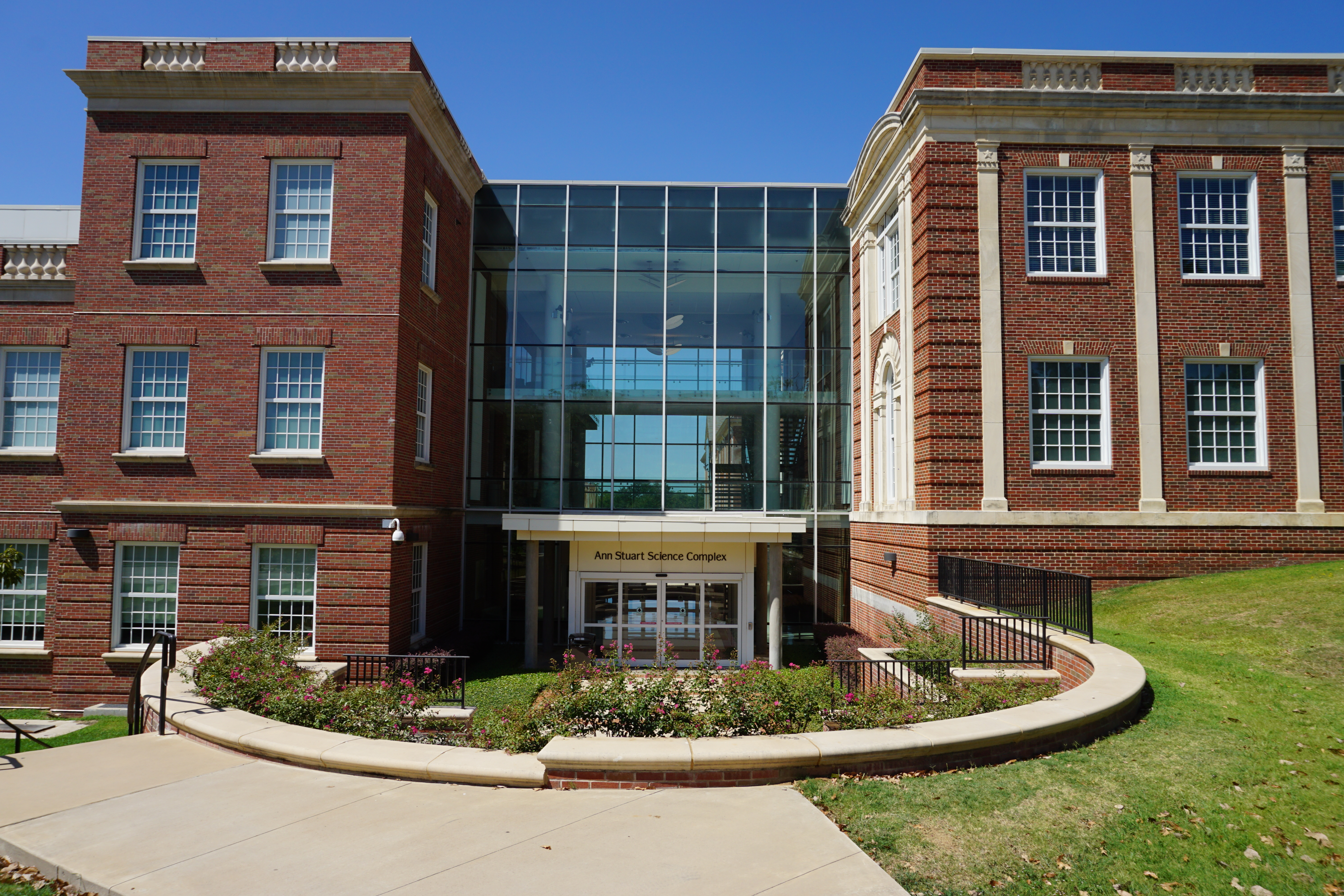
Ann Stuart Science Complex

Despite the social and cultural limitations for professional women at the time, the college pioneered several academic programs to meet the needs of Texas's growing postwar economy and built a national reputation for its programs and research in textiles, food, and nutrition, awarding its first doctoral degrees in 1953. In 1950, it developed the first nationally accredited nursing program in the state, opening at the original Parkland Hospital in downtown Dallas in 1954, and joining the Oak Ridge Institute for Nuclear Studies in the 1960s, receiving a series of research grants from the National Aeronautics and Space Administration to study the health effects on humans of space flights. In 1956, it established Texas's first building dedicated solely to the instruction of library sciences. Finally, in 1957, the school changed its name to "Texas Woman's University" and expanded its health sciences programs to a campus in Houston in 1960.

The college also enjoyed a close relationship with Texas A&M University in College Station in the early and mid-20th century. As the only gender segregated public colleges in Texas at the time, the schools generated considerable media attention for their institutional-supported fraternizing at major sporting and social events; for several decades, a "Tessie" was named the "Aggie Sweetheart" at A&M's football rivalry matchup. The practice fizzled in the 1970s when each school began admitting both male and female students, although the schools do still collaborate in several academic and service programs.

Like most non-HBCU institutions in Texas, the school originally admitted only white students. It integrated in 1961, admitting its first African-American student, Alsenia Dowells, to study nursing; while Dowells only attended for one year, six more black women enrolled the next year. The university now has a 20% black student population and is also designated as a Hispanic-serving institution and a member of Hispanic Association of Colleges and Universities, with more than 25% of its full-time student population identifying as Hispanic or Latina. After nearly six decades as a school for women, TWU began admitting men into its health sciences graduate school in 1972 in response to pending litigation at other universities regarding the Equal Protection Clause. In 1994, in anticipation of changing protocols of single-gender institutions across the United States, the school opened all of its programs to qualified men.

Despite being a co-educational university since 1972, TWU's student body remains approximately 90% women, and it continues to place a heavy emphasis on meeting the educational needs of women. It remains unique among Texas higher education institutions by requiring all undergraduates, regardless of their proposed major or degree, to take three credit hours of multicultural women's studies.

== Campuses ==
=== Main campus ===
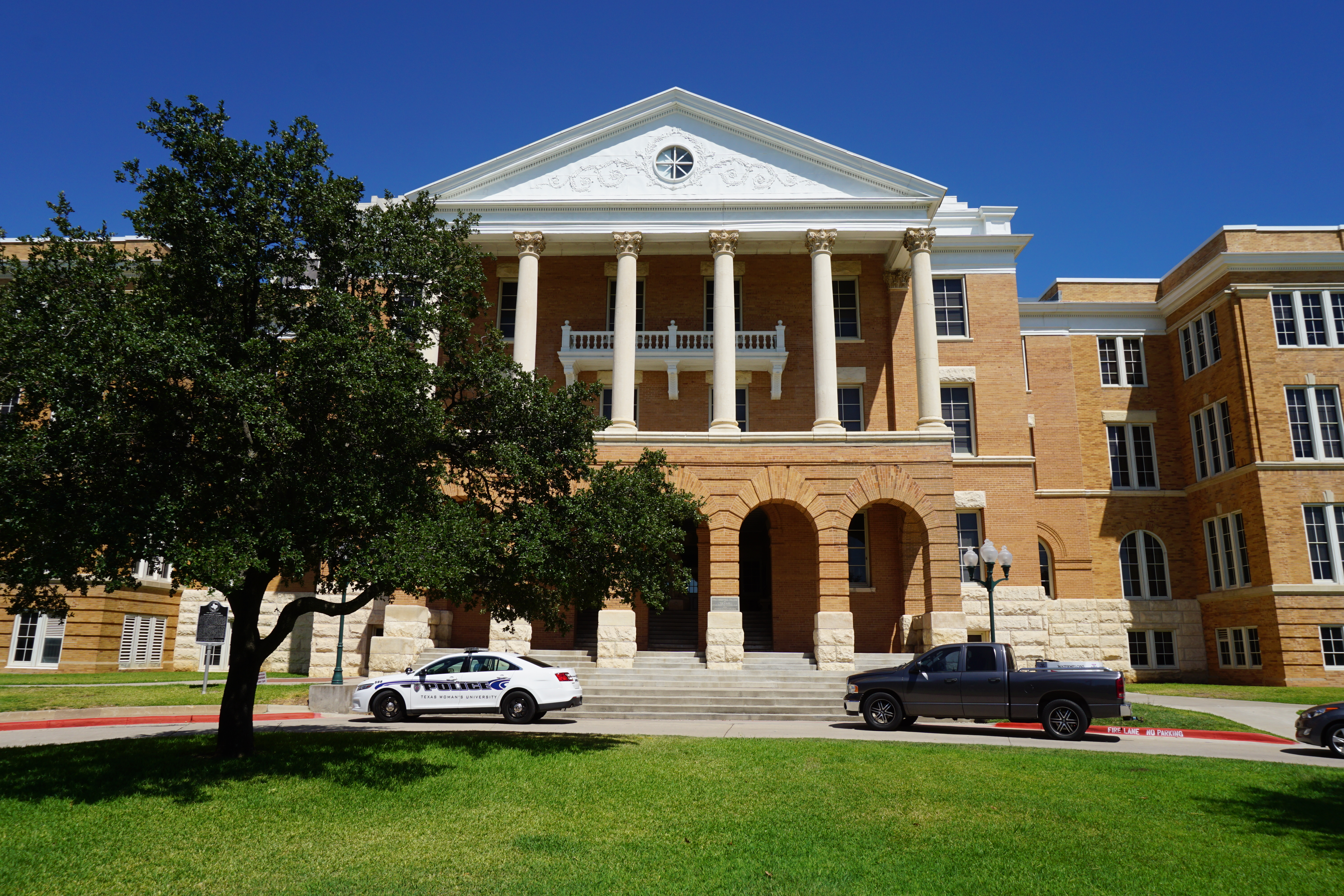
Old Main Building

The university's flagship Denton campus consists of 270 acres (110 ha) in Denton, Texas, about 40 miles (64 km) northwest of Dallas. Upon the university's founding, the Old Main Building was constructed in 1902 and housed all of the school's academic programs and students. The first dormitory opened in 1907, and a second classroom building was constructed in 1911.

During the Great Depression, college president L. H. Hubbard used funds available through the federal Works Projects Administration and Public Works Administration to expand the campus infrastructure, which doubled instructional space, improved local roads and sidewalks, and established regional landmarks such as the Little Chapel in the Woods. In 1938, the campus was gifted the Pioneer Woman statue by the state legislature, commissioned to Leo Friedlander to commemorate the Texas Centennial. A second period of expansion in the 1960s and 1970s established several of the university's current campus footprint with more than twenty instructional and administrative buildings. The first system Chancellor, Ann Stuart, was named in 1999 and grew enrollment by 85% and constructed new facilities for the growing kinesiology programs.

Carine M. Feyten was inaugurated as the second Chancellor and the 11th President of Texas Woman's University on November 10, 2014. The inaugural theme, “Moving Beyond the Inflection Point: Pioneers for a New Era,” expresses the optimism and determination of the university to reach even greater heights of achievement. Feyten has presided over a third period of significant student growth. Because of the corresponding need for significant facilities expansion, the university had to close down land it previously allowed the community to utilize as a public golf course. Another change was moving the student center from Brackenridge Hall (originally the site of the dorm of a same name) into Hubbard Hall, which had originally been built as the central campus dining facility by then President L.H. Hubbard to honor his wife, Bertha Altizer Hubbard.

The Denton campus also houses five residence halls, all of which are co-educational, including Guinn Hall, the tallest building in Denton.

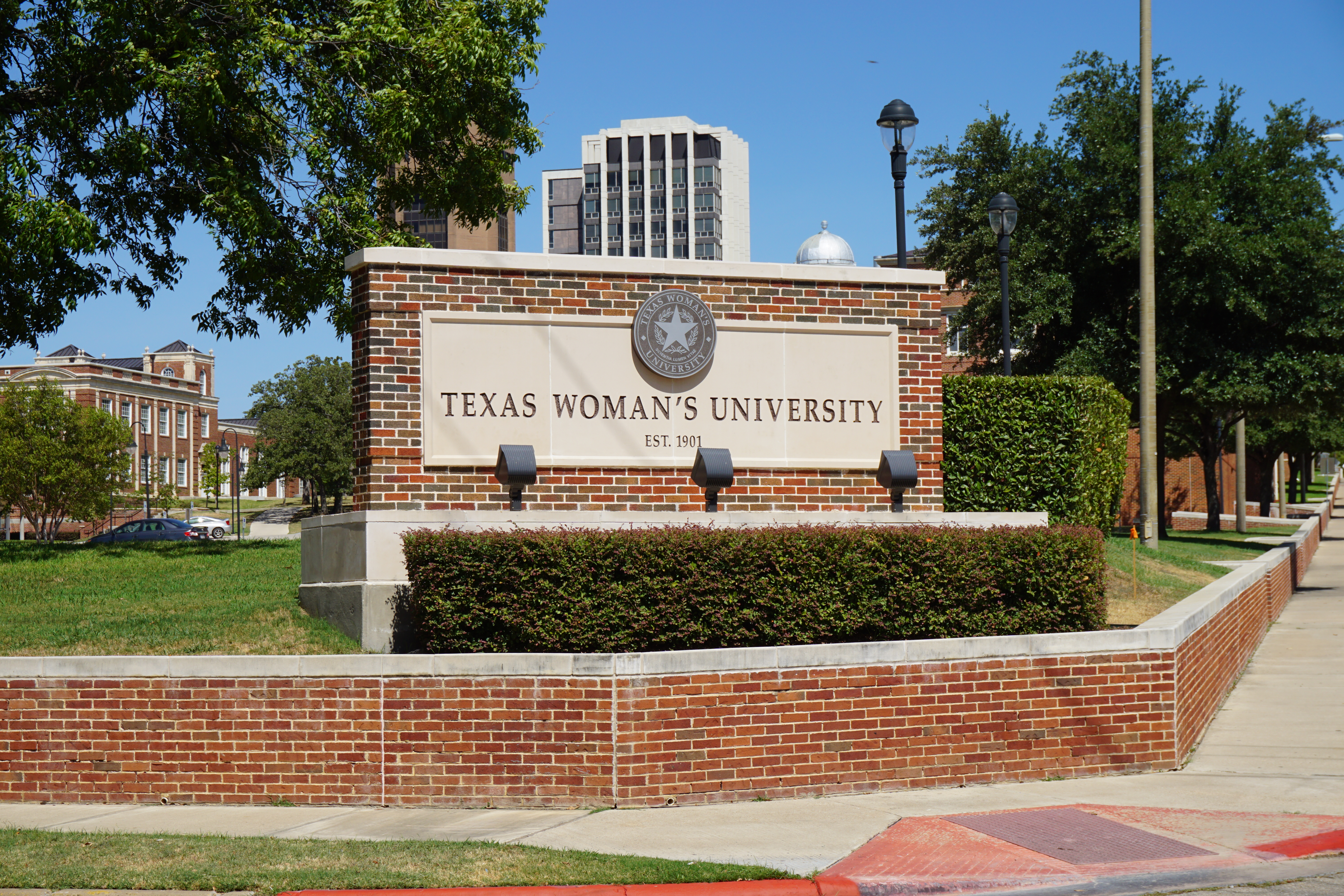
South Entrance

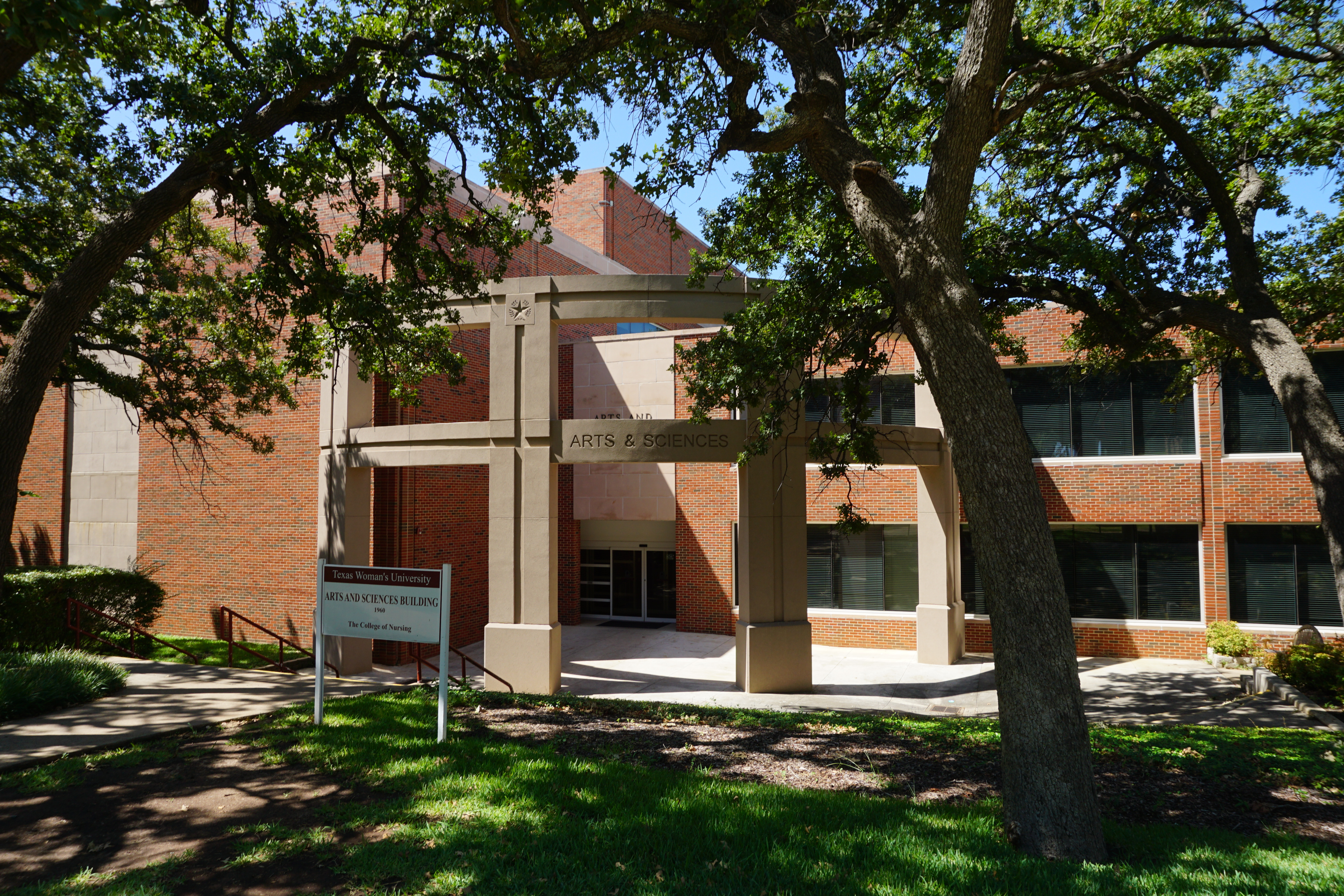
Arts and Sciences Building

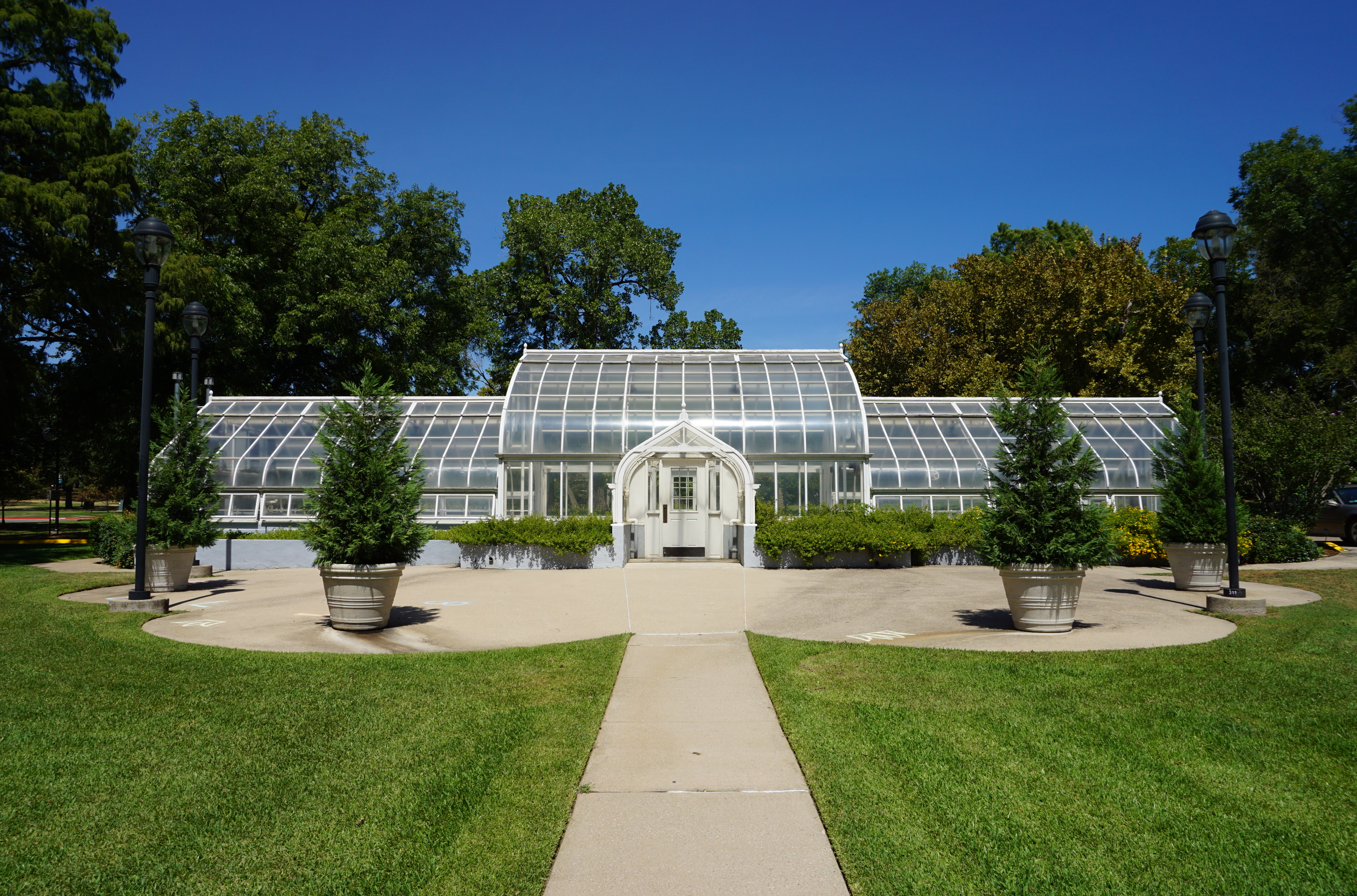
Greenhouse

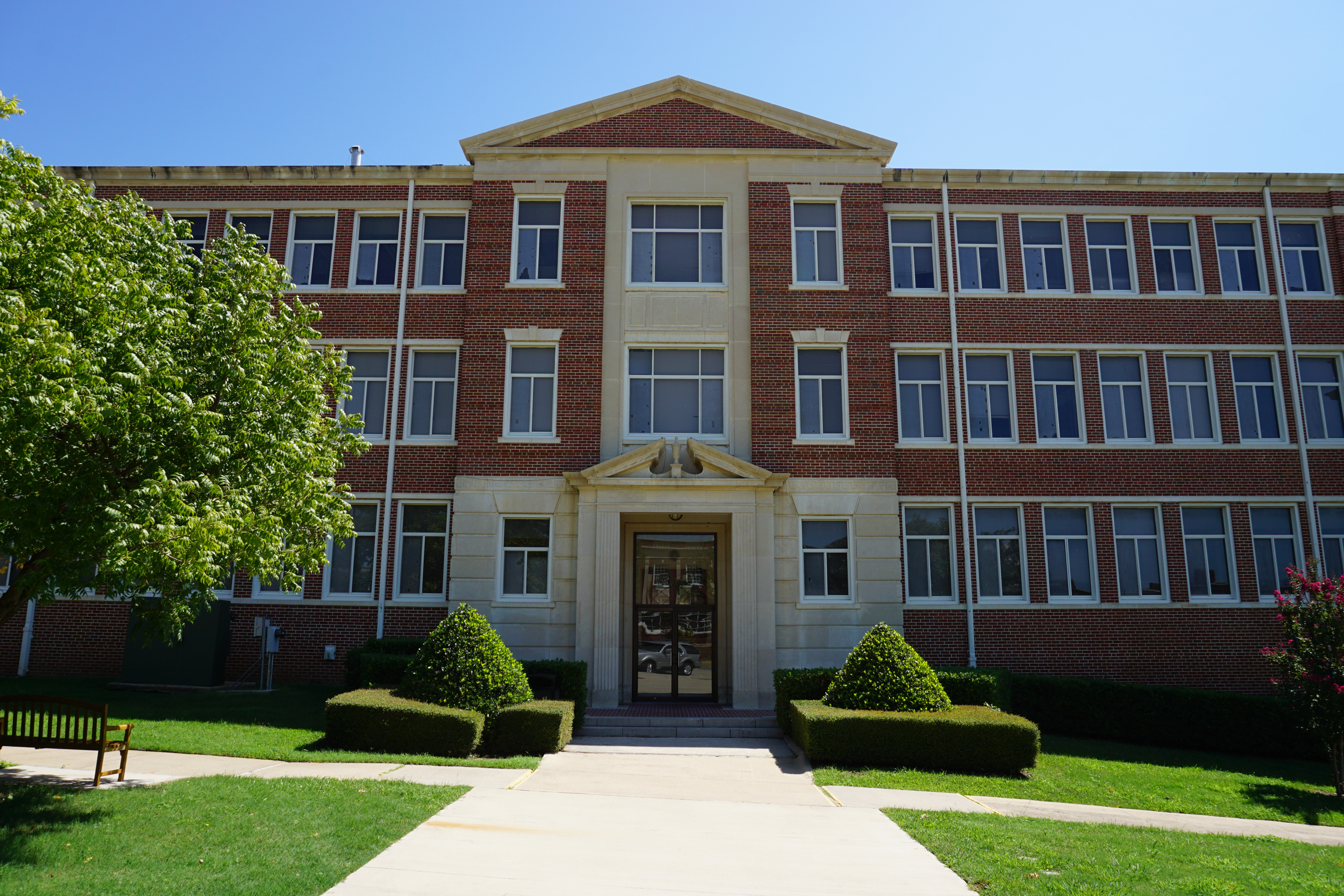
Woodcock Hall

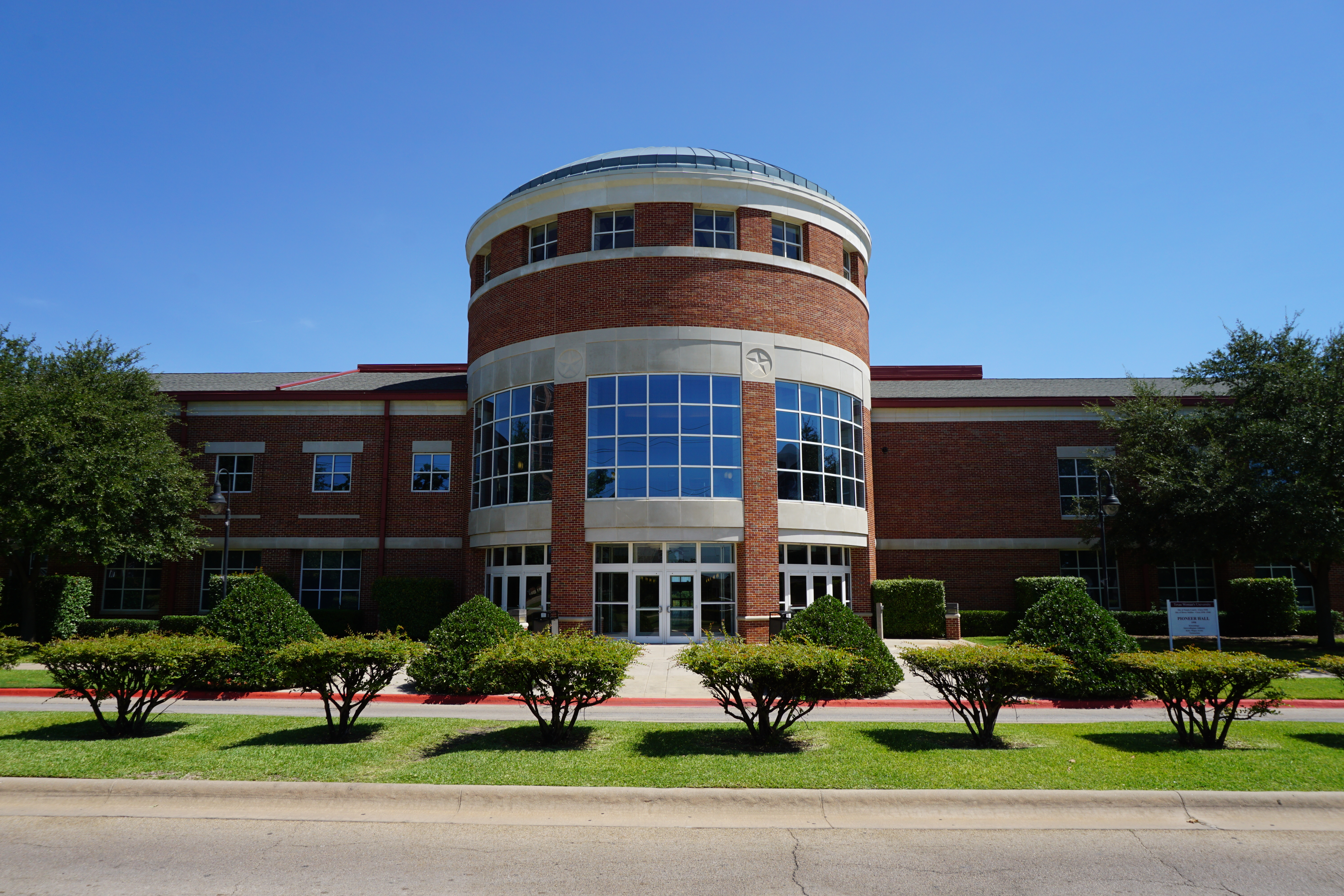
Pioneer Hall

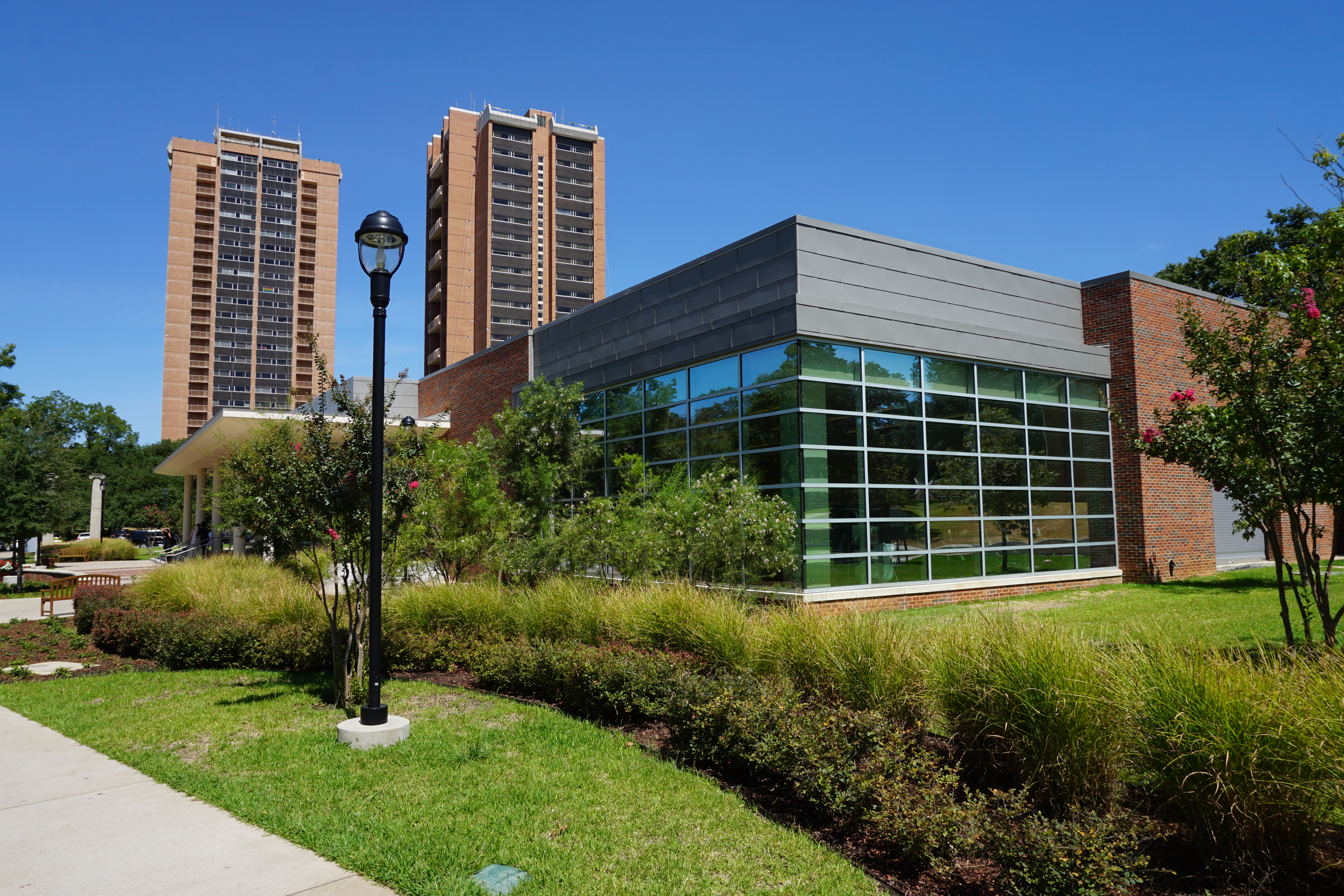
Fitness and Recreation Center

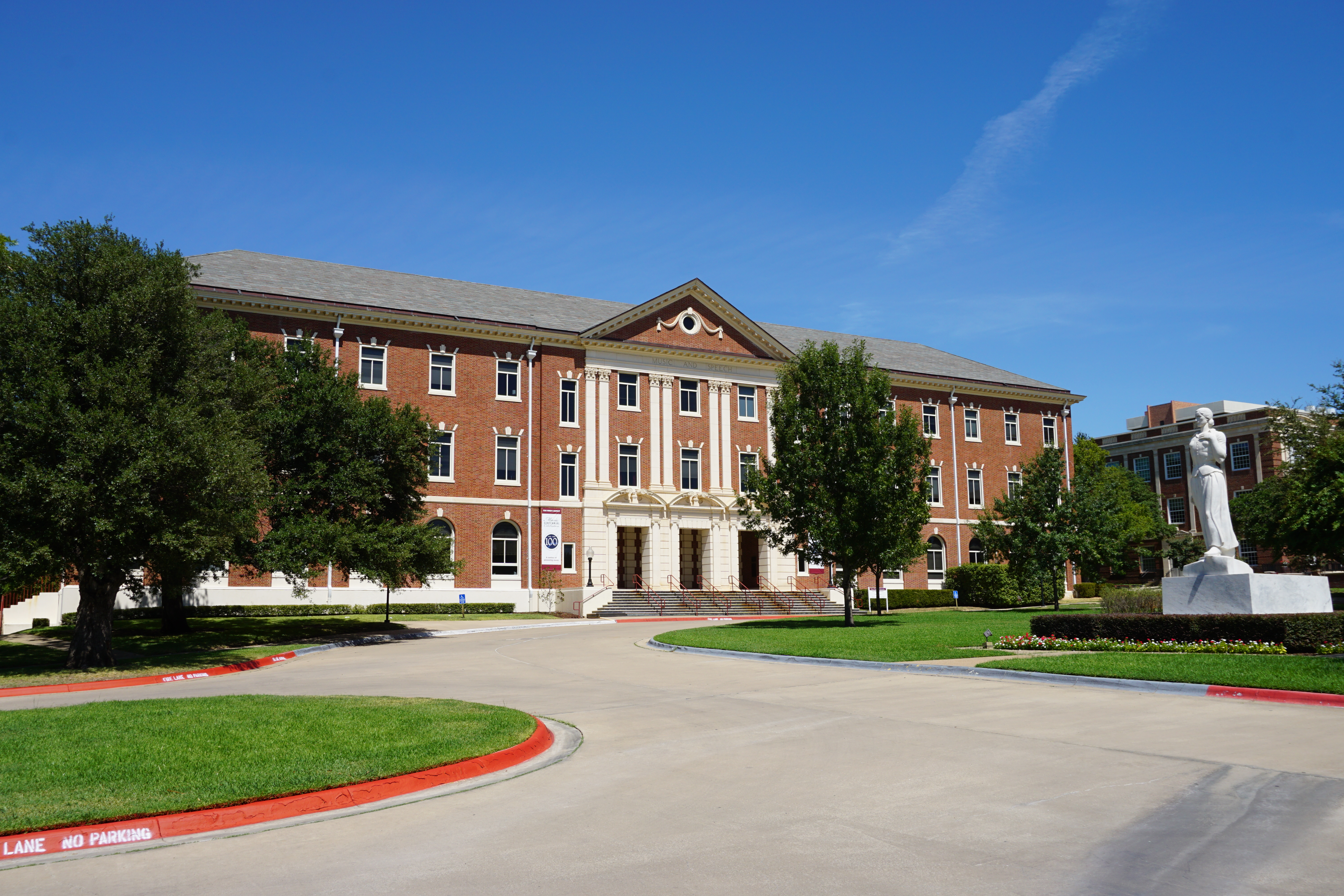
Visual Arts Building

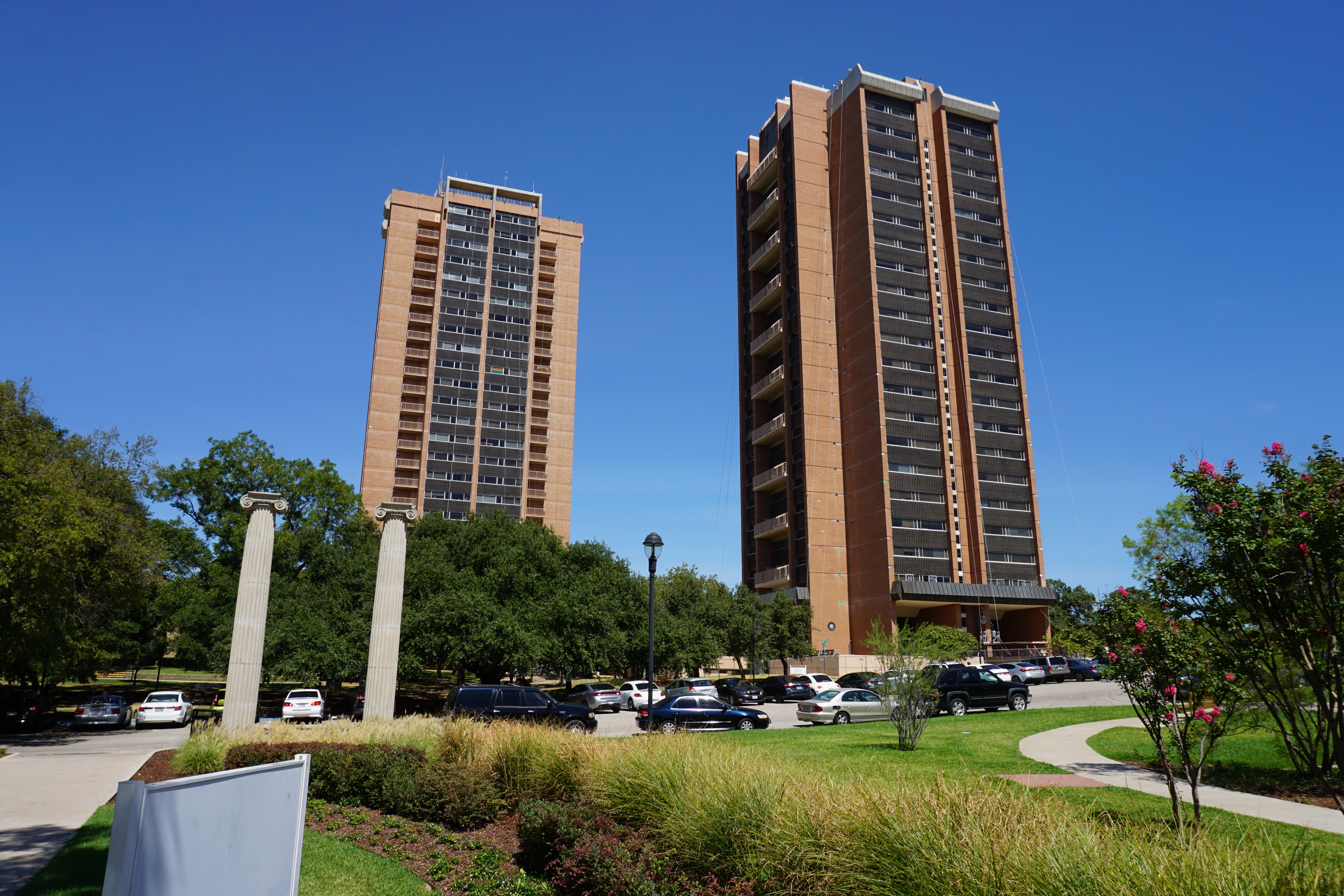
Guinn and Stark Hall

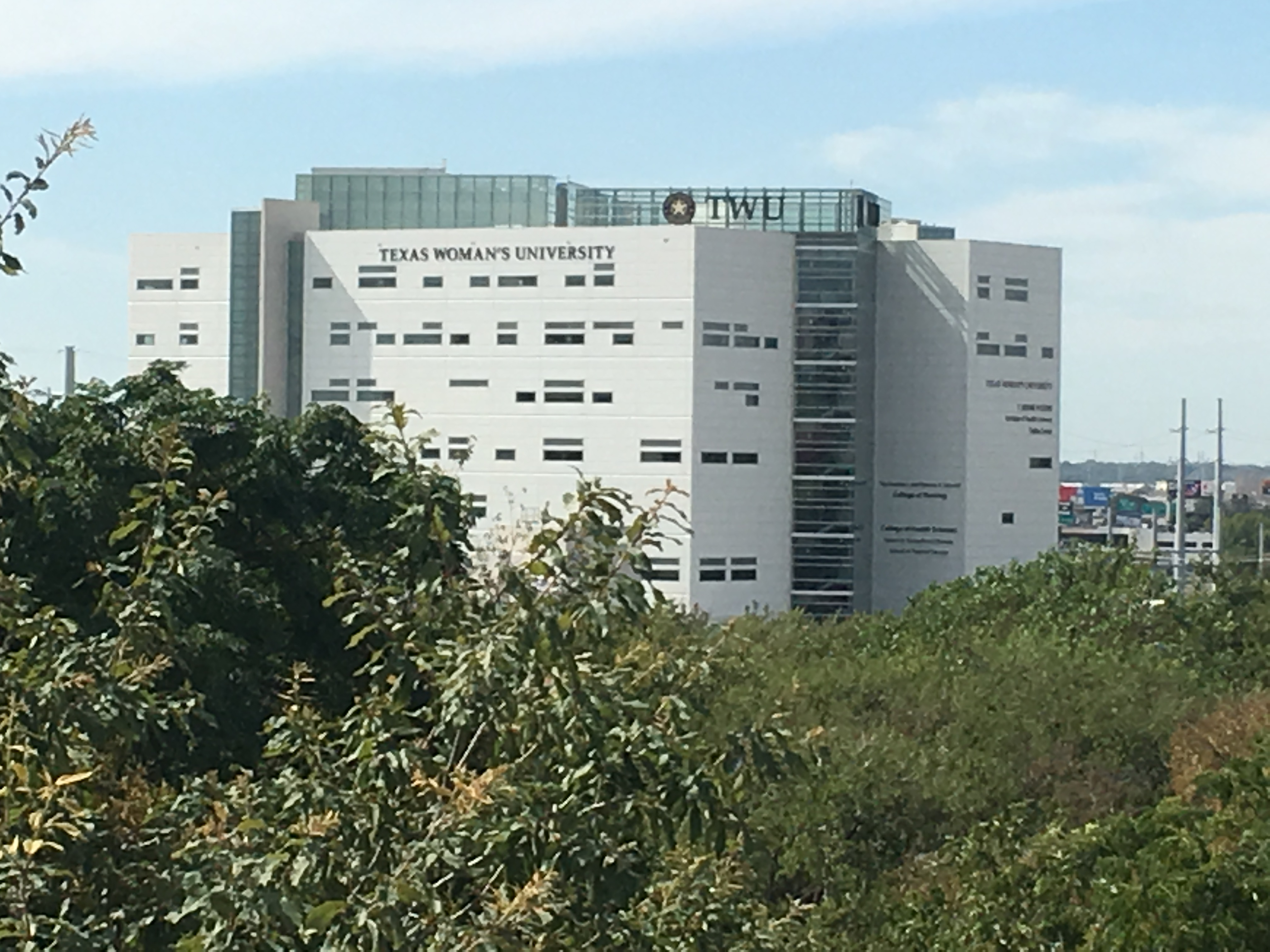
TWU's Dallas campus at the Southwestern Medical District

==== Little Chapel in the Woods ====
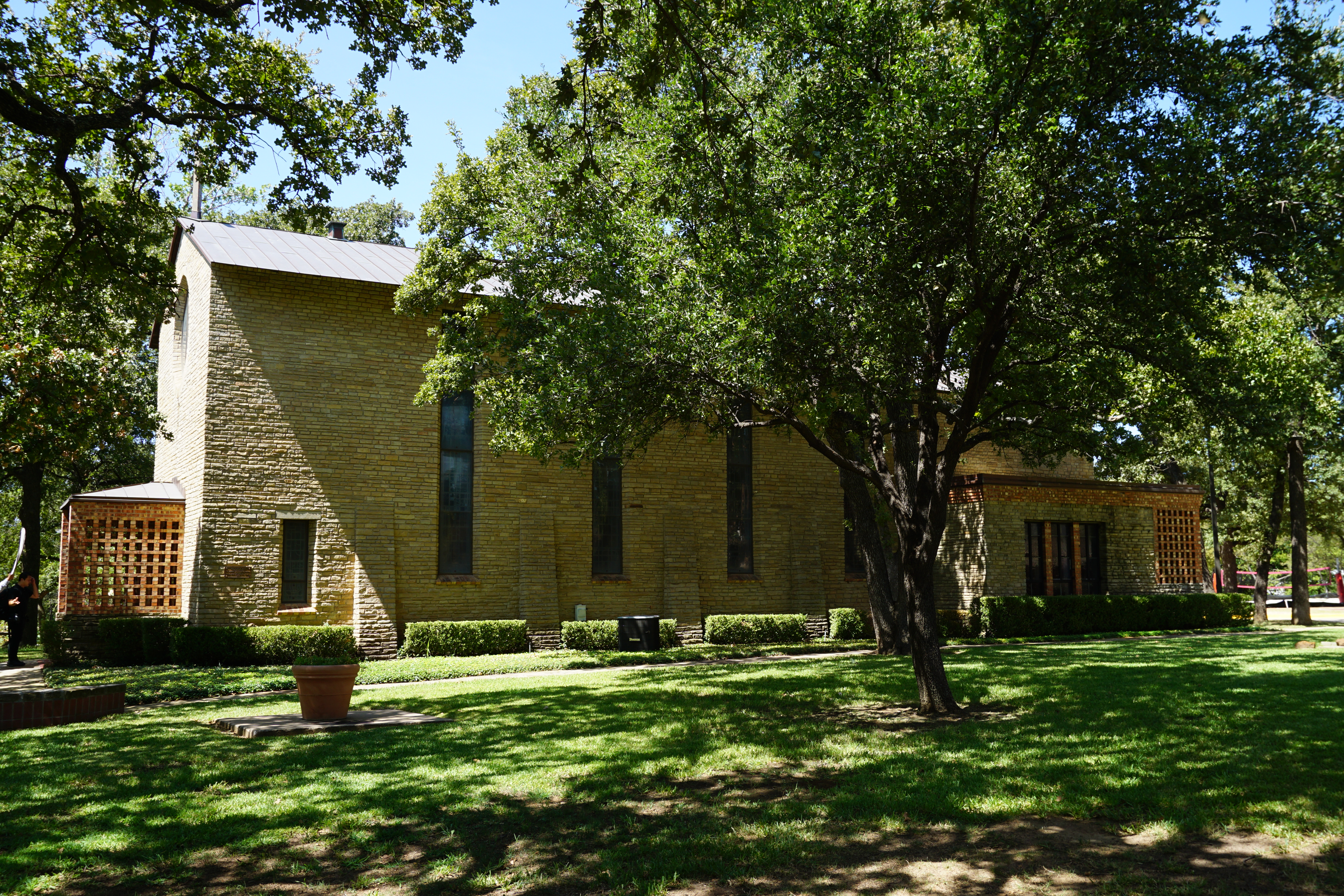
Little Chapel in the Woods

Built in 1939 and dedicated by First Lady Eleanor Roosevelt, the Little Chapel in the Woods has been named one of Texas' most outstanding architectural achievements by the Texas Society of Architects. Designed by leading American architect and Denton resident O'Neill Ford, recruits from the National Youth Administration constructed the building, while more than 300 students in the college's fine arts programs designed and created the building's artwork, including the stained glass windows, lighting, woodwork, doors, ceiling beams, and flooring. The stained glass windows depict scenes of "Women Ministering to Human Needs" including nursing, teaching, speech, literature, service, dance, and music. The chapel is open to the public daily and remains a popular destination for recitals, baptisms, and weddings. The original bridal book contains thousands of names of couples who were married between 1939 and 1979 and is currently on display at the Blagg-Huey Library.

==== Texas Women's Hall of Fame ====
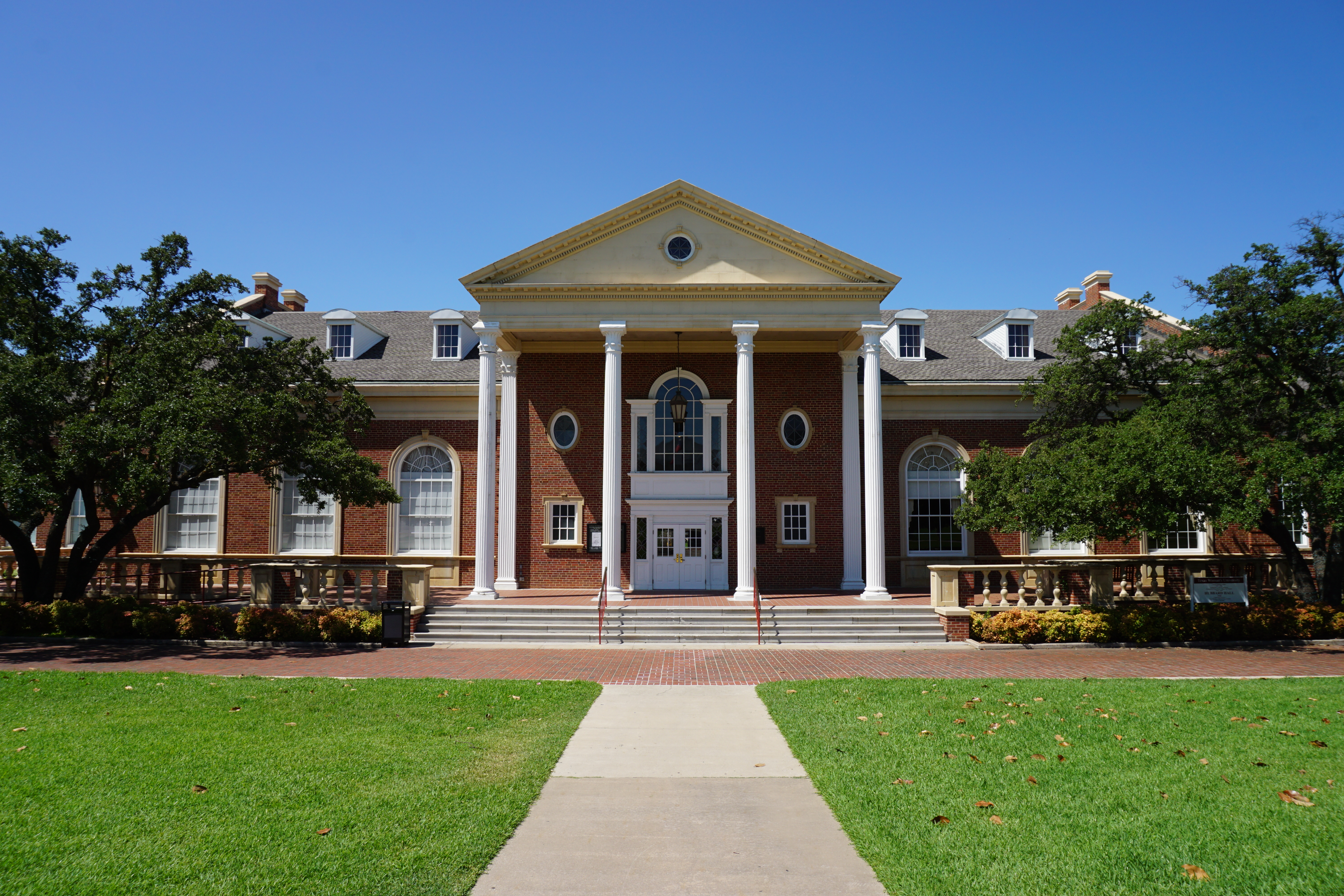
Hubbard Hall

Hubbard Hall, the former central dining facility, housed the Texas Women's Hall of Fame from 1984 until 2018. It is now on the 2nd floor of the Blagg-Huey Library. Created in 1984 by the Texas Governor's Commission on Women, the state-established exhibit honors Texas women who make significant public contributions to the state. Inductees include Supreme Court Associate Justice Sandra Day O'Connor, First Ladies Barbara Bush and Lady Bird Johnson, Governor Ann Richards, Texas First Lady Anita Perry, Congresswoman Barbara Jordan, Secretary of Health, Education and Welfare Oveta Culp Hobby, Olympic gold medalist Sheryl Swoopes, astronauts Mae Jemison and Sally Ride, entertainer Selena Quintanilla-Perez, and businesswoman Mary Kay Ash.

==== Texas First Ladies Historic Costume Collection ====
Established in 1940, the historic costume collection contains original dresses predating Texas statehood by First Ladies of the Texas Republic, as well as those worn by Texas First Ladies to the Governor's Inaugural Ball and gowns donated by Presidential First Ladies Mamie Eisenhower, Lady Bird Johnson, Barbara Bush, and Laura Bush. As of 2018, the collection consists of 47 gowns, of which 21 are on a rotating display in the Administration Conference Tower. Each dress has been loaned or donated by various sources to the university, with most dresses and their preservation costs through donations from Texas chapters of Daughters of the American Revolution, the Denton Benefit League, or directly from the First Ladies themselves.

=== Health Sciences campuses ===
The T. Boone Pickens Institute of Health Sciences in Dallas is based in the Southwestern Medical District, which also houses Parkland Hospital, Children's Medical Center Dallas, and the University of Texas Southwestern Medical Center. The nursing program began on what is now the Dallas campus. It additionally houses programs in occupational therapy, physical therapy and an MBA. Both a general MBA and a concentration specifically focused on health care are offered. On January 18, 2024, Monica Christopher was named the inaugural president of the Dallas campus, replacing the campus manager.

The Houston Campus is in the heart of the Texas Medical Center district, near the University of Texas MD Anderson Cancer Center and Texas Children's Hospital. It contains TWU's Nursing, Occupational Therapy, Physical Therapy, Nutrition & Food Sciences, Health Care Administration, and MBA programs. Monica Williams became the inaugural Houston Campus president on August 26, 2024.

== Academics ==
Academic rankings

National
- Forbes: 384
- U.S. News & World Report: 329 (tie)
- Washington Monthly: 163
- WSJ/College Pulse: 223

With more than 500 full-time faculty, approximately 75% of classes have 30 students or fewer. Nationally recognized programs include those in nursing, multicultural and gender studies, library science and information studies, and occupational therapy. The university is divided into six colleges:

1. College of Arts and Sciences provides the bulk of undergraduate instruction and presently is subdivided into Social Sciences and Historical Studies; Language, Culture, and Gender Studies, School of the Arts and Design, School of the Sciences, School of Social Work, Psychology and Philosophy; and General Studies
2. College of Business offers undergraduate programs in accounting, business, business administration, finance, human resource management, management, and marketing, and graduate programs in business administration, healthcare administration, and health systems management.
3. College of Health Sciences is supported at the Denton, Houston, and Dallas campuses and includes the Schools of Occupational Therapy and Physical Therapy, the School of Health Promotion and Kinesiology, the Department of Communication Sciences and Oral Health, and the Department of Nutrition & Food Sciences.
4. College of Nursing was established in 1954, growing to become the second-largest in Texas and one of the largest in the country, offering programs at the baccalaureate, master's, and doctoral level. Its doctoral program is the fifth oldest in the United States and remains the largest in the world. In addition to the Bachelor of Science program for students with no prior degree, the college offers a weekend program for students who already have a bachelor's degree; the college also has a Registered Nurse to Baccalaureate program (RN to BSN) and a Registered Nurse to Master's Program (RN to MS). With campuses in Houston and Dallas, admission is very competitive with the cut-off GPA frequently at 4.0.
5. College of Professional Education encompasses Teacher Education, Human Development, Family Studies, and Counseling Literacy and Learning, and the School of Library and Information Studies.
6. Graduate School functions as a distinct university component. The Graduate School processes graduate admissions to the university and subsequent academic affairs, including degrees in a variety of programs.

=== The Woman's Collection ===
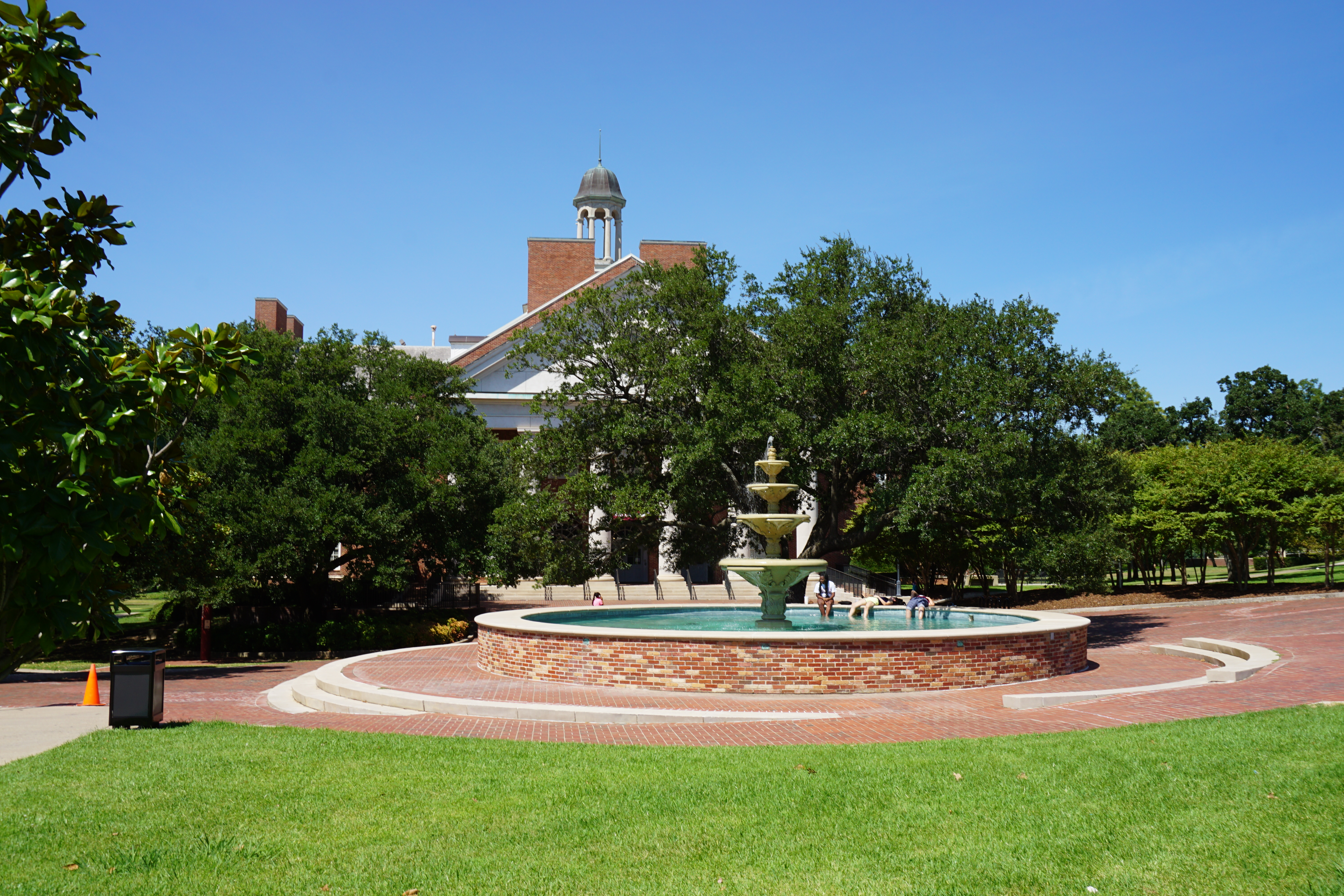
Mary Evelyn Blagg-Huey Library

The second floor of Blagg-Huey Library houses the Woman's Collection. Established in 1932 at the suggestion of then-college president L.H. Hubbard, the collection is one of the largest and oldest collections of materials about American women's history in the United States. In 1979, it was designated by the Texas legislature to house the official history of women in the state.

Currently, the Woman's Collection features one of the largest repositories of women in aviation in the world, housing the official collections of Women Airforce Service Pilots of World War II, the Whirly-Girls International Helicopter Pilots, Women Military Aviators, Association of Women Airline Mechanics, International Society of Women Airline Pilots, and the Air Race Classic, as well as many of its individual members' collections. Other major archives include the Culinary History and Cookbook Collections, which showcase culinary arts from around the world, and is one of the largest collections in the United States with more than 60,000 books, pamphlets, and menus; the Texas Women's Hall of Fame established by the Texas Governor's Commission on Women; and the university's archives.

The Woman's Collection is also the official repository for hundreds of organizations, agencies, and conferences in Texas and the southwest concerned with women's rights, agency, and status. It is currently the official archive for the Texas Federation of Women's Clubs, Texas Association of Women's Clubs (formerly Texas Federation of Colored Women's Clubs), Philanthropic Educational Organization, Texas Federation of Business and Professional Women, and the Texas chapters of the American Association of University Women and Delta Kappa Gamma, as well as the permanent home for 1981 exhibit about Texas women's history produced by the Texas Foundation for Women's Resources.

Individual collection highlights include Hilda Gloria Tagle, the first Latina federal judge; Dora Dougherty Strother, aviation psychologist, engineer, and the first woman to fly the B-29 Superfortress; Sarah Weddington, the lead counsel in Roe v. Wade, a three-term legislator in the Texas House of Representatives, and an advisor to President Carter who had also regularly taught/lectured at Texas Woman's University; and Jean Ross Howard Phelan, aviation lobbyist and founder of the Whirly-Girls.

=== Centers ===
The Institute for Women's Health, launched in 1993 as the Center for Research on Women's Health, focuses on the health of women and girls in Texas through partnerships with other academic institutions, government agencies, and community organizations. Its programming includes exercise, sports, and nutrition services to students, as well as the greater Denton and Houston communities.

The Jane Nelson Institute for Women's Leadership was established in 2018 as a hub to educate Texans, especially young women and girls, about women about leadership, business, politics, and public life. It houses:

- the Center for Women in Government, previously known as the Center for Women in Politics and Public Policy.
- the Center for Women Entrepreneurs, launched in 2015, to help create and nurture women-owned businesses in the state through business advising, funding, networking, training, and resources. Its programming specializes in woman-owned businesses, startups, rural businesses, and veteran-owned enterprises. It also offers certification programs to qualify as a minority-owned business, including historically disadvantaged populations, underutilized zones, LGBT-owned, service-disabled veteran-owned, veteran woman-owned, and woman-owned.
- the Center for Student Leadership, which coordinates educational programs, professional development opportunities, and scholarships

== Student life ==
Undergraduate demographics as of Fall 2023
Race and ethnicity	Total
Hispanic	38%
White	27%
Black	19%
Asian	9%
Two or more races	4%
International student	1%
Unknown	1%
Economic diversity
Low-income (Note: The percentage of students who received an income-based federal Pell grant intended for low-income students.)	45%
Affluent (Note: The percentage of students who are a part of the American middle class at the bare minimum.)	55%

=== Student media ===
In print since 1914, The Lasso is a student-produced weekly newspaper. The Lasso began as a daily and switched to a weekly format in the 1990s, adding an online version in 2003. Notable past editors include Pulitzer Prize-winner Caro Crawford Brown.

A magazine, The Dadaelian, was published monthly by students in the Elocution, Physical Culture and Vocal Music department in 1906 to highlight student-created prose, poetry, and visual art; it switched to a quarterly format in 1914. It is published online as a literary journal featuring short stories, artwork, photography, and poetry.

=== Greek life ===
Approximately three percent of undergraduate women are active in a sorority on campus. Approximately two percent of undergraduate men are active in a fraternity on campus.

== Athletics ==
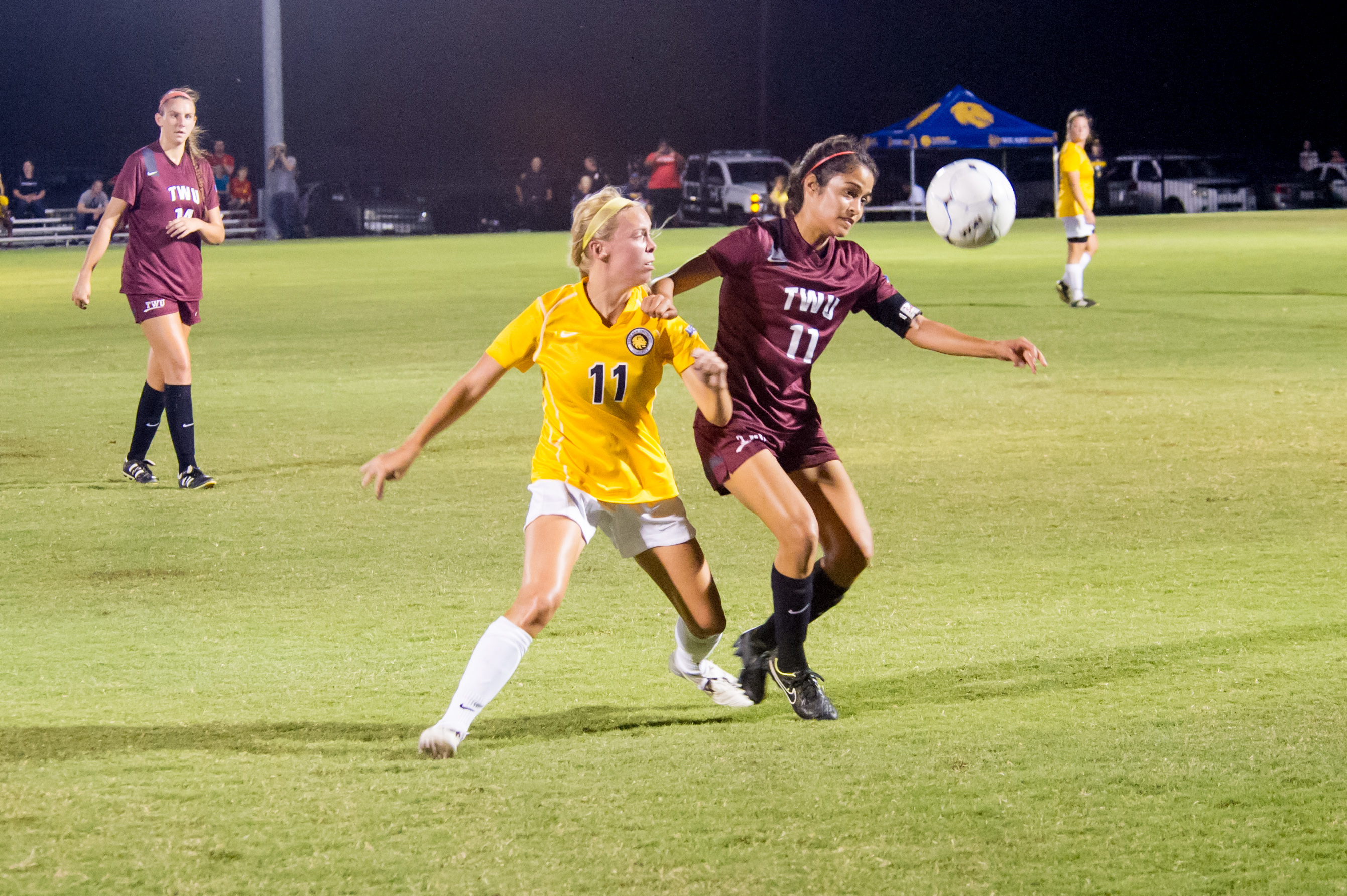
The Pioneers soccer team in action against the Texas A&M–Commerce Lions in 2014

The university originally offered sports through the Women's Recreation Association, joining the Commission on Intercollegiate Athletics for Women in 1969 in seven sports: basketball, volleyball, field hockey, tennis, badminton, swimming, and track. Known as the "Tessies," the school won its first national title at the CIAW National Intercollegiate Track and Field Championship that same year.

In 1979, TWU became the Pioneers; after the CIAW ceased operations in 1982, the university officially joined the NCAA Division II. The Pioneers currently compete in the Lone Star Conference, but only in women's sports; the gymnastics team competes in the Division I Midwest Independent Conference. Current competitive programs include:

- Basketball
- Dance
- Soccer
- Volleyball
- Softball
- Gymnastics

Newly approved programs include:

- STUNT
- Synchronized swimming
- Wrestling

=== Awards ===
Established in 1972, the TWU Gymnastics squad has won the USA Gymnastics Collegiate National Championships with a record eleven team championships since 1993, with the most recent championships coming back to back in 2017 and 2018.

In 2014, the athletics program was awarded the inaugural Lone Star Conference Women's Academic Excellence Award, given to the member institution with the highest team G.P.A. As of 2015, the Pioneers have a 65-semester (more than thirty years) of posting a department G.P.A. of 3.0 or higher by all student-athletes.

== Notable alumni ==
- Claire Myers Owens (B.A. 1916), author
- Berenice Mallory (B.A. 1923), home economics professor, federal official
- Caro Crawford Brown (B.A. 1925), winner of Pulitzer Prize for local reporting in 1955 for the Alice (Texas) Daily Echo
- Vara Martin Daniel, educator and former First Lady of Guam
- Margaret Virginia (Margo) Jones (B.A. 1932) and (M.A. 1933), pioneer in the American Resident Theater Movement and author of Theater In The Round; directed the world premiere of Inherit the Wind by Lawrence and Lee in Dallas in 1955
- Lou Halsell Rodenberger (B.S. 1943), scholar of Texas women authors, particularly Jane Gilmore Rushing
- Betty Heitman (B.A. 1949), co-chairwoman of the Republican National Committee from 1983 to 1987; distinguished TWU alumnus, 1980
- Elma González (B.S. 1965), plant cell biologist
- Joan Wall (M.M. 1969), mezzo-soprano and principal performer at the Metropolitan Opera Company of New York, the Deutsche Oper Berlin, and in Amsterdam, Boston, Philadelphia, and Fort Worth
- Mary L. Saunders (B.S. 1970), retired major general in the United States Air Force, first female director of Transportation in the USAF, and highest ranking African-American woman at the time
- Millie Hughes-Fulford (Ph.D. 1972), NASA astronaut who studied osteoporosis and flew aboard STS-40 Spacelab Life Sciences (SLS 1) in June 1991, the first Spacelab mission dedicated to biomedical studies; first civilian scientist on a space mission
- Elizabeth Ann Nalley (Ph.D. 1975), former president of the American Chemical Society
- Huda Salih Mahdi Ammash (M.S. 1979), a.k.a. Mrs. Anthrax, studied microbiology and went on to become a high-ranking Iraqi scientist; after surrendering herself in the 2003 invasion of Iraq, she was later deemed not a security threat and was released in 2005
- Louise Ritter (B.S. 1982), won the 1988 Olympic gold medal in the women's high jump
- Alia Moses, a.k.a. Alia M. Ludlum, (B.A. 1983), serves as district judge for the United States District Court for the Western District of Texas
- Juan L. Maldonado (Ph.D. 1986), president of Laredo Community College, 2007–2016
- Shirley Cothran Barrett (Ph.D.), served as Miss America in 1975
- Donna Campbell (M.S.N), member of the Texas Senate and an emergency room physician from New Braunfels
- Sylvia Garcia (B.A. 1972), social worker and Texas legislator
- Alma Dawson (Ph.D. 1996), Russell B. Long Professor of Library and Information Science at Louisiana State University
- Jill Marie Jones (B.A. 1999), actress, most recognizable role as "Toni Childs" for six seasons in Girlfriends
- Carly Patterson (B.S. 2014), won the 2004 Olympic gold medal in the women's gymnastics individual all-around, silver in individual balance beam, and silver in team competition

== Notable faculty ==
- Mary Eleanor Brackenridge (1837–1924), founding university regent, suffragist, and community organizer
- Carlotta Corpron (1901–1988), professor of photography, design, and art history
- Toni LaSelle (1901–2002), instructor and professor in Art History and Studio Arts; developed the Art History program at TWU
- Pauline Gracia Beery Mack (1891–1974), professor and dean of the College of Household Arts and Sciences; noted chemist and nutritionist; first woman to receive the NASA Silver Snoopy award
- Sarah Weddington (1945–2021), lecturer in History and Political Science; argued Roe v. Wade before the United States Supreme Court; White House Director of Political Affairs for President Jimmy Carter 1979–1981
- Autrey Nell Wiley (1901–1990), B.A. 1922; professor and chair; American literary critic

== See also ==
- Little Chapel in the Woods
- Texas Women's Hall of Fame
- Pioneer Woman (Friedlander)
- Ewha Womans University
- Texas University
