= Johnny's Such a Bright Boy, what a Shame He's Retarded =

1977 book by Kate Long

Johnny's Such a Bright Boy, what a Shame He's Retarded: In Support of Mainstreaming in Public Schools
- first edition
- Authors: Kate Long
- Language: English
- Publisher: Houghton Mifflin
- Publication date: 1977
- Publication place: United States
- Media type: Print
- Pages: 361
- ISBN: 9780395253465
- Dewey Decimal: 371.9/0973
- LC Class: LC4031 .L66

Johnny's Such a Bright Boy, what a Shame He's Retarded: In Support of Mainstreaming in Public Schools is a 1977 fictionalized psychology book by Kate Long, advocating for the implementation of developmentally disabled children into the mainstream public school system in the United States. The book was the winner of the Delta Kappa Gamma Society Internationals Educators' Award for 1978. The original 1977 edition was an apple-green hardcover, while the more common mass-market paperback, released in 1978, was mustard-yellow and featured an image of a smiling child on it.

== Reception ==
Johnny's Such a Bright Boy, what a Shame He's Retarded received largely positive reviews from critics. Dava Grayson of Journal of Visual Impairment & Blindness noted that the book's points were "generally valid" and that the book was timely for an era where mainstreaming disabled students into public schools was a top priority in the American education system. Kirkus Reviews agreed, stating, "the fictionalized approach enables Long - who was a special ed supervisor - to explore the issues and dramatize them in human terms, avoiding too-sharp contrasts without obscuring her position. A personalized exposition from a strong advocate."
