= Helgadóttir =

Helgadóttir is an Icelandic surname meaning daughter of Helgi. Notable people with the surname include:

- Ásta Guðrún Helgadóttir (born 5 February 1990), former member of parliament
- Ásthildur Helgadóttir (born 1976), Icelandic footballer
- Gerður Helgadóttir (1928–1975), Icelandic sculptor and artist
- Guðrún Helgadóttir (born 1935), Icelandic writer
- Guðrún P. Helgadóttir (1922–2005), Icelandic writer, poet, scholar and educator
- Heiða Kristín Helgadóttir (born 1983), Icelandic politician and entrepreneur
- Helga Vala Helgadóttir (born 1972), Icelandic politician
- Ragnhildur Helgadóttir (1930–2016), Icelandic politician
- Þóra Björg Helgadóttir (born 1981), Icelandic footballer
