= Mae Shumate Belcher =

American politician and educator (1904–1999)

West Virginia House of Delegates
- In office 1959–1960
- In office 1963–1964

Personal details
- Born: Mae Shumate; April 14, 1904 Saulsville, West Virginia, US
- Died: August 8, 1999 (aged 95) Pineville, West Virginia, US
- Resting place: Blue Ridge Memorial Gardens, Beckley, West Virginia, US
- Education: Concord College, B.A., 1943; West Virginia University, MEd., 1950
- Profession: Educator, education administrator

Mae Shumate Belcher (April 14, 1904 – August 8, 1999) was an American politician, educator, and education administrator. She was the first woman elected to the West Virginia House of Delegates, serving two terms.

== Early life and education ==
Belcher was born in Saulsville, West Virginia, on April 14, 1904. She was the daughter of Elien Acord Schumant and William Riley Shumate, a farmer, merchant, and teacher. She had three brothers and three sisters.

She attended the one-room Low Gap School. She was a member of the first class of Milam High School in McGraws, West Virginia. While there, she played on the women's basketball team, joining her teammates in riding to games on horseback. She graduated from Athens High School in Athens, West Virginia in 1923.

She received a teaching certification from Concord College. After starting work as a classroom teacher, she attended summer school at Concord College, receiving a Bachelor's degree in 1943. She also attended summer school at New River State College, Duke University, Marshall College, and Columbia University. In 1950, she received a Master's degree, principal's certificate and supervisor's certificate from West Virginia University.

== Career ==
Belcher a school teacher and principal. In September 1945, she became the assistant superintendent of the Wyoming County Schools, later becoming the superintendent. She was a member of the executive committee of the West Virginia Association of School Superintendents, president of the Wyoming County Classroom Teachers Association, and president of the Southern Area Supervisors Association. She was a charter member and president of the Zeta chapter of Delta Kappa Gamma honorary society for women educators. She was a member of the National Education Association. She resigned from her position as assistant superintendent in July 1958, after 35 years in education.

In 1958, she ran for the West Virginia House of Delegates as a Democrat, becoming the first woman elected to that entity. She served two terms, from 1959 to 1960 and 1963 to 1964. She ran for offices as a Democrat.

== Personal life ==
She married Wirt Cassious Belcher in 1925. He was a graduate of Milam High School, Concord College, and West Virginia University and taught in the Wyoming County School System.

Belecher was elected to the first class of the Milam High School Hall of Fame and to the Glen Rogers High School Hall of Fame. She attended the coronation of Elizabeth II in 1953.

Belecher chaired the Wyoming County chapter of the Red Cross and the Wyoming County Save the Children Federation. She served on the board of directors of the Wyoming County Sheltered Workshop, the Beckley Child Care Center Auxiliary, and the Milan High School Alumni Association. She was also a charter member and regent of the Lt. Daniel Shumate Chapter of the Daughters of the American Revolution. She belonged to the Pineville First United Methodist Church where she was president of the United Methodist Women.

After a long illness, Belcher died in her home in Pineville, West Virginia on August 6, 1999, at the age of 95 years. She was buried in Blue Ridge Memorial Gardens mausoleum in Beckley, West Virginia. After her death, her husband established the Wirt C. and Mae S. Belcher Endowment Fund at West Virginia University.
