= Senator Ferguson (disambiguation) =

Homer S. Ferguson (1889–1982), U.S. Senator from Michigan from 1943 to 1955. Senator Ferguson may also refer to:

- Benjamin Ferguson (Wisconsin politician) (1820–1888), Wisconsin State Senate
- Bill Ferguson (politician) (born 1983), Maryland State Senate
- Frank R. Ferguson (1939–2003), Alaska State Senate
- Robert E. Ferguson (1924–2016), New Mexico State Senate
- Sue Ramsey Johnston Ferguson (1897–1977), North Carolina State Senate
- Timothy R. Ferguson (born 1955), Maryland State Senate
- Virgil Ferguson (1844–1912), Illinois State Senate
