= List of Delta Kappa Gamma chapters =

Delta Kappa Gamma is an international professional honor society for women educators. It was established in 1929 at the University of Texas at Austin. As of 2025, the society has chapters in eighteen countries. The society is organized by state chapters that oversee local chapters in their area.

== State organizations ==
The national society is divided into administrative state organizations or chapters. As the society expanded beyond the United States, the state organizations expanded to include provinces, territories, and comparable political divisions. State organizations are named in Greek alphabet order in as they were founded or by the name of their country.

Following is an incomplete list of state organizations with active chapters are indicated in bold and inactive chapters are in italics.

Chapter	Former name	Charter date and range	Status	Ref.
**Texas**	Alpha State	May 11, 1929	Active	
**Alabama**	Beta State	December 19, 1931	Active	
**Oklahoma**	Gamma State	April 16, 1932	Active	
**Missouri**	Delta State	May 27, 1933	Active	
**Louisiana**	Epsilon State	March 17, 1934	Active	
**Mississippi**	Zeta State	April 21, 1934	Active	
**North Carolina**	Eta State	October 27, 1934	Active	
**New Mexico**	Theta State	November 2, 1934	Active	
**Virginia**	Iota State	November 29, 1934	Active	
**Arkansas**	Kappa	March 8, 1935	Active	
**Illinois**	Lambda State	March 16, 1935	Active	
**Florida**	Mu State	1935	Active	
District of Columbia	Nu State	November 27, 1935	Inactive	
**Tennessee**	Xi State	November 30, 1935	Active	
**Arizona**	Omicron State	January 25, 1936	Active	
**New York**	Pi State	April 18, 1936	Active	
**Nebraska**	Rho State	April 25, 1936	Active	
**Wisconsin**	Sigma State	May 14, 1936	Active	
**Minnesota**	Tau State	May 15, 1936	Active	
**Iowa**	Upsilon State		Active	
**Kansas**	Phi State	October 17, 1936	Active	
**California**	Chi State		Active	
**Georgia**	Psi State	November 28, 1936	Active	
**Colorado**	Omega State		Active	
**Pennsylvania**	Alpha Alpha State	January 23, 1937	Active	
**Maryland**	Alpha Beta State	January 30, 1937	Active	
**Kentucky**	Alpha Gamma State	March 24, 1937	Active	
**Ohio**	Alpha Delta State	1938	Active	
**Indiana**	Alpha Epsilon State		Active	
**New Jersey**	Alpha Zeta State	February 2, 1938	Active	
**South Carolina**	Alpha Eta State		Active	
**Utah**	Alpha Theta State		Active	
**Michigan**	Alpha Iota State		Active	
**Connecticut**	Alpha Kappa State	May 12, 1939	Active	
**Vermont**	Alpha Lambda State	May 13, 1939	Active	
**Montana**	Alpha Mu State	April 13, 1940	Active	
**Idaho**	Alpha Nu State	April 18, 1940	Active	
**Wyoming**	Alpha Xi State		Active	
**North Dakota**	Alpha Omicron State		Active	
**South Dakota**	Alpha Pi State	1940	Active	
**Oregon**	Alpha Rho State	May 23, 1941	Active	
**Washington**	Alpha Sigma State	May 24, 1941	Active	
**Delaware**	Alpha Tau State	1941	Active	
**Massachusetts**	Alpha Upsilon State	June 30, 1941	Active	
**West Virginia**	Alpha Phi State	November 1, 1941	Active	
**Nevada**	Alpha Chi State		Active	
**Maine**	Alpha Psi State	September 19, 1942	Active	
**New Hampshire**	Beta Alpha State		Active	
**Hawai'i**	Beta Beta State	January 21, 1949	Active	
**British Columbia**	Alpha Province	June 7, 1952	Active	
**Ontario**	Beta Province	June 20, 1953	Active	
**Alaska**	Beta Gamma State	October 15, 1955	Active	
**Quebec**	Gamma Province	June 18, 1956	Active	
**New Brunswick**	Delta Province	October 20, 1956	Active	
**Manitoba**	Epsilon Province	June 25, 1958	Active	
**Alberta**	Zeta Province	May 3, 1960	Active	
**Norway**		April 3, 1970	Active	
**Sweden**		April 25, 1972	Active	
**Finland**		March 29, 1974	Active	
**Iceland (IS)**		November 7, 1975	Active	
**The Netherlands**		March 31, 1976	Active	
**Saskatchewan**	Eta Province	June 5, 1976	Active	
**Great Britain**		November 19, 1977	Active	
**Nova Scotia**	Theta Province	November 19, 1983	Active	
**Prince Edward Island**	Iota Province	May 23, 1984	Active	
**Newfoundland**	Kappa Province	September 28, 1985	Active	
**Germany**		March 21, 1992	Active	
Denmark		March 23, 2007– 2015	Inactive	
**Estonia**		March 8, 2008	Active	
**Costa Rico**			Active	
El Salvador			Inactive	
**Guatemala**			Active	
**Japan**			Active	
Mexico			Inactive	
**Panama**			Active	

== Local chapters ==
Chapters are named in Greek letter order, within their state organization. Following is an incomplete list of Delta Kappa Gamma chapters, with active chapters indicated in bold and inactive chapters in italics.

Chapter	Charter date and range	Location	Status	Ref.
**TX Alpha**	June 3, 1929	Austin, Texas	Active	
**TX Beta**		San Antonio, Texas	Active	
TX Gamma	April 23, 1932	Wharton, Texas	Inactive	(Note: Chapter originally included Brazoria, Fort Bend, and Matagorda Counties.)
**TX Nu**	March 29, 1930	Hays County and Blanco County, Texas	Active	(Note: Blanco County joined this chapter in May 1948.)
**TX Rho**	May 16, 1930	Hidalgo County, Texas	Active	
**TX Phi**	April 18, 1931	Rusk County, Texas	Active	
**TX Alpha Mu**	May 7, 1932	Lower Cameron County, Texas	Active	
**TX Alpha Tau**	April 15, 1933	Kaufman County, Texas	Active	
**MO Alpha Iota**	May 27, 1933	Columbia, Missouri	Active	
**TX Alpha Chi**	March 10, 1934	Burnet County and Llano County, Texas	Active	
**TX Beta Zeta**	March 23, 1935	Fredericksburg, Texas	Active	
**TX Beta Eta**	1935	South Pasadena, Texas	Active	
**TX Beta Tau**	January 18, 1936	San Antonio, Texas	Active	
NC Alpha	April 17, 1936	Greensboro, North Carolina	Active	(Note: In 1966, NC Beta Delta formed from NC Alpha.)
**NC Beta** (see **Alpha Omicron**)	April 17, 1936	Raleigh and Wake County, North Carolina	Active	(Note: In 1958, the chapter divided to form NC Alpha Omicron.)
**NM Beta**	April 25, 1936	Sante Fe, New Mexico	Active	
**NM Gamma**	April 28, 1936	Albuquerque, New Mexico	Active	
**NM Epsilon**	February 6, 1937	Silver City, New Mexico	Active	
**TX Gamma Beta**	March 20, 1937	McKinney, Texas	Active	
**MO Epsilon**	October 23, 1937	Joplin, Missouri	Active	
**NC Delta**	November 20, 1937	Pitt County, North Carolina	Active	
WI Alpha	November 20, 1937– May 4, 2020	Madison, Wisconsin	Inactive	
**TX Gamma Epsilon**	1938 ?	Clay County, Montague County, and Wise County, Texas	Active	
**TX Gamma Eta**	March 26, 1938	Cottle, Crosby, Dickens, Motley, Kent, and King Counties, Texas	Active	
TX Gamma Theta	1938 ?	Borger, Texas	Inactive	
**NM Kappa**	May 7, 1938	Alamogordo, New Mexico	Active	
**WI Beta**	May 7, 1938	Kenosha, Wisconsin	Active	
**WI Gamma**	May 14, 1938	Stevens Point, Wisconsin	Active	
**NM Lambda**	October 26, 1938	Lea County, New Mexico	Active	
**WI Delta**	November 5, 1938	Milwaukee, Wisconsin	Active	
NC Epsilon	May 20, 1939	Rowan County, North Carolina	Inactive	
WI Epsilon	May 28, 1939– 2005	Oshkosh, Wisconsin	Inactive	
**NC Zeta**	June 1, 1939	Winston-Salem, North Carolina	Active	
**NC Eta**	June 17, 1939	Durham County and Person County, North Carolina	Active	(Note: NC Omicron was formed from NC Iota in 1945.) (Note: Chapter originally included Stanly County which split off to form NC Psi in 1951.)
**WI Zeta**	October 10, 1939	Green Bay, Wisconsin	Active	
**NC Theta**	October 28, 1939	Brunswick County, New Hanover County, and Pender County, North Carolina	Active	
**NC Iota**	January 1941	Goldsboro, North Carolina	Active	
**NC Kappa**	January 17, 1941	Charlotte, North Carolina	Active	
**NC Lambda**	April 20, 1941	Robeson County and Scotland County, North Carolina	Active	(Note: NC Lambda was formed in Pinehurst, North Carolina and originally included Cumberland, Harnett, Lee, Moore, and Richmond Counties. From 1951 to 1960, NC Lambda also included Hoke County. These counties later formed new chapters.)
WI Eta	September 27, 1941– 2003	Waukesha, Wisconsin	Inactive	
**WI Theta**	February 14, 1942	La Crosse, Wisconsin	Active	
WI Iota	April 25, 1942– September 6, 2014	Marinette, Wisconsin	Inactive	
**NC Nu**	May 9, 1942	Catawba County, North Carolina	Active	
NC Xi	1942 ?	Vance County, North Carolina	Inactive	
NC Pi	194x ?	Elizabeth City, North Carolina	Inactive	
WI Kappa	April 29, 1944– 2006	Eau Claire and Chippewa Falls, Wisconsin	Inactive	
**NC Omicron**	April 14, 1945	Wilson County and Greene County, North Carolina	Active	
**WI Lambda**	April 28, 1945	Richland Center, Wisconsin	Active	
MO Omicron	August 17, 1946	Lebanon, Missouri	Inactive	
**WI Nu**	November 9, 1946	Shawano and New London, Wisconsin	Active	
**PA Iota**	March 1, 1947	Altoona, Pennsylvania	Active	
**WI Mu**	March 22, 1947	Plattville, Wisconsin	Active	
**MO Pi**	May 20, 1947	St. Louis, Missouri	Active	
**TX Delta Gamma**	April 17, 1948	Sabine County, San Augustine County, and Shelby County, Texas	Active	
TX Delta Delta	1948	Brazoria County, Texas	Inactive	(Note: Chapter formed from TX Alpha Iota)
**NC Sigma**	May 1948	Kinston and Lenoir County, North Carolina	Active	
NC Tau	1949	Richmond County, North Carolina	Inactive	
**NC Upsilon**	1950 ?	Jacksonville, North Carolina	Active	
NC Phi	April 1, 1950	Harnett County, Lee County, and Moore County, North Carolina	Inactive	
**NC Chi**	April 21, 1950	High Point, Thomasville, Southern Guilford County, and Northeast Davidson County, North Carolina	Active	(Note: Chapter originally included what is now NC Alpha Upsilon and NC Delta Nu.)
WI Xi	May 13, 1951– 2004	Milwaukee, Wisconsin	Inactive	
**NC Psi**	April 7, 1951	Stanly County, North Carolina	Active	(Note: Chapter was formed from NC Eta. At one time, it included Montgomery County, which was split off in 1979 to form NC Gamma Nu.)
**WI Omicron**	May 26, 1951	Neenah and Menasha, Wisconsin	Active	(Note: Chapter formed by a division of WI Epsilon.)
**NC Alpha Beta**	April 19, 1952	Johnston County, North Carolina	Active	
BC Alpha	June 7, 1952	Vancouver, British Columbia	Inactive	
**NC Alpha Gamma**	April 11, 1953	Avery County and Watauga County, North Carolina	Active	(Note: After a few years, the chapter expanded to include Alleghany, Ashe, and Wilkes Counties. Those counties split off to form NC Beta Eta in 1966.)
**NC Alpha Delta**	May 15, 1953	Rockingham, County and Caswell County, North Carolina	Active	
**MO Tau**	March 28, 1953	Cole County, Miller County, and Moniteau County, Missouri	Active	
**WI Pi**	November 7, 1953	Racine County, Wisconsin	Active	
**TX Delta Theta**	March 20, 1954	Port Neches, Texas	Active	
WI Rho	April 12, 1955– 2000	Superior, Wisconsin	Inactive	
**NC Alpha Zeta**	April 27, 1955	Union County and Mecklenburg County, North Carolina	Active	
WI Sigma	May 14, 1955– 2005	Superior, Wisconsin	Inactive	
WI Tau	May 17, 1955– 2006	Sheboygan, Wisconsin	Inactive	
NC Alpha Eta	March 1956	Duplin County and Sampson County, North Carolina	Inactive	
**NC Alpha Theta**	April 21, 1956	Surry County, North Carolina	Active	
**TX Delta Omicron**	May 19, 1956	Dallas, Texas	Active	
**TX Delta Pi**	1956	Richardson, Texas	Active	
WI Upsilon	November 17, 1956– April 22, 2017	Beloit, Wisconsin	Inactive	
**NC Alpha Iota**	195x ?	Cherokee, Clay, Graham, Haywood, Jackson, Macon, and Swain Counties, North Carolina	Active	
**NC Alpha Lambda**	March 1, 1958	Henderson County, North Carolina	Active	(Note: Chapter originally included Transylvania County which broke off to form NC Gamma Upsilon in 1982.)
**NC Alpha Nu**	1958	Burke County and Caldwell County, North Carolina	Active	
**NC Alpha Omicron** (see **NC** **Beta**)	May 1958	Raleigh and Wake County, North Carolina	Active	(Note: Chapter formed as a division of NC Beta.)
**MO Alpha Gamma**	September 1958	Springfield, Missouri	Active	
**TX Epsilon Kappa**	October 25, 1958	Austin, Texas	Active	
**TX Epsilon Nu**	1958 ?	Fort Worth, Texas	Active	
**NC Alpha Pi**	March 11, 1959	Chatham County, North Carolina	Active	(Note: Chapter formed from NC Eta.)
**WI Phi**	September 19, 1959	Madison, Wisconsin	Active	
**TX Epsilon Upsilon**	November 7, 1959	Hidalgo County and Starr County, Texas	Active	
**TX Epsilon Phi**	November 7, 1959	Donna, Edcouch, Elsa, Mercedes, Progreso, and Weslaco, Texas	Active	
**NM Upsilon**	January 29, 1960	Gallup, New Mexico	Active	
TX Epsilon Omega	February 20, 1960	Fort Bend County, Texas	Inactive	
TX Zeta Alpha	February 20, 1960	Matagorda County, Texas	Inactive	
TX Zeta Eta	196x ?	Austin, Texas	Inactive	
**WI Chi**	January 14, 1961	Mequon and Ozaukee County, Wisconsin	Active	
**WI Psi**	April 9, 1961	Barron, Burnette, Polk, Rusk, Washburn Counties, Wisconsin	Active	
**NM Psi**	May 10, 1961	Grants, New Mexico	Active	
**NM Omega**	May 19, 1961	Las Cruces, New Mexico	Active	
NC Alpha Tau	May 20, 1961	Cumberland County and Hoke County, North Carolina	Inactive	
WI Omega	June 17, 1961– 2000	Waukesha, Wisconsin	Inactive	
WI Alpha Alpha	February 24, 1962	Milwaukee, Wisconsin	Inactive	
**WI Alpha Beta**	May 16, 1962	Hartford and West Bend, Wisconsin	Active	
**TX Zeta Omega**	November 17, 1962	Pasadena, Texas	Active	
**WI Alpha Gamma**	December 5, 1962	Whitewater, Wisconsin	Active	
WI Alpha Delta	December 12, 1962– 1992	Waukesha, Wisconsin	Inactive	
**TX Eta Alpha**	January 19, 1963	Booker, Darrouzett, Perryton, and Spearman, Texas	Active	
**TX Eta Zeta**	1963	Dallas, Texas	Active	
**PA Beta Epsilon**	1963	Altoona, Pennsylvania	Active	
TX Eta Epsilon		Tarrant County, Texas	Inactive	
**NC Alpha Upsilon**	April 18, 1963	Randolph County, North Carolina	Active	(Note: Chapter formed from a division of NC Chi. In 1992, it split to form NC Delta Nu.)
WI Alpha Epsilon	May 13, 1963– September 7, 2013	Manitowoc and Two Rivers, Wisconsin	Inactive	
WI Alpha Zeta	April 4, 1964– 2002	Viroqua, Wisconsin	Inactive	
**WI Alpha Eta**	April 11, 1964	Rhinelander, Wisconsin	Active	
WI Alpha Theta	May 7, 1964	Fond du Lac, Wisconsin	Inactive	
**WI Alpha Iota**	May 13, 1964	Janesville, Wisconsin	Active	
**NC Alpha Phi**	196x ?	Buncombe County and Henderson County North Carolina	Active	
**TX Eta Tau**	April 10, 1965	Austin, Texas	Active	
**NC Alpha Psi**	April 1965	Craven County and Pamlico County, North Carolina	Active	
**NC Beta Alpha**	196x ?	Pitt County, North Carolina	Active	
**NC Beta Delta**	March 28, 1966	Guilford County, North Carolina	Active	
**TX Theta Alpha**	April 2, 1966	Dallas-Fort Worth, Texas	Active	
**TX Theta Beta**	1966		Active	
**NM Alpha Delta**	May 14, 1966	Albuquerque, New Mexico	Active	
**NC Beta Epsilon**	1966	Gaston County and Cleveland County, North Carolina	Active	
WI Alpha Kappa	September 10, 1966– April 21, 2012	Black River Falls, Wisconsin	Inactive	
NC Beta Eta	September 24, 1966	Alleghany, Ashe, and Wilkes Counties, North Carolina	Inactive	(Note: Formed from a division of NC Alpha Gamma. In 1976, the chapter was split to form NC Delta Chi.)
**TX Theta Epsilon**	January 21, 1967	Hockley County and Cochran County, Texas	Active	
**MO Alpha Rho**	1967	Greater Kansas City, Missouri	Active	
NC Beta Iota	196x ?	Durham County and Person County, North Carolina	Inactive	
**NC Beta Kappa**	April 22, 1967	Durham County and Person County, North Carolina	Active	
WI Alpha Lambda	April 29, 1967– 2000	Milwaukee, Wisconsin	Inactive	
**NM Alpha Epsilon**	May 20, 1967	Farmington, New Mexico	Active	
WI Alpha Mu	September 16, 1967– 2006	Green County, Wisconsin	Inactive	
WI Alpha Nu	196x ?–2001	Waukesha, Wisconsin	Inactive	
NC Beta Lambda	1968	Goldsboro, North Carolina	Inactive	(Note: Chapter was formed from a division of NC Iota.)
**TX Theta Lambda**	April 20, 1968	Houston, Texas	Active	
**MO Alpha Tau**	June 1, 1968	Bolivar, Missouri	Active	(Note: Chapter formed from a division of MO Omicron.)
**MO Alpha Upsilon**	196x ?	Liberty, Missouri	Active	
**NC Beta Xi**	196x ?	Guilford County and Davidson County, North Carolina	Active	
**TX Theta Chi**	October 6, 1969	Northeast Tarrant County, Texas	Active	
**WI Alpha Xi**	November 1, 1969	Beaver Dam, Wisconsin	Active	
NC Beta Rho	196x ?	Sampson County, North Carolina	Inactive	
**TX Iota Epsilon**	April 11, 1970	Klein, Texas	Active	
WI Alpha Omicron	May 9, 1970– 1999	Wausau and Merrill, Wisconsin	Inactive	(Note: Chapter formed from a division of WI Gamma.)
**NC Beta Upsilon**	May 21, 1970	Bertie, Gates, Hertford, Martin, Tyrell, and Washington Counties, North Carolina	Active	
**NM Alpha Theta**	May 2, 1971	Roswell, New Mexico	Active	
**NM Alpha Iota**	May 23, 1971	Albuquerque, New Mexico	Active	
WI Alpha Pi	April 2, 1972– 1999	Milwaukee, Wisconsin	Inactive	
**MO Beta Delta**	January 26, 1974	St. Louis, Missouri	Active	
WI Alpha Rho	May 22, 1974– 1999	Waukesha, Wisconsin	Inactive	
WI Alpha Sigma	May 29, 1974– 1992	Pewaukee and Oconomowoc, Wisconsin	Inactive	
**TX Iota Upsilon**	197x ?	Comanche County and Mills County, Texas	Active	
TX Iota Omega	1975	Plano, Texas	Inactive	(Note: Chapter formed from a division of TX Gamma Beta.)
MO Beta Lambda	1975	Greenfield, Missouri	Inactive	
**PA Beta Xi**	1975	State College, Pennsylvania	Active	
**IS Alpha**	November 7, 1975	Reykjavík, Iceland	Active	
NC Gamma Gamma	April 3, 1976	Scotland County, North Carolina	Inactive	
MO Beta Mu	May 1976		Inactive	(Note: Chapter was established by Alpha Gamma.)
**WI Alpha Tau**	May 11, 1976	Menomonie, Wisconsin	Active	
**NC Gamma Epsilon**	197x ?	Jones County, North Carolina	Active	
**NC Gamma Zeta**	197x ?	Carteret County, North Carolina	Active	
**NC Gamma Epsilon**	197x ?	Jones County, North Carolina	Active	
**NC Gamma Theta**	197x ?	Wake County, North Carolina	Active	
**NC Gamma Kappa**	April 7, 1977	Cumberland County and Hoke County, North Carolina	Active	
**TX Kappa Theta**	April 30, 1977	Lewisville, Texas	Active	
**IS Beta**	June 2, 1977	Akureyri, Iceland	Active	
**IS Gamma**	June 5, 1977	Reykjavík, Iceland	Active	
**TX Kappa Lambda**	December 3, 1977		Active	
NC Gamma Mu	March 4, 1978	Wilson County and Greene County, North Carolina	Inactive	
**TX Kappa Phi**	January 20, 1979	Carrollton, Texas	Active	
**TX Lambda Alpha**	1979		Active	
NC Gamma Nu	April 7, 1979	Montgomery County, North Carolina	Inactive	(Note: Chapter formed by a division of NC Psi.)
**NM Alpha Lambda**	May 11, 1979	Hobbs, New Mexico	Active	
**WI Alpha Upsilon**	June 12, 1980	Sparta, Wisconsin	Active	
WI Alpha Phi	November 1, 1980– 2006	Green Lake County, Wisconsin	Inactive	
**NC Gamma Tau**	198x ?	Franklin County, North Carolina	Active	
**TX Lambda Omicron**	198x ?	Greater Fort Cavazos, Texas	Active	
**TX Lambda Pi**	198x ?	Granbury, Texas	Active	
**NC Gamma Upsilon**	1982	Transylvania County, North Carolina	Active	(Note: Chapter formed from the division of NC Alpha Lambda.)
**MO Beta Omega**	January 1982	St. Charles, Missouri	Active	
**TX Lambda Sigma**	February 13, 1982	Missouri City, Texas	Active	
WI Alpha Chi	May 11, 1982– 2006	Eau Claire and Chippewa Falls, Wisconsin	Inactive	
WI Alpha Psi	May 15, 1982– April 30, 2016	Marshfield, Wisconsin	Inactive	
**NC Gamma Chi**	May 7, 1983	Warren County, North Carolina	Active	
TX Lambda Omega	1983	Menard, Mason, and Kimble Counties, Texas	Inactive	
**NC Gamma Psi**	April 6, 1984	Elkin and Yadkin County, North Carolina	Active	
**NC Delta Beta**	198x ?	Alamance County and Person County, North Carolina	Active	
NC Delta Gamma	198x ?	Durham County and Person County, North Carolina	Inactive	
**TX Mu Epsilon**	September 1986	Cooke County, Texas	Active	
**IS Delta**	May 2, 1987	Akranes, Borgarnes, and Borgarfjörður eystri, Iceland	Active	
**WI Alpha Omega**	May 13, 1987	La Crosse, Wisconsin	Active	
**IS Epsilon**	April 1989	South Iceland	Active	
**TX Mu Kappa**	April 15, 1989	El Paso, Texas	Active	
**NC Delta Zeta**	December 2, 1989	Dare County, North Carolina	Active	(Note: Chapter formed from a division of NC Pi.)
TX Mu Mu	October 6, 1991	Allen, Texas	Inactive	
**IS Zeta**	199x ?	East Iceland	Active	
NC Delta Lambda	1992 ?	Goldsboro, North Carolina	Inactive	
**NC Delta Mu**	April 16, 1992	Sampson County, North Carolina	Active	(Note: Chapter formed from a division of NC Beta Rho.)
**NC Delta Nu**	April 26, 1992	Asheboro, North Carolina	Active	(Note: Chapter formed from a division of Alpha Upsilon.)
NC Delta Omicron	September 17, 1992	Scotland County, North Carolina	Inactive	
**NC Delta Pi**	November 11, 1995	Southern Iredell County, North Carolina	Active	
**NC Delta Rho**	June 11, 1996	Sanford, North Carolina	Active	
**WI Beta Alpha**	September 18, 1996	Delafield, Hartland, Oconomowoc, Waukesha, and West Allis, Wisconsin	Active	
**IS Eta**	June 6, 1997	Reykjavík, Iceland	Active	
**IS Theta**	November 26, 1998	Suðurnes, Iceland	Active	
TX Mu Tau	September 25, 1999	Kaufman County, Texas	Inactive	(Note: Chapter formed from TX Alpha Tau.)
**NC Delta Sigma**	April 18, 2010	Lincoln County, North Carolina	Active	
**NC Delta Tau**	August 21, 2011	Cleveland County, North Carolina	Active	(Note: Chapter formed as a division of NC Beta Epsilon.)
**NC Delta Chi**	October 15, 2012	Wilkes County, North Carolina	Active	(Note: Chapter formed from a division of NC Beta Eta. After going dormant, it was reformed from NC Beta Eta in 2012.)
**TX Nu Alpha**	2015	Leander and Cedar Park, Texas	Active	
**TX Nu Gamma**	May 1, 2016	Wylie, Texas	Active	
**TX Nu Delta**	20xx ?	Frisco, Little Elm, and Prosper, Texas	Active	
**NC Delta Psi**	20xx ?	Stokes County, North Carolina	Active	
**IS Iota**	20xx ?	Westfjords, Iceland	Active	
**IS Kappa**	March 28, 2007	Capital Region, Iceland	Active	
**IS Lambda**	October 28, 2010	Reykjavík, Iceland	Active	
**IS Mu**	April 26, 2011	Hörgársveit, Iceland	Active	
**IS Nu**	April 2, 2017	Blönduós, Iceland	Active	
**AL Pi**		Auburn, Opelika, and Lee County, Alabama	Active	
TX Kappa Kappa		Alief, Houston, Texas	Inactive	
TX Mu Sigma		Friendswood and Pearland, Texas	Inactive	
**Vancouver (BC Delta)**		Vancouver, British Columbia, Canada	Active	(Note: British Columbia renamed its chapters by geographical locations in September 2013.)
**Fraser Shores** **(BC Gamma)**		Coquitlam, Surrey, and New Westminster, British Columbia, Canada	Active	
**South Vancouver Island** **(BC Lambda)**		Greater Victoria and southern Vancouver Island, British Columbia, Canada	Active	
