= Annie Moore Cherry =

American professor, author, and playwright

Annie Moore Cherry (September 21, 1891, – February 1, 1976) was an American professor, author, and playwright. She had multiple roles in education and put together a play for Halifax County schools in 1921, titled The Spirit of The Roanoke - A Pageant of Halifax County History

== Early life ==
Cherry was born in Martin County to William Rodney and Elizabeth Eleanor Moore Cherry, spending most of her childhood in Hobgood and Scotland Neck. She graduated from The University of North Carolina at Greensboro, when it was known as the State Normal and Industrial School in 1912. Cherry was a member of Delta Kappa Gamma which is an honor society for women educators.

In 1927, she earned a master of arts degree in education from Columbia University, where she later completed graduate work along with the University of North Carolina at Chapel Hill and Duke University.

== Career ==
=== Teaching ===
Cherry started teaching in Dunn, North Carolina and stayed there for four years. She was briefly the rural elementary school supervisor in Harnett County. From 1918 to 1933, Cherry was a rural elementary school supervisor in Halifax County, with her being the first person to have that role full-time. In 1947, she was one of only six women presidents of North Carolina Education Association, with her being the third one.

Later, she was a researcher with the North Carolina Department of Public Instruction and an education professor at Flora MacDonald College. Cherry taught summer school at Western Carolina University, the University of North Carolina at Chapel Hill, Duke University, and the University of North Carolina at Greensboro.

=== Writing ===
While she was the rural school supervisor of Halifax County, Cherry planned a play that included multiple school groups. Each group was assigned the task of finding costumes for the pageant and learning about their past in Halifax County. The pageant, titled The Spirit of The Roanoke - A Pageant of Halifax County History, was performed in Weldon on May 6, 1921. Cherry wrote an article about the pageant in the Scotland Neck newspaper The Commonwealth. She wrote many bulletins about school supervision.

== Personal life ==
Cherry died on February 1, 1976, at 84 years old. Her funeral service was held at Enfield United Methodist Church. She was buried at Trinity Episcopal Church Cemetery, located in Scotland Neck.
