= Texas University =

Texas University or t.u. is a name for the University of Texas at Austin, sometimes used in a derogatory manner by students at Texas A&M University.

Texas University may also refer to:

- Southwestern University in Georgetown, Texas, which used the name "Texas University" from 1872 to 1875
- Texas College in Tyler, Texas
- Texas State University in San Marcos, Texas
- Texas Woman's University (TWU), a public coeducational university in Denton, Texas

== See also ==
- List of colleges and universities in Texas
