= Nora Beust =

American writer (1888–1973)

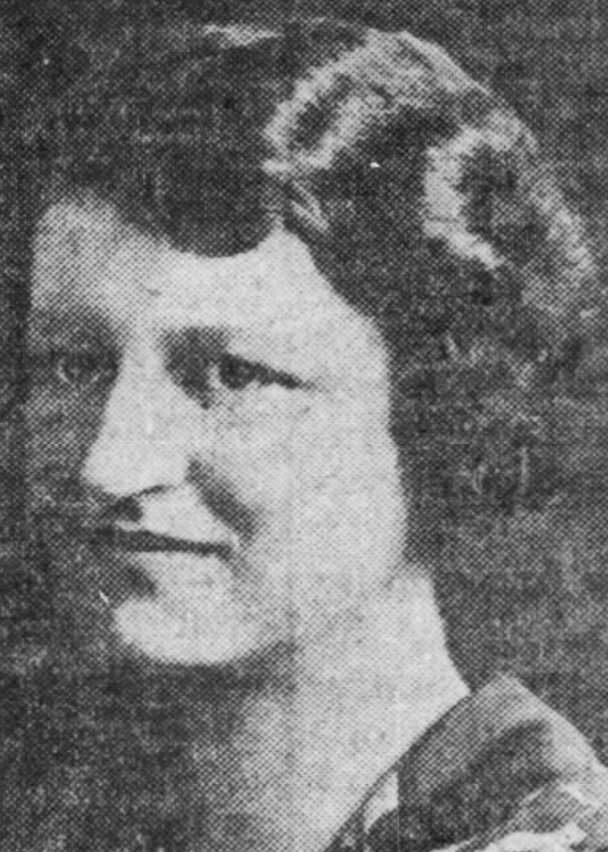
- Nora Beust, from a 1925 newspaper
- Born: 1888; New Albany, Indiana
- Died: July 3, 1973 (aged 84–85); Black Mountain, North Carolina
- Occupations: Writer, librarian, college professor, federal education official

Nora Ernestine Beust (1888 – July 3, 1973) was an American librarian, educator, and writer. She taught library science courses at the University of North Carolina at Chapel Hill, and worked in the United States Office of Education, as a specialist in school libraries and children's literature.

== Early life and education ==
Nora Beust was born in New Albany, Indiana, the daughter of Max Beust and Dora Segelke Beust. Her father operated a drugstore in New Albany. She earned a bachelor's degree at the University of Wisconsin in 1923, and a graduate degree in library science at the University of North Carolina at Chapel Hill (UNC). At UNC she was a co-founder and first president of the North Carolina chapter of Delta Kappa Gamma.

== Career ==
Beust was a college reference librarian in La Crosse, Wisconsin in the 1920s, served on the executive committee of the Wisconsin Library Association, and was active in a sewing club in La Crosse. After graduate school, she stayed in North Carolina and taught at UNC from 1927 to 1937. She was elected president of the North Carolina Library Association in 1935.

Beust moved to Washington, D.C. in 1937, when she was appointed to work at the United States Office of Education, as a specialist in school and children's libraries. She produced materials for and about school libraries and children's books, spoke at professional meetings of school librarians, and worked in Korea from 1954 to 1955, on promoting and distributing children's literature. She retired from the Office of Education in 1957. She testified before a 1962 House hearing on children's literature in the Library of Congress.

Beust was also active in Altrusa International, and represented the Durham chapter at a national peace conference in 1938. She was later president of the Washington, D.C. chapter of Altrusa.

== Publications ==
- "New Books for Christmas" (1931)
- Professional Library Education: Introducing the Library (1938)
- 500 Books for Children (1940)
- Know your school library (1940)
- School Library Administration (1941, with Eunice L. Hoffman)
- Our neighbor republics; a selected list of readable books for young people (1942, with Emilie Dew Sandsten Lassalle and Jean Gardiner Smith)
- School Library Standards (1954)
- Through Golden Windows (1958) a 10-volume story anthology set for young readers co-edited with Jeanne Hale, including:
  - Mostly Magic
  - Fun and Fantasy
  - Wonderful Things Happen
  - Adventures Here and There
  - Good Times Together
  - Children Everywhere
  - Stories of Early America
  - American Backgrounds
  - Wide Wonderful World
  - Man and His World

== Personal life ==
Beust moved to Black Mountain, North Carolina in 1964. She died in 1973, at a nursing home in Black Mountain.
