= Fannie Stebbins =

American schoolteacher and naturalist (1858–1949)

- Born: September 3, 1858; Wilbraham, Massachusetts
- Died: July 1, 1949 (aged 90); Chicopee, Massachusetts
- Occupations: Schoolteacher, naturalist

Fannie Adelle Stebbins (September 3, 1858 – July 1, 1949) was an American science teacher and naturalist. She spent most of her career working in Springfield, Massachusetts. Fannie Stebbins Memorial Wildlife Refuge, a protected area of the Connecticut River, is named in her honor.

== Biography ==
Fannie Stebbins was born in Wilbraham, Massachusetts to George and Cynthia (Billings) Stebbins. Her father, a farmer, died when she was 15 years old. She had two brothers, one who became a patent attorney in Washington, D.C., and one who was a "chief bill clerk" in Springfield when he died in 1919. She went to school in Wilbraham and college at Westfield State Teachers College, graduating in 1880.

She was a teacher in the Springfield, Massachusetts public schools for most of her career, ultimately serving as supervisor of nature study for the district. According to The Auk, in 1888, "she was appointed a training teacher in science and nature study in the Springfield Normal Training School, when these subjects were relatively new as studies for children. The courses that she developed, with field trips extending to the Berkshires and throughout the Connecticut valley, were highly successful." One of her students was a Maine teacher and ornithologist named Cordelia Stanwood. In all she was a teacher, school principal, and supervisor of science instruction for 42 years.

In 1912 Stebbins co-founded the Allen Bird Club, which is considered the longest continuously operating birding club in Massachusetts. Her sightings of a glossy ibis (in 1926) and a scissor-tailed flycatcher (in 1932) were considered significant and memorable.

Entomologist Lewis H. Weld cited observations made by "Miss Stebbins", author of "Insect Galls of Springfield, Massachusetts and Vicinity" (1909), in his 1926 paper published by the Smithsonian, "Field Notes on Gall-Inhabiting Cynipid Wasps with Descriptions of New Species".

Stebbins also presented papers on local geology to the Springfield Geology Club, and studied and taught botany and astronomy. In 1896 she donated a number of photographs and lantern slides to the Springfield Library. Circa 1910 she was lecturing on mineralogy to community groups at the library. She was an Associate of the American Ornithologists' Union, an honorary life member of the American Nature Study Society, and "considerable data were supplied by her to the old U.S. Biological Survey". In 1938 she was named a fellow of the American Association for the Advancement of Science. In 1946 she was made an honorary member of Delta Kappa Gamma, a professional organization for female educators.

Circa 1924 she owned the "old Mary Leach house" in Middlefield. She died at a nursing home in Chicopee, Massachusetts in 1949.

The day after she died, a Holyoke, Massachusetts newspaper wrote:

"Miss Stebbins opened the books for the science of nature that is all around us and [tried] to tell us of our relationships with the trees and the rocks and the stars. Her city, this Connecticut Valley, her country, and its government, all turned to Fannie Stebbins for her own findings in the fields of natural science. For her, and lot of us, that started with her love and study of birds and their way of life. Personally she was a most comfortable woman, robust, friendly, keen, warm-hearted, pleasant-spoken, rather a daughter of Nature. Now she is dead at age 91—and leaves one of those lovely trails that some people are able to build—a trail which countless followers will keep living."

== Legacy ==
Fannie Stebbins Memorial Wildlife Refuge is just south of the Chicopee River on the left bank of the Connecticut

Fannie Stebbins Memorial Wildlife Refuge, a 371-acre (150 ha) park also known as the Fannie Stebbins Unit of the Silvio O. Conte National Fish and Wildlife Refuge, is named in her honor. The refuge was established by the Allen Bird Club in 1951. The refuge is a floodplain of the Connecticut River that has been identified as an important birding area by the Massachusetts Audubon Society. The Fannie Stebbins Refuge is located on Pondside Road, Longmeadow, Hampden County, Massachusetts.

== See also ==
- Category:Taxa named by Fannie A. Stebbins
