= Delta Kappa Gamma Society International Headquarters Building =

- U.S. National Register of Historic Places
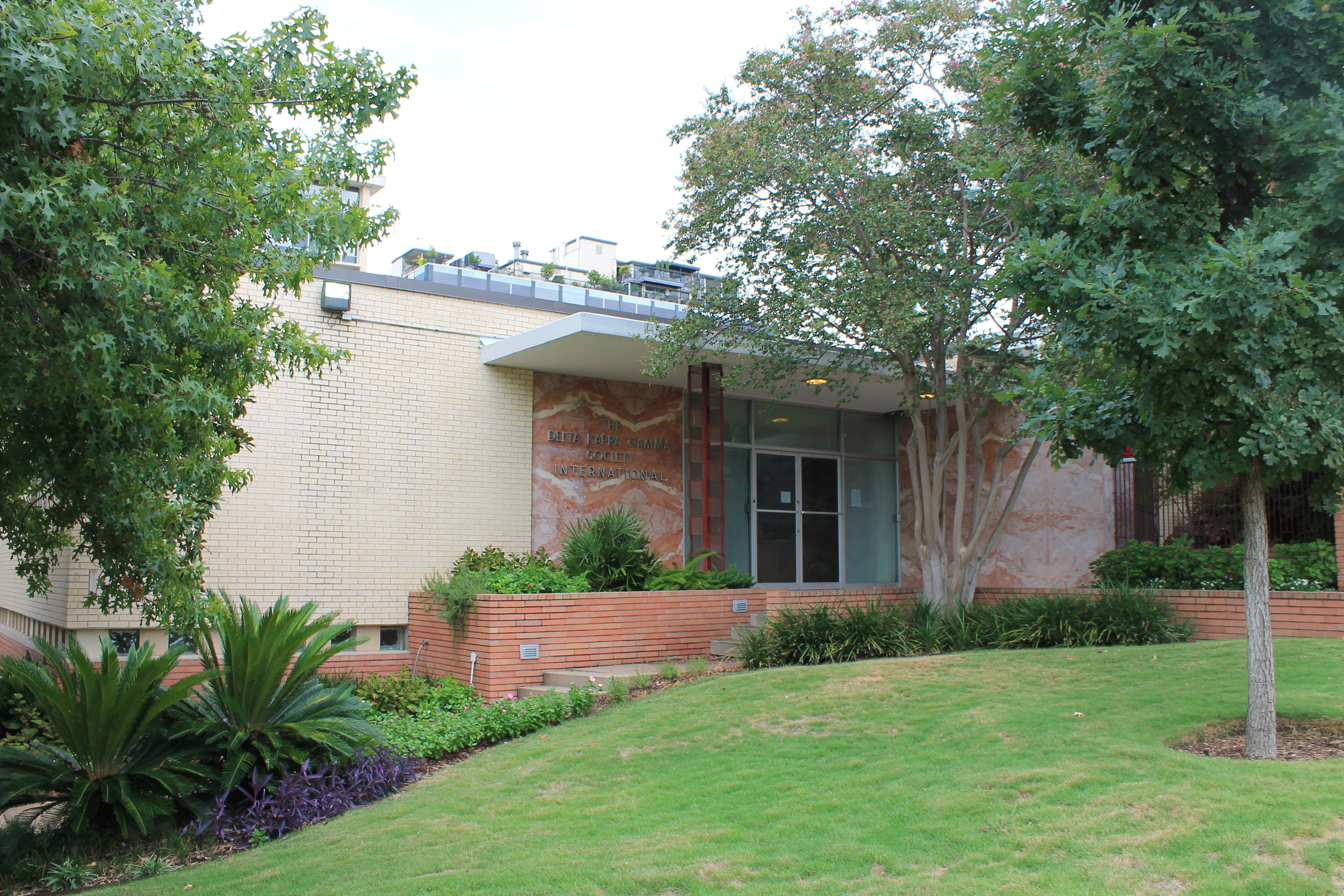

- Location within Texas Location within the United States
- Location: 416 West 12th Street, Austin, Texas
- Coordinates: 30°16′31″N 97°44′41″W
- Area: less than one acre
- Built: 1956
- Architect: Kuehne, Brooks and Barr
- Architectural style: International
- NRHP reference No.: 12000198
- Added to NRHP: April 10, 2012

The Delta Kappa Gamma Society International Headquarters Building is a historic building at 416 West 12th Street in Austin, Texas. Since its construction in 1956, this International style building has housed the international headquarters of Delta Kappa Gamma, a professional society supporting the advancement of women founded in 1929.

It was designed by the Austin firm Kuehne, Brooks and Barr. Architecturally, it is a C-shaped concrete and steel structure, two stories in height, with a main upper level, and a second basement level that is partially obscured by the sloping terrain of the lot. Its design includes hallmarks of the International style propounded by Ludwig Mies van der Rohe: intersecting horizontal and vertical planes that highlight a variety of materials, including different colors of brick, concrete blocks, and marble.

The building was listed on the National Register of Historic Places in 2012.

== See also ==
- National Register of Historic Places listings in Travis County, Texas
