= Sue Ramsey Johnston Ferguson =

American politician (1897–1977)

North Carolina Senate
- In office 1947–1949

Personal details
- Born: Sue Ramsey Johnston; June 19, 1897 Mecklenburg County, North Carolina, US
- Died: November 16, 1977 (aged 80) Newton, North Carolina, US
- Party: Democratic
- Education: Woman's College of North Carolina
- Profession: Educator

Sue Ramsey Johnston Ferguson (June 19, 1897 – November 16, 1977) was an American politician and educator. She served in the North Carolina Senate from 1947 to 1949.

== Early life ==
Sue Ramsey Johnston was born on June 19, 1897 in Mecklenburg County, North Carolina. She was the daughter of Grace W. (nee Alexander) and Rufus M. Johnston.

She graduated from Woman's College of North Carolina (now the University of North Carolina at Greensboro) in 1918. She was a member of Delta Kappa Gamma, honorary education society. She later received a master's degree from Columbia University in New York.

== Career ==
Ferguson taught public school in Gastonia, North Carolina.

She served in the North Carolina Senate for the 28th district from 1947 to 1949 as a Democrat. While in the senate she proposed the creation of a committee to investigate the North Carolina state school system, leading to the formation of the State Education Commission. She was a Democratic presidential elector for North Carolina in 1948 and 1952, and was a delegate to the 1960 Democratic National Convention.

Ferguson served as a trustee of the University of North Carolina from 1941 to 1957, and of North Carolina Central University in the 1960s. She was also a member of the North Carolina State Board of Education.

== Honors ==
The Sue Ramsey Johnston Ferguson Scholarship at the School of Health and Human Resources at the University of North Carolina at Greensboro was established in her honor in 1978.

== Personal life ==
She married Raymond Stanley Ferguson on February 14, 1934. They lived in on Liledoug Farm in Taylorsville, North Carolina. The couple had a son and a daughter.

Ferguson was the founder and first president of the University of North Carolina at Greensboro's Home Economics Foundation, serving in that capacity for seventeen years. She was also president Women's College Alumni Association and president of the Home Economics Alumni Association at the University of North Carolina at Greensboro. She donated the land to establish the Alexander County Library and helped establish the Alexander County Democratic Women.

She was a member of the Daughters of the American Revolution, the General Federation of Women's Clubs, and the Order of the Eastern Star. She belonged to the Taylorsville Presbyterian Church.

After a long illness, Ferguson died at the United Church Retirement Home in Newton, North Carolina on November 16, 1977, at the age of 80 years. She left her body to the Bowman Grey School of Medicine.
