= Saulsville, West Virginia =

Community in West Virginia, US

Saulsville
- Unincorporated community
- Location within the state of West Virginia Saulsville (the United States)
- Coordinates: 37°38′34″N 81°27′24″W
- Country: United States
- State: West Virginia
- County: Wyoming
- Time zone: UTC-5 (Eastern (EST))
  - Summer (DST): UTC-4 (EDT)
- ZIP codes: 25876
- GNIS feature ID: 1546450

Saulsville is an unincorporated community in Wyoming County, West Virginia, United States that has a population of about 140. Saulsville is where Twin Falls State Park is located. Saulsville has a gas station and is also home to the Wyoming County branch of Southern West Virginia Community College, a Logan County based 2 year community college.

The community was named after James Sauls, a local letter carrier.
