= Guðrún P. Helgadóttir =

Icelandic writer (1922–2006)

- Born: April 19, 1922; Reykjavík, Iceland
- Died: July 5, 2006 (aged 84); Reykjavík, Iceland
- Occupations: Writer, poet, scholar, educator
- Awards: Order of the Falcon

Academic background
- Education: University of Iceland (BA); University of Oxford (PhD)
- Doctoral advisor: Gabriel Turville-Petre

Academic work
- Discipline: Icelandic studies
- Sub-discipline: Icelandic literature; Women's studies; History of medicine

Guðrún P. Helgadóttir (April 19, 1922 – July 5, 2006) was an Icelandic writer, poet, scholar, and educator, renowned for her pioneering work in Icelandic literature, women's studies, and the history of medicine. Guðrún had a significant career in education, notably serving as the principal of Kvennaskólinn í Reykjavík, the first secondary school for women in Iceland.

== Biography ==
=== Early life and education ===
Guðrún P. Helgadóttir was born on April 19, 1922, in Reykjavík, Iceland, to Dr. Helgi Ingvarsson, a medical doctor, and Guðrún Lárusdóttir. She developed an interest in literature and scholarship early on. Guðrún graduated from Menntaskólinn í Reykjavík (Reykjavík Junior College) in 1941, and later completed her studies at the Icelandic College of Education in 1945. She pursued majors in Icelandic and English at the University of Iceland, earning a Bachelor of Arts degree in 1949.

Guðrún continued her education at Oxford University, where she earned a PhD in 1968. Her doctoral research, supervised by Professor Gabriel Turville-Petre, focused on The Saga of Hrafn Sveinbjarnarson, a medieval Icelandic text. This research was later published by Clarendon Press in 1987.

=== Career ===
Guðrún’s professional career was marked by her roles as both an educator and a scholar. She began teaching Icelandic at various schools in Iceland and became the principal of Kvennaskólinn í Reykjavík in 1961, a position she held for many years. The school, established in 1874, was the first secondary school in Iceland for women, and under Guðrún’s leadership, it became an important institution for women’s education in Iceland. Her tenure as principal was characterized by an emphasis on academic rigor, particularly in Icelandic literature and the arts. She was regarded as an outstanding teacher of Icelandic and literature and leader in education.

Alongside her teaching role, Guðrún was active in scholarly research. She became known for her contributions to the study of women’s literature, particularly her work on the role of female poets in Icelandic literary history. Her research examined the contributions of female poets from the 9th to the 19th century, an area that had not been widely explored in earlier Icelandic literary scholarship. One of her key works was a biography of Júlíana Jónsdóttir, one of Iceland’s early female poets, which contributed to a broader recognition of women’s roles in Icelandic literary culture.

Guðrún’s academic interests also included the history of medicine in medieval Iceland. Her doctoral research on The Saga of Hrafn Sveinbjarnarson explored the intersection of medicine and Icelandic sagas, focusing on Hrafn, a chieftain and healer. This work marked the beginning of her exploration into medieval medical practices. Later, she expanded her research in this field, writing about the history of medicine in Iceland and the broader Nordic region, including biographical studies of her medical doctor father, Dr. Helgi Ingvarsson, and her grandfather, who was a homeopath.

In 1982, Guðrún published her own poetry, which reflected themes such as Icelandic identity, the natural landscape, and the role of women in society.

=== Final years, death, and legacy ===
After retiring from her role as principal of Kvennaskólinn í Reykjavík, Guðrún remained engaged in cultural and academic activities. She served as president of the Women’s Alliance of Reykjavík. She also contributed to the National Hospital of Iceland (Landspítali) through her work with its memorial fund. Guðrún was a founding member of the Delta Kappa Gamma Society in Iceland in 1975, an international organization for women educators.

Guðrún died on July 5, 2006, at the age of 84.

== Honours ==
Throughout her career, Guðrún was recognized for her contributions to Icelandic scholarship and culture. She was awarded the Knight’s Cross of the Order of the Falcon in 1964, the Commander’s Cross in 1971, and the Commander’s Cross with Star in 1989. These honors were presented by the president of Iceland in recognition of her work in education, literature, and cultural service.
