= Delta Kappa Gamma =

Professional society for women educators

- ΔΚΓ
- Founded: May 11, 1929; 96 years ago University of Texas at Austin
- Type: Professional
- Affiliation: Independent
- Status: Active
- Emphasis: Women Educators - non-collegiate
- Scope: International
- Motto: "Each for all and all for each"
- Pillars: Unite, Honor, Advance, Support, Endow, Stimulate, and Inform
- Member badge
- Colors: Red and Green
- Symbol: Rose
- Flower: Red Rose
- Publication: Bulletin Journal; DKG News
- Chapters: 3,000+
- Members: 90,000 active
- Headquarters: 416 West 12th Street; Austin, Texas 78701; United States
- Website: www.dkg.org

Delta Kappa Gamma (ΔΚΓ) is an international professional society for women educators. It was established in 1929 at the University of Texas at Austin.

== History ==
Delta Kappa Gamma was founded on May 11, 1929, at the Faculty Women’s Club at the University of Texas, Austin, Texas. Its purpose was to promote excellence in education and women educators' personal and professional growth. Delta Kappa Gamma was conceived by Annie Webb Blanton, faculty member of the University of Texas and a former Texas state superintendent of public instruction.

Eleven women educators were Delta Kappa Gamma's charter members: Mamie Sue Bastian, Ruby Cole, Mabel Grizzard, Anna Hiss, Ray King, Sue King, Helen Koch, Ruby Terrill Lomax, Cora M. Martin, Lalla M. Odom, and Lela Lee Williams.

By 2004, Delta Kappa Gamma had 2,960 chapters and 132,000 members. By 2019, it had chapters in seventeen countries.

Delta Kappa Gamma has established scholarships to allow women to pursue graduate degrees and encourage women in foreign countries to seek a degree in education. As of 2025, the society has around 90,000 members in eighteen countries.

== Symbols ==
The name Delta Kappa Gamma was selected to stand for the Greek words Διδασκοτικι (teacher), Κλειδουχι (key), and Γυναικεσ (women). The society's motto is "Each for all and all for each." Its seven purposes or pillars are to Unite, Honor, Advance, Support, Endow, Stimulate, and Inform.

The society's coat of arms features a red shield with three Tudor roses on a gold band, a flaming lamp above the band and an open book below. The three roses represent friendship, helpfulness, and loyalty. The lamp and book symbolize scholarship and knowledge. Above the shield is a gold cup of knowledge, surrounded by a laurel wreath symbolizing achievement. Below the shield, the motto consists of Delta Kappa Gamma in Greek.

DKG Rose

Its badge is a gold ellipse-shaped key-pin with the Greek letters ΔΚΓ across its center. Below the letters is the cup of knowledge. Above the letters is a laurel wreath.

Delta Kappa Gamma's colors are red and green, with red representing courage and gold symbolizing loyalty. Its symbol and flower are the red rose, representing the beauty of mind and spirit. The red rose logo was developed in a recent rebranding effort.

== Membership ==
Delta Kappa Gamma has four categories of members: active, reserve, honorary, and collegiate. Active members are working or have retired from an educational position. Reserve members can no longer participate due to geographic location or a disability. Collegiate members are in their last two years of seeking a college degree in education and are not yet employed in the field.

== Governance ==
Delta Kappa Gamma is governed by its constitution and international standing rules as adopted by its international convention. Its executive board is elected at the convention. The society is structured in three levels: local, state, and international organizations. Its constitution and standing rules govern activities at all levels.

The Delta Kappa Gamma Society International Headquarters Building is at 416 West 12th Street in Austin, Texas. It was built for the society in 1956 and was listed on the National Register of Historic Places in 2012.

== Chapters ==
As of 2025, Delta Kappa Gamma has chapters in eighteen countries. Member countries as of October 2020 are the United States, Canada, Norway, Sweden, Mexico, Finland, Guatemala, Iceland, The Netherlands, Great Britain, El Salvador, Costa Rica, Germany, Estonia, Panama, and Japan.

== Notable members ==
As of 2025, the society has around 90,000 members in eighteen countries.

== See also ==
- Professional fraternities and sororities
- Women's club movement in the United States
