= West Virginia High School Football State Championships and playoff history (1903–2023) =

The West Virginia High School Football State Championships have been held since the early 1900s. The West Virginia Secondary School Activities Commission (WVSSAC) began its formal recognition of WV State Football Championships in 1937 with the state's sports writers' vote. The WVSSAC began a class system, dividing larger and smaller schools in 1947. WVSSAC official playoff games began in 1948. Prior to the WVSSAC's involvement in an official playoff, there were other systems in play. From 1916 to 1955 the WVSSAC was called the West Virginia Athletic Association.

== Champions by popular acclaim ==
=== Single class ===
(*school no longer exists)

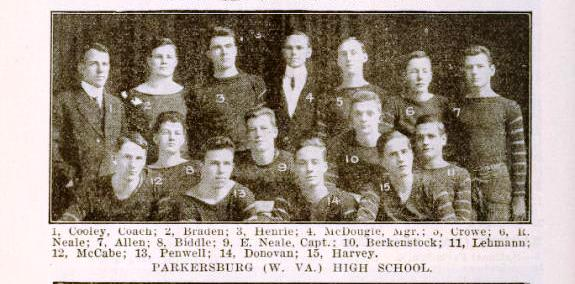
Recognized by Spalding Bros. 1911 Football Guide as WV State Football Champions, this was the first of Parkersburg High's 17 State Football Titles.

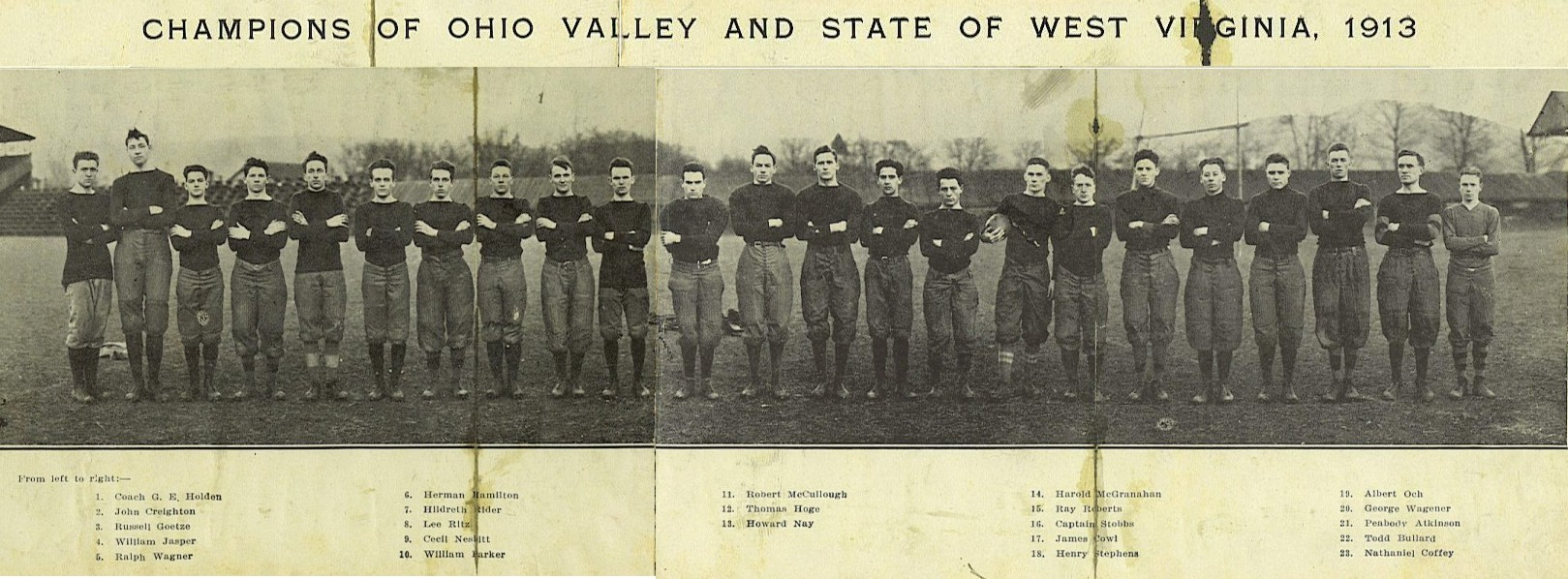
1913 WV State Football Champions, Wheeling High School

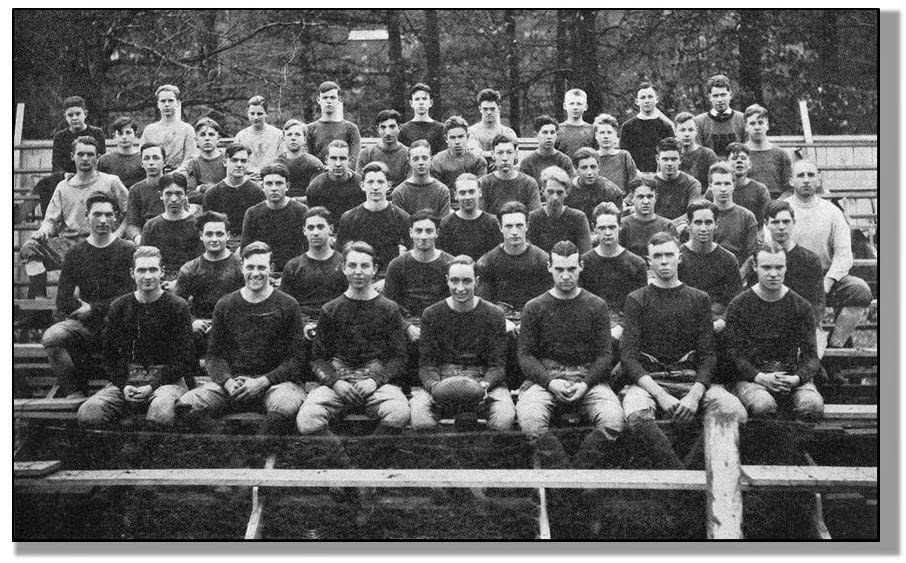
Clarksburg-Washington Irving High School, WV State Football Champions, 1926. Coach Clay Hite lead the Hilltoppers to state championships in 1922 and 1926. The downtown football field, now used by Washington Irving Middle School, still bears his name, Hite Field.

Year	Champion
1903	Fairmont Senior (8–0–0)
1907	Fairmont Senior (2) (6–3–0)
1908	Wheeling* (Note: consolidated with Wheeling, Triadelphia, Warwood and West Liberty into Wheeling Park High School 1976.)
1909	(Old) Huntington* (5–1–0) (Note: Consolidated with Huntington East High School in 1996 into New Huntington High School.)
1911	Parkersburg (10–0–0)
1912	(Old) Huntington* (2) (5–3–0)
1913	Wheeling* (2)
1915	Buckhannon (8–0–0) (Note: consolidated with Upshur High School to form Buckhannon-Upshur High School 1933.)
1916	Wheeling* (3) (8–0–1)
1917	(Old) Huntington* (3) (5–0–0)
1918	Parkersburg (2) (2–1–0)
1918	Buckhannon (2) (4–0–0)
1919	Parkersburg (3) (7–1–0)
1920	Charleston* (8–0–1) (Note: Consolidated into Capital High School in 1989.)
1921	Parkersburg (4) (9–0–0)
1922	Charleston* (2) (9–1–2)
1922	Parkersburg (5) (9–2–0)
1922	Clarksburg Washington Irving* (8–1–0) (Note: consolidated into Robert C. Byrd High School 1995.)
1922	St. Marys (9–1–0)
1922	Wheeling* (4) (5–2–1)
1922	(Old) Huntington* (4) (4–4–1)
1922	Mannington* (9–0–0) (Note: Consolidated into North Marion High School in 1979.)
1923	(Old) Huntington* (5) (9–2–0)
1924	Buckhannon (3) (8–0–0)
1924	Fairmont Senior (3) (8–0–1)
1924	Charleston* (3) (11–1–1)
1925	Clarksburg-Victory* (8–0–0) (Note: Victory, Salem and Bristol consolidated in 1973 to form Liberty High School.)
1925	Wheeling* (5) (8–1–1)
1926	Benwood Union* (8–1–0) (Note: consolidated into John Marshall High School 1968.)
1926	Williamson* (11–0–0) (Note: consolidated with Gilbert, Matewan and Burch High Schools to form Mingo Central High School 2011.)
1926	Magnolia (9–0–0)
1926	Clarksburg Washington Irving* (2) (8–0–1)
1927	Morgantown (9–0–0)
1927	Parkersburg (6) (10–0–0)
1928	Benwood Union* (2) (8–0–0)
1928	Elkins (9–0–0)
1928	(Old) Huntington* (6) (10–0–2)
1929	Fairmont Senior (4) (8–0–0)
1929	Clarksburg Roosevelt-Wilson* (8–0–0)
1930	(Old) Huntington* (7) (7–3–1)
1931	Benwood Union* (3) (9–0–0)
1932	Big Creek* (9–0–0) (Note: consolidated into River View High School 2009.)
1933	Charleston* (4) (13–1–0)
1933	Doddridge (9–0–0) (Note: formed by consolidating Carr and West Union High Schools in 1933.)
1934	(Old) Huntington* (8) (10–0–0)
1934	Big Creek* (2) (9–0–0)
1935	Weir (10–0–0)
1935	Clarksburg-Victory* (2) (9–0–0)
1936	Doddridge (2) (10–0–0)

During the 1926 season Williamson and Magnolia arranged a state title game. Williamson defeated Magnolia 14–13. However, after accusations on both sides of ineligible players the WVAA (now known as the WVSSAC) stepped in and forced both teams to forfeit all their games. Doug Huff, one of WV's leading sports historians, left both schools in his book, History of Sports in West Virginia, so they are included on this list as well.

== Colored State Football Champions ==
African American students were barred from playing football with White Americans. This changed in 1954 with the Supreme Court decision Brown vs. Board of Education, which overturned school segregation. Black school athletics were governed by the WV Athletic Union but did not receive as consistent media attention as their white counterparts. This makes research difficult. Information on the Colored State Football Champions has been provided by Robert Bonner, WV high school football researcher. More will be entered as the information becomes available.

=== Single class ===
(*school no longer exists)

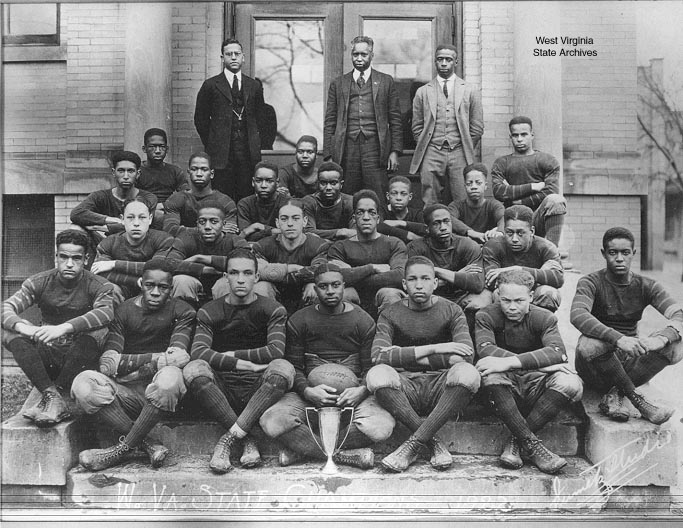
Charleston, West Virginia, Garnet High School. WVAU (West Virginia Athletic Union governed athletics for African American students during segregation) 1922 State Football Champions. First row: Robert Burks, James Field, Paul (or Roland, who later became a Charleston fireman) Wilcher, Bennie Patterson, Leonard Bicket, Ted Gallion, and Percy Terrel. Second row: Claude Morris, Tob Davis, William Buchanan, Hyte Boyd, Herbert Cain, and Earl Smith. Third row: Elijah Edwards, Ben Mitchell, Dallas Forney, Earl Powell, Bus Irving, Archibald Walker, and Lewis Jones. Fourth row: William Preston, Asst. Coach Smith, Principal J. F. J. Clark, Coach Bartlet.

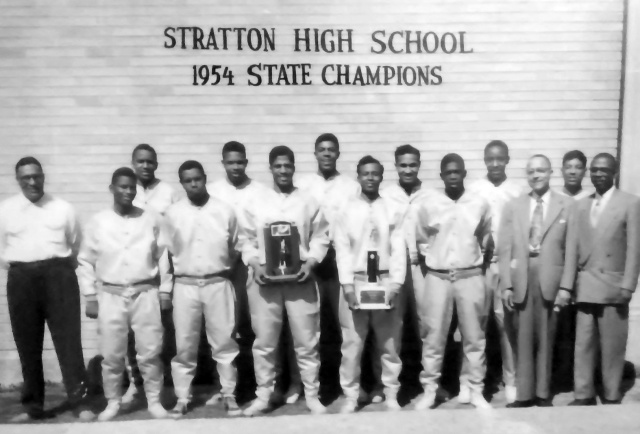
Stratton High School, WVAU State Football Champions, 1954. Beckley, West Virginia.

Year	Champion
1914	
1915	
1916	
1917	Sumner* (Note: Charles Sumner* High School, Parkersburg, West Virginia, Wood County, West Virginia)
1918	
1919	
1920	Frederick Douglass* (Note: Frederick Douglass High School, Huntington, Cabell County, WV)
1921	Frederick Douglass* (2) & Sumner* (2) (tie)
1922	Frederick Douglass* (3)
1923	Garnet* (Note: Henry Highland Garnet High School, Charleston, WV Kanawha County, WV)
1924	
1925	
1926	Booker T. Washington* (Note: Booker T. Washington High School London, Kanawha County, WV)
1927	Kelly Miller* (Note: Kelly Miller (scientist) High School Clarksburg, WV Harrison County, WV)
1928	Kelly Miller* (2)
1929	Kelly Miller* (3)
1930	Garnet* (2) (6–0–0)
1931	Fairmont-Dunbar* (Note: Paul Laurence Dunbar, Dunbar School (Fairmont, West Virginia), Marion County, West Virginia)
1932	Gary District* (Note: Gary District High School, Gary, WV, McDowell County, WV)
1933	Garnet* (3) (7–0–0)
1934	Fairmont-Dunbar* (2) (8–0–0)
1935	Excelsior* (Note: Excelsior High School, War, West Virginia, McDowell County, WV)
1936	DuBois* (Note: W. E. B. DuBois High School, Mount Hope, West Virginia, Fayette County, WV)
1937	Frederick Douglass* (4)
1938	DuBois* (2)
1939	DuBois* (3)
1940	Monongalia* (Note: Morgantown, WV, Monongalia County, WV)
1941	Stratton* (8–0–2) (Note: Rev. Daniel Stratton High School, Beckley, WV, Raleigh County, West Virginia)
1942	DuBois* (4)
1943	Fairmont-Dunbar* (3)
1944	Elkhorn* (6–0–3) (Note: Elkhorn High School, Elkhorn, West Virginia, McDowell County, West Virginia)
1945	Excelsior* (2)
1946	Stratton* (2) (10–0–0)
1947	Frederick Douglass* (5)
1948	Aracoma* (Note: Aracoma High School, Aracoma, West Virginia, Logan County, WV)
1949	Aracoma* (2)
1950	Garnet* (4) (9–1–0)
1951	Conley* (Note: Conley High School, Mullens, WV, Wyoming County, WV)
1952	Kimball* (Note: Kimball High School, Kimball, West Virginia, McDowell County, WV)
1953	Fairmont-Dunbar* (4)
1954	Stratton* (3) (9–0–0)
1955	Byrd Prillerman* (Note: Dr. Byrd Prillerman High School, Amigo, West Virginia, Raleigh County, West Virginia)
1956	Gary District* (2)

== WV Catholic Schools State Football Champions ==
Prior to 1977, most Catholic schools did not participate within the WVSSAC.

=== Single class ===
(*school no longer exists)

Year	Champion	Score	Runner-up
1962	Charleston Catholic	13–7	Wheeling Central
1963	Wheeling Central	40–6	Charleston Catholic
1964	Wheeling Central (2)	28–20	Charleston Catholic
1965	Wheeling Central (3)		no game played
1966	Wheeling Central (4)	46–6	Weirton-Madonna
1967	Wheeling Central (5)		no game played
1968	Weirton-Madonna		no game played
1969	Charleston Catholic (2)	12–7	Parkersburg Catholic
1970	Parkersburg Catholic	21–0	Clarksburg-Notre Dame
1971	Weirton-Madonna (2)	44–6	Bishop Donahue* (Note: Closed in 2017, students moved to Wheeling Central)
1972	Weirton-Madonna (3)	22–6	Charleston Catholic
1973	Charleston Catholic (3)	27–6	Weirton-Madonna
1974	Clarksburg-Notre Dame	20–16	Weirton-Madonna
1975	Weirton-Madonna (4)	39–13	Clarksburg-Notre Dame
1976	Charleston Catholic (4)	6–0	Morgantown-St. Francis*

== WV sports writers' vote ==
=== Single class ===
(*school no longer exists)

Year	Champion
1937	Hinton* (7–0–1) (Note: Consolidated into Summers County High School in 1995.)
1938	Parkersburg (7) (11–0–0)
1939	Charleston* (5) (9–0–3)
1940	Parkersburg (8) (12–0–0)
1941	Mullens* (9–0–0) (Note: Consolidated into Wyoming East High School in 1998.)
1942	Weir (2) (6–3–1)
1943	Parkersburg (9) (9–0–0)
1944	Williamson* (2) (8–1–0)
1945	South Charleston (11–0–0)
1946	Fairmont Senior (5) (9–0–1)

== Two-class system (A, B) 1947–1954 / WVSSAC Ratings ==
The WVSSAC (WVAA at the time) used a power rating system to choose the state champions in a two-class system in 1947. The WVSSAC started a playoff game system in 1948. From 1948 to 1971, only the top two teams in each class went to the playoff. In 1972 the playoff field was expanded to four teams. In 1978 the playoffs were expanded to eight teams per class. Finally, in 1991, the top 16 in each class were awarded a playoff spot.

=== Class A ===
==== Champion Selected Using Power Rankings (1947) ====
(*school no longer exists)

Year	Co-champions
1947	Woodrow Wilson (10–0–0) and Stonewall Jackson* (10–0–0) tie, no game played

==== Two-Team Playoff (1948-1954) ====
(*school no longer exists)

Year	Champion	Score	Runner-up
1948	Woodrow Wilson (2) (10–0–0)		no game played
1949	Weir (3) (11–0–0)	37–13	Milton* (10–1–0) (Note: Consolidated into Cabell Midland High School in 1994.)
1950	Parkersburg (10) (11–0–0)	40–0	Oak Hill (10–1–0)
1951	Woodrow Wilson (3) (10–0–0)	26–0	Gary* (10–1–0) (Note: Consolidated into Mount View High School in 1975.)
1952	Grafton (11–0–0)	6–0	Big Creek* (9–1–0) (Note: Consolidated into River View High School in 2010.)
1953	Barboursville* (11–0–0)	27–0	Benwood Union* (8–1–2)
1954	Follansbee* (11–0–0) (Note: Follensbee, Wellsburg and Bethany consolidated to form Brooke High School in 1969.)	7–0	Barboursville* (10–1–0)

=== Class B ===
==== Champion Selected Using Power Rankings (1947) ====
(*school no longer exists)

Year	Champion
1947	Webster Springs* (9–0–0) (Note: Webster Springs and Cowen consolidated to create Webster County High School (West Virginia) in 1974) no game played

==== Two-Team Playoff (1948–1954) ====
(*school no longer exists)

Year	Champion	Score	Runner-up
1948	Vinson* (10–1–0) (Note: Consolidated into Spring Valley High School in 1998.)	25–6	Alderson* (8–3–0) (Note: Consolidated into Greenbrier East High School in 1968.)
1949	Romney* (10–1–0) (Note: Consolidated into Hampshire High School in 1964.)	20–19	Wirt County (8–2–1)
1950	Poca (8–1–0) and Vinson* (2) (8–1–1) (Note: No game was held due to inclement weather.)	tie	no game
1951	Vinson* (3) (11–0–0)	26–7	Sissonville (9–2–0)
1952	Monongah* (9–0–0)	20–14	Winfield (9–1–0)
1953	Sistersville* (10–0–1) (Note: Consolidated into Tyler Consolidated High School in 1993.)	26–13	Romney* (9–1–0)
1954	Farmington* (9–0–1) (Note: Closed in 1975.)	39–13	Rupert* (8–1–1) (Note: Consolidated into Greenbrier West High School in 1968.)

== Three-class system (AA, A, B) 1955–1957 / WVSSAC ratings ==
=== Class AA ===
==== Two-Team Playoff ====
(*school no longer exists)

Year	Champion	Score	Runner-up
1955	St. Albans (10–0–0)		no game played
1956	Grafton (2) (9–0–1)		no game played
1957	Weir (4) (11–0–0)	19–12	Fairmont Senior (10–1–0)

=== Class A ===
==== Two-Team Playoff ====
(*school no longer exists)

Year	Champion	Score	Runner-up
1955	Bridgeport (8–1–0)	39–13	Webster Springs* (9–1–0)
1956	Keyser (11–0–0)	12–0	Mullens* (7–4–0)
1957	Vinson* (5) (11–0–0)	14–13	Keyser (10–1–0)

=== Class B ===
==== Two-Team Playoff ====
(*school no longer exists)

Year	Champion	Score	Runner-up
1955	Monongah* (2) (8–0–2)	14–13	Wirt County (10–1–0)
1956	Vinson* (4) (7–4–0)	19–7	Monongah* (6–2–2)
1957	Ravenswood (9–1–0)	34–13	Rupert* (9–1–0)

== Three-class system (AAA, AA, A) 1958–2023 / WVSSAC Ratings ==
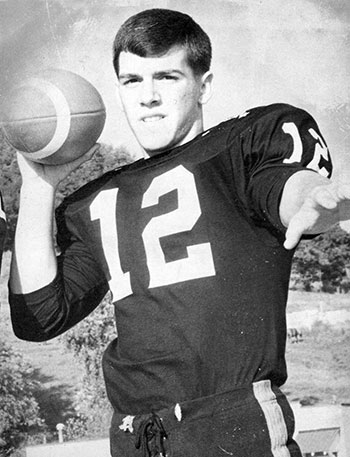
Before becoming a record setting head football coach at LSU and Alabama, Nick Saban, was a quarterback for the 1968 "A" WV State Champion Monongah High School football team.

== Class A ==
=== Two-Team Playoff (1958–1971) ===
(*school no longer exists)

Year	Champion	Score	Runner-up
1958	Meadow Bridge (10–1–0)	6–0	Winfield (9–1–0)
1959	Ravenswood (2) (10–1–0)	15–13	Winfield (10–1–0)
1960	Winfield (8–1–2)	20–13	Alderson* (9–1–0)
1961	Winfield (2) (11–0–0)	19–13	Williamstown (9–1–1)
1962	Rainelle* (11–0–0)	32–7	Sophia* (5–4–0) (Note: Consolidated into Independence High School in 1976.)
1963	Winfield (3) (10–0–1)	26–13	Northfork* ( (6–3–1)
1964	Sistersville* (2) (7–4–0)	27–0	Fairview* (9–1–0)
1965	Crum* (8–1–1) (Note: Consolidated with Fort Gay to form Tolsia High School in 1988.)	20–18	Masontown Valley* (9–1–0) (Note: Consolidated into Preston High School in 1991.)
1966	Wirt County (11–0–0)	27–6	Crum* (10–1–0)
1967	Marlinton* (11–0–0) (Note: Consolidated into Pocahontas County High School in 1968.)	26–0	Wirt County (10–1–0)
1968	Monongah* (11–0–0)	20–12	Paden City (9–2–0)
1969	Monongah* (2) (10–1–0)	26–0	Paden City (8–3–0)
1970	Paden City (9–2–0)	20–6	Wirt County (8–3–0)
1971	Ansted* (10–0–0) (Note: Consolidated into Midland Trail High School in 1976.)	20–14	Fairview* (7–2–0)

=== Four-Team Playoff (1972–1977) ===
(*school no longer exists)

==== 1972 ====
Semi-finals
1	Anstead* (9-0-0)	33
4	Harrisville* (9-1-0) (Note: consolidated into Ritchie County 1986)	12
3	Monongah* (8-1-1)	7
2	Wirt County (10-0-0)	6

Final
1	Anstead* (10-0-0) (2)	8
3	Monongah* (9-1-1)	7

==== 1973 ====
Semi-finals
1	Anstead* (10-0-0)	6
4	Monongah* (8-2-0)	14
3	Meadow Bridge (9-1-0)	6
2	South Harrison (8-1-0)	40

Final
4	Monongah* (9-2-0) (3)	26
2	South Harrison (9-1-0)	20

==== 1974 ====
Semi-finals
1	Anstead* (9-1-0)	14
4	Hamlin* (8-2-0) (Note: Consolidated into Lincoln County High School in 2006.)	18
3	Musselman (8-2-0)	28
2	Mannington* (9-1-0)	22

Final
4	Hamlin* (9-2-0)	0
3	Musselman (9-2-0)	8

==== 1975 ====
Semi-finals			Final
			1	Wirt County (10-0-0)	13
3	Hamlin* (9-0-0)	8	2	Ridgeley (11-0-0)	20
2	Ridgeley* (10-0-0) (Note: Consolidated into Frankfort High School in 1976.)	12

When the 1975 football season ended, Meadow Bridge (10–0–0) and Rivesville* (10–0–0), were tied for the #4 playoff spot in Class A. With no tie break rules, both were eliminated and #1 Wirt County received a bye in the semi-final round. The WVSSAC has since made a comprehensive tie break rule.

==== 1976 ====
Semi-finals
1	Mannington* (10-0-0)	32
4	Gilbert* (10-0-0)	22
3	Pineville* (9-1-0)	0
2	Gauley Bridge (9-1-0)	22

Final
1	Mannington* (11-0-0)	28
2	Gauley Bridge* (10-1-1)	6

==== 1977 ====
Semi-finals
1	Mannington* (10-0-0)	16
4	Paden City (9-1-0)	8
3	South Harrison (10-0-0)	0
2	Pineville* (10-0-0)	23

Final
1	Mannington* (11-0-0) (2)	28
2	Pineville* (11-0-0)	20

=== Eight-Team Playoff (1978–1990) ===
(*school no longer exists)

==== 1978 ====
Quarter-finals
1	Sistersville* (10-0-0)	26
8	Franklin* (8-1-0)	0
5	Matewan* (8-2-0)	7
4	Duval* (9-1-0)	13
3	Paden City (9-1-0)	0
6	Doddridge County (9-1-0)	6
7	Pineville* (9-1-0)	28
2	Mannington* (8-1-0)	20

Semi-finals
1	Sistersville* (11-0-0)	7
4	Duval* (10-1-0)	34
6	Doddridge County (10-1-0)	27
7	Pineville* (10-1-0)	14

Final
4	Duval* (11-1-0)	27
6	Doddridge County (11-1-0)	14

==== 1979 ====
Quarter-finals
1	Paden City (9-0-1)	41
8	Weirton Madonna (8-2-0)	14
5	Duval* (8-2-0)	6
4	Fayetteville* (8-2-0)	22
3	Gilbert* (9-1-0)	8
6	Bishop Donahue* (8-2-0)	18
7	Peterstown* (9-1-0)	47
2	Hamlin* (9-0-0)	7

Semi-finals
1	Paden City (10-0-1)	21
4	Fayetteville* (9-2-0)	8
6	Bishop Donahue* (9-2-0)	34
7	Peterstown* (10-1-0)	6

Final
1	Paden City (11-0-1) (2)	19
6	Bishop Donahue (10-2-0)	6

==== 1980 ====
Quarter-finals
1	Hamlin* (9-1-0)	36
8	Franklin* (9-1-0)	22
5	Sistersville* (9-1-0)	16
4	Paden City (9-1-0)	0
3	Pineville* (9-1-0)	12
6	Matewan* (7-2-0)	6
7	Rivesville* (9-1-0)	0
2	Notre Dame-Clarksburg (8-2-0)	23

Semi-finals
1	Hamlin* (10-1-0)	6
5	Sistersville* (10-1-0)	36
3	Pineville* (10-1-0)	0
2	Notre Dame-Clarksburg (9-2-0)	13

Final
5	Sistersville* (11-1-0) (3)	28
2	Notre Dame-Clarksburg (10-2-0)	0

==== 1981 ====
Quarter-finals
1	Sistersville* (10-0-0)	22
8	Weriton Madonna (7-2-1)	0
5	Franklin* (9-1-0)	14
4	Pineville* (8-1-0)	38
3	Clear Fork* (9-0-0)	0
6	Peterstown* (7-2-1)	28
7	Van (8-1-0)	0
2	Notre Dame-Clarksburg (10-0-0)	30

Semi-finals
1	Sistersville* (11-0-0)	48
4	Pineville* (9-1-0)	0
6	Peterstown (8-2-1)	16
2	Notre Dame-Clarksburg (11-0-0)	7

Final
1	Sistersville* (12-0-0) (4)	28
6	Peterstown (9-2-1)	3

==== 1982 ====
Quarter-finals
1	Gilbert* (9-0-0)	43
8	Morgantown-St. Francis* (9-1-0)	15
5	Duval* (9-1-0)	42
4	Rivesville* (9-0-0)	6
3	Mullens* (9-0-0)	28
6	Clear Fork* (8-0-0)	6
7	Pineville* (8-2-0)	0
2	Sistersville* (10-0-0)	40

Semi-finals
1	Gilbert* (10-0-0)	23
5	Duval* (10-1-0)	27
3	Mullens (10-0-0)	13
2	Sistersville* (11-0-0)	56

Final
5	Duval* (11-1-0) (2)	28
2	Sistersville (12-0-0)	15

==== 1983 ====
Quarter-finals
1	Sistersville* (10-0-0)	57
8	Matewan* (8-2-0)	6
5	Morgantown-St. Francis* (10-0-0)	9
4	Meadow Bridge (9-0-0)	8
3	Van (9-0-0)	15
6	Mullens* (9-1-0)	34
7	Tyler County* (9-1-0)	19
2	Gilbert* (10-0-0)	14

Semi-finals
1	Sistersville* (11-0-0)	37
5	Morgantown-St. Francis* (11-0-0)	13
6	Mullens* (10-1-0)	0
7	Tyler County* (10-1-0)	40

Final
1	Sistersville* (12-0-0)	14
7	Tyler County* (11-1-0)	16

==== 1984 ====
Quarter-finals
1	Fayetteville* (10-0-0)	17
8	Van (9-1-0)	12
5	Mullens* (8-2-0)	24
4	Buffalo-Putnam (9-1-0)	2
3	Clay-Battelle (9-1-0)	0
6	Sistersville* (9-1-0)	40
7	Tyler County* (9-1-0)	8
2	Gilbert* (10-0-0)	22

Semi-finals
1	Fayetteville* (11-0-0)	27
5	Mullens* (9-2-0)	13
6	Sistersville* (10-1-0)	47
2	Gilbert* (11-0-0)	14

Final
1	Fayetteville* (12-0-0)	11
6	Sistersville (11-1-0) (5)	42

==== 1985 ====
Quarter-finals
1	Morgantown-St. Francis* (10-0-0)	35
8	Burch* (8-2-0)	0
5	Mount Hope* (9-1-0)	0
4	Peterstown* (9-1-0)	21
3	Gilbert* (9-1-0)	40
6	Tygarts Valley (9-1-0)	13
7	Buffalo-Putnam (9-1-0)	12
2	Sistersville* (9-1-0)	20

Semi-finals
1	Morgantown-St. Francis* (11-0-0)	27
4	Peterstown* (10-1-0)	6
3	Gilbert* (10-1-0)	0
2	Sistersville* (10-1-0)	17

Final
1	Morgantown-St. Francis* (12-0-0)	13
2	Sistersville* (11-1-0) (6)	22

==== 1986 ====
Quarter-finals
1	Sistersville* (9-0-0)	48
8	Gilbert* (8-2-0)	0
5	Van (9-1-0)	20
4	Mullens* (8-2-0)	14
3	Tyler County* (9-1-0)	48
6	Notre Dame-Clarksburg (8-2-0)	14
7	Pineville* (7-3-0)	24
2	Wahama (9-1-0)	25

Semi-finals
1	Sistersville* (10-0-0)	32
5	Van (10-1-0)	16
3	Tyler County* (10-1-0)	21
2	Wahama (10-1-0)	0

Final
1	Sistersville* (11-0-0) (7)	14
3	Tyler County (11-1-0)	0

==== 1987 ====
Quarter-finals
1	Weirton Madonna (10-0-0)	32
8	Mullens* (9-1-0)	6
5	Moorefield (8-1-0)	30
4	Wahama (9-1-0)	7
3	Tyler County* (10-0-0)	7
6	Guyan Valley* (9-1-0)	6
7	Matewan* (8-1-1)	22
2	Wirt County (9-1-0)	17

Semi-finals
1	Weirton Madonna (11-0-0)	34
5	Moorefield (9-1-0)	6
3	Tyler County* (11-0-0)	6
7	Matewan* (9-1-1)	8

Final
1	Weirton Madonna (12-0-0) (5)	22
7	Matewan* (10-1-1)	8

==== 1988 ====
Quarter-finals
1	Pineville* (10-0-0)	20
8	Wahama (8-2-0)	7
5	Buffalo-Putnam (8-2-0)	7
4	Guyan Valley* (10-0-0)	16
3	Tyler County* (10-0-0)	12
6	Meadow Bridge (9-1-0)	15
7	Wirt County (9-1-0)	0
2	Peterstown* (10-0-0)	60

Semi-finals
1	Pineville* (11-0-0)	24
4	Guyan Valley* (11-0-0)	6
6	Meadow Bridge (10-1-0)	32
2	Peterstown* (11-0-0)	20

Final
1	Pineville* (12-0-0)	6
6	Meadow Bridge (11-1-0) (2)	7

==== 1989 ====
Quarter-finals
1	Peterstown* (10-0-0)	34
8	Bishop Donahue* (7-3-0)	6
5	Vinson* (9-1-0)	19
4	Sistersville* (7-3-0)	34
3	Tygarts Valley (9-1-0)	12
6	Matewan* (7-3-0)	29
7	Mullens* (7-3-0)	0
2	Mt. Hope* (9-1-0)	18

Semi-finals
1	Peterstown* (11-0-0)	6
4	Sistersville* (8-3-0)	0
6	Matewan* (8-3-0)	8
2	Mt. Hope* (10-1-0)	10

Final
1	Peterstown* (12-0-0)	8
2	Mt. Hope* (11-1-0) (3)	32

==== 1990 ====
Quarter-finals
1	Duval* (10-0-0)	52
8	Union-Monroe (8-2-0)	19
5	Williamson (8-2-0)	0
4	Cameron (9-1-0)	6
3	Mullens* (9-1-0)	36
6	East Hardy (8-2-0)	8
7	Moorefield (7-2-0)	6
2	Peterstown* (9-1-0)	8

Semi-finals
1	Duval* (11-0-0)	30
4	Cameron (10-1-0)	10
3	Mullens* (10-1-0)	20
2	Peterstown* (10-1-0)	22

Final
1	Duval* (12-0-0) (3)	37
2	Peterstown (11-1-0)	20

=== 1991-2000 ===
(*school no longer exists)

==== 1991 ====
First round
1	Peterstown* (10-0-0)	56
16	Clear Fork* (6-4-0)	14
8	East Hardy (8-1-0)	24
9	Doddridge County (7-3-0)	6
5	Van (9-1-0)	36
12	Tyler County* (7-3-0)	15
4	Duval* (9-0-0)	42
13	Moorefield (7-2-0)	8
6	Union-Monroe* (7-3-0)	20
11	Cameron (9-1-0)	13
3	Matewan* (10-0-0)	21
14	Wahama (7-3-0)	13
7	Wirt County (9-1-0)	14
10	Valley-Wetzel (7-3-0)	20
2	Fayetteville* (10-0-0)	30
15	Meadow Bridge (6-4-0)	6

Quarter-finals
1	Peterstown*	30
8	East Hardy	0
4	Duval*	10
5	Van	7
6	Union-Monroe*	8
3	Matewan*	24
10	Valley-Wetzel	28
2	Fayetteville*	7

Semi-finals
1	Peterstown*	22
4	Duval*	11
3	Matewan*	12
10	Valley-Wetzel	6

Final
1	Peterstown*	26
3	Matewan*	21

==== 1992 ====
First Round
1	Fayetteville* (9-1-0)	21
16	Meadow Bridge (6-4-0)	0
8	Bishop Donahue* (8-2-0)	21
9	Peterstown* (7-3-0)	34
5	Valley-Wetzel (8-1-0)	14
12	Parkersburg Catholic (7-3-0)	0
4	Tyler County* (9-1-0)	28
13	Clay-Battelle (7-3-0)	0
6	Van (9-1-0)	21
11	East Hardy (7-3-0)	14
3	Wirt County (10-0-0)	13
14	Williamson* (6-4-0)	7
7	Mount Hope* 8-2-0)	22
10	Ceredo-Kenova* (7-3-0)	8
2	Matewan* (9-0-0)	26
15	Athens (7-3-0)	0

Quarter-finals
1	Fayetteville*	14
8	Peterstown*	0
4	Tyler County*	16
5	Valley-Wetzel	15
3	Wirt County	12
6	Van	41
2	Matewan*	14
7	Mount Hope*	6

Semi-finals
1	Fayetteville*	21
4	Tyler County*	14
2	Matewan*	20
6	Van	18

State Championship
1	Fayetteville*	15
2	Matewan*	9

==== 1993 ====
First Round
1	Valley-Wetzel (10-0-0)	13
16	Paden City (6-4-0)	6
8	Midland Trail (8-2-0)	19
9	Mount Hope* (6-3-0)	21
5	Ceredo-Kenova* (8-2-0)	8
12	Peterstown* (6-4-0)	3
4	Meadow Bridge (9-1-0)	51
13	East Hardy (7-3-0)	32
6	Van (7-2-0)	28
11	Wirt County (8-2-0)	12
3	Fayetteville* (9-1-0)	42
14	Doddridge County (6-4-0)	8
7	Gilbert* (7-3-0)	39
10	Athens* (8-2-0)	20
2	Matewan* (9-1-0)	40
15	Clay-Battelle (6-4-0)	6

Quarter-finals
1	Valley-Wetzel
9	Mount Hope*
4	Fayetteville*
3	Meadow Bridge
5	Ceredo-Kenova*
9	Gilbert*
2	Matewan*
6	Van

Semi-finals
Matewan*
Ceredo-Kenova*
Valley-Wetzel
Meadow Bridge

State Championship
1	Valley-Wetzel	13
2	Matewan*	21

==== 1994 ====
First Round
1	Ceredo-Kenova* (10-0-0)	38
16	Parkersburg Catholic (7-3-0)	7
8	Gilbert* (7-3-0)	12
9	East Hardy (9-1-0)	17
5	Matewan* (8-2-0)	24
12	Fayetteville* (6-4-0)	6
4	Mount Hope* (8-1-0)	20
13	Guyan Valley* (7-3-0)	8
6	Big Creek* (7-2-0)	25
11	Paden City (7-3-0)	0
3	St. Marys (7-3-0)	32
14	Buffalo-Putnam (6-4-0)	16
7	Franklin* (8-1-0)	13
10	Bishop Donahue* (7-3-0)	18
2	Valley-Wetzel (10-0-0)	27
15	Wirt County (6-4-0)	14

Quarterfinals
1	Ceredo-Kenova*	42
9	East Hardy	8
4	Mount Hope*	6
5	Matewan*	34
3	St. Marys	28
6	Big Creek*	0
2	Valley-Wetzel	21
10	Bishop Donahue*	6

Semifinals
1	Ceredo-Kenova*	30
5	Matewan*	0
2	Valley-Wetzel (OT)	13
3	St. Mary's	7

State Championship
1	Ceredo-Kenova* (11)	44
2	Valley-Wetzel	0

==== 1995 ====
First Round
1	Valley-Wetzel (10-0-0)	38
16	Franklin* (5-5-0)	6
8	Moorefield (8-2-0) (OT)	17
9	East Hardy (7-3-0)	14
5	Paden City (9-1-0)	6
12	Doddridge County (6-4-0)	0
4	Mount Hope* (9-1-0)	28
13	Big Creek* (6-4-0)	0
2	Matewan* (9-0-0)	32
15	Williamstown (5-5-0)	0
7	Buffalo-Putnam (8-2-0)	49
10	Parkersburg Catholic (8-2-0)	6
6	Gilbert* (7-3-0)	48
11	Vinson* (7-3-0)	6
3	Hamlin* (10-0-0)	22
14	Ceredo-Kenova* (5-5-0)	6

Quarter-finals
1	Valley-Wetzel	33
8	Moorefield	6
4	Mount Hope*	3
5	Paden City	0
2	Matewan*	50
7	Buffalo-Putnam	20
3	Hamlin*	6
6	Gilbert*	28

Semi-finals
1	Valley-Wetzel	40
4	Mount Hope*	27
2	Matewan*	8
6	Gilbert*	14

Finals
1	Valley-Wetzel	20
6	Gilbert*	28

==== 1996 ====
First Round
1	Gilbert* (10-0-0)	12
16	Wheeling Central (6-4-0)	6
8	Wahama (8-2-0)	41
9	Big Creek* (8-2-0)	14
5	Moorefield (8-1-0)	61
12	Van (9-1-0)	8
4	Mount Hope* (9-1-0)	24
13	Ceredo-Kenova* (7-3-0)	21
2	Midland Trail (8-2-0)	7
15	Buffalo-Putnam (7-3-0)	6
7	Parkersburg Catholic (9-1-0)	14
10	Matewan* (8-2-0)	40
3	Hamlin* (9-1-0)	0
14	Vinson* (6-4-0)	21
6	Valley-Wetzel (9-1-0)	26
11	East Hardy (7-2-0)	6

Quarter-finals
1	Gilbert*	29
8	Wahama	12
4	Mount Hope*	31
5	Moorefield	41
2	Midland Trail	28
10	Matewan*	6
14	Vinson*	6
6	Valley-Wetzel	29

Semi-finals
1	Gilbert*	20
5	Moorefield	30
2	Midland Trail	7
6	Valley-Wetzel	33

Finals
5	Moorefield	16
6	Valley-Wetzel	14

==== 1997 ====
First Round
1	Gilbert*	36
16	Meadow Bridge	6
8	Cameron	8
9	Parkersburg Catholic	28
4	Moorefield	57
13	Mullens*	0
5	Valley-Wetzel	26
12	Tygarts Valley	8
2	Ceredo-Kenova*	6
15	Guyan Valley*	12
7	Burch*	30
10	Franklin*	12
3	Big Creek* (2OT)	32
14	Clay-Battelle	26
6	East Hardy	40
11	Wahama	20

Quarter-finals
1	Gilbert*	28
9	Parkersburg Catholic	8
4	Moorefield	21
5	Valley-Wetzel	14
15	Guyan Valley*	16
7	Burch*	14
3	Big Creek*	6
6	East Hardy	0

Semi-finals
1	Gilbert*	9
4	Moorefield	13
15	Guyan Valley*	0
3	Big Creek*	15

State Championship
4	Moorefield (2)	15
3	Big Creek*	12

==== 1998 ====
First Round
1	Fayetteville*	35
16	Gauley Bridge*	0
8	Matewan*	26
9	Clay-Battelle	0
4	Gilbert*	7
13	Wahama	25
5	Bishop Donahue*	7
12	Valley-Wetzel	12
2	Moorefield	64
15	Williamson*	6
7	Parkersburg Catholic	33
10	Guyan Valley*	6
3	Cameron	28
14	Hamlin*	7
6	Buffalo-Putnam	0
11	Pendleton County	3

Quarter-finals
1	Fayetteville*	17
8	Matewan*	6
13	Wahama	6
12	Valley-Wetzel	12
2	Moorefield	48
7	Parkersburg Catholic	0
3	Cameron	24
11	Pendleton County	25

Semi-finals
1	Fayetteville*	0
12	Valley-Wetzel	7
2	Moorefield	39
11	Pendleton County	6

State Championship
12	Valley-Wetzel	9
2	Moorefield (3)	29

==== 1999 ====
First Round
1	Moorefield	46
16	Valley-Wetzel	7
8	Bishop Donahue*	11
9	Burch*	50
4	Valley-Fayette*	0
13	Matewan*	24
5	Buffalo-Putnam	6
12	Wheeling Central	28
2	Gilbert*	38
15	Gauley Bridge*	12
7	Fayetteville*	56
10	Williamson*	20
3	Cameron	6
14	Doddridge County	24
6	Parkersburg Catholic	34
11	East Hardy	18

Quarter-finals
1	Moorefield	61
9	Burch	14
13	Matewan*	22
12	Wheeling Central	40
2	Gilbert*	24
7	Fayetteville*	52
14	Doddridge County	23
6	Parkersburg Catholic	29

Semi-finals
1	Moorefield	30
12	Wheeling Central	7
7	Fayetteville*	55
6	Parkersburg Catholic	20

State Championship
1	Moorefield (4)	29
7	Fayetteville*	13

==== 2000 ====
First Round
1	Wheeling Central	42
16	Valley-Wetzel	20
8	Pendleton County	28
9	Valley-Fayette*	20
4	Fayetteville*	42
13	Oceana*	6
5	Matewan*	40
12	Burch*	22
2	Cameron	52
15	Gilbert*	22
7	Williamson*	20
10	Parkersburg Catholic	0
3	Buffalo-Putnam	47
14	Weirton-Madonna	7
6	Moorefield	28
11	East Hardy	18

Quarter-finals
1	Wheeling Central	61
8	Pendleton County	12
4	Fayetteville*	28
5	Matewan*	6
2	Cameron	26
7	Williamson*	0
3	Buffalo-Putnam	26
6	Moorefield	35

Semi-finals
1	Wheeling Central	42
4	Fayetteville*	14
2	Cameron	14
6	Moorefield	41

State Championship
1	Wheeling Central (7)	34
6	Moorefield	6

=== 2001-2010 ===
==== 2001 ====
First Round
1	Midland Trail	45
16	Guyan Valley*	6
8	Moorefield	46
9	Paden City	0
4	Van	48
13	Meadow Bridge	16
5	Parkersburg Catholic	7
12	Wahama	14
2	Wheeling Central	47
15	Buffalo-Putnam	14
7	Fayetteville*	6
10	Matewan*	28
3	Williamson*	40
14	Valley-Fayette*	18
6	Cameron	20
11	Mt Hope*	29

Quarter-finals
1	Midland Trail	16
8	Moorefield	50
4	Van	16
12	Wahama	40
2	Wheeling Central	28
10	Matewan*	0
3	Williamson*	46
11	Mt Hope*	20

Semi-finals
8	Moorefield	52
12	Wahama	12
2	Wheeling Central	36
3	Williamson*	14

State Championship
8	Moorefield (5)	13
2	Wheeling Central	0

==== 2002 ====
First Round
1	Williamstown (10-0)	46
16	Valley-Fayette* (6-4)	12
8	Williamson* (8-2)	22
9	Meadow Bridge (9-1)	28
4	Moorefield (9-1)	47
13	Midland Trail (7-3)	16
5	Tolsia (8-2)	41
12	Duval* (7-3)	8
2	Greenbrier West (9-1)	32
15	Valley-Wetzel (6-4)	6
7	Parkersburg Catholic (9-1)	33
10	Matewan* (8-2)	8
3	Wahama (10-0)	7
14	South Harrison (8-2)	12
6	Wheeling Central (8-2)	51
11	Sherman (7-3)	0

Quarter-finals
1	Williamstown	19
9	Meadow Bridge	14
4	Moorefield	21
5	Tolsia	6
2	Greenbrier West	14
7	Parkersburg Catholic	20
14	South Harrison	0
6	Wheeling Central	29

Semi-finals
1	Williamstown	7
4	Moorefield	41
7	Parkersburg Catholic	14
6	Wheeling Central	34

State Championship
4	Moorefield	7
6	Wheeling Central (OT) (8)	14

==== 2003 ====
First Round
1	Williamstown (10-0)	67
16	Gilbert* (6-3-1)	16
8	Greenbrier West (7-3)	21
9	Tucker County (7-3)	31
4	Parkersburg Catholic (9-1)	31
13	Pendleton County (8-2)	0
5	Tolsia (7-3)	20
12	Fayetteville* (7-3)	8
2	Moorefield (9-1)	48
15	Cameron (7-3)	6
7	Van (8-1)	6
10	Wheeling Central (7-3)	44
3	Wahama (10-0)	71
14	Doddridge County (8-2)	6
6	Clarksburg-Notre Dame* (9-1)	14
11	Matewan* (7-3)	20

Quarter-finals
1	Williamstown	54
9	Tucker County	6
4	Parkersburg Catholic	0
5	Tolsia	21
2	Moorefield	24
10	Wheeling Central	14
3	Wahama	34
11	Matewan*	20

Semi-finals
1	Williamstown	21
5	Tolsia	0
2	Moorefield	30
3	Wahama	6

State Championship
1	Williamstown	18
2	Moorefield (6)	20

Year	First round	Score		First round	Score	
2004	#1 Williamstown (9–0–0)	43–6	#16 Valley-Wetzel (7–3–0)	#9 Parkersburg Catholic (8–2–0)	38–7	#8 Buffalo-Putnam (8–2–0)
2004	#4 Weirton-Madonna (10–0–0)	47–0	#13 Matewan* (6–4–0)	#5 South Harrison (9–1–0)	35–8	#12 Clay-Battelle (8–2–0)
2004	#3 Matewan* (8–2–0)	42–13	#14 Tucker County (7–3–0)	#6 Moorefield (7–2–0)	41–0	#11 Guyan Valley* (7–3–0)
2004	#7 Wheeling Central (7–2–0)	58–26	#10 Gilbert* (7–3–0)	#2 Wahama (8–2–0)	55–0	#15 Pocahontas County (8–2–0)
2004	Quarter-finals	Score		Quarter-finals	Score	
2004	Williamstown	17–6	Parkersburg Catholic	Weirton-Madonna	25–7	South Harrison
2004	Moorefield	21–14(ot)	Matewan*	Wheeling Central	31–6	Wahama
2004	Semi-final	Score		Semi-final	Score	
2004	Weirton-Madonna	16–7	Williamstown	Wheeling Central	30–7	Moorefield
2004	Champion	Score	Runner-up			
2004	#7 Wheeling Central (9) (11–2–0)	34–7	#4 Weirton-Madonna (13–1–0)			
Year	First round	Score		First round	Score	
2005	#1 Williamstown (10–0–0)	67–0	#16 Tucker County (7–3–0)	#15 Wheeling Central (6–4–0)	41–26	#2 Greenbrier West (10–0–0)
2005	#3 Buffalo-Putnam (10–0–0)	26–15	#14 Midland Trail (7–3–0)	#4 South Harrison (9–1–0)	41–6	#13 Weirton-Madonna (8–2–0)
2005	#5 St. Marys (9–1–0)	36–20	#12 Clay-Battelle (8–2–0)	#6 Tygarts Valley (8–2–0)	35–28	#11 Calhoun County (8–2–0)
2005	#7 Parkersburg Catholic (7–3–0)	22–20	#10 Pocahontas County (8–2–0)	#9 Man (7–3–0)	14–0	#8 Hamlin* (9–1–0)
2005	Quarter-finals	Score		Quarter-finals	Score	
2005	Williamstown	26–12	Man	St. Marys	47–20	South Harrison
2005	Tygarts Valley	21–20	Buffalo-Putnam	Wheeling Central	21–6	Parkersburg Catholic
2005	Semi-final	Score		Semi-final	Score	
2005	Williamstown	17–0	St. Marys	Wheeling Central	24–13	Tygarts Valley
2005	Champion	Score	Runner-up			
2005	#15 Wheeling Central (10) (10–4–0)	35–20	#1 Williamstown (13–1–0)			
Year	First round	Score		First round	Score	
2006	#1 Wheeling Central (10–0–0)	62–18	#16 Parkersburg Catholic (6–4–0)	#8 St. Marys (9–1–0)	28–6	#9 East Hardy (8–2–0)
2006	#4 Greenbrier West (8–2–0)	22–16	#13 Buffalo-Putnam (6–4–0)	#12 Clarksburg-Notre Dame (7–3–0)	13–7	#5 Wahama (8–2–0)
2006	#2 Williamstown (10–0–0)	34–20	#15 South Harrison (6–4–0)	#10 Pendleton (7–3–0)	21–7	#7 Gilbert* (8–2–0)
2006	#3 Mt. Hope* (10–0–0)	52–0	#14 Meadow Bridge (7–3–0)	#6 Clay-Battelle (9–1–0)	28–8	#11 Tug Valley (8–2–0)
2006	Quarter-finals	Score		Quarter-finals	Score	
2006	Wheeling Central	42–14	St. Marys	Greenbrier West	30–0	Clarksburg-Notre Dame
2006	Williamstown	44–14	Pendleton County	Mt. Hope*	29–12	Clay-Battelle
2006	Semi-final	Score		Semi-final	Score	
2006	Wheeling Central	57–22	Greenbrier West	Williamstown	21–6	Mt. Hope*
2006	Champion	Score	Runner-up			
2006	#1 Wheeling Central (11) (14–0–0)	14–7	#2 Williamstown (13–1–0)			
Year	First round	Score		First round	Score	
2007	#1 Wheeling Central (10–0–0)	56–13	#16 Clarksburg-Notre Dame (7–3–0)	#9 Moorefield (7–3–0)	15–12	#8 Calhoun County (8–2–0)
2007	#5 Fayetteville* (8–2–0)	21–0	#12 Greenbrier West (7–3–0)	#4 Weirton-Madonna (9–1–0)	42–8	#13 Pendleton County (8–2–0)
2007	#14 Buffalo-Putnam (6–4–0)	34–6	#3 Gilbert* (9–1–0)	#11 St. Marys (8–2–0)	26–21	#6 Meadow Bridge (9–1–0)
2007	#7 Wahama (8–2–0)	26–14	#10 Pocahontas County (8–2–0)	#2 Williamstown (8–2–0)	34–14	#15 Midland Trail (7–3–0)
2007	Quarter-finals	Score		Quarter-finals	Score	
2007	Wheeling Central	55–33	Moorefield	Weirton-Madonna	28–21	Fayetteville*
2007	St. Marys	36–12	Buffalo-Putnam	Williamstown	48–3	Wahama
2007	Semi-final	Score		Semi-final	Score	
2007	Wheeling Central	47–6	Weirton-Madonna	Williamstown	23–0	St. Marys
2007	Champion	Score	Runner-up			
2007	#1 Wheeling Central (12) (14–0–0)	51–14	#2 Williamstown (12–2–0)			
Year	First round	Score		First round	Score	
2008	#1 Williamstown (9–1–0)	48–7	#16 Parkersburg Catholic (6–4–0)	#9 Man (7–3–0)	27–6	#8 Mt. Hope* (9–1–0)
2008	#4 Wheeling Central (8–2–0)	42–20	#13 Midland Trail (6–4–0)	#5 Matewan* (9–0–0)	25–13	#12 Moorefield (7–3–0)
2008	#2 Pocahontas County (10–0–0)	68–12	#15 Big Creek* (7–2–0)	#7 Weirton-Madonna (10–0–0)	16–0	#10 Calhoun County (7–3–0)
2008	#3 Fayetteville* (9–1–0)	35–33	#14 Tucker County (7–3–0)	#6 St. Marys (9–1–0)	25–14	#11 Clay-Battelle (8–2–0)
2008	Quarter-finals	Score		Quarter-finals	Score	
2008	Williamstown	21–16	Man	Wheeling Central	40–23	Matewan*
2008	Weirton-Madonna	16–14	Pocahontas County	St. Marys	56–36	Fayetteville*
2008	Semi-final	Score		Semi-final	Score	
2008	Williamstown	14–13	Wheeling Central	Weirton-Madonna	27–6	St. Marys
2008	Champion	Score	Runner-up			
2008	#1 Williamstown (13–1–0)	23–7	#7 Weirton-Madonna (13–1–0)			
Year	First round	Score		First round	Score	
2009	#1 Weirton-Madonna (10–0–0)	48–6	#16 Gilbert* (6–3–0)	#9 Tucker County (8–2–0)	36–18	#8 Clay-Battelle (9–1–0)
2009	#4 Williamstown (8–2–0)	62–6	#13 Valley-Fayette* (7–3–0)	#5 Wheeling Central (7–3–0)	47–6	#12 Moorefield (7–3–0)
2009	#2 Man (9–1–0)	25–20	#15 Parkersburg Catholic (7–3–0)	#7 Fayetteville* (8–2–0)	23–20	#10 Wahama (8–2–0)
2009	#3 Richwood (10–0–0)	44–26	#14 Pendleton County (7–3–0)	#6 Wirt County (8–2–0)	34–12	#11 Iaeger* (8–2–0)
2009	Quarter-finals	Score		Quarter-finals	Score	
2009	Weirton-Madonna	48–0	Tucker County	Wheeling Central	28–14	Williamstown
2009	Man	37–26	Fayetteville*	Richwood	44–26	Wirt County
2009	Semi-final	Score		Semi-final	Score	
2009	Weirton-Madonna	18–7	Wheeling Central	Man	27–20	Richwood
2009	Champion	Score	Runner-up			
2009	#1 Weirton-Madonna (6) (14–0–0)	27–7	#2 Man (12–2–0)			
Year	First round	Score		First round	Score	
2010	#1 Wahama (10–0–0)	19–0	#16 St. Marys (6–4–0)	#9 East Hardy (7–3–0)	30–12	#8 Tucker County (7–3–0)
2010	#4 Wirt County (8–2–0)	38–24	#13 Weirton-Madonna (8–2–0)	#5 Williamstown (8–2–0)	42–21	#12 Fayetteville* (7–3–0)
2010	#2 Meadow Bridge (10–0–0)	54–30	#15 Parkersburg Catholic (7–3–0)	#7 Matewan* (8–2–0)	40–34	#10 Buffalo-Putnam (7–3–0)
2010	#3 Bishop Donahue* (10–0–0)	34–14	#14 Pocahontas County (6–4–0)	#6 Wheeling Central (6–4–0)	48–7	#11 Pendleton County (7–3–0)
2010	Quarter-finals	Score		Quarter-finals	Score	
2010	Wahama	73–38	East Hardy	Wirt County	13–10	Williamstown
2010	Matewan*	54–16	Meadow Bridge	Wheeling Central	24–20	Bishop Donahue*
2010	Semi-final	Score		Semi-final	Score	
2010	Wahama	31–14	Wirt County	Wheeling Central	34–12	Matewan*
2010	Champion	Score	Runner-up			
2010	#6 Wheeling Central (13) (10–4–0)	28–14	#1 Wahama (13–1–0)			

=== 2011-2020 ===
==== 2011 ====
First Round
1	Wheeling Central	39
16	Parkersburg Catholic	14
8	Clay-Battelle	13
9	Moorefield	42
4	Wirt County	19
13	Bishop Donahue*	42
5	East Hardy	48
12	Buffalo-Putnam	15
2	Williamstown	38
15	Madonna	31
7	Valley-Fayette*	22
10	Meadow Bridge	6
3	Wahama	31
14	Pocahontas County	20
6	Fayetteville*	35
11	Van	0

Quarter-finals
1	Wheeling Central	34
9	Moorefield	16
5	Bishop Donahue*	26
13	East Hardy	40
2	Williamstown	45
7	Valley-Fayette*	8
6	Wahama	45
3	Fayetteville*	20

Semi-finals
1	Wheeling Central	37
5	East Hardy	14
2	Williamstown	24
3	Wahama	7

State Championship
1	Wheeling Central (14)	35
2	Williamstown	21

==== 2012 ====
First Round
1	Tucker County (10-0)	27
16	Moorefield (5-4)	14
8	Clay-Battelle (9-1)	33
9	Valley-Fayette* (8-2)	28
4	Weirton-Madonna (9-1)	58
13	Tug Valley (8-2)	12
5	St. Mary's (9-1)	40
12	Wirt County (7-3)	14
2	Magnolia (9-1)	34
15	Williamstown (6-4)	7
7	East Hardy (9-1)	60
10	Wheeling Central (7-3)	34
3	Wahama (10-0)	38
14	Buffalo-Putnam (7-3)	0
6	Greenbrier West (9-1)	48
11	Meadow Bridge (8-2)	6

Quarter-finals
1	Tucker County	48
8	Clay-Battelle	14
4	Weirton-Madonna	29
5	St. Mary's	14
2	Magnolia	19
7	East Hardy	14
3	Wahama	21
6	Greenbrier West	12

Semi-finals
1	Tucker County	14
4	Weirton-Madonna (OT)	20
2	Magnolia	7
3	Wahama	10

State Championship
4	Weirton-Madonna	42
3	Wahama (OT)	43

==== 2013 ====
First Round
1	Weirton-Madonna (10-0)	52
16	Tucker County (6-4)	0
8	Wahama (9-1)	49
9	Clay-Battelle (8-1)	27
4	Williamstown (8-2)	27
13	Wheeling Central (6-4)	25
5	Man (9-1)	18
12	Bishop Donahue* (7-3)	21
2	St. Mary's (10-0)	21
15	East Hardy (7-3)	6
7	Greenbrier West (9-1)	54
10	Clarksburg-Notre Dame* (7-3)	7
3	Valley-Fayette* (10-0)	14
14	Magnolia (6-4)	42
6	Moorefield (9-1)	22
11	Meadow Bridge (8-2)	16

Quarter-finals
1	Weirton-Madonna	77
8	Wahama	50
4	Williamstown	54
12	Bishop Donahue*	12
2	St. Mary's	0
7	Greenbrier West	18
14	Magnolia	37
6	Moorefield	7

Semi-finals
1	Weirton-Madonna	42
4	Williamstown	28
7	Greenbrier West	21
14	Magnolia	14

State Championship
1	Weirton-Madonna (7)	24
7	Greenbrier West	14

==== 2014 ====
First Round
1	St. Mary's (10-0)	40
16	Wahama (6-4)	20
8	Tyler Consolidated (7-3)	24
9	Moorefield (8-2)	44
4	Clay-Battelle (9-1)	14
13	Greenbrier West (6-4)	7
5	Meadow Bridge (9-1)	14
12	Bishop Donahue* (8-2)	17
2	Tug Valley (9-1)	16
15	Man (6-4)	12
7	Doddridge County (8-2)	0
10	Buffalo-Putnam (8-2)	20
3	Clarksburg-Notre Dame* (8-2)	22
14	East Hardy (7-3)	30
6	Williamstown (8-2)	24
11	Pendleton County (7-3)	0

Quarter-finals
1	St. Mary's	36
9	Moorefield	0
4	Clay-Battelle	30
12	Bishop Donahue*	20
2	Tug Valley	36
10	Buffalo-Putnam	19
14	East Hardy	22
6	Williamstown	44

Semi-finals
1	St. Mary's	20
4	Clay-Battelle	14
2	Tug Valley	28
6	Williamstown	42

State Championship
1	St. Mary's	32
6	Williamstown (2) (3OT)	33

==== 2015 ====
First Round
1	Magnolia (10-0)	54
16	Van (7-3)	22
8	Williamstown (8-2)	21
9	Pocahontas County (8-2)	14
4	Moorefield (9-1)	42
13	Meadow Bridge (7-3)	20
5	Man (8-2)	28
12	Tug Valley (7-3)	38
2	East Hardy (9-1)	23
15	Bishop Donahue* (7-3)	20
7	Wheeling Central (9-1)	42
10	Pendleton County (7-3)	28
3	South Harrison (9-1)	53
14	Valley-Wetzel (7-3)	12
6	Buffalo-Putnam (10-0)	21
11	St. Mary's (8-2)	23

Quarter-finals
1	Magnolia	14
8	Williamstown	13
4	Moorefield	55
12	Tug Valley	26
2	East Hardy	16
7	Wheeling Central	14
3	South Harrison	0
11	St. Mary's	37

Semi-finals
1	Magnolia	13
4	Moorefield	7
2	East Hardy	36
11	St. Mary's	19

State Championship
1	Magnolia (4)	62
2	East Hardy	0

==== 2016 ====
First Round
1	East Hardy (10-0)	54
16	Tyler Consolidated (6-4)	22
8	Williamstown (8-2)	55
9	South Harrison (9-1)	27
4	Tolsia (7-2)	26
13	Tug Valley (7-3)	20
5	Cameron (10-0)	30
12	Pendleton County (8-2)	50
2	St. Mary's (10-0)	49
15	Buffalo-Putnam (7-3)	7
7	Gilmer County (10-0)	34
10	Summers County (8-2)	20
3	Fayetteville* (10-0)	28
14	Van (6-4)	0
6	Wheeling Central (8-1)	45
11	Sherman (8-2)	8

Quarter-finals
1	East Hardy	20
8	Williamstown	14
4	Tolsia	16
12	Pendleton County	46
2	St. Mary's	47
7	Gilmer County	0
3	Fayetteville*	27
6	Wheeling Central	20

Semi-finals
1	East Hardy	48
12	Pendleton County	20
2	St. Mary's	47
3	Fayetteville*	0

State Championship
1	East Hardy	8
2	St. Mary's (2)	23

==== 2017 ====
First Round
1	East Hardy (10-0)	14
16	Williamstown (5-4)	10
8	Weirton-Madonna (8-2)	14
9	Sherman (8-2)	37
4	Tug Valley (9-1)	30
13	Pocahontas County (7-3)	29
5	St. Mary's (8-1)	44
12	Doddridge County (8-2)	14
2	South Harrison (9-1)	58
15	Richwood (6-4)	19
7	Cameron (9-1)	20
10	Wheeling Central (6-4)	34
3	Midland Trail (9-1)	35
14	Fayetteville* (6-4)	7
6	Webster County (9-1)	0
11	Summers County (6-4)	28

Quarter-finals
1	East Hardy	42
9	Sherman	14
4	Tug Valley	0
5	St. Mary's	47
2	South Harrison	6
10	Wheeling Central	39
3	Midland Trail	0
11	Summers County	6

Semi-finals
1	East Hardy	21
5	St. Mary's	27
10	Wheeling Central	42
11	Summers County	14

State Championship
5	St. Mary's	21
10	Wheeling Central (15)	40

==== 2018 ====
First Round
1	Wheeling Central (9-1)	61
16	Tyler Consolidated (6-4)	30
8	Pendleton County (8-2)	6
9	Magnolia (7-3)	28
4	Doddridge County (10-0)	40
13	Webster County (6-4)	14
5	Cameron (10-0)	30
12	Van (8-2)	12
2	Midland Trail (10-0)	14
15	Tucker County (6-4)	2
7	Sherman (9-1)	44
10	Parkersburg Catholic (9-1)	8
3	Mt. View (9-1)	34
14	Ritchie County (7-3)	14
6	Williamstown (8-2)	27
11	Summers County (7-3)	12

Quarter-finals
1	Wheeling Central	40
9	Magnolia	19
4	Doddridge County	27
5	Cameron	0
2	Midland Trail	20
7	Sherman	14
3	Mt. View	12
6	Williamstown	23

Semi-finals
1	Wheeling Central	47
4	Doddridge County	7
2	Midland Trail	8
6	Williamstown	56

State Championship
1	Wheeling Central (16)	44
6	Williamstown	15

==== 2019 ====
First Round
1	Doddridge County (10-0)	57
16	Weirton-Madonna (6-3-1)	7
8	East Hardy (7-3)	12
9	Midland Trail (6-4)	7
4	Greenbrier West (9-1)	52
13	Tygarts Valley (7-3)	13
5	Williamstown (8-2)	42
12	Tug Valley (6-3)	0
2	Ritchie County (9-1)	40
15	South Harrison (6-4)	6
7	Tolsia (7-3)	12
10	Wheeling Central (6-4)	13
3	Pendleton County (9-1)	26
14	Moorefield (6-4)	7
6	Cameron (7-3)	28
11	St. Mary's (8-2)	51

Quarter-finals
1	Doddridge County	21
8	East Hardy	6
4	Greenbrier West	22
5	Williamstown	34
2	Ritchie County	0
10	Wheeling Central	13
3	Pendleton County	13
11	St. Mary's	2

Semi-finals
1	Doddridge County	27
5	Williamstown	3
10	Wheeling Central	27
3	Pendleton County	7

State Championship
1	Doddridge County	21
10	Wheeling Central (17)	38

In 2020 the COVID-19 epidemic effected the football season greatly. Health officials developed a map, which was published each Saturday, and used to determine which counties could participate in WVSSAC activities the upcoming week.

==== 2020 ====
First Round

November 15, 2020

Quarter-finals

November 21, 2020

Semi-finals

November 28, 2020

State Championship

December 5, 2020

Wheeling Island Stadium, Wheeling WV

1
Tug Valley
0

16
Tygarts Valley
1

16
Tygarts Valley
17

8
Pendleton County
41

8
Pendleton County
14

9
Moorefield
7

8
Pendleton County
7

4
St. Marys
21

4
St. Marys
1

13
Wheeling Central
0

4
St. Marys
52

5
Midland Trail
49

5
Midland Trail
1

12
Buffalo
0

4
St. Marys (3)
1

7
Ritchie County
0

2
Greenbrier West
58

15
Madonna
0

2
Greenbrier West
29

7
Ritchie County
38

7
Ritchie County
16

10
Wirt County
7

7
Ritchie County

BYE

3
Doddridge County
19

14
East Hardy
25

14
East Hardy
F

11
Tolsia
F

6
Williamstown
0

11
Tolsia
1

=== 2021-2023 ===
==== 2021 ====
First Round

November 12-13, 2021

Quarter-finals

November 19-20, 2021

Semi-finals

November 26-27, 2021

State Championship

December 4, 2021

Wheeling Island Stadium, Wheeling, WV

1
Cameron (9-1-0)
14

16
Gilmer County (6-4-0)
19

16
Gilmer County
0

8
Wheeling Central
55

8
Wheeling Central (7-3-0)
35

9
Moorefield (7-3-0)
7

8
Wheeling Central
16

4
Ritchie County
20

4
Ritchie County (9-1-0)
46

13
Clay-Battelle (8-2-0)
14

4
Ritchie County
34

5
Mount View
6

5
Mount View (9-1-0)
18

12
Sherman (6-4-0)
6

4
Ritchie County
42

6
Williamstown
21

2
Doddridge County (9-1-0)
40

15
Midland Trail (6-4-0)
21

2
Doddridge County
14

7
James Monroe
0

7
James Monroe (7-3-0)
32

10
Trinity-Morgantown (7-3-0)
0

2
Doddridge County
0

6
Williamstown
43

3
East Hardy (9-1-0)
45

14
Meadow Bridge (6-4-0)
6

3
East Hardy
24

6
Williamstown
44

6
Williamstown (8-2-0)
48

11
Greenbrier West (6-4-0)
20

==== 2022 ====
First Round

November 11, 2022

Quarter-finals

November 18, 2022

Semi-finals

November 25, 2022

State Championship

December 3, 2022

Wheeling Island Stadium, Wheeling, WV

1
James Monroe (10-0-0)
37

16
Petersburg (7-3-0)
13

1
James Monroe
48

8
Greenbrier West
13

8
Greenbrier West (8-1-0)
35

9
South Harrison (7-3-0)
0

1
James Monroe
27

4
Wheeling Central
7

4
Wheeling Central (8-1-0)
41

13
Man (7-3-0)
7

4
Wheeling Central
48

5
Wahama
14

5
Wahama (10-0-0)
52

12
St. Marys (7-3-0)
21

1
James Monroe
20

6
Williamstown (3)
52

2
Cameron (10-0-0)
20

15
Tyler Consolidated (6-3-0)
6

2
Cameron
6

10
Doddridge County
21

7
Van (10-0-0)
0

10
Doddridge County (8-2-0)
43

10
Doddridge County
21

6
Williamstown
53

3
Tucker County (9-1-0)
6

14
East Hardy (8-2-0)
34

14
East Hardy
6

6
Williamstown
49

6
Williamstown (9-1-0)
49

11
Clay-Battelle (8-2-0)
6

==== 2023 ====
First Round

November 10, 2023

Quarter-finals

November 17, 2023

Semi-finals

November 24, 2023

State Championship

December 2, 2023

Wheeling Island Stadium, Wheeling, WV

1
James Monroe (9-1-0)
48

16
Sherman (6-4-0)
15

1
James Monroe
17

8
Cameron
0

8
Cameron (9-1-0)
40

9
Man (7-3-0)
8

1
James Monroe
7

4
Greenbrier West
27

4
Greenbrier West (10-0-0)
49

13
Wirt County (6-4-0)
0

4
Greenbrier West
22

5
Wahama
20

5
Wahama (10-0-0)
65

12
Summers County (6-4-0)
14

4
Greenbrier West
12

3
Williamstown (4)
42

2
Tucker County (10-0-0)
46

15
Midland Trail (5-5-0)
6

2
Tucker County
42

7
Tug Valley
0

7
Tug Valley (8-2-0)
28

10
Tyler Consolidated (8-2-0)
26

2
Tucker County
8

3
Williamstown
45

3
Williamstown (10-0-0)
49

14
Doddridge County (6-4-0)
6

3
Williamstown
48

11
East Hardy
15

6
St. Mary's (9-1-0)
30

11
East Hardy (6-3-0)
38

== Class AA ==
=== Two-Team Playoff (1958–1971) ===
(*school no longer exists)

Year	Champion	Score	Runner-up
1958	Roosevelt Wilson* (7–2–0)	19–12	Sissonville (6–4–0)
1959	Mt. Hope* (8–1–2) (Note: Merged into Oak Hill High School in 2011.) and Mullens* (2) (8–2–1)	0–0	Co-champions
1960	Mt. Hope* (2) (9–0–2) and Williamson* (3) (9–1–1)	7–7	Co-champions
1961	Williamson* (4) (9–2–0)	20–13	Mt. Hope* (10–1–0)
1962	Keyser (2) (10–1–0)	35–20	Nicholas County (9–1–0)
1963	Ceredo-Kenova* (9–2–0) (Note: consolidated with Buffalo-Wayne and Vinson to form Spring Valley High School (West Virginia))	19–13	Hinton* (8–2–1)
1964	Magnolia (2) (8–3–0)	15–7	Mt. Hope* (8–3–0)
1965	Ceredo-Kenova* (2) (11–0–0)	26–6	Mt. Hope* (8–2–0)
1966	Gary* (9–2–0)	33–14	Ceredo-Kenova* (9–2–0)
1967	Ceredo-Kenova* (3) (11–0–0)	47–13	Monongah* (10–1–0)
1968	Hinton* (2) (10–1–0)	9–0	Oceana* (9–2–0) (Note: Consolidated into Westside High School in 2002.)
1969	Keyser (3) (10–1–0)	21–20	Winfield (10–1–0)
1970	Gary* (2) (11–0–0)	33–14	Oceana* (10–1–0)
1971	Ceredo-Kenova* (4) (9–1–1)	14–8	Oceana* (9–2–0)

=== Four-Team Playoff (1972–1977) ===
(*school no longer exists)

==== 1972 ====
Semi-finals
1	Magnolia	26
4	Scott	16
3	Ravenswood	35
2	Ceredo-Kenova*	14

State Championship
1	Magnolia	6
2	Ravenswood (3)	14

==== 1973 ====
Semi-finals
1	Northfork*	14
4	Vinson*	7
2	Magnolia	6
3	Ceredo-Kenova*	12

Finals
1	Northfork*	14
3	Ceredo-Kenova*	13

==== 1974 ====
Semi-finals
1	Ceredo-Kenova*	28
4	Montgomery*	12
2	Northfork*	32
3	Stoco*	0

State Championship
1	Ceredo-Kenova* (5)	34
2	Northfork*	14

==== 1975 ====
Semi-finals
1	Ceredo-Kenova* (OT)	6
4	Vinson*	0
2	Doddridge County	0
3	Sherman	40

State Championship
1	Ceredo-Kenova* (6)	18
3	Sherman	6

==== 1976 ====
Semi-finals
1	Big Creek*	28
4	Greenbrier West	6
2	Ravenswood	28
3	Winfield	0

State Championship
1	Big Creek*	7
2	Ravenswood (4)	15

==== 1977 ====
Semi-finals
1	Poca	20
4	Ceredo-Kenova*	6
2	Man (OT)	14
3	Greenbrier West	8

State Championship
1	Poca	20
2	Man	6

=== Eight-Team Playoff (1978–1990) ===
(*school no longer exists)

Year	Quarter-finals	Score		Quarter-finals	Score	
1978	#3 Ceredo-Kenova* (9–1–0)	22–6	#6 Magnolia (8–2–0)	#1 Poca (10–0–0)	7–3	#8 Ravenswood (7–3–0)
1978	#2 Man (9–1–0)	28–20	#7 Greenbrier West (8–2–0)	#5 Central Preston* (9–1–0)	15–12	#4 Wayne (8–2–0)
1978	Semi-final	Score		Semi-final	Score	
1978	Ceredo-Kenova*	28–7	Man	Poca	39–0	Central Preston*
1978	Champion	Score	Runner-up			
1978	#3 Ceredo-Kenova* (7) (12–1–0)	21–6	#1 Poca (12–1–0)			
Year	Quarter-finals	Score		Quarter-finals	Score	
1979	#2 Wheeling Central (9–1–0)	28–25	#7 Poca (7–2–0)	#1 Buffalo-Wayne* (10–0–0)	21–19	#8 Williamstown (8–2–0)
1979	#5 Man (8–2–0)	21–7	#4 Iaeger* (10–0–0)	#3 Big Creek* (8–1–0)	14–6	#6 Central Preston* (9–1–0)
1979	Semi-final	Score		Semi-final	Score	
1979	Wheeling Central	31–0	Big Creek*	Buffalo-Wayne*	20–0	Man
1979	Champion	Score	Runner-up			
1979	#2 Wheeling Central (6) (12–1–0)	39–21	#1 Buffalo Wayne* (12–1–0)			
Year	Quarter-finals	Score		Quarter-finals	Score	
1980	#1 Ceredo-Kenova* (9–1–0)	26–6	#8 Valley-Fayette* (8–2–0)	#2 Man (9–1–0)	21–6	#7 Hinton* (9–1–0)
1980	#3 Poca (9–1–0)	21–7	#6 University (8–2–0)	#5 Big Creek* (9–1–0)	30–0	#4 Midland Trail (9–1–0)
1980	Semi-final	Score		Semi-final	Score	
1980	Man	28–14	Poca	Ceredo-Kenova*	21–6	Big Creek*
1980	Champion	Score	Runner-up			
1980	#1 Ceredo-Kenova* (8) (12–1–0)	18–13	#2 Man (11–2–0)			
Year	Quarter-finals	Score		Quarter-finals	Score	
1981	#1 Magnolia (9–1–0)	55–6	#8 Poca (8–2–0)	#2 Musselman (9–1–0)	36–8	#7 Iaeger* (10–0–0)
1981	#3 Ceredo-Kenova* (9–1–0)	21–6	#6 Greenbrier West (9–1–0)	#5 Man (9–1–0)	26–0	#4 Milton* (8–2–0)
1981	Semi-final	Score		Semi-final	Score	
1981	Magnolia	22–19(ot)	Man	Ceredo-Kenova*	26–6	Musselman
1981	Champion	Score	Runner-up			
1981	#3 Ceredo-Kenova* (9) (12–1–0)	22–15	#1 Magnolia (11–2–0)			
Year	Quarter-finals	Score		Quarter-finals	Score	
1982	#1 Greenbrier West (10–0–0)	26–0	#8 Northfork* (8–2–0)	#2 Musselman (10–0–0)	26–21	#7 South Harrison (9–1–0)
1982	#3 Central Preston* (9–1–0)	20–6	#6 Winfield (9–1–0)	#5 Ceredo-Kenova* (8–2–0)	20–8	#4 Richwood (9–1–0)
1982	Semi-final	Score		Semi-final	Score	
1982	Ceredo-Kenova*	9–6	Greenbrier West	Musselman	24–0	Central Preston*
1982	Champion	Score	Runner-up			
1982	#2 Musselman (2) (13–0–0)	12–7	#5 Ceredo-Kenova* (10–3–0)			
Year	Quarter-finals	Score		Quarter-finals	Score	
1983	#1 Grafton (9–1–0)	31–13	#8 Calhoun County (9–1–0)	#7 Ceredo-Kenova* (8–2–0)	14–8	#2 Greenbrier West (10–0–0)
1983	#3 Winfield (9–1–0)	37–30	#6 Magnolia (8–2–0)	#4 Musselman (8–1–1)	28–8	#5 Frankfort (9–1–0)
1983	Semi-final	Score		Semi-final	Score	
1983	Musselman	40–7	Grafton	Ceredo-Kenova*	30–8	Winfield
1983	Champion	Score	Runner-up			
1983	#7 Ceredo-Kenova* (10) (11–2–0)	34–15	#4 Musselman (10–2–1)			
Year	Quarter-finals	Score		Quarter-finals	Score	
1984	#1 Man (9–1–0)	38–0	#8 Big Creek* (7–1–0)	#7 Grafton (8–2–0)	27–22	#2 Winfield (9–1–0)
1984	#3 Bridgeport (8–2–0)	13–7	#6 Buffalo-Wayne* (9–1–0)	#5 St. Marys (10–0–0)	28–0	#4 Musselman (8–1–0)
1984	Semi-final	Score		Semi-final	Score	
1984	Man	34–0	St. Marys	Grafton	7–6	Bridgeport
1984	Champion	Score	Runner-up			
1984	#7 Grafton (3) (11–2–0)	14–10	#1 Man (11–2–0)			
Year	Quarter-finals	Score		Quarter-finals	Score	
1985	#1 Winfield (10–0–0)	47–14	#8 Poca (7–3–0)	#2 Buffalo-Wayne* (10–0–0)	12–8	#7 Oceana* (8–2–0)
1985	#3 Bridgeport (9–1–0)	20–0	#6 Spencer* (8–1–0)	#5 Tucker County (8–2–0)	21–20	#4 Chapmanville (10–0–0)
1985	Semi-finals	Score		Semi-final	Score	
1985	Winfield	12–0	Tucker County	Buffalo-Wayne*	20–0	Bridgeport
1985	Champion	Score	Runner-up			
1985	#1 Winfield (13–0–0)	28–6	#2 Buffalo Wayne* (12–1–0)			
Year	Quarter-finals	Score		Quarter-finals	Score	
1986	#1 Bridgeport (9–1–0)	21–13	#8 Magnolia (7–3–0)	#2 Independence (10–0–0)	12–0	#7 Man (7–3–0)
1986	#3 Tucker County (9–1–0)	34–13	#6 Valley-Fayette* (9–1–0)	#5 Winfield (9–1–0)	23–21	#4 Chapmanville (10–0–0)
1986	Semi-final	Score		Semi-final	Score	
1986	Bridgeport	10–8	Winfield	Tucker County	20–19	Independence
1986	Champion	Score	Runner-up			
1986	#1 Bridgeport (4) (12–1–0)	10–7	#3 Tucker County (11–2–0)			
Year	Quarter-finals	Score		Quarter-finals	Score	
1987	#1 Winfield (10–0–0)	29–7	#8 University (8–2–0)	#7 Bridgeport (7–3–0)	13–0	#2 Greenbrier West (10–0–0)
1987	#3 Tucker County (9–1–0)	22–13	#6 Sissonville (8–2–0)	#5 Grafton (8–2–0)	17–14	#4 Buffalo-Wayne* (9–1–0)
1987	Semi-final	Score		Semi-final	Score	
1987	Winfield	42–6	Grafton	Tucker County	26–20(ot)	Bridgeport
1987	Champion	Score	Runner-up			
1987	#1 Winfield (2) (13–0–0)	48–14	#3 Tucker County (11–2–0)			
Year	Quarter-finals	Score		Quarter-finals	Score	
1988	#1 Bridgeport (10–0–0)	22–0	#8 East Bank* (7–3–0)	#2 Magnolia (9–1–0)	35–21	#7 Sissonville (8–2–0)
1988	#3 Winfield (9–1–0)	33–7	#6 Buffalo-Wayne* (9–1–0)	#4 Musselman (9–1–0)	14–7	#5 Ceredo-Kenova* (9–1–0)
1988	Semi-final	Score		Semi-final	Score	
1988	Bridgeport	35–0	Musselman	Winfield	27–19	Magnolia
1988	Champion	Score	Runner-up			
1988	#1 Bridgeport (5) (13–0–0)	29–28 (4OT)	#3 Winfield (11–2–0)			
Year	Quarter-finals	Score		Quarter-finals	Score	
1989	#1 Man (8–0–0)	35–7	#8 Grafton (8–2–0)	#2 Bridgeport (10–0–0)	27–8	#7 Frankfort (9–1–0)
1989	#3 Musselman (10–0–0)	42–20	#6 Midland Trail (9–1–0)	#4 East Bank* (9–1–0)	34–7	#5 Williamstown (10–0–0)
1989	Semi-final	Score		Semi-final	Score	
1989	East Bank*	15–14	Man	Musselman	14–7	Bridgeport
1989	Champion	Score	Runner-up			
1989	#4 East Bank* (4) (12–1–0) (Note: Consolidated into Riverside High School in 1999.)	14–9	#3 Musselman (12–1–0)			
Year	Quarter-finals	Score		Quarter-finals	Score	
1990	#1 East Bank (10–0–0)	35–6	#8 Midland Trail (9–1–0)	#2 Spencer* (10–0–0)	24–8	#7 Frankfort (10–0–0)
1990	#3 Oceana* (9–1–0)	16–13	#6 Bridgeport (8–2–0)	#5 Wheeling Central (10–0–0)	13–10	#4 Grafton (9–1–0)
1990	Semi-final	Score		Semi-final	Score	
1990	East Bank*	28–10	Wheeling Central	Spencer*	16–8	Oceana*
1990	Champion	Score	Runner-up			
1990	#1 East Bank* (5) (13–0–0)	15–12	#2 Spencer* (12–1–0) (Note: Consolidated into Roane County High School in 1993.)			

=== Sixteen-Team Playoff (1991–2023) ===
==== 1991-2000 ====
(*school no longer exists)

Year	First round	Score		First round	Score	
1991	#1 Spencer* (10–0–0)	37–0	#16 Grafton (6–4–0)	#9 Sherman (8–2–0)	22–11	#8 Musselman (8–2–0)
1991	#4 Buffalo-Wayne* (10–0–0)	46–6	#13 Clay County (8–2–0)	#5 Wheeling Central (9–1–0)	26–8	#12 Gilbert* (7–2–0)
1991	#2 Magnolia (9–1–0)	26–0	#15 Sissonville (7–3–0)	#7 Bridgeport (7–3–0)	3–0	#10 Frankfort (7–3–0)
1991	#3 Greenbrier West (10–0–0)	22–0	#14 Independence (6–4–0)	#6 East Bank* (7–3–0)	7–0	#11 Man (7–3–0)
1991	Quarter-finals	Score		Quarter-finals	Score	
1991	Spencer*	38–0	Sherman	Buffalo-Wayne*	19–0	Wheeling Central
1991	Magnolia	16–3	Bridgeport	Greenbrier West	27–0	East Bank*
1991	Semi-final	Score		Semi-final	Score	
1991	Spencer*	35–14	Buffalo-Wayne*	Greenbrier West	6–0	Magnolia
1991	Champion	Score	Runner-up			
1991	#1 Spencer* (14–0–0)	31–22	#3 Greenbrier West (13–1–0)			
Year	First round	Score		First round	Score	
1992	#1 South Harrison (10–0–0)	35–0	#16 Grafton (6–4–0)	#3 Magnolia (10–0–0)	28–0	#14 Richwood (7–3–0)
1992	#15 Pocahontas County (7–3–0)	26–7	#2 Musselman (10–0–0)	#4 East Bank* (8–2–0)	14–8	#13 Ritchie County (8–2–0)
1992	#12 Wheeling Central (7–3–0)	30–0	#5 Greenbrier West (9–1–0)	#11 Poca (7–3–0)	12–6	#6 Clay County (9–1–0)
1992	#7 Sissonville (8–2–0)	21–0	#10 Iaeger* (9–1–0)	#8 Buffalo-Wayne* (8–2–0)	19–0	#9 Webster County (7–3–0)
1992	Quarter-finals	Score		Quarter-finals	Score	
1992	Buffalo-Wayne*	7–6	South Harrison	Sissonville	17–6	Pocahontas County
1992	Magnolia	31–16	Poca	East Bank*	29–27	Wheeling Central
1992	Semi-final	Score		Semi-final	Score	
1992	Buffalo-Wayne*	6–0	East Bank*	Magnolia	24–0	Sissonville
1992	Champion	Score	Runner-up			
1992	#8 Buffalo Wayne* (12–2–0)	7–3	#3 Magnolia (13–1–0)			
Year	First round	Score		First round	Score	
1993	#6 Tyler Consolidated (8–2–0)	20–0	#11 Bridgeport (6–4–0)	#9 St. Marys (7–3–0)	20–13	#8 South Harrison (6–3–1)
1993	#2 East Bank* (9–1–0)	14–3	#15 Petersburg (7–3–0)	#4 Wayne (9–1–0)	12–7	#13 Frankfort (7–3–0)
1993	#5 Iaeger* (9–1–0)	14–7	#12 Pocahontas County (7–3–0)	#7 Richwood (8–2–0)	20–17	#10 Lincoln (6–4–0)
1993	#1 Magnolia (9–1–0)	34–6	#16 Oceana* (6–4–0)	#14 Musselman (6–4–0)	28–26	#3 Poca (8–2–0)
1993	Quarter-finals	Score		Quarter-finals	Score	
1993	East Bank*	28–14	Richwood	Wayne	12–7	Tyler Consolidated
1993	Musselman	15–12	Iaeger*	Magnolia	42–0	St. Marys
1993	Semi-final	Score		Semi-final	Score	
1993	East Bank*	14–6	Wayne	Magnolia	31–0	Musselman
1993	Champion	Score	Runner-up			
1993	#2 East Bank* (6) (13–1–0)	16–14	#1 Magnolia (12–2–0)			
Year	First round	Score		First round	Score	
1994	#1 Sissonville (9–1–0)	20–14	#16 Lincoln (6–4–0)	#9 Midland Trail (8–2–0)	14–12	#8 Tug Valley (8–2–0)
1994	#4 Ritchie County (9–1–0)	31–0	#13 Duval* (7–3–0)	#5 Bluefield (7–3–0)	28–7	#12 Tucker County (7–3–0)
1994	#15 Iaeger* (7–3–0)	26–16	#2 Independence (9–1–0)	#7 Frankfort (9–1–0)	29–0	#10 Ravenswood (7–3–0)
1994	#6 Bridgeport (8–2–0)	21–14	#11 East Bank* (6–4–0)	#3 Poca (8–2–0)	7–6	#14 Sherman (6–4–0)
1994	Quarter-finals	Score		Quarter-finals	Score	
1994	Sissonville	8–7	Midland Trail	Ritchie County	27–23	Bluefield
1994	Frankfort	21–7	Iaeger*	Poca	19–7	Bridgeport
1994	Semi-final	Score		Semi-final	Score	
1994	Sissonville	21–20	Ritchie County	Poca	28–0	Frankfort
1994	Champion	Score	Runner-up			
1994	#3 Poca (2) (12–2–0)	19–0	#1 Sissonville (12–2–0)			
Year	First round	Score		First round	Score	
1995	#16 Musselman (6–4–0)	19–8	#1 South Harrison (9–1–0)	#2 Poca (9–1–0)	20–0	#15 Grafton (7–3–0)
1995	#3 Bluefield (7–2–0)	32–8	#14 East Bank* (6–3–0)	#13 Tolsia (8–2–0)	10–0	#4 Frankfort (9–0–0)
1995	#12 Duval* (7–2–0)	28–7	#5 James Monroe (8–2–0)	#6 Bridgeport (8–2–0)	35–0	#11 Iaeger* (9–1–0)
1995	#10 Midland Trail (8–2–0)	28–27	#7 Ritchie County (10–0–0)	#9 Greenbrier West (8–2–0)	7–0	#8 Summers County (8–2–0)
1995	Quarter-finals	Score		Quarter-finals	Score	
1995	Duval*	34–12	Tolsia	Bluefield	14–7	Bridgeport
1995	Musselman	38–7	#9 Greenbrier West	Poca	28–9	Midland Trail
1995	Semi-final	Score		Semi-final	Score	
1995	Musselman	29–22	Duval*	Bluefield	28–7	Poca
1995	Champion	Score	Runner-up			
1995	#16 Musselman (3) (10–4–0)	19–0	#3 Bluefield (10–3–0)			
Year	First round	Score		First round	Score	
1996	#16 Tucker County (5–4–0)	38–13	#1 Grafton (10–0–0)	#8 Keyser (7–3–0)	42–6	#9 James Monroe (7–3–0)
1996	#13 Ravenswood (7–3–0)	14–8	#4 Frankfort (10–0–0)	#5 Poca (9–1–0)	34–7	Liberty-Harrison (6–3–0)
1996	#3 East Bank* (9–1–0)	65–3	#14 Pike View (7–3–0)	#6 Tolsia (9–1–0)	34–7	#11 Braxton County (8–2–0)
1996	#7 Iaeger* (8–2–0)	27–14	#10 Buffalo-Wayne* (7–3–0)	#2 Bluefield (9–1–0)	73–8	#15 Ritchie County
1996	Quarter-finals	Score		Quarter-finals	Score	
1996	Keyser	27–7	Tucker County	Poca	29–0	Ravenswood
1996	East Bank*	30–7	Tolsia	Bluefield	41–14	Iaeger*
1996	Semi-final	Score		Semi-final	Score	
1996	Poca	14–0	Keyser	East Bank*	22–14	Bluefield
1996	Champion	Score	Runner-up			
1996	#3 East Bank* (7) (13–1–0)	20–14	#5 Poca (13–1–0)			
Year	First round	Score		First round	Score	
1997	#1 Bluefield (10–0–0)	32–20	#16 Liberty-Harrison (6–4–0)	#8 Man (6–3–0)	33–14	#9 Clay County (8–2–0)
1997	#12 Keyser (7–3–0)	7–3	#5 Frankfort (9–1–0)	#4 Weir (8–2–0)	42–14	#13 Summers County (7–3–0)
1997	#3 Tolsia (10–0–0)	34–14	#14 Chapmanville (7–3–0)	#6 Magnolia (8–2–0)	13–10	#11 East Bank* (7–3–0)
1997	#7 Richwood (8–2–0)	26–2	#10 Greenbrier West (8–2–0)	#2 Grafton (10–0–0)	46–28	#15 Liberty-Raleigh (7–3–0)
1997	Quarter-finals	Score		Quarter-finals	Score	
1997	Bluefield	27–7	Man	Weir	43–18	Keyser
1997	Magnolia	7–6	Tolsia	Grafton	21–0	Richwood
1997	Semi-final	Score		Semi-final	Score	
1997	Bluefield	28–14	Weir	Grafton	25–20	Magnolia
1997	Champion	Score	Runner-up			
1997	#1 Bluefield (7) (14–0–0)	42–13	#2 Grafton (13–1–0)			
Year	First round	Score		First round	Score	
1998	#1 DuPont* (9–1–0)	49–14	#16 Liberty-Raleigh	#8 East Bank* (8–2–0)	40–14	#9 Mt. View (8–2–0)
1998	#5 Tucker County (9–1–0)	41–13	#12 Shady Spring (9–1–0)	#4 James Monroe (10–0–0)	42–18	#13 Richwood (8–2–0)
1998	#3 Magnolia (10–0–0)	55–0	#14 Ritchie County (8–2–0)	#11 Bridgeport (7–3–0)	28–19	#6 Ravenswood (9–1–0)
1998	#7 Tyler Consolidated (9–1–0)	28–21	#10 Scott (10–0–0)	#2 Weir (10–0–0)	49–13	South Harrison (6–4–0)
1998	Quarter-finals	Score		Quarter-finals	Score	
1998	DuPont*	21–20	East Bank*	James Monroe	39–13	Tucker County
1998	Magnolia	35–34 (ot)	Bridgeport	Weir	41–12	Tyler Consolidated
1998	Semi-final	Score		Semi-final	Score	
1998	DuPont*	21–14	James Monroe	Weir	20–7	Magnolia
1998	Champion	Score	Runner-up			
1998	#2 Weir (5) (14–0–0)	20–17	#1 DuPont* (12–2–0)			
Year	First round	Score		First round	Score	
1999	#1 Bluefield (9–1–0)	21–6	#16 Mt. View (6–4–0)	#8 Liberty-Harrison (7–3–0)	14–9	#9 Clay County (8–2–0)
1999	#5 Shady Spring (9–1–0)	20–9	#12 Webster County (8–2–0)	#4 Grafton (9–1–0)	21–7	#13 Poca (6–4–0)
1999	#11 Tyler Consolidated	21–9	#6 Bridgeport (7–3–0)	#3 James Monroe (9–0–0)	42–26	#14 Wayne (7–3–0)
1999	#2 Wyoming East (10–0–0)	40–13	#15 South Harrison (6–4–0)	#7 Sherman (8–2–0)	47–20	#10 Chapmanville (8–2–0)
1999	Quarter-finals	Score		Quarter-finals	Score	
1999	Bluefield	71–46	Liberty-Harrison	Grafton	14–13	Shady Spring
1999	James Monroe	45–17	Tyler Consolidated	Wyoming East	76–12	Sherman
1999	Semi-final	Score		Semi-final	Score	
1999	Bluefield	24–17	Grafton	Wyoming East	31–24	James Monroe
1999	Champion	Score	Runner-up			
1999	#2 Wyoming East (14–0–0)	57–21	#1 Bluefield (12–2–0)			
Year	First round	Score		First round	Score	
2000	#1 Bridgeport (10–0–0)	48–8	#16 Sherman (7–3–0)	#8 Tyler Consolidated (8–2–0)	32–6	#9 Williamstown (8–2–0)
2000	#4 Shady Spring (8–1–0)	34–7	#13 Magnolia (7–3–0)	#5 Oak Hill (8–2–0)	27–7	#12 Independence (7–3–0)
2000	#14 Winfield (7–3–0)	17–14(ot)	#3 Clay County (10–0–0)	#11 Iaeger* (8–2–0)	22–6	#6 Greenbrier West (9–1–0)
2000	#7 Wyoming East (8–2–0)	34–6	#10 Ritchie County (8–2–0)	#2 Wayne (10–0–0)	21–11	#15 Frankfort (6–4–0)
2000	Quarter-finals	Score		Quarter-finals	Score	
2000	Bridgeport	42–12	Tyler Consolidated	Shady Spring	25–13	Oak Hill
2000	Iaeger*	36–7	Winfield	Wayne	14–13(ot)	Wyoming East
2000	Semi-final	Score		Semi-final	Score	
2000	Bridgeport	42–7	Shady Spring	Wayne	33–8	Iaeger*
2000	Champion	Score	Runner-up			
2000	#1 Bridgeport (6) (14–0–0)	14–6	#2 Wayne (13–1–0)			
Year	First round	Score		First round	Score	

==== 2001-2010 ====
2001	#1 Bridgeport (10–0–0)	50–7	#16 Grafton (6–4–0)	#15 Mt. View (6–4–0)	14–12	#2 Wayne (9–0–0)
2001	#14 Clay County (7–3–0)	7–0	#3 Ravenswood (9–1–0)	#4 Williamstown (9–1–0)	28–6	#13 Iaeger* (8–2–0)
2001	#5 Oak Hill (8–2–0)	36–35	#12 James Monroe (7–3–0)	#6 Poca (7–3–0)	27–7	#11 Tolsia (7–3–0)
2001	#10 Magnolia (7–3–0)	17–13	#7 Frankfort (7–3–0)	#8 Wyoming East (7–3–0)	6–0	#9 Independence (8–2–0)
2001	Quarter-finals	Score		Quarter-finals	Score	
2001	Bridgeport	38–6	Wyoming East	Magnolia	15–11	Mt. View
2001	Poca	42–13	Clay County	Williamstown	34–20	Oak Hill
2001	Semi-final	Score		Semi-final	Score	
2001	Bridgeport	41–20	Williamstown	Poca	35–0	Magnolia
2001	Champion	Score	Runner-up			
2001	#6 Poca (3) (11–3–0)	21–7	#1 Bridgeport (13–1–0)			
Year	First round	Score		First round	Score	
2002	#1 James Monroe (10–0–0)	18–0	#16 Braxton County (6–4–0)	#9 Bluefield (6–4–0)	63–6	#8 Webster County (9–1–0)
2002	#5 Wayne (8–2–0)	20–12	#12 Mt. View (6–3–0)	#4 Frankfort (8–2–0)	48–0	#13 Berkeley Springs (7–3–0)
2002	#6 Poca (7–3–0)	24–13	#11 Oak Hill (7–3–0)	#14 Herbert Hoover (7–3–0)	13–6	#3 Bridgeport (9–1–0)
2002	#10 Ravenswood (7–3–0)	20–0	#7 Liberty-Raleigh (8–2–0)	#2 Keyser (9–1–0)	42–6	#15 Iaeger* (7–3–0)
2002	Quarter-finals	Score		Quarter-finals	Score	
2002	Bluefield	3–0	James Monroe	Wayne	22–6	Frankfort
2002	Poca	15–12	Herbert Hoover	Keyser	34–28	Ravenswood
2002	Semi-final	Score		Semi-final	Score	
2002	Bluefield	10–0	Wayne	Poca	21–13	Keyser
2002	Champion	Score	Runner-up			
2002	#7 Poca (4) (11–3–0)	27–7	#9 Bluefield (9–5–0)			
Year	First round	Score		First round	Score	
2003	#1 Bluefield (8–1–0)	61–16	#16 Oak Hill (6–4–0)	#8 Weir (8–2–0)	17–7	#9 Clay County (8–2–0)
2003	#5 Westside (9–1–0)	28–0	#12 Liberty-Raleigh (8–2–0)	#13 Wayne (7–3–0)	20–19	#4 Scott (9–1–0)
2003	#14 Bridgeport (7–3–0)	30–7	#3 Frankfort (8–2–0)	#11 Mt. View (8–2–0)	27–26	#6 Tyler Consolidated (8–2–0)
2003	#10 Ravenswood (8–2–0)	8–7	#7 Keyser (7–3–0)	#2 Poca (8–2–0)	46–20	#15 James Monroe (7–3–0)
2003	Quarter-finals	Score		Quarter-finals	Score	
2003	Bluefield	37–30(ot)	Weir	Westside	24–16	Wayne
2003	Mt. View	35–7	Bridgeport	Poca	14–7	Ravenswood
2003	Semi-final	Score		Semi-final	Score	
2003	Bluefield	35–8	Westside	Poca	24–2	Mt. View
2003	Champion	Score	Runner-up			
2003	#2 Poca (5) (12–2–0)	21–20(ot)	#1 Bluefield (11–2–0)			
Year	First round	Score		First round	Score	
2004	#1 Bluefield (10–0–0)	58–0	#16 Mt. View (6–3–0)	#8 Keyser (7–3–0)	53–16	#9 Sherman (8–2–0)
2004	#4 James Monroe (9–1–0)	12–10	#13 Liberty-Raleigh (7–3–0)	#5 Weir (8–2–0)	57–14	#12 Lincoln (7–3–0)
2004	#3 Ravenswood (9–1–0)	35–12	#14 Winfield (6–4–0)	#6 Shady Spring (8–2–0)	48–0	#11 Clay County (7–3–0)
2004	#7 Braxton County (9–1–0)	53–21	#10 Westside (8–2–0)	#2 Wayne (10–0–0)	41–10	#15 Scott (6–4–0)
2004	Quarter-finals	Score		Quarter-finals	Score	
2004	Bluefield	36–7	Keyser	Weir	63–23	James Monroe
2004	Shady Spring	14–7	Ravenswood	Wayne	47–21	Braxton County
2004	Semi-final	Score		Semi-final	Score	
2004	Bluefield	21–20(ot)	Weir	Wayne	33–6	Shady Spring
2004	Champion	Score	Runner-up			
2004	#1 Bluefield (8) (14–0–0)	69–24	#2 Wayne (13–1–0)			
Year	First round	Score		First round	Score	
2005	#1 Wayne (10–0–0)	83–42	#16 Liberty-Raleigh (6–4–0)	#2 James Monroe (10–0–0)	61–7	#15 Winfield (5–5–0)
2005	#14 Grafton (5–5–0)	29–27	#3 Herbert Hoover (9–1–0)	#4 Weir (9–1–0)	66–0	#13 Logan (5–5–0)
2005	#5 Scott (9–1–0)	21–6	#12 Berkeley Springs (5–5–0)	#11 Bluefield (5–4–0)	24–8	#6 Liberty-Harrison (9–1–0)
2005	#7 Tolsia (7–3–0)	27–8	#10 Independence (7–3–0)	#9 Magnolia (7–3–0)	49–14	#8 Mt. View (7–3–0)
2005	Quarter-finals	Score		Quarter-finals	Score	
2005	Wayne	49–13	Magnolia	Weir	34–8	Scott
2005	Bluefield	35–0	Grafton	James Monroe	34–27	Tolsia
2005	Semi-final	Score		Semi-final	Score	
2005	Weir	22–7	Wayne	Bluefield	24–14	James Monroe
2005	Champion	Score	Runner-up			
2005	#4 Weir (6) (13–1–0)	40–0	#11 Bluefield (8–5–0)			
Year	First round	Score		First round	Score	
2006	#1 James Monroe (10–0–0)	55–8	#16 Independence (7–3–0)	#8 Keyser (7–3–0)	41–6	#9 Magnolia (7–3–0)
2006	#4 Tolsia (8–2–0)	35–8	#13 Wyoming East (7–3–0)	#5 Bluefield (6–3–0)	46–6	#12 Liberty-Harrison (7–3–0)
2006	#2 Scott (9–1–0)	42–7	#15 Sissonville (6–4–0)	#7 Grafton (7–3–0)	33–14	#10 Mt. View (7–3–0)
2006	#3 Wayne (8–2–0)	34–8	#14 Roane County (7–3–0)	#6 Poca (7–3–0)	50–6	#11 Webster County (7–3–0)
2006	Quarter-finals	Score		Quarter-finals	Score	
2006	James Monroe	24–0	Keyser	Tolsia	15–14	Bluefield
2006	Grafton	23–0	Scott	Wayne	13–0	Poca
2006	Semi-final	Score		Semi-final	Score	
2006	Tolsia	7–6	James Monroe	Wayne	14–7	Grafton
2006	Champion	Score	Runner-up			
2006	#3 Wayne (12–2–0)	33–6	#4 Tolsia (11–3–0)			
Year	First round	Score		First round	Score	
2007	#1 Bluefield (9–0–0)	52–20	#16 Roane County (5–5–0)	#9 Chapmanville Regional (Note: formed from consolidation of Chapmanville and Harts in 2007) (7–3–0)	18–14	#9 Keyser (7–3–0)
2007	#5 Scott (7–3–0)	40–27	#12 Sissonville (6–4–0)	#4 Berkeley Springs (8–2–0)	55–40	#13 Logan (6–4–0)
2007	#3 James Monroe (9–1–0)	48–6	#14 Tolsia (6–4–0)	#6 Magnolia (8–2–0)	26–0	#11 Wyoming East (7–3–0)
2007	#7 Tyler Consolidated (8–2–0)	42–14	#10 Liberty-Raleigh (7–3–0)	#2 Wayne (10–0–0)	34–20	#15 Grafton (6–4–0)
2007	Quarter-finals	Score		Quarter-finals	Score	
2007	Bluefield	41–18	Chapmanville Regional	Scott	54–20	Berkeley Springs
2007	James Monroe	13–7	Magnolia	Wayne	35–15	Tyler Consolidated
2007	Semi-final	Score		Semi-final	Score	
2007	Bluefield	41–6	Scott	James Monroe	21–14	Wayne
2007	Champion	Score	Runner-up			
2007	#1 Bluefield (9) (13–0–0)	20–12	#3 James Monroe (12–2–0)			
Year	First round	Score		First round	Score	
2008	#1 Keyser (9–0–0)	47–0	#16 Wyoming East (6–4–0)	#8 Magnolia (7–3–0)	21–20	#9 Point Pleasant (7–3–0)
2008	#4 Weir (8–2–0)	23–14	#13 Independence (7–3–0)	#12 James Monroe (7–3–0)	33–0	#5 Chapmanville Regional (8–2–0)
2008	#2 Grafton (9–1–0)	41–16	#15 Philip Barbour (6–4–0)	#3 Wayne (9–1–0)	22–0	#14 Shady Spring (6–4–0)
2008	#7 Ravenswood (8–2–0)	46–22	#10 Webster County (8–2–0)	#11 Bluefield (6–4–0)	39–14	#6 Scott (7–3–0)
2008	Quarter-finals	Score		Quarter-finals	Score	
2008	Magnolia	23–19	Keyser	James Monroe	14–7	Weir
2008	Grafton	41–7	Ravenswood	Wayne	41–35	Bluefield
2008	Semi-final	Score		Semi-final	Score	
2008	Magnolia	13–7	James Monroe	Grafton	42–12	Wayne
2008	Champion	Score	Runner-up			
2008	#2 Grafton (4) (13–1–0)	56–25	#8 Magnolia (9–4–0)			
Year	First round	Score		First round	Score	
2009	#1 Wayne (10–0–0)	34–12	#16 Oak Glen (6–4–0)	#8 Ravenswood (8–2–0)	24–14	#9 James Monroe (8–2–0)
2009	#4 Frankfort (9–1–0)	42–16	#13 Herbert Hoover (6–4–0)	#12 Pike View (7–3–0)	34–21	#5 Westside (9–1–0)
2009	#2 Magnolia (10–0–0)	57–8	#15 Roane County (6–4–0)	#7 Keyser (7–3–0)	29–6	#10 Point Pleasant (7–3–0)
2009	#3 Sherman (10–0–0)	48–21	#14 Chapmanville Regional (6–4–0)	#6 Bluefield (8–2–0)	62–24	#11 Liberty-Raleigh (7–3–0)
2009	Quarter-finals	Score		Quarter-finals	Score	
2009	Wayne	27–0	Ravenswood	Frankfort	35–14	Pike View
2009	Magnolia	9–0	Keyser	Bluefield	25–18	Sherman
2009	Semi-final	Score		Semi-final	Score	
2009	Wayne	27–21	Frankfort	Bluefield	13–10	Magnolia
2009	Champion	Score	Runner-up			
2009	#6 Bluefield (10) (12–2–0)	27–7	#1 Wayne (13–1–0)			
Year	First round	Score		First round	Score	
2010	#1 Ravenswood (10–0–0)	63–14	#16 Poca (6–4–0)	#9 Roane County (8–2–0)	33–28	#8 Point Pleasant (7–3–0)
2010	#4 Bluefield (9–1–0)	42–0	#13 Liberty-Harrison (7–3–0)	#5 Wayne (8–2–0)	34–8	#12 Shady Spring (7–3–0)
2010	#2 Magnolia (10–0–0)	62–0	#15 Tug Valley (8–2–0)	#10 Chapmanville Regional (7–3–0)	30–14	#7 Pike View (8–2–0)
2010	#3 Greenbrier West (10–0–0)	42–10	#14 Herbert Hoover (6–4–0)	#11 Frankfort (7–3–0)	32–22	#6 River View (8–1–1)
2010	Quarter-finals	Score		Quarter-finals	Score	
2010	Ravenswood	48–20	Roane County	Bluefield	54–8	Wayne
2010	Magnolia	56–14	Chapmanville Regional	Greenbrier West	21–15	Frankfort
2010	Semi-final	Score		Semi-final	Score	
2010	Ravenswood	24–19	Bluefield	Magnolia	41–7	Greenbrier West
2010	Champion	Score	Runner-up			
2010	#2 Magnolia (3) (14–0–0)	28–13	#1 Ravenswood (13–1–0)			
Year	First round	Score		First round	Score	

==== 2011-2020 ====
Year	First round	Score		First round	Score	
2011	#1 Point Pleasant (10–0–0)	41–0	#16 Ritchie County (6–4–0)	#9 Oak Glen (9–1–0)	28–20	#8 Roane County (8–2–0)
2011	#12 Braxton County (7–3–0)	42–14	#5 Greenbrier West (9–1–0)	#13 Chapmanville Regional (7–3–0)	26–7	#4 Lincoln (9–1–0)
2011	#2 Shady Spring (10–0–0)	34–22	#15 Scott (6–4–0)	#10 River View (8–2–0)	28–23	#7 Ravenswood (8–2–0)
2011	#6 Wayne (8–2–0)	56–14	#11 Grafton (7–3–0)	#14 Keyser (6–4–0)	48–6	#3 Westside (9–1–0)
2011	Quarter-finals	Score		Quarter-finals	Score	
2011	Point Pleasant	66–40	Oak Glen	Chapmanville Regional	20–14	Braxton County
2011	Shady Spring	33–26	River View	Wayne	38–8	Keyser
2011	Semi-final	Score		Semi-final	Score	
2011	Point Pleasant	33–13	Chapmanville Regional	Wayne	52–9	Shady Spring
2011	Champion	Score	Runner-up			
2011	#6 Wayne (2) (12–2–0)	34–7	#1 Point Pleasant (13–1–0)			
Year	First round	Score		First round	Score	
2012	#1 Wayne (10–0–0)	63–24	#16 Clay County	#9 Nicholas County (6–3–0)	31–7	#8 Ritchie County (7–3–0)
2012	#4 Robert C. Byrd (9–1–0)	27–21	#13 Braxton County (6–4–0)	#5 Bluefield (8–2–0)	63–27	#12 Roane County (6–4–0)
2012	#2 Keyser (9–1–0)	61–14	#15 Mingo Central (5–5–0)	#7 Scott (7–3–0)	46–16	#10 Wyoming East (7–3–0)
2012	#3 Bridgeport (7–2–0)	54–6	#14 River View (6–4–0)	#6 Frankfort (8–2–0)	38–7	#11 Summers County (7–3–0)
2012	Quarter-finals	Score		Quarter-finals	Score	
2012	Wayne	47–0	Nicholas County	Robert C. Byrd	34–20	Bluefield
2012	Keyser	53–8	Scott	Bridgeport	28–0	Frankfort
2012	Semi-final	Score		Semi-final	Score	
2012	Wayne	18–0	Robert C. Byrd	Keyser	42–14	Bridgeport
2012	Champion	Score	Runner-up			
2012	#1 Wayne (3) (14–0–0)	35–0	#2 Keyser (12–2–0)			
Year	First round	Score		First round	Score	
2013	#1 Wayne (10–0–0)	53–25	#16 Philip Barbour (6–4–0)	#8 Sissonville (9–1–0)	28–18	#9 Mingo Central (8–2–0)
2013	#12 Ritchie County (7–3–0)	24–14	#5 Summers County	#13 Robert C. Byrd (7–3–0)	21–17	#4 Frankfort (8–2–0)
2013	#3 Bluefield (8–2–0)	31–14	#14 Ravenswood (6–4–0)	#11 Nicholas County (8–2–0)	35–14	#6 Wyoming East (9–1–0)
2013	#7 Fairmont Senior (8–2–0)	49–28	#10 Keyser (7–3–0)	#2 Bridgeport (9–1–0)	54–20	#15 Roane County (7–3–0)
2013	Quarter-finals	Score		Quarter-finals	Score	
2013	Wayne	48–7	Sissonville	Robert C. Byrd	36–6	Ritchie County
2013	Bluefield	26–14	Nicholas County	Bridgeport	28–0	Fairmont Senior
2013	Semi-final	Score		Semi-final	Score	
2013	Wayne	44–20	Robert C. Byrd	Bridgeport	42–21	Bluefield
2013	Champion	Score	Runner-up			
2013	#2 Bridgeport (7) (13–1–0)	14–13	#1 Wayne (13–1–0)			
Year	First round	Score		First round	Score	
2014	#1 Bridgeport (9–1–0)	50–14	#16 Liberty-Raleigh (8–2–0)	#8 Robert C. Byrd (8–2–0)	38–14	#9 Keyser (7–3–0)
2014	#5 Wayne (8–2–0)	43–40	#12 Fairmont Senior (7–3–0)	#4 Mingo Central (9–1–0)	35–13	#13 Sissonville (7–3–0)
2014	#14 Ravenswood (7–3–0)	42–41	#3 Bluefield (9–1–0)	#6 Westside (8–2–0)	56–52	#11 Weir (8–2–0)
2014	#7 Nicholas County (9–1–0)	28–22	#10 Scott (7–3–0)	#2 Frankfort (10–0–0)	39–0	#15 Wyoming East (7–3–0)
2014	Quarter-finals	Score		Quarter-finals	Score	
2014	Bridgeport	35–14	Robert C. Byrd	Wayne	35–17	Mingo Central
2014	Westside	42–25	Ravenswood	Frankfort	26–20	Nicholas County
2014	Semi-final	Score		Semi-final	Score	
2014	Bridgeport	48–7	Wayne	Frankfort	49–16	Westside
2014	Champion	Score	Runner-up			
2014	#1 Bridgeport (8) (13–1–0)	43–7	#2 Frankfort (13–1–0)			
Year	First round	Score		First round	Score	
2015	#1 Bridgeport (9–0–1)	41–7	#16 Independence (7–3–0)	#2 Bluefield (8–1–0)	32–13	#15 Weir (7–3–0)
2015	#3 Tolsia (9–1–0)	28–6	#14 Liberty-Raleigh (7–3–0)	#4 Fairmont Senior (8–2–0)	28–14	#13 Lincoln (7–3–0)
2015	#5 Keyser (8–2–0)	45–14	#12 Westside (7–3–0)	#11 Herbert Hoover (7–3–0)	55–40	#6 James Monroe (8–2–0)
2015	#7 Mingo Central (8–2–0)	68–28	#10 Summers County (8–2–0)	#9 Robert C. Byrd (7–3–0)	42–14	#8 Chapmanville Regional (7–3–0)
2015	Quarter-finals	Score		Quarter-finals	Score	
2015	Bridgeport	41–13	Robert C. Byrd	Mingo Central	35–22	Bluefield
2015	Tolsia	54–0	Herbert Hoover	Fairmont Senior	58–42	Keyser
2015	Semi-final	Score		Semi-final	Score	
2015	Bridgeport	28–20	Fairmont Senior	Tolsia	22–0	Mingo Central
2015	Champion	Score	Runner-up			
2015	#1 Bridgeport (9) (13–0–1)	39–0	#3 Tolsia (13–1–0)			
Year	First round	Score		First round	Score	
2016	#1 Bridgeport (10–0–0)	28–7	#16 Roane County (6–4–0)	#8 Lincoln (8–2–0)	35–12	#9 Independence (8–2–0)
2016	#5 Fairmont Senior (7–2–0)	48–27	#12 Herbert Hoover (7–3–0)	#13 Weir (7–3–0)	29–27	#4 Sissonville (9–1–0)
2016	#3 Point Pleasant (10–0–0)	45–42	#14 North Marion (6–4–0)	#6 James Monroe (9–1–0)	38–28	#11 Winfield (7–3–0)
2016	#10 Keyser (7–3–0)	50–12	#7 Nicholas County (9–1–0)	#2 Mingo Central (10–0–0)	55–7	#15 Liberty-Harrison (6–4–0)
2016	Quarter-finals	Score		Quarter-finals	Score	
2016	Bridgeport	45–14	Lincoln	Fairmont Senior	30–15	Weir
2016	James Monroe	21–0	Point Pleasant	Mingo Central	41–21	Keyser
2016	Semi-final	Score		Semi-final	Score	
2016	Fairmont Senior	22–21(2ot)	Bridgeport	Mingo Central	32–7	James Monroe
2016	Champion	Score	Runner-up			
2016	#2 Mingo Central (14–0–0)	32–7	#5 Fairmont Senior (10–3–0)			
Year	First round	Score		First round	Score	
2017	#1 Mingo Central (10–0–0)	76–40	#16 Robert C. Byrd (6–4–0)	#8 Liberty-Harrison (8–2–0)	27–7	#9 Nicholas County (8–2–0)
2017	#11 Winfield (7–3–0)	29–0	#6 James Monroe (8–2–0)	#3 Bridgeport (9–1–0)	35–12	#14 Weir (7–3–0)
2017	#4 Fairmont Senior (9–1–0)	34–12	#13 Keyser (7–3–0)	#5 Wayne (9–1–0)	54–28	#12 Sissonville (7–3–0)
2017	#7 Point Pleasant (8–2–0)	63–14	#10 Philip Barbour (8–2–0)	#2 Bluefield (10–0–0)	46–14	#15 Braxton County (7–3–0)
2017	Quarter-finals	Score		Quarter-finals	Score	
2017	Mingo Central	53–22	Liberty-Harrison	Bridgeport	42–13	Winfield
2017	Fairmont Senior	43–8	Wayne	Bluefield	49–17	Point Pleasant
2017	Semi-final	Score		Semi-final	Score	
2017	Fairmont Senior	35–6	Mingo Central	Bluefield	37–14	Bridgeport
2017	Champion	Score	Runner-up			
2017	#2 Bluefield (11) (14–0–0)	29–26	#4 Fairmont Senior (12–2–0)			
Year	First round	Score		First round	Score	
2018	#1 Fairmont Senior (10–0–0)	56–6	#16 Lewis County (6–4–0)	#8 Point Pleasant (8–1–0)	65–36	#9 Mingo Central (8–2–0)
2018	#12 Weir (8–2–0)	41–14	#5 Poca (9–1–0)	#4 Nicholas County (10–0–0)	41–10	#13 Petersburg (7–2–0)
2018	#3 Bridgeport (9–1–0)	49–13	#14 Frankfort (8–2–0)	#6 Robert C. Byrd (8–2–0)	35–15	#11 Shady Spring (8–2–0)
2018	#7 Keyser (8–2–0)	28–8	#10 Wayne (8–2–0)	#2 Bluefield (9–1–0)	56–7	#15 Oak Hill (7–3–0)
2018	Quarter-finals	Score		Quarter-finals	Score	
2018	Fairmont Senior	66–13	Point Pleasant	Weir	63–43	Nicholas County
2018	Bridgeport	42–7	Robert C. Byrd	Bluefield	35–0	Keyser
2018	Semi-final	Score		Semi-final	Score	
2018	Fairmont Senior	59–0	Weir	Bluefield	35–14	Bridgeport
2018	Champion	Score	Runner-up			
2018	#1 Fairmont Senior(6) (14–0–0)	23–13	#2 Bluefield (12–2–0)			
Year	First round	Score		First round	Score	
2019	#1 Fairmont Senior (10–0–0)	63–34	#16 Winfield (7–3–0)	#8 Frankfort (8–2–0)	58–12	#9 Nicholas County (8–2–0)
2019	#5 Keyser (9–1–0)	53–0	#12 Liberty-Harrison (8–2–0)	#4 Bluefield (9–1–0)	48–16	#13 Man (8–2–0)
2019	#3 Poca (10–0–0)	42–17	#14 North Marion (7–3–0)	#6 Oak Glen (10–0–0)	55–13	#11 Wyoming East (8–2–0)
2019	#10 Mingo Central (8–2–0)	13–7	#7 Shady Spring (9–1–0)	#2 Bridgeport (9–1–0)	56–15	#15 Lewis County (7–3–0)
2019	Quarter-finals	Score		Quarter-finals	Score	
2019	Fairmont Senior	31–7	Frankfort	Bluefield	43–20	Keyser
2019	Oak Glen	25–20	Poca	Bridgeport	28–8	Mingo Central
2019	Semi-finals	Score		Semi-finals	Score	
2019	Bluefield	40–24	Fairmont Senior	Bridgeport	38–7	Oak Glen
2019	Champion	Score	Runner-up			
2019	#2 Bridgeport(10) (13–1–0)	21–14	#4 Bluefield (12–2–0)			

In 2020 the COVID-19 epidemic effected the football season greatly. Health officials developed a map, which was published each Saturday, and used to determine which counties could participate in WVSSAC activities the upcoming week.

==== 2020 ====
First Round
1	Sissonville	27
16	Elkins	42
8	Robert C Byrd	1
9	Poca	0
4	Liberty-Raleigh	33
13	Herbert Hoover	34
5	Oak Glen	42
12	Point Pleasant	0
2	Bluefield	47
15	Clay County	6
7	Keyser	0
10	North Marion	1
3	Frankfort	0
14	Independence	1
6	Fairmont Senior	60
11	Braxton County	34

Quarter-finals
16	Elkins	6
8	Robert C Byrd	33
13	Herbert Hoover	26
5	Oak Glen	53
2	Bluefield	33
10	North Marion	10
14	Independence	15
6	Fairmont Senior	43

Semi-finals
8	Robert C Byrd	F
5	Oak Glen	F
2	Bluefield	19
6	Fairmont Senior	21

State Championship
BYE
6	Fairmont Senior (7)

=== 2021-2023 ===
==== 2021 ====
First Round

November 12-13, 2021

Quarter-finals

November 19-20, 2021

Semi-finals

November 26-27, 2021

State Championship

December 3, 2021

Wheeling Island Stadium, Wheeling

1
Herbert Hoover (10-0-0)
28

16
Fairmont Senior (6-4-0)
30

16
Fairmont Senior
33

8
Robert C Byrd
28

8
Robert C Byrd (7-3-0)
45

9
Scott (7-3-0)
28

16
Fairmont Senior
41

5
Poca
7

4
Lincoln (8-2-0)
17

13
Frankfort (6-4-0)
21

13
Frankfort
49

5
Poca
56

5
Poca (8-2-0)
28

12
Liberty-Raleigh (7-3-0)
6

16
Fairmont Senior (8)
21

2
Independence
12

2
Independence (9-0-0)
73

15
Shady Spring (7-3-0)
7

2
Independence
22

10
Roane County
8

7
Nicholas County (8-2-0)
15

10
Roane County (8-2-0)
18

2
Independence
34

14
Bluefield
20

3
Point Pleasant (9-1-0)
20

14
Bluefield (6-3-0)
44

14
Bluefield
35

6
North Marion
21

6
North Marion (8-2-0)
64

11
Grafton (8-2-0)
14

==== 2022 ====
First Round

November 11, 2022

Quarter-finals

November 18, 2022

Semi-finals

November 25, 2022

State Championship

December 2, 2022

Wheeling Island Stadium, Wheeling

1
Winfield (9-1-0)
43

16
Logan (6-4-0)
0

1
Winfield
26

9
Herbert Hoover
27

8
Clay County (8-1-0)
26

9
Herbert Hoover (7-2-0)
63

9
Herbert Hoover
17

5
Frankfort
10

4
Scott (9-1-0)
35

13
East Fairmont (7-3-0)
31

4
Scott
6

5
Frankfort
41

5
Frankfort (9-1-0)
14

12
Nicholas County (7-3-0)
0

9
Herbert Hoover
7

2
Independence
42

2
Independence (9-0-0)
20

15
Bluefield (5-5-0)
12

2
Independence
42

7
Fairmont Senior
7

7
Fairmont Senior (7-3-0)
42

10
Chapmanville (7-3-0)
20

2
Independence
58

6
North Marion
19

3
Roane County (10-0-0)
40

14
Weir (7-3-0)
20

3
Roane County
12

6
North Marion
13

6
North Marion (8-2-0)
37

11
Lincoln (7-3-0)
7

==== 2023 ====
First Round

November 10, 2023

Quarterfinals

November 17, 2023

Semifinals

November 24, 2023

State Championship

December 1, 2023

Wheeling Island Stadium, Wheeling

1
North Marion
35

16
Lincoln
14

1
North Marion
35

9
Herbert Hoover
17

8
East Fairmont
14

9
Herbert Hoover
28

1
North Marion
48

5
Weir
14

4
Scott
27

13
Nitro
0

4
Scott
33

5
Weir
35

5
Weir
23

12
Frankfort
21

1
North Marion
48

2
Fairmont Senior (9)
49

2
Fairmont Senior
31

15
Wayne
27

2
Fairmont Senior
42

10
Philip Barbour
0

7
Mingo Central
21

10
Philip Barbour
28

2
Fairmont Senior
42

14
Independence
21

3
Roane County
21

14
Independence
54

14
Independence
13

6
Winfield
0

6
Winfield
57

11
Lewis County
21

== Class AAA ==
=== Two-Team Playoff (1958–1971) ===
(*school no longer exists)

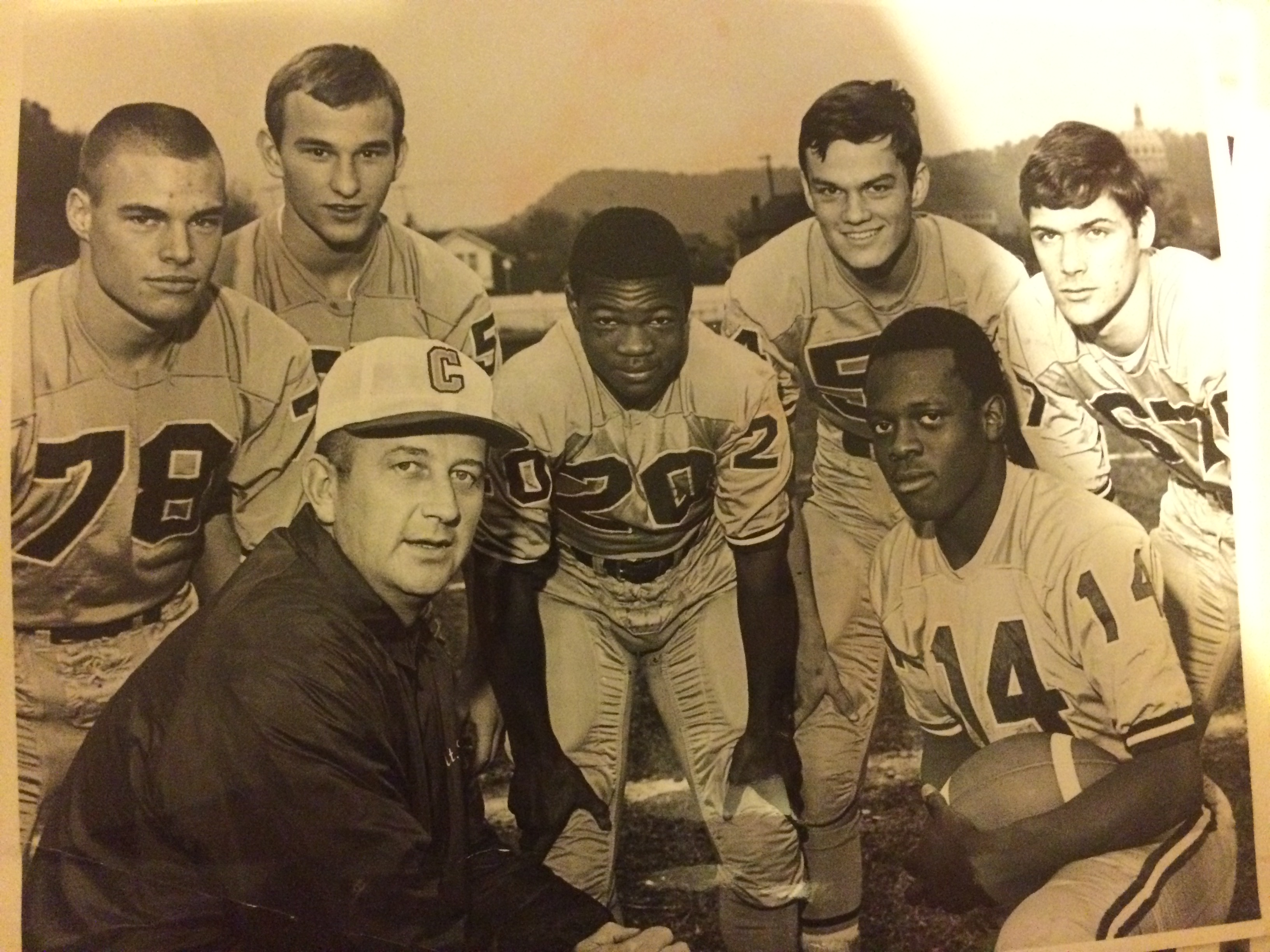
Charleston High School, WV, Head Coach Frank Vincent was the first to win three consecutive AAA football titles. The Lions won in 1968, 1969 and 1970.

Year	Champion	Score	Runner-up
1958	Parkersburg (11) (11–0–0)	35–12	East Bank* (10–1–0)
1959	Bluefield (11–0–0)	19–13	Parkersburg (9–1–1)
1960	Weir (10–1–0)	40–0	Nitro (10–1–0)
1961	Weir (2) (10–1)	27–6	St. Albans (9–2–0)
1962	Bluefield (2) (11–0–0)	40–12	Parkersburg (9–1–1)
1963	Buckhannon-Upshur (4) (10–0–0) (Note: no game: Charleston* and Welch* tied for second place playoff slot so B-U received BYE)		no game played
1964	East Bank* (10–0–1)	6–0	(Old) Huntington* (9–2–0)
1965	Bluefield (3) (11–0–0)	13–0	Dunbar* (9–2–0) (Note: merged into South Charleston High School 1990.)
1966	Buckhannon-Upshur (5) (11–0–0)	21–2	(Old) Huntington* (10–1–0)
1967	Bluefield (4) (11–0–0)	27–7	Stonewall Jackson* (9–2–0)
1968	Charleston* (6) (10–0–1)	3–0	St. Albans (9–2–0)
1969	Charleston* (7) (11–0–0)	6–0	Buckhannon-Upshur (10–1–0)
1970	Charleston* (8) (9–0–1)	32–7	Clarksburg-Victory* (9–1–1)
1971	East Bank* (2) (10–1–0)	22–16	Morgantown (9–2–0)

=== Four-Team Playoff (1972–1977) ===
(*school no longer exists)

Year	Semi-final	Score		Semi-final	Score	
1972	#1 Bridgeport (10–0–0)	18–15	#4 St. Albans (9–1–0)	#2 Dupont* (10–0–0)	34–32(2ot)	#3 Bluefield (10–0–0)
1972	Champion	Score	Runner-up			
1972	#1 Bridgeport (2) (12–0–0)	16–14	#2 DuPont* (11–1–0)			
Year	Semi-final	Score		Semi-final	Score	
1973	#1 East Bank* (10–0–0)	21–6	#4 Parkersburg (9–1–0)	#3 Weir (9–1–0)	26–20	#2 Fairmont Senior (10–0–0)
1973	Champion	Score	Runner-up			
1973	#1 East Bank* (3) (12–0–0)	10–0	#3 Weir (10–2–0)			
Year	Semi-final	Score		Semi-final	Score	
1974	#4 Parkersburg (9–1–0)	32–0	#1 Buckhannon-Upshur (10–0–0)	#2 Stonewall Jackson* (10–0–0)	22–3	#3 Ravenswood (10–0–0)
1974	Champion	Score	Runner-up			
1974	#2 Stonewall Jackson* (12–0–0)	16–0	#4 Parkersburg (10–2–0)			
Year	Semi-final	Score		Semi-final	Score	
1975	#4 Bluefield (9–1–0)	42–0	#1 Buckhannon-Upshur (10–0–0)	#2 South Charleston (9–1–0)	48–8	#3 Parkersburg South (9–1–0)
1975	Champion	Score	Runner-up			
1975	#4 Bluefield (5) (11–1–0)	20–7	#2 South Charleston (10–2–0)			
Year	Semi-final	Score		Semi-final	Score	
1976	#4 Parkersburg (8–2–0)	38–6	#1 Martinsburg (10–0–0)	#2 DuPont* (10–0–0)	33–12	#3 East Fairmont (8–2–0)
1976	Champion	Score	Runner-up			
1976	#4 Parkersburg (12) (10–2–0)	30–0	#2 DuPont* (11–1–0)			
Year	Semi-final	Score		Semi-final	Score	
1977	#1 Fairmont Senior (10–0–0)	20–14	#4 Herbert Hoover	#2 Woodrow Wilson (10–0–0)	7–3	#3 Parkersburg (9–1–0)
1977	Champion	Score	Runner-up			
1977	#2 Woodrow Wilson (4) (12–0–0)	6–0	#1 Fairmont Senior (11–1–0)			

=== Eight-Team Playoff (1978–1990) ===
(*school no longer exists)

Year	Quarter-finals	Score		Quarter-finals	Score	
1978	#8 Parkersburg (8–2–0)	21–0	#1 Fairmont Senior (9–0–0)	#2 DuPont* (9–1–0)	36–12	#7 Huntington East* (8–2–0)
1978	#4 Bridgeport (9–1–0)	14–6	#5 George Washington (8–2–0)	#6 Stonewall Jackson* (8–2–0)	12–7	#3 Brooke (9–1–0)
1978	Semi-final	Score		Semi-final	Score	
1978	Parkersburg	22–0	Bridgeport	DuPont*	25–6	Stonewall Jackson*
1978	Champion	Score	Runner-up			
1978	#8 Parkersburg (13) (11–2–0)	6–0	#2 DuPont* (11–2–0)			
Year	Quarter-finals	Score		Quarter-finals	Score	
1979	#1 St. Albans (10–0–0)	18–13	#8 Martinsburg (7–2–1)	#2 Bridgeport (10–0–0)	35–8	#7 Lincoln (9–1–0)
1979	#6 Parkersburg (8–2–0)	28–0	#3 Brooke (9–1–0)	#4 Point Pleasant (10–0–0)	27–8	#5 George Washington (9–1–0)
1979	Semi-final	Score		Semi-final	Score	
1979	Bridgeport	7–6	Parkersburg	St. Albans	21–0	Point Pleasant
1979	Champion	Score	Runner-up			
1979	#2 Bridgeport (3) (13–0–0)	20–7	#1 St. Albans (12–1–0)			
Year	Quarter-finals	Score		Quarter-finals	Score	
1980	#1 North Marion (10–0–0)	21–7	#8 Barboursville* (9–1–0)	#2 Huntington East* (10–0–0)	29–13	#7 Charleston* (8–2–0)
1980	#6 Parkersburg (9–1–0)	14–12	#3 George Washington (9–1–0)	#5 Brooke (8–1–1)	28–0	#4 Elkins (9–1–0)
1980	Semi-final	Score		Semi-final	Score	
1980	Brooke	42–0	Huntington East*	North Marion	21–3	Parkersburg
1980	Champion	Score	Runner-up			
1980	#1 North Marion (13–0–0)	10–3	#6 Brooke (10–2–1)			
Year	Quarter-finals	Score		Quarter-finals	Score	
1981	#1 Charleston* (9–1–0)	28–0	#8 Bridgeport (9–1–0)	#2 Fairmont Senior (9–1–0)	17–0	#7 Barboursville* (9–1–0)
1981	#6 Brooke (9–1–0)	30–0	#3 Martinsburg (9–1–0)	#5 North Marion (9–1–0)	20–6	#4 Parkersburg (9–1–0)
1981	Semi-final	Score		Semi-final	Score	
1981	Fairmont Senior	13–3	Brooke	North Marion	27–0	Charleston*
1981	Champion	Score	Runner-up			
1981	#5 North Marion (2) (12–1–0)	21–6	#2 Fairmont Senior (11–2–0)			
Year	Quarter-finals	Score		Quarter-finals	Score	
1982	#1 George Washington (10–0–0)	14–7	#8 Princeton (9–1–0)	#2 North Marion (9–0–0)	45–7	#7 Hurricane (9–1–0)
1982	#6 Brooke (9–1–0)	28–0	#3 Martinsburg (9–1–0)	#4 Parkersburg (9–1–0)	12–7	#5 Buckhannon-Upshur (8–1–0)
1982	Semi-final	Score		Semi-final	Score	
1982	George Washington	13–6	Parkersburg	North Marion	3–0	Brooke
1982	Champion	Score	Runner-up			
1982	#1 George Washington (13–0–0)	13–9	#2 North Marion (11–1–0)			
Year	Quarter-finals	Score		Quarter-finals	Score	
1983	#1 Morgantown (8–1–0)	24–8	#8 Fairmont Senior (7–2–0)	#7 Charleston* (8–2–0)	10–0	#2 Parkersburg (9–1–0)
1983	#6 Barboursville* (9–1–0)	24–15	#3 East Bank* (9–1–0)	#4 Weir (9–1–0)	19–13	#5 Woodrow Wilson (8–1–0)
1983	Semi-final	Score		Semi-final	Score	
1983	Morgantown	19–0	Weir	Barboursville*	14–3	Charleston*
1983	Champion	Score	Runner-up			
1983	#1 Morgantown (11–1–0)	42–20	#6 Barboursville* (11–2–0)			
Year	Quarter-finals	Score		Quarter-finals	Score	
1984	#1 Barboursville* (10–0–0)	28–7	#8 Fairmont Senior (8–2–0)	#2 Brooke	21–19	#7 Hurricane (8–2–0)
1984	#3 Bluefield (8–2–0)	21–15	#6 Woodrow Wilson (7–2–0)	#4 Stonewall Jackson*	14–7	#5 Greenbrier East (8–2–0)
1984	Semi-final	Score		Semi-final	Score	
1984	Barboursville*	36–27	Stonewall Jackson*	Bluefield	17–0	Brooke
1984	Champion	Score	Runner-up			
1984	#3 Bluefield (6) (11–2–0)	13–7	#1 Barboursville* (12–1–0)			
Year	Quarter-finals	Score		Quarter-finals	Score	
1985	#8 Brooke (8–2–0)	43–7	#1 Stonewall Jackson*	#2 George Washington (9–1–0)	21–20	#7 Point Pleasant (8–2–0)
1985	#3 Parkersburg (9–1–0)	10–7	#6 John Marshall (9–1–0)	#5 North Marion (9–1–0)	12–7	#4 Charleston* (9–1–0)
1985	Semi-final	Score		Semi-final	Score	
1985	Brooke	30–0	North Marion	Parkersburg	28–13	George Washington
1985	Champion	Score	Runner-up			
1985	#8 Brooke (11–2–0)	6–0	#3 Parkersburg (11–2–0)			
Year	Quarter-finals	Score		Quarter-finals	Score	
1986	#8 St. Albans (8–2–0)	10–0	#1 DuPont* (9–0–1)	#7 Ripley (8–2–0)	9–8	#2 Martinsburg (9–1–0)
1986	#3 Brooke (9–1–0)	29–6	#6 Princeton (9–1–0)	#5 Stonewall Jackson* (8–1–1)	24–21	#4 Fairmont Senior (9–1–0)
1986	Semi-final	Score		Semi-final	Score	
1986	Stonewall Jackson*	14–7	St. Albans	Brooke	28–10	Ripley
1986	Champion	Score	Runner-up			
1986	#5 Stonewall Jackson* (2) (11–1–1)	17–14	#3 Brooke (11–2–0)			
Year	Quarter-finals	Score		Quarter-finals	Score	
1987	#1 Stonewall Jackson* (10–0–0)	42–14	#8 Wheeling Park (8–2–0)	#2 Brooke (10–0–0)	42–14	#7 Ripley (8–2–0)
1987	#6 Charleston* (8–2–0)	17–14	#3 DuPont* (9–1–0)	#4 Huntington East* (9–1–0)	23–6	#5 Jefferson County (8–2–0)
1987	Semi-final	Score		Semi-final	Score	
1987	Brooke	14–7	Charleston*	Stonewall Jackson*	14–12	Huntington East*
1987	Champion	Score	Runner-up			
1987	#2 Brooke (2) (13–0–0)	12–0	#1 Stonewall Jackson* (12–1–0)			
Year	Quarter-finals	Score		Quarter-finals	Score	
1988	#1 Charleston* (10–0–0)	24–0	#8 DuPont* (8–2–0)	#2 Greenbrier East (10–0–0)	15–0	#7 George Washington (8–2–0)
1988	#6 (Old) Huntington* (8–2–0)	24–8	#3 Weir (9–1–0)	#5 North Marion (7–2–0)	9–6	#4 Buckhannon-Upshur (9–1–0)
1988	Semi-final	Score		Semi-final	Score	
1988	Charleston*	42–0	North Marion	Greenbrier East	53–21	(Old) Huntington*
1988	Champion	Score	Runner-up			
1988	#1 Charleston* (9) (13–0–0)	17–0	#2 Greenbrier East (12–1–0)			
Year	Quarter-finals	Score		Quarter-finals	Score	
1989	#1 Capital (9–0–0)	12–9	#8 Buckhannon-Upshur (7–3–0)	#7 Brooke (7–3–0)	27–14	#2 Ripley (10–0–0)
1989	#3 Wheeling Park (8–2–0)	30–21	#6 Herbert Hoover (8–2–0)	#5 Mt. View (7–2–0)	12–0	#4 Martinsburg (8–2–0)
1989	Semi-final	Score		Semi-final	Score	
1989	Capital	27–12	Mt. View	Brooke	40–16	Wheeling Park
1989	Champion	Score	Runner-up			
1989	#1 Capital (12–0–0)	20–13	#7 Brooke (9–4–0)			
Year	Quarter-finals	Score		Quarter-finals	Score	
1990	#1 Brooke (10–0–0)	10–0	#8 South Charleston (7–3–0)	#7 Mt. View (8–1–0)	21–6	#2 Capital (9–1–0)
1990	#6 Martinsburg (8–2–0)	14–13	#3 Logan (8–1–0)	#5 Wheeling Park (8–2–0)	33–16	#4 Greenbrier East (9–1–0)
1990	Semi-final	Score		Semi-final	Score	
1990	Brooke	24–0	Wheeling Park	Mt. View	13–0	Martinsburg
1990	Champion	Score	Runner-up			
1990	#1 Brooke (3) (13–0–0)	14–7	#7 Mount View (10–2–0)			

=== Sixteen-Team Playoff (1991–2023) ===
==== 1991-2000 ====
(*school no longer exists)

Year	First round	Score		First round	Score	
1991	#1 Capital (9–0–0)	3–0	#16 Jefferson (6–4–0)	#8 Hedgesville (8–2–0)	18–14	#9 Bluefield (7–3–0)
1991	#4 Barboursville* (9–1–0)	28–12	#13 St. Albans (7–3–0)	#5 Brooke (8–2–0)	42–8	#12 Philip Barbour (7–3–0)
1991	#2 Wheeling Park (9–1–0)	21–13	#15 Greenbrier East (6–3–0)	#10 John Marshall (7–3–0)	19–14	#7 Parkersburg South (8–2–0)
1991	#5 Mt. View (9–0–0)	20–0	#14 DuPont* (6–4–0)	#11 South Charleston (7–3–0)	14–7	#6 Fairmont Senior (8–2–0)
1991	Quarter-finals	Score		Quarter-finals	Score	
1991	Capital	24–18(ot)	Hedgesville	Barboursville*	20–14	Brooke
1991	Wheeling Park	37–21	John Marshall	Mt. View	27–21	South Charleston
1991	Semi-final	Score		Semi-final	Score	
1991	Capital	29–6	Barboursville*	Wheeling Park	22–12	Mt. View
1991	Champion	Score	Runner-up			
1991	#1 Capital (2) (13–0–0)	15–14 (ot)	#2 Wheeling Park (12–2–0)			
Year	First round	Score		First round	Score	
1992	#16 North Marion (6–4–0)	17–10	#1 John Marshall (9–1–0)	#2 Barboursville* (9–1–0)	34–29	#15 Greenbrier East (6–3–0)
1992	#3 Capital (8–2–0)	21–3	#14 Jefferson (6–4–0)	#4 Fairmont Senior (8–2–0)	36–15	#13 Hedgesville (7–3–0)
1992	#5 Huntington East* (8–2–0)	26–17	#12 Herbert Hoover (7–3–0)	#6 Bluefield (7–2–0)	17–0	#11 Man (7–3–0)
1992	#7 DuPont* (7–3–0)	35–0	#10 South Charleston (7–3–0)	#9 Brooke (7–3–0)	25–7	#8 Elkins (8–2–0)
1992	Quarter-finals	Score		Quarter-finals	Score	
1992	Brooke	20–3	North Marion	DuPont*	20–8	Barboursville*
1992	Capital	21–7	Bluefield	Fairmont Senior	20–12	Huntington East*
1992	Semi-final	Score		Semi-final	Score	
1992	Brooke	13–12(ot)	Fairmont Senior	DuPont*	33–17	Capital
1992	Champion	Score	Runner-up			
1992	#7 DuPont* (11–3–0)	36–7	#9 Brooke (10–4–0)			
Year	First round	Score		First round	Score	
1993	#8 Hurricane (8–2–0)	12–7	#9 Martinsburg (8–2–0)	#1 Barboursville* (9–1–0)	15–7	#16 John Marshall (6–4–0)
1993	#11 Capital (8–2–0)	28–6	#6 Princeton (9–1–0)	#3 DuPont* (9–1–0)	20–0	#14 Man (7–3–0)
1993	#15 Herbert Hoover (7–3–0)	33–13	#2 Fairmont Senior (9–1–0)	#4 Hedgesville (9–1–0)	33–0	#13 Clarksburg Washington Irving* (7–2–1)
1993	#10 Oak Glen (8–2–0)	34–15	#7 North Marion (8–2–0)	#5 South Charleston (9–1–0)	28–0	#12 Nicholas County (8–2–0)
1993	Quarter-finals	Score		Quarter-finals	Score	
1993	Barboursville*	10–7	Hedgesville	Capital	13–7	South Charleston
1993	DuPont*	21–6	Hurricane	Herbert Hoover	36–20	Oak Glen
1993	Semi-final	Score		Semi-final	Score	
1993	DuPont*	34–14	Barboursville*	Capital	35–21	Herbert Hoover
1993	Champion	Score	Runner-up			
1993	#3 DuPont* (2) (13–1–0)	29–3	#6 Capital (11–3–0)			
Year	First round	Score		First round	Score	
1994	#1 DuPont* (10–0–0)	39–16	#16 Princeton (7–3–0)	#8 St. Albans (7–3–0)	20–19	#9 Parkersburg (7–3–0)
1994	#4 Woodrow Wilson (9–1–0)	41–13	#13 Pike View (8–2–0)	#5 South Charleston (8–2–0)	19–13	#12 Hedgesville (7–3–0)
1994	#15 Weir (7–3–0)	21–14(ot)	#2 Brooke (9–0–0)	#7 University (8–2–0)	14–0	#10 Cabell Midland (6–3–0)
1994	#6 Herbert Hoover (8–2–0)	22–0	#11 Hurricane (7–3–0)	#3 North Marion (9–1–0)	43–14	#14 Greenbrier East (6–3–0)
1994	Quarter-finals	Score		Quarter-finals	Score	
1994	DuPont*	47–15	St. Albans	South Charleston	57–0	Woodrow Wilson
1994	University	20–14	Weir	Herbert Hoover	25–14	North Marion
1994	Semi-final	Score		Semi-final	Score	
1994	South Charleston	10–7	DuPont*	University	15–6	Herbert Hoover
1994	Champion	Score	Runner-up			
1994	#5 South Charleston (2) (12–2–0)	29–7	#7 University (11–3–0)			
Year	First round	Score		First round	Score	
1995	#1 Parkersburg (9–1–0)	47–0	#16 North Marion (6–4–0)	#2 Capital (9–1–0)	41–0	#15 St. Albans (6–4–0)
1995	#3 Princeton (9–1–0)	18–0	#14 Morgantown (6–4–0)	#13 Hedgesville (7–3–0)	61–8	#4 Fairmont Senior (9–1–0)
1995	#5 Herbert Hoover (8–2–0)	30–13	#12 Buckhannon-Upshur (7–3–0)	#6 Brooke (8–2–0)	35–3	#11 Preston (7–3–0)
1995	#9 Wheeling Park (7–3–0)	19–6	#8 Ripley (8–2–0)	#10 Cabell Midland (6–3–0)	34–7	#7 John Marshall (8–2–0)
1995	Quarter-finals	Score		Quarter-finals	Score	
1995	Hedgesville	35–14	Herbert Hoover	Brooke	28–12	Princeton
1995	Parkersburg	28–7	Wheeling Park	Capital	7–6	Cabell Midland
1995	Semi-final	Score		Semi-final	Score	
1995	Hedgesville	18–0	Parkersburg	Capital	28–7	Brooke
1995	Champion	Score	Runner-up			
1995	#2 Capital (3) (13–1–0)	20–0	#5 Hedgesville (10–4–0)			
Year	First round	Score		First round	Score	
1996	#1 John Marshall (9–1–0)	36–0	#16 University (6–4–0)	#8 Wheeling Park (7–3–0)	20–10	#9 Parkersburg (7–3–0)
1996	#4 North Marion (8–2–0)	40–14	#13 Ripley (7–3–0)	#5 St. Albans (8–2–0)	14–7(ot)	#12 Point Pleasant (7–3–0)
1996	#14 Morgantown (6–4–0)	24–21	#3 Musselman (9–1–0)	#11 Greenbrier East (7–3–0)	19–7	#6 Bridgeport (9–1–0)
1996	#7 Herbert Hoover (8–2–0)	21–14	#10 Woodrow Wilson (7–3–0)	#2 Capital (9–1–0)	56–20	#15 Nitro (7–3–0)
1996	Quarter-finals	Score		Quarter-finals	Score	
1996	John Marshall	24–10	Wheeling Park	North Marion	40–7	St. Albans
1996	Morgantown	31–12	Greenbrier East	Capital	50–20	Herbert Hoover
1996	Semi-final	Score		Semi-final	Score	
1996	John Marshall	27–18	North Marion	Capital	56–7	Morgantown
1996	Champion	Score	Runner-up			
1996	#1 John Marshall (13–1–0)	29–22	#2 Capital (12–2–0)			
Year	First round	Score		First round	Score	
1997	#16 Ripley (6–4–0)	24–21	#1 Morgantown (10–0–0)	#8 Hedgesville (8–2–0)	23–17	#9 Bridgeport (8–2–0)
1997	#5 Parkersburg (8–2–0)	29–0	#12 Greenbrier East (7–3–0)	#4 Capital (8–2–0)	26–12	#13 Point Pleasant (7–3–0)
1997	#3 Nitro (8–1–0)	41–14	#14 Oak Hill (7–3–0)	#6 DuPont* (8–2–0)	35–13	#11 Brooke (6–4–0)
1997	#10 (New) Huntington (7–3–0)	19–6	#7 Cabell Midland (8–2–0)	#2 North Marion (9–1–0)	28–7	#15 Wheeling Park (6–4–0)
1997	Quarter-finals	Score		Quarter-finals	Score	
1997	Hedgesville	27–15	Ripley	Parkersburg	19–10	Capital
1997	DuPont*	49–40	Nitro	North Marion	34–8	(New) Huntington
1997	Semi-final	Score		Semi-final	Score	
1997	Parkersburg	42–13	Hedgesville	North Marion	24–19	DuPont*
1997	Champion	Score	Runner-up			
1997	#2 North Marion (3) (13–1–0)	24–19	#5 Parkersburg (11–3–0)			
Year	First round	Score		First round	Score	
1998	#1 Musselman (10–0–0)	35–6	#16 Spring Valley (6–4–0)	#9 Capital (7–3–0)	28–0	#8 Robert C. Byrd (8–2–0)
1998	#5 Morgantown (9–1–0)	43–13	#12 Point Pleasant (7–3–0)	#4 University (8–2–0)	27–21	#13 North Marion (6–4–0)
1998	#3 Nitro (10–0–0)	56–3	#14 Wheeling Park (6–4–0)	#6 (New) Huntington (8–2–0)	19–13	#11 Martinsburg (7–3–0)
1998	#10 Buckhannon-Upshur (7–3–0)	13–7	#7 Greenbrier East (8–2–0)	#2 Parkersburg (10–0–0)	58–7	#15 Hurricane (6–4–0)
1998	Quarter-finals	Score		Quarter-finals	Score	
1998	Capital	20–14(ot)	Musselman	Morgantown	18–0	University
1998	Nitro	27–14	(New) Huntington	Parkersburg	31–15	Buckhannon-Upshur
1998	Semi-final	Score		Semi-final	Score	
1998	Morgantown	7–0	Capital	Nitro	24–15	Parkersburg
1998	Champion	Score	Runner-up			
1998	#3 Nitro (14–0–0)	69–52	#5 Morgantown (12–2–0)			
Year	First round	Score		First round	Score	
1999	#1 Parkersburg (10–0–0)	57–6	#16 Hurricane (6–4–0)	#9 (New) Huntington (7–3–0)	21–0	#8 Spring Valley (8–2–0)
1999	#5 Musselman (9–1–0)	32–28	#12 George Washington (7–3–0)	#4 Morgantown (9–1–0)	21–18	#13 Princeton (7–3–0)
1999	#6 Robert C. Byrd (9–1–0)	20–10	#11 Keyser (8–2–0)	#3 Capital (9–1–0)	49–14	#14 John Marshall (7–3–0)
1999	#10 Riverside (7–3–0)	59–22	#7 Martinsburg (9–1–0)	#2 University (10–0–0)	34–20	#15 Woodrow Wilson (7–3–0)
1999	Quarter-finals	Score		Quarter-finals	Score	
1999	Parkersburg	21–18	(New) Huntington	Musselman	29–13	Morgantown
1999	Capital	13–0	Robert C. Byrd	Riverside	35–7	University
1999	Semi-final	Score		Semi-final	Score	
1999	Parkersburg	54–14	Musselman	Riverside	41–7	Capital
1999	Champion	Score	Runner-up			
1999	#1 Parkersburg (14) (14–0–0)	31–28	#10 Riverside (10–4–0)			
Year	First round	Score		First round	Score	
2000	#1 Morgantown (10–0–0)	48–7	#16 Fairmont Senior (6–4–0)	#8 Robert C. Byrd (9–1–0)	14–0	#9 Keyser (9–1–0)
2000	#4 Cabell Midland (8–2–0)	20–15	#13 George Washington (7–3–0)	#12 Princeton (8–2–0)	32–28	#5 Wheeling Park (9–1–0)
2000	#3 Parkersburg (9–1–0)	69–0	#14 Hampshire (8–2–0)	#6 Riverside (8–2–0)	30–7	#11 Martinsburg (8–2–0)
2000	#10 University (8–2–0)	40–14	#7 Hurricane (8–2–0)	#2 Woodrow Wilson (9–0–0)	28–0	#15 Philip Barbour (7–3–0)
2000	Quarter-finals	Score		Quarter-finals	Score	
2000	Morgantown	18–9	Robert C. Byrd	Cabell Midland	27–8	Princeton
2000	Parkersburg	14–0	Riverside	University	38–7	Woodrow Wilson
2000	Semi-final	Score		Semi-final	Score	
2000	Morgantown	33–18	Cabell Midland	Parkersburg	27–21(ot)	University
2000	Champion	Score	Runner-up			
2000	#1 Morgantown (2) (14–0–0)	38–13	#3 Parkersburg (12–2–0)			

==== 2001-2010 ====
Year	First round	Score		First round	Score	
2001	#1 Morgantown (9–1–0)	28–0	#16 Lewis County (7–3–0)	#2 Riverside (9–1–0)	55–3	#15 Herbert Hoover (6–4–0)
2001	#3 University (9–1–0)	14–9	#14 Musselman (6–4–0)	#4 Martinsburg (9–1–0)	47–6	#13 Philip Barbour (7–3–0)
2001	#5 Parkersburg South (9–1–0)	27–14	#12 Cabell Midland (6–4–0)	#6 Parkersburg (8–2–0)	56–12	#11 Hampshire (8–2–0)
2001	#7 Woodrow Wilson (8–2–0)	40–7	#10 Spring Valley (7–3–0)	#8 North Marion (8–2–0)	26–6	#9 George Washington (7–3–0)
2001	Quarter-finals	Score		Quarter-finals	Score	
2001	Morgantown	38–20	North Marion	Riverside	25–21	Woodrow Wilson
2001	Parkersburg	28–14	University	Martinsburg	43–21	Parkersburg South
2001	Semi-final	Score		Semi-final	Score	
2001	Martinsburg	19–8	Morgantown	Parkersburg	31–24	Riverside
2001	Champion	Score	Runner-up			
2001	#6 Parkersburg (15) (12–2–0)	28–17	#4 Martinsburg (12–2–0)			
Year	First round	Score		First round	Score	
2002	#1 Morgantown (10–0–0)	52–0	#16 Woodrow Wilson (5–5–0)	#8 University (8–2–0)	20–14(ot)	#9 Cabell Midland (8–2–0)
2002	#5 Ripley (9–1–0)	26–14	#12 Buckhannon-Upshur (7–3–0)	#4 Riverside (9–1–0)	41–15	#13 Robert C. Byrd (7–3–0)
2002	#6 Parkersburg South (9–1–0)	32–6	#11 Wheeling Park (7–3–0)	#3 Princeton (9–1–0)	14–7	#14 North Marion (6–4–0)
2002	#7 George Washington (8–2–0)	63–19	#10 Hurricane (8–2–0)	#2 Martinsburg (10–0–0)	48–13	#15 Spring Valley (5–5–0)
2002	Quarter-finals	Score		Quarter-finals	Score	
2002	Morgantown	12–7	University	Riverside	47–14	Ripley
2002	Parkersburg South	9–8	Princeton	Martinsburg	36–14	George Washington
2002	Semi-final	Score		Semi-final	Score	
2002	Morgantown	19–14	Riverside	Parkersburg South	24–21	Martinsburg
2002	Champion	Score	Runner-up			
2002	#1 Morgantown (3) (14–0–0)	37–14	#6 Parkersburg South (12–2–0)			
Year	First round	Score		First round	Score	
2003	#1 Martinsburg (10–0–0)	53–12	#16 Robert C. Byrd (7–3–0)	#9 (New) Huntington (7–3–0)	55–28	#8 Nitro (8–2–0)
2003	#5 Cabell Midland (8–2–0)	28–12	#12 Hampshire (7–3–0)	#13 Parkersburg (6–4–0)	20–18	#4 Riverside (8–2–0)
2003	#3 Parkersburg South (9–1–0)	35–0	#14 Capital (6–4–0)	#6 Wheeling Park (8–2–0)	30–6	#11 George Washington (7–3–0)
2003	#10 University (7–3–0)	54–13	#7 Elkins (8–2–0)	#2 Morgantown (9–1–0)	34–21	#15 Spring Valley (6–4–0)
2003	Quarter-finals	Score		Quarter-finals	Score	
2003	Martinsburg	21–7	(New) Huntington	Cabell Midland	13–9	Parkersburg
2003	Parkersburg South	24–3	Wheeling Park	Morgantown	42–21	University
2003	Semi-final	Score		Semi-final	Score	
2003	Martinsburg	28–14	Cabell Midland	Parkersburg South	14–13	Morgantown
2003	Champion	Score	Runner-up			
2003	#3 Parkersburg South (13–1–0)	26–20	#1 Martinsburg (13–1–0)			
Year	First round	Score		First round	Score	
2004	#1 Morgantown (10–0–0)	49–7	#16 Cabell Midland (5–5–0)	#8 Nitro (8–2–0)	34–31	#9 Robert C. Byrd (9–1–0)
2004	#4 Capital (8–2–0)	13–10(ot)	#13 George Washington (6–4–0)	#12 Riverside (6–4–0)	21–14	#5 Parkersburg South (9–1–0)
2004	#3 Parkersburg (8–2–0)	42–13	#14 Wheeling Park (6–4–0)	#11 Bridgeport (8–2–0)	20–12	#6 (New) Huntington (8–2–0)
2004	#10 Jefferson (7–3–0)	20–10	#7 Buckhannon-Upshur (9–1–0)	#2 Martinsburg (9–1–0)	33–13	#15 University (5–5–0)
2004	Quarter-finals	Score		Quarter-finals	Score	
2004	Morgantown	45–14	Nitro	Riverside	24–20	Capital
2004	Parkersburg	36–7	Bridgeport	Martinsburg	35–34	Jefferson
2004	Semi-final	Score		Semi-final	Score	
2004	Morgantown	38–14	Riverside	Martinsburg	31–28	Parkersburg
2004	Champion	Score	Runner-up			
2004	#1 Morgantown (4) (14–0–0)	38–12	#2 Martinsburg (12–2–0)			
Year	First round	Score		First round	Score	
2005	#1 Morgantown (10–0–0)	38–13	#16 St. Albans (6–4–0)	#2 Jefferson (10–0–0)	39–7	#15 Fairmont Senior (6–4–0)
2005	#3 Nitro (9–1–0)	37–0	#14 Capital (6–4–0)	#13 Cabell Midland (6–4–0)	38–35	#4 Woodrow Wilson (9–1–0)
2005	#12 Hurricane (7–3–0)	26–21	#5 Martinsburg (9–1–0)	#11 Parkersburg (7–3–0)	35–7	#6 Buckhannon-Upshur (9–1–0)
2005	#10 University (7–3–0)	28–24	#7 Bridgeport (9–1–0)	#8 South Charleston (8–2–0)	33–0	#9 John Marshall (8–2–0)
2005	Quarter-finals	Score		Quarter-finals	Score	
2005	Morgantown	14–7	South Charleston	Cabell Midland	24–21	Hurricane
2005	Nitro	38–13	Parkersburg	University	27–19	Jefferson
2005	Semi-final	Score		Semi-final	Score	
2005	Morgantown	28–12	Cabell Midland	Nitro	50–23	University
2005	Champion	Score	Runner-up			
2005	#1 Morgantown (5) (14–0–0)	27–24 (ot)	#3 Nitro (12–2–0)			
Year	First round	Score		First round	Score	
2006	#1 Parkersburg (10–0–0)	17–13	#16 Cabell Midland (6–4–0)	#9 St. Albans (7–3–0)	20–0	#8 Bridgeport (8–2–0)
2006	#4 Morgantown (8–2–0)	35–14	#13 (New) Huntington (6–4–0)	#5 Robert C. Byrd (9–1–0)	15–8	#12 East Fairmont (7–3–0)
2006	#2 Martinsburg (9–1–0)	49–7	#15 Brooke (7–3–0)	#10 South Charleston (7–3–0)	35–22	#7 Hurricane (8–2–0)
2006	#3 Nitro (9–1–0)	30–26	#14 Princeton (6–4–0)	#6 Fairmont Senior (8–2–0)	40–21	#11 Wheeling Park (7–3–0)
2006	Quarter-finals	Score		Quarter-finals	Score	
2006	Parkersburg	21–0	St. Albans	Morgantown	33–14	Robert C. Byrd
2006	Martinsburg	13–2	South Charleston	Fairmont Senior	35–28	Nitro
2006	Semi-final	Score		Semi-final	Score	
2006	Parkersburg	42–14	Morgantown	Martinsburg	40–0	Fairmont Senior
2006	Champion	Score	Runner-up			
2006	#1 Parkersburg (16) (14–0–0)	34–6	#2 Martinsburg (12–2–0)			
Year	First round	Score		First round	Score	
2007	#1 George Washington (9–1–0)	45–8	#16 Nicholas County (7–3–0)	#8 East Fairmont (8–2–0)	20–16	#9 Hurricane (8–2–0)
2007	#5 St. Albans (9–1–0)	37–20	#12 Brooke (7–3–0)	#13 Nitro (6–4–0)	52–31	#4 Robert C. Byrd (10–0–0)
2007	#3 Parkersburg (9–1–0)	35–0	#14 John Marshall (7–3–0)	#6 Bridgeport (9–1–0)	27–26	#11 Martinsburg (7–3–0)
2007	#7 Capital (8–2–0)	28–21(ot)	#10 Riverside (7–3–0)	#2 University (9–1–0)	20–14	#15 Morgantown (6–4–0)
2007	Quarter-finals	Score		Quarter-finals	Score	
2007	East Fairmont	14–3	George Washington	St. Albans	52–49	Nitro
2007	Parkersburg	45–13	Bridgeport	University	24–13	Capital
2007	Semi-final	Score		Semi-final	Score	
2007	St. Albans	14–12	East Fairmont	Parkersburg	31–21	University
2007	Champion	Score	Runner-up			
2007	#3 Parkersburg (17) (13–1–0)	22–15	#5 St. Albans (12–2–0)			
Year	First round	Score		First round	Score	
2008	#1 South Charleston (10–0–0)	62–21	#16 Musselman (6–4–0)	#9 Martinsburg (8–2–0)	7–0	#8 Cabell Midland (8–2–0)
2008	#4 Morgantown (9–1–0)	47–13	#13 Nicholas County (8–2–0)	#5 Capital (9–1–0)	35–14	#12 Hurricane (7–3–0)
2008	#2 George Washington (9–1–0)	46–13	#15 Preston (6–4–0)	#7 Bridgeport (9–1–0)	42–35	#10 Parkersburg South (8–2–0)
2008	#3 Wheeling Park (9–1–0)	49–0	#14 Fairmont Senior (6–4–0)	#6 University (9–1–0)	35–14	#11 Spring Valley (7–3–0)
2008	Quarter-finals	Score		Quarter-finals	Score	
2008	South Charleston	28–21	Martinsburg	Morgantown	21–0	Capital
2008	George Washington	29–14	Bridgeport	University	21–13	Wheeling Park
2008	Semi-final	Score		Semi-final	Score	
2008	South Charleston	34–18	Morgantown	George Washington	19–17	University
2008	Champion	Score	Runner-up			
2008	#1 South Charleston (3) (14–0–0)	39–8	#2 George Washington (12–2–0)			
Year	First round	Score		First round	Score	
2009	#1 Brooke (10–0–0)	33–17	#16 Princeton (6–4–0)	#9 Ripley (8–2–0)	21–14	#8 Nicholas County (9–1–0)
2009	#13 University (7–3–0)	23–0	#4 Spring Valley (9–1–0)	#5 Fairmont Senior (9–1–0)	35–21	#12 Parkersburg South (7–3–0)
2009	#2 South Charleston (9–1–0)	45–18	#15 Lewis County (7–3–0)	#7 Martinsburg (8–2–0)	19–13	#10 Morgantown (7–3–0)
2009	#3 Bridgeport (10–0–0)	24–17	#14 Parkersburg (6–4–0)	#6 George Washington (8–2–0)	49–21	#11 Capital (6–4–0)
2009	Quarter-finals	Score		Quarter-finals	Score	
2009	Brooke	34–14	Ripley	University	31–28	Fairmont Senior
2009	South Charleston	38–28	Martinsburg	Bridgeport	31–0	George Washington
2009	Semi-final	Score		Semi-final	Score	
2009	Brooke	32–15	University	South Charleston	28–25	Bridgeport
2009	Champion	Score	Runner-up			
2009	#2 South Charleston (4) (13–1–0)	28–7	#1 Brooke (13–1–0)			
Year	First round	Score		First round	Score	
2010	#1 George Washington (10–0–0)	42–8	#16 Logan (6–4–0)	#8 Brooke (8–2–0)	49–13	#9 Nicholas County (9–1–0)
2010	#4 South Charleston (9–1–0)	62–7	#13 Parkersburg (6–4–0)	#5 Hurricane (9–1–0)	39–17	#12 Spring Valley (7–3–0)
2010	#2 Martinsburg (10–0–0)	54–0	#15 Lewis County (7–3–0)	#7 Bridgeport (9–1–0)	23–14	#10 University (8–2–0)
2010	#3 Morgantown (9–1–0)	45–29	#14 Robert C. Byrd (6–4–0)	#6 Capital (8–2–0)	35–16	#11 Fairmont Senior (7–3–0)
2010	Quarter-finals	Score		Quarter-finals	Score	
2010	Brooke	28–21	George Washington	South Charleston	30–26	Hurricane
2010	Martinsburg	31–7	Bridgeport	Morgantown	28–21	Capital
2010	Semi-final	Score		Semi-final	Score	
2010	South Charleston (forfeited, see below)	29–28	Brooke	Martinsburg	24–10	Morgantown
2010	Champion	Score	Runner-up			
2010	#2 Martinsburg (14–0–0)	30–0	#8 Brooke (11–3–0)			

With 14 seconds remaining in the Hurricane vs. South Charleston quarter-final game, an on-field fight occurred. This resulted in five South Charleston and four Hurricane players being ejected. Ejection from a game results in a WVSSAC mandatory suspension from the next contest. However, four of the South Charleston players' parents filed a lawsuit and a Kanawha County judge ruled the players could play in the semi-final game against Brooke. After losing 29–28 to South Charleston, Brooke parents filed their own lawsuit in Brooke County, stating that South Charleston had used the ejected players illegally. The AAA state title game was postponed one week while the case went to the Supreme Court of Appeals of West Virginia. The Supreme Court of Appeals of West Virginia ruled the Kanawha County judge had overstepped her bounds and that the WVSSAC had final say in the matter. South Charleston was forced to forfeit its game against Brooke. Brooke then advanced to the AAA title game against Martinsburg.

==== 2011-2020 ====
Year	First round	Score		First round	Score	
2011	#1 Martinsburg (10–0–0)	49–13	#16 Woodrow Wilson (5–5–0)	#8 (New) Huntington (7–3–0)	56–20	#9 Parkersburg (7–3–0)
2011	#5 Morgantown (8–2–0)	48–14	#12 Musselman (7–3–0)	#13 Parkersburg South (6–4–0)	51–8	#4 Logan (8–2–0)
2011	#2 Bridgeport (10–0–0)	28–21	#15 Robert C. Byrd (6–4–0)	#7 Cabell Midland (7–3–0)	27–24(ot)	#10 Wheeling Park (7–3–0)
2011	#11 Hurricane (7–3–0)	54–30	#6 Elkins (8–2–0)	#3 George Washington (10–0–0)	42–7	#14 Spring Valley (6–4–0)
2011	Quarter-finals	Score		Quarter-finals	Score	
2011	Martinsburg	46–7	(New) Huntington	Morgantown	45–22	Parkersburg South
2011	Bridgeport	41–8	Cabell Midland	George Washington	33–6	Hurricane
2011	Semi-final	Score		Semi-final	Score	
2011	Martinsburg	38–14	Morgantown	George Washington	21–14	Bridgeport
2011	Champion	Score	Runner-up			
2011	#1 Martinsburg (2) (14–0–0)	35–27	#3 George Washington (13–1–0)			
Year	First round	Score		First round	Score	
2012	#1 Cabell Midland (10–0–0)	52–20	#16 Oak Hill (7–3–0)	#8 Spring Valley (7–3–0)	31–7	#9 Wheeling Park (7–3–0)
2012	#4 (New) Huntington (8–2–0)	69–32	#13 Elkins (7–3–0)	#5 Morgantown (8–2–0)	49–28	#12 Point Pleasant (8–2–0)
2012	#2 Martinsburg (9–1–0)	39–0	#15 Woodrow Wilson (6–4–0)	#10 Musselman (7–3–0)	42–23	#7 Capital (7–3–0)
2012	#3 George Washington (8–2–0)	35–10	#14 Hurricane (6–4–0)	#11 Lewis County (8–2–0)	24–23	#6 University (8–2–0)
2012	Quarter-finals	Score		Quarter-finals	Score	
2012	Cabell Midland	28–26	Spring Valley	Morgantown	35–14	(New) Huntington
2012	Martinsburg	50–7	Musselman	George Washington	41–14	Lewis County
2012	Semi-final	Score		Semi-final	Score	
2012	Cabell Midland	35–28	Morgantown	Martinsburg	63–14	George Washington
2012	Champion	Score	Runner-up			
2012	#2 Martinsburg (3) (13–1–0)	38–14	#1 Cabell Midland (13–1–0)			
Year	First round	Score		First round	Score	
2013	#1 (New) Huntington (10–0–0)	31–7	#16 Lewis County (7–3–0)	#8 George Washington (8–2–0)	21–14(ot)	#9 Oak Hill (8–2–0)
2013	#5 Wheeling Park (9–1–0)	55–34	#12 South Charleston (7–3–0)	#4 Point Pleasant (10–0–0)	41–14	#13 Logan (7–3–0)
2013	#3 Capital (9–1–0)	38–10	#14 Hurricane (6–4–0)	#6 University (9–1–0)	9–3	#11 Morgantown (8–2–0)
2013	#7 Cabell Midland (8–2–0)	38–10	#10 Washington (8–2–0)	#2 Martinsburg (9–1–0)	36–0	#15 Spring Valley (6–4–0)
2013	Quarter-finals	Score		Quarter-finals	Score	
2013	(New) Huntington	17–13	George Washington	Wheeling Park	28–7	Point Pleasant
2013	Capital	65–14	University	Martinsburg	54–28	Cabell Midland
2013	Semi-final	Score		Semi-final	Score	
2013	(New) Huntington	34–21	Wheeling Park	Martinsburg	35–21	Capital
2013	Champion	Score	Runner-up			
2013	#2 Martinsburg (4) (13–1–0)	9–7	#1 (New) Huntington (13–1–0) (Note: Formed from consolidation of Huntington East and "Old" Huntington High)			
Year	First round	Score		First round	Score	
2014	#1 Capital (9–0–0)	70–0	#16 Parkersburg South (6–4–0)	#8 Wheeling Park (8–2–0)	35–3	#9 Lewis County (8–2–0)
2014	#5 Point Pleasant (9–0–0)	38–20	#12 Jefferson (7–3–0)	#4 Martinsburg (9–1–0)	52–3	#13 Buckhannon-Upshur (7–3–0)
2014	#3 University (9–1–0)	28–6	#14 Woodrow Wilson (6–3–0)	#6 South Charleston (8–2–0)	55–36	#11 Spring Valley (7–3–0)
2014	#7 (New) Huntington (7–3–0)	27–7	#10 Hurricane (7–3–0)	#2 Cabell Midland (9–1–0)	45–42	#15 Parkersburg (6–4–0)
2014	Quarter-finals	Score		Quarter-finals	Score	
2014	Capital	35–14	Wheeling Park	Martinsburg	49–28	Point Pleasant
2014	South Charleston	24–20	University	(New) Huntington	28–21	Cabell Midland
2014	Semi-final	Score		Semi-final	Score	
2014	Capital	35–7	Martinsburg	South Charleston	35–21	(New) Huntington
2014	Champion	Score	Runner-up			
2014	#1 Capital (4) (13–0–0)	55–15	#6 South Charleston (11–3–0)			
Year	First round	Score		First round	Score	
2015	#1 Cabell Midland (10–0–0)	55–7	#16 Princeton (5–5–0)	#2 Point Pleasant (10–0–0)	54–14	#15 Musselman (6–4–0)
2015	#3 Wheeling Park (8–1–1)	37–14	#14 Spring Valley (6–4–0)	#4 Capital (7–2–0)	62–7	#13 Spring Mills (7–3–0)
2015	#5 Martinsburg (7–2–0)	47–28	#12 Greenbrier East (7–3–0)	#11 South Charleston (7–3–0)	28–8	#6 Jefferson (8–2–0)
2015	#7 (New) Huntington (8–2–0)	25–7	#10 George Washington (7–3–0)	#9 Brooke (7–3–0)	27–14	#8 Morgantown (8–2–0)
2015	Quarter-finals	Score		Quarter-finals	Score	
2015	Cabell Midland	30–7	Brooke	Point Pleasant	49–0	(New) Huntington
2015	Wheeling Park	41–0	South Charleston	Capital	35–30	Martinsburg
2015	Semi-final	Score		Semi-final	Score	
2015	Capital	35–13	Cabell Midland	Wheeling Park	35–14	Point Pleasant
2015	Champion	Score	Runner-up			
2015	#3 Wheeling Park (12–1–1)	23–15	#4 Capital (10–3–0)			
Year	First round	Score		First round	Score	
2016	#1 Martinsburg (10–0–0)	69–0	#16 Hedgesville (5–5–0)	#8 George Washington (7–3–0)	37–6	#9 Wheeling Park (7–3–0)
2016	#12 Hurricane (6–4–0)	38–14	#5 University (8–2–0)	#4 Morgantown (8–2–0)	25–7	#13 Spring Mills (6–4–0)
2016	#14 Jefferson (5–5–0)	36–0	#3 Musselman (8–2–0)	#6 Capital (7–3–0)	28–7	#11 Cabell Midland (6–4–0)
2016	#10 South Charleston (6–4–0)	31–28	#7 (New) Huntington	#2 Spring Valley (9–1–0)	54–7	#15 Buckhannon-Upshur (5–4–0)
2016	Quarter-finals	Score		Quarter-finals	Score	
2016	Martinsburg	34–0	George Washington	Morgantown	29–14	Hurricane
2016	Capital	33–7	Jefferson	Spring Valley	55–7	South Charleston
2016	Semi-final	Score		Semi-final	Score	
2016	Martinsburg	51–0	Morgantown	Spring Valley	20–14	Capital
2016	Champion	Score	Runner-up			
2016	#1 Martinsburg (5) (14–0–0)	49–7	#2 Spring Valley (12–2–0)			
Year	First round	Score		First round	Score	
2017	#1 (New) Huntington (10–0–0)	44–14	#16 South Charleston (4–6–0)	#9 Hurricane (6–4–0)	52–21	#8 Hedgesville (7–3–0)
2017	#4 Spring Valley (8–2–0)	31–0	#13 George Washington (5–5–0)	#12 Cabell Midland (5–5–0)	28–18	#5 Musselman (8–2–0)
2017	#6 Capital (7–3–0)	63–21	#11 Wheeling Park (6–4–0)	#3 University (10–0–0)	37–7	#14 Spring Mills (5–5–0)
2017	#10 John Marshall (7–3–0)	42–35	#7 Parkersburg (7–3–0)	#2 Martinsburg (10–0–0)	61–0	#15 Morgantown (4–6–0)
2017	Quarter-finals	Score		Quarter-finals	Score	
2017	(New) Huntington	28–27	Hurricane	Capital	48–24	University
2017	Spring Valley	15–0	Cabell Midland	Martinsburg	54–0	John Marshall
2017	Semi-final	Score		Semi-final	Score	
2017	Martinsburg	49–28	Capital	Spring Valley	10–7	(New) Huntington
2017	Champion	Score	Runner-up			
2017	#2 Martinsburg (6) (14–0–0)	44–16	#4 Spring Valley (11–3–0)			
Year	First round	Score		First round	Score	
2018	#1 Martinsburg (10–0–0)	35–0	#16 Hurricane (5–5–0)	#9 Parkersburg (6–4–0)	28–21	#8 Wheeling Park (7–3–0)
2018	#5 Ripley (9–1–0)	43–15	#12 Greenbrier East (6–4–0)	#4 Musselman (9–1–0)	60–14	#13 John Marshall (6–4–0)
2018	#3 Capital (9–1–0)	42–0	#14 Morgantown (5–5–0)	#11 Hedgesville (6–4–0)	35–29	#6 Parkersburg South (7–3–0)
2018	#7 (New) Huntington (7–3–0)	14–7	#10 Cabell-Midland (6–4–0)	#2 Spring Valley (10–0–0)	77–7	#15 Spring Mills (5–5–0)
2018	Quarter-finals	Score		Quarter-finals	Score	
2018	Martinsburg	49–20	Parkersburg	Musselman	52–7	Ripley
2018	Capital	48–14	Hedgesville	Spring Valley	36–0	(New) Huntington
2018	Semi-final	Score		Semi-final	Score	
2018	Martinsburg	42–14	Musselman	Spring Valley	56–14	Capital
2018	Champion	Score	Runner-up			
2018	#1 Martinsburg(7) (14–0–0)	31–7	#2 Spring Valley (13–1–0)			
Year	First round	Score		First round	Score	
2019	#1 Martinsburg (10–0–0)	84–0	#16 Preston (4–6–0)	#9 Spring Mills (6–4–0)	28–27	#8 Greenbrier East (7–3–0)
2019	#5 Musselman (8–2–0)	48–29	#12 Parkersburg (5–5–0)	#4 Parkersburg South (9–1–0)	47–13	#13 South Charleston (4–6–0)
2019	#3 Spring Valley (9–1–0)	34–6	#14 Hurricane (4–6–0)	#11 Capital (5–5–0)	45–21	#6 Wheeling Park (8–2–0)
2019	#7 George Washington (7–3–0)	17–10	#10 Huntington (5–5–0)	#2 Cabel-Midland (10–0–0)	42–6	#15 Riverside (4–6–0)
2019	Quarter-finals	Score		Quarter-finals	Score	
2019	Martinsburg	70–0	Spring Mills	Parkersburg South	52–33	Musselman
2019	Spring Valley	30–0	Capital	Cabel-Midland	28–18	George Washington
2019	Semi-finals	Score		Semi-finals	Score	
2019	Martinsburg	77–20	Parkersburg South	Cabel-Midland	31–0	Spring Valley
2019	Champion	Score	Runner-up			
2019	#1 Martinsburg(8) (14–0–0)	49–21	#2 Cabel-Midland (13–1–0)			

In 2020 the COVID-19 epidemic effected the football season greatly. Health officials developed a map, which was published each Saturday, and used to determine which counties could participate in WVSSAC activities the upcoming week.

Year	First round	Score		First round	Score	
2020	#1 Cabell-Midland (5–0–0)	Cabell-Midland granted win due to COVID-19 numbers in Marshall County	#16 John Marshall (5–4–0)	#9 Spring Mills (5–2–0)	Spring Mills granted win due to COVID-19 numbers in Wood County	#8 Parkersburg (6–2–0)
2020	#5 Bridgeport (6–1–0)	55–7	#12 Washington (5–4–0)	#4 Martinsburg (4–1–0)	62–0	#13 George Washington (3–2–0)
2020	#3 Musselman (6–1–0)	64–26	#14 University (3–3–0)	#6 Spring Valley (4–1–0)	Spring Valley granted win due to COVID-19 numbers in Putnam County	#11 Hurricane (4–2–0)
2020	#10 Princeton (6–2–0)	Princeton granted win due to COVID-19 numbers in Ohio County	#7 Wheeling Park (7–1–0)	#2 South Charleston (5–0–0)	S. Charleston granted win due to COVID-19 numbers in Jackson County	#15 Ripley (6–3–0)
2020	Quarter-finals	Score		Quarter-finals	Score	
2020	Cabell-Midland	Cabell-Midland granted win due to COVID-19 numbers in Berkeley County	Spring Mills	Bridgeport	Bridgeport granted win due to COVID-19 numbers in Berkeley County	Martinsburg
2020	Musselman	Musselman granted win due to COVID-19 numbers in Wayne County	Spring Valley	South Charleston	57–18	Princeton
2020	Semi-finals	Score		Semi-finals	Score	
2020	Bridgeport	Bridgeport granted win due to COVID-19 numbers in Cabell County	Cabell-Midland	South Charleston	S. Charleston granted win due to COVID-19 numbers in Berkeley County	Musselman
2020	Champion	Score	Runner-up			
2020	#2 South Charleston (6–0–0)	S. Charleston granted win due to COVID-19 numbers in Harrison County	#5 Bridgeport (7–1–0)			

==== 2021-2023 ====
Year	First Round	Score		First Round	Score	
2021	#1 (New) Huntington (11–0–0)	48–21	#16 Wheeling Park (4–5–0)	#9 George Washington (8–3–0)	21–7	#8 Greenbrier East (8–3–0)
2021	#5 Cabell Midland (10–1–0)	49–12	#12 South Charleston (5–6–0)	#4 University (11–0–0)	52–10	#13 Woodrow Wilson (5–6–0)
2021	#3 Bridgeport (11–0–0)	34–7	#14 Morgantown (5–6–0)	#6 Jefferson (10–1–0)	31–18	#11 Hurricane (6–5–0)
2021	#2 Martinsburg (10–1–0)	83–20	#15 Parkersburg South (5–6–0)	#7 Spring Valley (9–2–0)	56–14	#10 Princeton (5–4–0)
2021	Quarterfinals	Score		Quarterfinals	Score	
2021	(New) Huntington (12–0–0)	29–13	George Washington (8–4–0)	Cabell Midland (11–1–0)	46–21	University (11–1–0)
2021	Bridgeport (12–0–0)	74–49	Jefferson (10–2–0)	Martinsburg (11–1–0)	42–6	Spring Valley (9–3–0)
2021	Semifinal	Score		Semifinal	Score	
2021	(New) Huntington (13–0–0)	37–15	Cabell Midland (11–2–0)	Martinsburg (12–1–0)	21–0	Bridgeport (12–1–0)
2021	Champion	Score	Runner-up			
2021	#2 Martinsburg (9) (13–1–0)	62–21	#1 (New) Huntington (13–1–0)			
Year	First Round	Score		First Round	Score	
2022	#1 Parkersburg South (9–1–0)	78–12	#16 Hedgesville (5–5–0)	#8 Musselman (7–3–0)	28–23	#9 Wheeling Park (7–3–0)
2022	#2 (New) Huntington (9–1–0)	62–22	#15 Woodrow Wilson (6–4–0)	#10 Jefferson (7–3–0)	34–14	#7 Spring Valley (8–2–0)
2022	#3 Martinsburg (8–2–0)	42–14	#14 Morgantown (6–4–0)	#6 Bridgeport (8–2–0)	41–13	#11 Cabell Midland (6–3–0)
2022	#4 Hurricane (8–2–0)	56–13	#13 University (7–3–0)	#5 George Washington (8–2–0)	31–28	#12 Princeton (6–4–0)
2022	Quarterfinals	Score		Quarterfinals	Score	
2022	Parkersburg South	58–14	Musselman	(New) Huntington	51–7	Jefferson
2022	Martinsburg	21–3	Bridgeport	Hurricane	56–28	George Washington
2022	Semifinals	Score		Semifinals	Score	
2022	Parkersburg South	58–27	Hurricane	(New) Huntington	28–21	Martinsburg
2022	Champion	Score	Runner-up			
2022	#2(New) Huntington	28–3	#1Parkersburg South			
Year	First Round	Score		First Round	Score	
2023	#1 Cabell Midland (9–1–0)	63–22	#16 Musselman (4–7–0)	#2 (New) Huntington (9–1–0)	59–13	#15 Morgantown (7–3–0)
2023	#3 Martinsburg (9–0–0)	55–7	#14 Parkersburg South (6–4–0)	#13 Parkersburg (7–3–0)	47–23	#4 Hurricane (8–2–0)
2023	#5 Princeton (9–1–0)	37–7	#12 Oak Hill (8–2–0)	#6 Jefferson (8–2–0)	21–14	#11 Wheeling Park (7–2–0)
2023	#7 Spring Mills (8–2–0)	20–17	#10 Spring Valley (6–4–0)	#8 Bridgeport (9–1–0)	28–27	George Washington (6–4–0)
2023	Quarterfinals	Score		Quarterfinals	Score	
2023	Bridgeport	41–21	Cabell Midland	(New) Huntington	41–6	Spring Mills
2023	Martinsburg	49–0	Jefferson	Princeton	41–37	Parkersburg
2023	Semifinals	Score		Semifinals	Score	
2023	Martinsburg	49–26	(New) Huntington	Princeton	73–70	Bridgeport
2023	Champion	Score	Runner-up			
2023	#3 Martinsburg (10)	57–13	#5 Princeton			

== See also ==
- West Virginia High School Football State Championships and playoff history
- West Virginia High School Football State Championships and playoff history (2024–present)
- West Virginia Secondary School Activities Commission
- WVSSAC Super Six Football Championships
- Four Seasons Football historical high school football results for WV & VA
