= West Virginia High School Football State Championships and playoff history =

The West Virginia High School Football State Championships have been held since the early 1900s. The West Virginia Secondary School Activities Commission (WVSSAC) began its formal recognition of WV State Football Championships in 1937 with the state's sports writers' vote. The WVSSAC began a class system, dividing larger and smaller schools in 1947. WVSSAC official playoff games began in 1948. Prior to the WVSSAC's involvement in an official playoff, there were other systems in play. From 1916 to 1955 the WVSSAC was called the West Virginia Athletic Association.

== History ==
=== Getting started ===
In the early 1900s, teams claimed state titles by virtue of their records against other WV schools. Some of the major newspapers would have input as well. Often coaches would contact one another and arrange championship games themselves. This system may have been flawed, but it was what most WV schools used for at least 33 years.

=== Segregation ===
Before Brown vs. Board of Education in 1954, high school football was segregated just like the schools. About 45 colored schools existed in WV. More than 25 Black school football programs existed in West Virginia during segregation. In 1914, WV's Black leaders came together and formed what would become the West Virginia Athletic Union (WVAU), which would govern high school athletic championships in WV for African American students. The WVAU ceased to exist in 1956, as only two schools remained in the organization.

=== Private schools ===
Prior to 1977 most private schools did not participate in the WVSSAC or its football playoff system. Nearly all the private schools that fielded football teams were Catholic, so the WVCHSAA was formed. In 1962 Catholic leadership began a championship game process for their schools. The West Virginia Catholic State Football Champion was crowned until the 1976 season. Wheeling Central Catholic joined the WVSSAC in 1970. By 1977 the WVCHSAA numbers were so low the organization was dissolved.

=== Tie breakers ===
Prior to 1965 season, games played against teams in a higher class were not considered in the point system if the smaller school lost. Before 1976, if two teams tied for the last playoff spot they were both removed from the playoff. This happened in 1963 when Charleston and Welch both tied for the #2 playoff position. #1 Buckhannon-Upshur was awarded the AAA title without a game. In 1975, in single A, both Meadow Bridge and Rivesville finished the regular season 10–0–0, but tied for the #4 playoff spot. They were both eliminated and #1 Wirt was given a bye. There is now a tie break system for teams whose playoff points average out the same.

=== Location ===
Championship games were played in a variety of locations over the years, but that changed in 1979. From 1979 to 1993 the three WV Football Championship games were played at Laidley Field, now University of Charleston Stadium at Laidley Field in Charleston. The West Virginia State High School Football Championship games were played at Wheeling Island Stadium from 1994 to 2023. In 2024, the championship games returned to UC Stadium at Laidley Field.

=== Eras and classes ===
The different eras of West Virginia State Football Championships are listed below: A small number of West Virginia high schools sponsored football teams prior to 1900, but the first known game played between two West Virginia schools occurred in 1901 when Huntington High met Charleston High. The first claimed state title that has been discovered, so far, was Fairmont Senior in 1903. It is not yet certain if state titles were claimed every season between 1903 and 1915.

- 1903–1915: Prior to WVSSAC or formal sportswriters vote: Single-class system, games arranged by individual teams, 1903 & 1907 Fairmont Senior.
- 1916–1936: WV Athletic Association (known as the West Virginia Secondary School Activities Commission after 1955) formed to help regulate high school athletics in WV. State football champions were still selected by schools arranging games and sports writers' input.
- 1914–1956: Colored School State Champions. Before the historic Brown vs. Board of Education Supreme Court ruling, in 1954, schools, and football games, were segregated. African Americans were forced to play in their own league. The West Virginia Athletic Union governed African American athletics during this time.
- 1937–1946: Single-class system. Champion was named by the West Virginia Sportswriters Association.
- 1947–1954: Two-class system. Schools were placed in Class A or B based on enrollment.
- 1955–1957: Three-class system, with Class AA, Class A or B based on enrollment.
- 1958–2023: Three-class system, based on enrollment, with Classes AAA, AA and A.
- 2024–present: Four-class system, based on enrollment, location and economics with Classes AAAA, AAA, AA and A.

From 1947 to 1954, there were only two classes; Class A (big schools) and Class B (small schools). From 1955 to 1957, there were three classes; Class AA (big schools), Class A (medium-sized schools) and Class B (small schools). From 1958 to 2023 there have been three classes as well, however the names have been changed to: Class AAA (big schools), Class AA (medium-sized schools) and Class A (small schools). From 2024 to the present there have been four classes: Class AAAA (big schools), Class AAA (medium-big schools), Class AA (medium-small schools) and Class A (small schools).

== Schools with multiple football championships ==
(*school no longer exists) 63 schools have won multiple football championships, 32 of which have since been consolidated. Wheeling Central Catholic has won the most titles, with 18, five of which were Catholic State Championships.

Titles	School	Years
18	Wheeling Central (Note: includes five Catholic state titles prior to private schools being allowed in WVSSAC playoffs)	1963, (Note: WV Catholic State Champion) 1964, 1965, 1966, 1967, 1979 (AA), 2000 (A), 2002 (A), 2004 (A), 2005 (A), 2006 (A), 2007 (A), 2010 (A), 2011 (A), 2017 (A), 2018 (A), 2019 (A), 2025 (A)
17	Parkersburg	1911, 1918, 1919, 1921, 1922, 1927, 1938, 1940, 1943, 1950 (A), 1958 (AAA), 1976 (AAA), 1978 (AAA), 1999 (AAA), 2001 (AAA), 2006 (AAA), 2007 (AAA)
11	Bluefield	1959 (AAA), 1962 (AAA), 1965 (AAA), 1967 (AAA), 1975 (AAA), 1984 (AAA), 1997 (AA), 2004 (AA), 2007 (AA), 2009 (AA), 2017 (AA)
11	Bridgeport	1955 (A), 1972 (AAA), 1979 (AAA), 1986 (AA), 1988 (AA), 2000 (AA), 2013 (AA), 2014 (AA), 2015 (AA), 2019 (AA), 2024 (AAA)
11	Martinsburg	2010 (AAA), 2011 (AAA), 2012 (AAA), 2013 (AAA), 2016 (AAA), 2017 (AAA), 2018 (AAA), 2019 (AAA), 2021 (AAA), 2023 (AAA), 2024 (AAAA)
11	Ceredo-Kenova* (Note: Consolidated into Spring Valley High School in 1998.)	1963 (AA), 1965 (AA), 1967 (AA), 1971 (AA), 1974 (AA), 1975 (AA), 1978 (AA), 1980 (AA), 1981 (AA), 1983 (AA), 1994 (A)
9	Charleston* (Note: Consolidated into Capital High School in 1989.)	1920, 1922, 1924, 1933, 1939, 1968 (AAA), 1969 (AAA), 1970 (AAA), 1988 (AAA)
9	Fairmont Senior	1903, 1907, 1924, 1929, 1946, 2018 (AA), 2020 (AA), 2021 (AA), 2023 (AA)
8	(Old) Huntington* (Note: Consolidated with Huntington East High School in 1996 into New Huntington High School.)	1909, 1912, 1917, 1922, 1923, 1928, 1930, 1934
8	Weir	1935, 1942, 1949 (A), 1957 (AA), 1960 (AAA), 1961 (AAA), 1998 (AA), 2005 (AA)
7	East Bank* (Note: Consolidated into Riverside High School in 1999.)	1964 (AAA), 1971 (AAA), 1973 (AAA), 1989 (AA), 1990 (AA), 1993 (AA), 1996 (AA)
7	Morgantown	1927, 1983 (AAA), 2000 (AAA), 2002 (AAA), 2004 (AAA), 2005 (AAA), 2025 (AAAA)
7	Weirton-Madonna (Note: includes four Catholic titles prior to private schools being allowed in WVSSAC playoffs)	1968, 1971, 1972, 1975, 1987 (A), 2009 (A), 2013 (A)
6	Moorefield	1996 (A), 1997 (A), 1998 (A), 1999 (A), 2001 (A), 2003 (A)
6	Poca	1950 (B), 1977 (AA), 1994 (AA), 2001 (AA), 2002 (AA), 2003 (AA)
6	Sistersville* (Note: Consolidated into Tyler Consolidated High School in 1993.)	1953(B), 1964 (A), 1980 (A), 1981 (A), 1984 (A), 1985 (A), 1986 (A)
5	Buckhannon High (Note: consolidated with Upshur High School to form Buckhannon-Upshur High School 1933.)/ Buckhannon-Upshur	1915, 1918, 1924, 1963 (AAA), 1966 (AAA)
5	Frederick Douglass* (Note: WVAU State Champions during segregation)	1920, 1921, 1922, 1937, 1947
5	Monongah* (Note: Consolidated into North Marion High School in 1979.)	1952 (B), 1955 (B), 1968 (A), 1969 (A), 1973 (A)
5	South Charleston	1945, 1994 (3A), 2008 (AAA), 2009 (AAA), 2020 (AAA)
5	Vinson*	1948 (B), 1950 (B), 1951 (B), 1956 (B), 1957 (A)
5	Wheeling* (Note: consolidated with Wheeling, Triadelphia, Warwood and West Liberty into Wheeling Park High School 1976.)	1908, 1913, 1916, 1922, 1925
5	Winfield	1960 (A), 1961 (A), 1963 (A), 1985 (AA), 1987 (AA)
4	Capital	1989 (AAA), 1991 (AAA), 1995 (AAA), 2014 (AAA)
4	Charleston Catholic	1962, 1969, 1973, 1976
4	DuBois*	1936, 1938, 1939, 1942
4	Fairmont-Dunbar*	1931, 1934, 1943, 1953
4	Garnet*	1923, 1930, 1933, 1950
4	Grafton	1952 (A), 1956 (AA), 1984 (AA), 2008 (AA)
4	Magnolia	1926, 1964 (AA), 2010 (AA), 2015 (A)
4	Ravenswood	1957 (B), 1959 (A), 1972 (AA), 1976 (AA)
4	Williamson* (Note: consolidated with Gilbert, Matewan and Burch High Schools to form Mingo Central High School 2011.)	1926, 1944, 1960 (AA), 1961 (AA)
4	Williamstown	2008 (A), 2014 (A), 2022 (A), 2023 (A)
4	Woodrow Wilson	1947 (A), 1948 (A), 1951 (A), 1977 (AAA)
3	Benwood Union* (Note: consolidated into John Marshall High School 1968.)	1926, 1928, 1931
3	Brooke	1985 (AAA), 1987 (AAA), 1990 (AAA)
3	Duval* (Note: Consolidated into Lincoln County High School in 2006.)	1978 (A), 1982 (A), 1990 (A)
3	Kelly Miller*	1927, 1928, 1929
3	Keyser	1956 (A), 1962 (AA), 1969 (AA)
3	Mannington*	1922, 1976 (A), 1977 (A)
3	Mount Hope* (Note: Merged into Oak Hill High School in 2011.)	1959 (AA), 1960 (AA), 1989 (A)
3	Musselman	1974 (A), 1982 (AA), 1995 (AA)
3	North Marion	1980 (AAA), 1981 (AAA), 1997 (AAA)
3	St. Marys	1922, 2016 (A), 2020 (A)
3	Stonewall Jackson*	1947(A), 1974 (AAA), 1986 (AAA)
3	Stratton* (Note: Rev. Daniel Stratton High School, Beckley, WV, Raleigh County, West Virginia)	1941, 1946, 1954
3	Wayne	2006 (AA), 2011 (AA), 2012 (AA)
2	Anstead* (Note: Consolidated into Midland Trail High School in 1976.)	1971 (AA), 1972 (AA)
2	Aracoma*	1948, 1949
2	Big Creek* (Note: consolidated into River View High School 2009.)	1932, 1934
2	Doddridge County (Note: formed by consolidating Carr and West Union High Schools in 1933.)	1933, 1936
2	DuPont*	1992 (AAA), 1993 (AAA)
2	Excelsior*	1935, 1945
2	Frankfort	2024 (AA), 2025 (AA)
2	Gary* (Note: Consolidated into Mount View High School in 1975.)	1966 (AA), 1970 (AA)
2	Gary District*	1932, 1956
2	Hinton* (Note: Consolidated into Summers County High School in 1995.)	1937, 1968 (AA)
2	Meadow Bridge	1958 (A), 1988 (A)
2	Mullens* (Note: Consolidated into Wyoming East High School in 1998.)	1941, 1959 (AA)
2	Paden City	1970 (A), 1979 (A)
2	Roosevelt-Wilson - Clarksburg* (Note: consolidated into Robert C. Byrd High School 1995.)	1929, 1958 (AA)
2	Sumner*	1917, 1921
2	Victory-Clarksburg* (Note: Victory, Salem and Bristol consolidated in 1973 to form Liberty High School.)	1925, 1935
2	Washington Irving-Clarksburg*	1922, 1926
2	Wahama	2012 (A), 2024 (A)

== Schools with one football championship ==
(*school no longer exists) There are 37 WV schools that have one state football championship. Of those 37, 21 have been closed or consolidated into new schools.

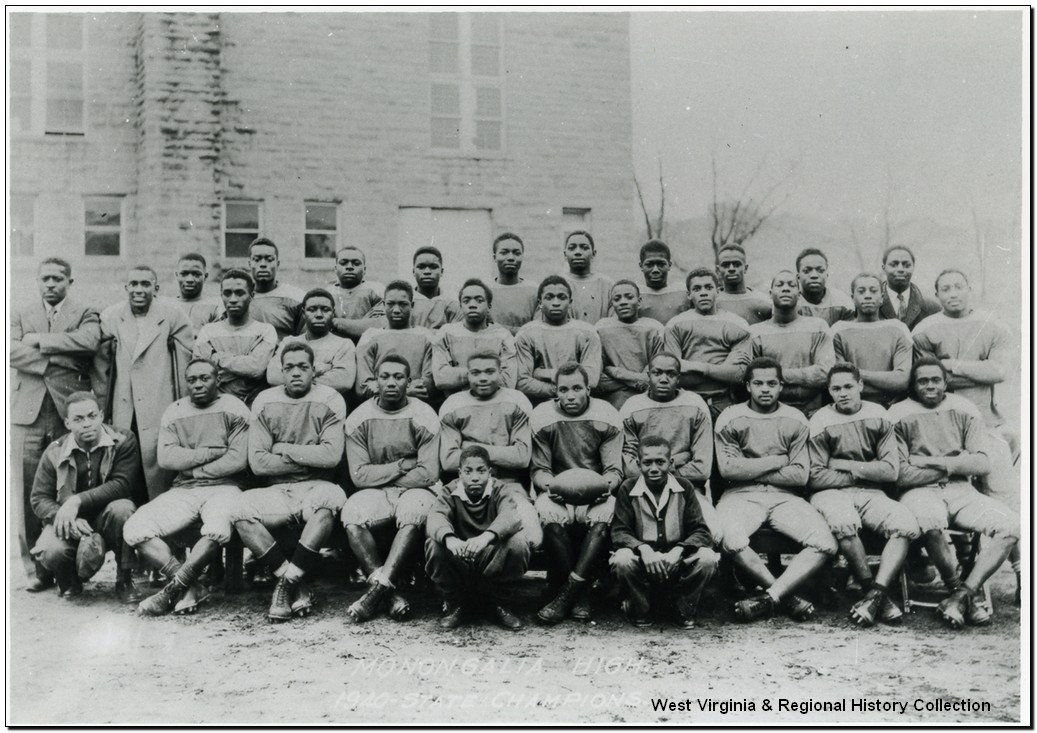
1940 WVAU State Champions, Monongalia High School. Monongalia High was a school for Black students prior to integration. MHS won one WV state title. The WV Athletic Union (WVAU) governed athletics for African American students from 1914 to 1956.

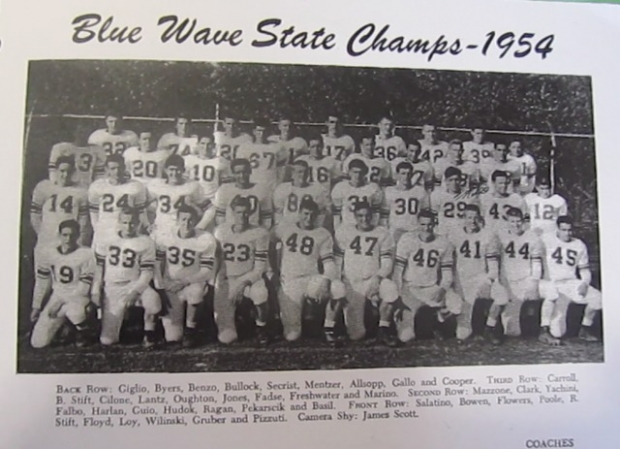
The 1954 Follansbee High School WVSSAC Class "A" Football Champions. In 1954, WV had just two school size classifications; "A" for bigger schools and "B" for smaller schools. The WVSSAC started a three-class system in 1955. Follansbee High is one of 37 schools that won a single WV State Football title. Follansbee consolidated with Wellsburg and Bethany High Schools in 1969 to form Brooke High School.

School	Year
Booker T. Washington*	1926
Elkins	1928
Monongalia*	1940
Elkhorn*	1944
Webster Springs*	1947 (B)
Romney*	1949 (B)
Conley*	1951
Kimball*	1952
Barboursville*	1953 (A)
Farmington*	1954 (B)
Follansbee*	1954 (A)
Byrd Prillerman*	1955
St. Albans	1955 (AA)
Rainelle*	1962 (A)
Crum*	1965 (A)
Wirt County	1966 (A)
Marlinton*	1967 (A)
Parkersburg Catholic	1970
Northfork*	1973 (AA)
Notre Dame-Clarksburg	1974
Ridgeley*	1975 (A)
George Washington	1982 (AAA)
Tyler County*	1983 (A)
Peterstown*	1991 (A)
Spencer*	1991 (AA)
Fayetteville*	1992 (A)
Buffalo-Wayne*	1992 (AA)
Matewan*	1993 (A)
Gilbert*	1995 (A)
John Marshall	1996 (AAA)
Nitro	1998 (AAA)
Wyoming East	1999 (AA)
Parkersburg South	2003 (AAA)
Wheeling Park	2015 (AAA)
Mingo Central	2016 (AA)
Ritchie County	2021 (A)
(New) Huntington	2022 (AAA)
Independence	2022 (AA)
Princeton	2025 (AAA)

== Runners-up ==
(*school no longer exists)

Times	School	Years
8	Bluefield	1995 (AA), 1999 (AA), 2002 (AA), 2003 (AA), 2005 (AA), 2018 (AA), 2019 (AA), 2025 (AA)
8	Williamstown	1961 (A), 2003 (A), 2005 (A), 2006 (A), 2007 (A), 2011 (A), 2018 (A), 2021 (A)
6	Parkersburg	1959 (AAA), 1962 (AAA), 1974 (AAA), 1985 (AAA), 1997 (AAA), 2000 (AAA)
6	Weirton-Madonna	1966, (Note: Catholic State Title Game) 1973, 1974, 2004 (A), 2008 (A), 2012 (A)
5	Brooke	1980 (AAA), 1986 (AAA), 1992 (AAA), 2009 (AAA), 2010 (AAA)
5	Fairmont Senior	1957 (AA), 1977 (AAA), 1981 (AAA), 2016 (AA), 2017 (AA)
5	Magnolia	1972 (AA), 1981 (AA), 1992 (AA), 1993 (AA), 2008 (AA)
5	Martinsburg	2001 (AAA), 2003 (AAA), 2004 (AAA), 2006 (AAA), 2025 (AAAA)
5	Valley-Wetzel	1993 (A), 1994 (A), 1995 (A), 1996 (A), 1998 (A)
5	Wirt County	1949 (B), 1955 (B), 1967 (A), 1970 (A), 1975 (A)
4	DuPont*	1972 (AAA), 1976 (AAA), 1978 (AAA), 1998 (AA)
4	Man	1977 (AA), 1980 (AA), 1984 (AA), 2009 (A)
4	St. Albans	1961 (AAA), 1968 (AAA), 1979 (AAA), 2007 (AAA)
4	Wayne	2000 (AA), 2004 (AA), 2009 (AA), 2013 (AA)
4	Winfield	1952 (B), 1958 (A), 1959 (A), 1988 (AA)
3	Barboursville*	1954 (A), 1983 (AAA), 1984 (AAA)
3	Big Creek*	1952 (A), 1976 (AA), 1997 (A)
3	Capital	1993 (AAA), 1996 (AAA), 2015 (AAA)
3	Ceredo-Kenova*	1966 (AA), 1973 (AA), 1982 (AA)
3	Charleston-Catholic	1963, 1964, 1972
3	Greenbrier West	1991 (AA), 2013 (A), 2023 (A)
3	Matewan*	1987 (A), 1991 (A), 1992 (A)
3	Monongah*	1956 (B), 1967 (AA), 1972 (A)
3	Mt. Hope*	1961 (AA), 1964 (AA), 1965 (AA)
3	Nitro	1960 (AAA), 2005 (AAA), 2025 (AAA)
3	Notre Dame-Clarksburg	1970, 1975, 1980 (A)
3	Oceana*	1968 (AA), 1970 (AA), 1971 (AA)
3	Sissonville	1951 (B), 1958 (AA), 1994 (AA)
3	Spring Valley	2016 (AAA), 2017 (AAA), 2018 (AAA)
2	Alderson*	1948 (B), 1960 (A)
2	Bishop Donahue*	1971, 1979 (A)
2	Bridgeport	2001 (AA), 2020 (AAA)
2	Buffalo-Wayne*	1979 (AA), 1985 (AA)
2	Cabell Midland	2012 (AAA), 2019 (AAA)
2	Doddridge County	1978 (A), 2019 (A)
2	East Hardy	2015 (A), 2016 (A)
2	Fairview*	1964 (A), 1971 (A)
2	Fayetteville*	1984 (A), 1999 (A)
2	George Washington	2008 (AAA), 2011 (AAA)
2	(Old) Huntington*	1964 (AAA), 1966 (AAA)
2	(New) Huntington	2013 (AAA), 2021 (AAA)
2	James Monroe	2007 (AA), 2022 (A)
2	Keyser	1957 (A), 2012 (AA)
2	Moorefield	2000 (A), 2002 (A)
2	Morgantown	1971 (AAA), 1998 (AAA)
2	Morgantown-St. Francis*	1976, 1985 (A)
2	Musselman	1983 (AA), 1989 (AA)
2	Northfork*	1963 (A), 1974 (AA)
2	North Marion	1982 (AAA), 2023 (AA)
2	Paden City	1968 (A), 1969 (A)
2	Parkersburg South	2002 (AAA), 2022 (AAA)
2	Peterstown*	1981 (A), 1990 (A)
2	Pineville*	1977 (A), 1988 (A)
2	Poca	1978 (AA), 1996 (AA)
2	Rupert*	1954 (B), 1957 (B)
2	South Charleston	1975 (AAA), 2014 (AAA)
2	St. Marys	2014 (A), 2017 (A)
2	Stonewall Jackson*	1967 (AAA), 1987 (AAA)
2	Tolsia	2006 (AA), 2015 (AA)
2	Tucker County	1986 (AA), 1987 (AA)
2	Herbert Hoover	2022 (AA), 2024 (AAA)
2	Wheeling Central	1962, 2001 (A)
1	Benwood Union*	1953 (A)
1	Buckhannon-Upshur	1969 (AAA)
1	Cameron	2024 (A)
1	Clay-Battelle	2025 (A)
1	Crum*	1966 (A)
1	Dunbar*	1965 (AAA)
1	East Bank*	1958 (AAA)
1	Frankfort	2014 (AA)
1	Gary*	1951 (A)
1	Gauley Bridge*	1976 (A)
1	Grafton	1997 (AA)
1	Greenbrier East	1988 (AAA)
1	Hamlin*	1974 (A)
1	Hedgesville	1995 (AAA)
1	Hinton*	1963 (AA)
1	Independence	2021 (AA)
1	Masontown-Valley*	1965 (A)
1	Milton*	1949 (A)
1	Mt. View	1990 (AAA)
1	Mullens*	1956 (A)
1	Nicholas County	1962 (AA)
1	Oak Hill	1950 (A)
1	Parkersburg Catholic	1969
1	Point Pleasant	2011 (AA)
1	Princeton	2023 (AAA)
1	Ravenswood	2010 (AAA)
1	Ritchie County	2020 (A)
1	Riverside	1999 (AAA)
1	Roane County	2024 (AA)
1	Robert C. Byrd	2020 (AA)
1	Romney*	1953 (B)
1	Sherman	1975 (AA)
1	Sistersville*	1983 (A)
1	Sophia*	1962 (A)
1	South Harrison	1973 (A)
1	Spencer*	1990 (AA)
1	Spring Mills	2024 (AAAA)
1	Tyler County*	1986 (A)
1	University	1994 (AAA)
1	Victory-Clarksburg*	1970 (AAA)
1	Wahama	2010 (A)
1	Webster Springs*	1955 (A)
1	Weir	1973 (AAA)
1	Wheeling Park	1991 (AAA)

- WVSSAC State Football Champions

== See also ==
- West Virginia High School Football State Championships and playoff history (2024-present)
- West Virginia High School Football State Championships and playoff history (1903–2023)
- West Virginia Secondary School Activities Commission
- WVSSAC Super Six Football Championships
- Four Seasons Football historical high school football results for WV & VA
