= West Virginia High School Football State Championships and playoff history (2024–present) =

The West Virginia High School Football State Championships have been held since the early 1900s. The West Virginia Secondary School Activities Commission (WVSSAC) began its formal recognition of WV State Football Championships in 1937 with the state's sports writers' vote. The WVSSAC began a class system, dividing larger and smaller schools in 1947. WVSSAC official playoff games began in 1948. Prior to the WVSSAC's involvement in an official playoff, there were other systems in play. From 1916 to 1955 the WVSSAC was called the West Virginia Athletic Association.

== Four-class system (AAAA, AAA, AA, A) 2024–present / WVSSAC Ratings ==
=== 2024-2025 ===
The 2024 playoffs were delayed following multiple court actions. On December 20, 2023 - following the decision to expand to four classifications for football, cheer, volleyball, baseball, and softball, in addition to basketball - the WVSSAC released its classifications for the 2024–25 to 2027–28 academic years. Following the release of the classifications, on August 12, 2024, the WVSSAC reclassified eleven schools, after they successfully appealed. John Marshall, Oak Hill, Preston, St. Albans, and Spring Valley were moved from AAAA to AAA; Frankfort, Sissonville, and Wayne were moved from AAA to AA; and Petersburg, St. Marys, and Tyler Consolidated were moved from AA to A. Then on August 16, 2024, eleven more schools were reclassified. Buckhannon-Upshur, Capital, Riverside, and South Charleston were moved from AAAA to AAA; Chapmanville Regional, Independence, Lincoln, Nicholas County, and PikeView were moved from AAA to AA; Ritchie County and Summers County were moved from AA to A.

This change meant that schools were now scheduled to play opponents who could be worth less points for playing than had originally been thought when those twenty-two schools were classified higher. Given this, on November 8, 2024, the Wood County Board of Education, joined by its three high schools - Parkersburg, Parkersburg South, and Williamstown - filed for an injunction asking that points be awarded based upon schools original classifications and not as the schools were currently classified. On November 9, 2024, a Wood County Circuit Judge entered an order granting the injunction and ordered the WVSSAC to calculate the ratings based upon the prior classifications. Following this order, four schools that would have otherwise made the playoffs, were left out of the sixteen-team field: Hampshire and Point Pleasant were replaced by Capital and St. Albans in AAA, Westside was replaced by Lincoln in AA, and Tolsia was replaced by St. Marys in A. This led to Point Pleasant filing for an injunction in the Circuit Court of Mason County. There a circuit judge entered an order granting injunctive relief and ordering play-in games in AAA, pitting Point Pleasant against St. Albans and Hampshire against Capital. Westside also filed for injunctive relief in the Circuit Court of Wyoming County requesting that the WVSSAC return to the original rating plan. The play-in games forced the WVSSAC to postpone the other playoff games by a week and those games were set for November 16, 2024 at 1:00pm at neutral sites.

However, on November 14, 2024, the WVSSAC filed two separate petitions with the Supreme Court of Appeals of West Virginia requesting the Wood County and Mason County orders be prohibited from enforcement and requested the Court grant expedited relief. On November 15, 2024, the Supreme Court granted both motions for expedited relief and ordered responses filed in the case by noon on November 18, 2024. As a result, the play-in games in class AAA were called off, awaiting the result of the Supreme Court's ruling. Also on November 15, a Wayne County circuit judge ordered a play-in game between St. Marys and Tolsia be held within five days.

On November 19, 2024, the Supreme Court of Appeals ruled that the injunctions in Wood and Mason Counties exceeded the circuit court's authority and ruled in favor of the WVSSAC and reinstated the original football ratings.

=== 2025-2026 ===
The WVSSAC requested an emergency rule be put in place to standardize classification among schools in all of the four classification system sports (football, cheer, volleyball, boys and girls basketball, baseball, and softball) for the 2025-2026 school year. The West Virginia Board of Education gave its approval for the same on May 14, 2025.

Following this reclassification, Buckhannon-Upshur, Oak Hill, Preston, and Riverside moved up from AAA to AAAA; Chapmanville, Nicholas County, and PikeView moved up from AA to AAA; Doddridge County, Petersburg, River View, Summers County, and Tyler Consolidated moved up from A to AA; Berkeley Springs moved down from AAA to AA; and Wheeling Central Catholic moved down from AA to A.

== Class A ==
=== 2024-2030 ===
==== 2024 ====
First Round; November 22-24 at Higher Seed
1 | Tug Valley (10-0-0) | 48
16 | Tolsia (6-4-0) | 8
8 | Petersburg (5-5-0) | 49
9 | River View (7-3-0) | 8
5 | Doddridge County (8-2-0) | 28
12 | Wirt County (7-3-0) | 8
4 | Cameron (9-1-0) | 62
13 | Valley-Wetzel (7-2-0) | 0
6 | Sherman (8-2-0) | 30
11 | Tyler Consolidated (6-4-0) | 14
3 | Wahama (10-0-0) | 68
14 | Madonna (7-3-0) | 13
7 | Pendleton County (7-3-0) | 44
10 | Meadow Bridge (7-3-0) | 30
2 | Tucker County (10-0-0) | 30
15 | East Hardy (4-6-0) | 0

Quarter-finals; November 29-30 at Higher Seed
1 | Tug Valley (11-0-0) | 49
8 | Petersburg (6-5-0) | 20
5 | Doddridge County (9-2-0) | 13
4 | Cameron (10-1-0) | 28
6 | Sherman (9-2-0) | 0
3 | Wahama (11-0-0) | 61
7 | Pendleton County (8-3-0) | 0
2 | Tucker County (11-0-0) | 50

Semi-finals; December 6-7 at Higher Seed
1 | Tug Valley (12-0-0) | 0
4 | Cameron (11-1-0) | 36
3 | Wahama (12-0-0) | 29
2 | Tucker County (12-0-0) | 6

Final; December 13; 12:00pm UC Stadium at Laidley Field, Charleston
4 | Cameron (12-1-0) | 22
3 | Wahama (2) (13-0-0) | 29

==== 2025 ====
First Round; November 14-15 at Higher Seed
1 | Wheeling Central (6-2) | 51
16 | Tolsia (3-7) | 8
8 | Tucker County (6-4) | 42
9 | Tug Valley (6-4) | 28
5 | Sherman (8-2) | 20
12 | East Hardy (5-5) | 42
4 | Pendelton County (8-2) | 60
13 | Greenbrier West (4-6) | 7
6 | St. Marys (8-2) | 14
11 | Wirt County (7-3) | 27
3 | Clay-Battelle (9-1) | 44
14 | Ritchie County (4-6) | 8
7 | Cameron (6-3) | 46
10 | Meadow Bridge (7-3) | 8
2 | Wahama (10-0) | 48
15 | Man (3-7) | 22

Quarter-finals; November 21-22 at Higher Seed
1 | Wheeling Central (7-2) | 41
8 | Tucker County (7-4) | 8
12 | East Hardy (6-5) | 27
4 | Pendleton County (9-2) | 35
11 | Wirt County (8-3) | 14
3 | Clay-Battelle (10-1) | 46
7 | Cameron (7-3) | 42
2 | Wahama (11-0) | 16

Semi-finals; November 28-29 at Higher Seed
1 | Wheeling Central (8-2) | 43
4 | Pendleton County (10-2) | 20
3 | Clay-Battelle (11-1) | 24
7 | Cameron (8-3) | 12

Final; December 5; 7:00pm UC Stadium at Laidley Field, Charleston
1 | Wheeling Central (18) (9-2) | 56
3 | Clay-Battelle (12-1) | 34

==== 2026 ====
First Round; November 13-14 at Higher Seed
1 | Tug Valley (9-1) | 29
16 | Tolsia (4-6) | 12
8 | Meadow Bridge (9-1) | 30
9 | Greenbrier West (8-2) | 13
5 | Sherman (8-2) | 34
12 | Clay-Battelle (7-3) | 6
4 | East Hardy (9-1) | 50
13 | Webster County (6-4) | 36
6 | Pendleton County (7-3) | 55
11 | St. Mary's (6-4) | 13
3 | Wheeling Central (6-4) | 55
14 | Montcalm (6-4) | 14
7 | Ritchie County (7-3) | 0
10 | Cameron (6-4) | 21
2 | Wahama (9-1) | 58
15 | Tucker County (4-6) | 0

Quarter-finals; November 20-21 at Higher Seed
1 | Tug Valley (10-1) | 42
8 | Meadow Bridge (10-1) | 2
5 | Sherman (9-2) | 22
4 | East Hardy (10-1) | 55
6 | Pendleton County (8-3) | 21
3 | Wheeling Central (7-4) | 20
10 | Cameron (7-4) | 7
2 | Wahama (10-1) | 39

Semi-finals; November 27-28 at Higher Seed
1 | Tug Valley (11-1)
4 | East Hardy (11-1)
6 | Pendleton County (9-3)
2 | Wahama (11-1)

Final; December 5; 12:00pm UC Stadium at Laidley Field, Charleston

== Class AA ==
=== 2024-2030 ===
==== 2024 ====
First Round; November 22-24 at Higher Seed
1 | Frankfort (10-0-0) | 45
16 | Westide (7-3-0) | 0
8 | Bluefield (4-5-0) | 20
9 | South Harrison (8-2-0) | 18
5 | Wheeling Central (8-2-0) | 41
12 | Nicholas County (6-4-0) | 20
4 | Williamstown (8-2-0) | 47
13 | Moorefield (4-6-0) | 21
6 | Philip Barbour (7-3-0) | 28
11 | Clay County (7-3-0) | 17
3 | Independence (6-3-0) | 41
14 | James Monroe (7-3-0) | 23
7 | Scott (8-2-0) | 40
10 | Wayne (6-4-0) | 12
2 | Roane County (10-0-0) | 35
15 | Chapmanville Regional (5-5-0) | 14

Quarter-finals; November 29-30 at Higher Seed
1 | Frankfort (11-0-0) | 27
8 | Bluefield (5-5-0) | 6
5 | Wheeling Central (9-2-0) | 21
4 | Williamstown (9-2-0) | 29
6 | Phillip Barbour (8-3-0) | 17
3 | Independence (7-3-0) | 49
7 | Scott (9-2-0) | 0
2 | Roane County (11-0-0) | 21

Semi-finals; December 6 at Higher Seed
1 | Frankfort (12-0-0) | 49
4 | Williamstown (10-2-0) | 7
3 | Independence (8-3-0) | 7
2 | Roane County (12-0-0) | 42

Final; December 13; 7:00pm UC Stadium at Laidley Field, Charleston
1 | Frankfort (13-0-0) | 49
2 | Roane County (13-0-0) | 14

==== 2025 ====
First Round; November 14-15 at Higher Seed
1 | Frankfort (10-0) | 49
16 | Williamstown (5-5) | 7
8 | Mingo Central (8-2) | 24
9 | James Monroe (7-3) | 14
5 | Doddrige County (10-0) | 52
12 | Logan (8-2) | 7
4 | Independence (9-1) | 42
13 | Lincoln (4-6) | 17
6 | Roane County (9-1) | 12
11 | Clay County (7-3) | 44
3 | Philip Barbour (8-2) | 36
14 | South Harrison (6-4) | 8
7 | Midland Trail (9-1) | 27
10 | Petersburg (7-3) | 12
2 | Bluefield (8-2) | 54
15 | Oak Glen (7-3) | 7

Quarter-finals; November 21-22 at Higher Seed
1 | Frankfort (11-0) | 50
8 | Mingo Central (9-2) | 15
5 | Doddridge County (11-0) | 38
4 | Independence (10-1) | 27
11 | Clay County (8-3) | 7
3 | Philip Barbour (9-2) | 69
7 | Midland Trail (10-1) | 7
2 | Bluefield (9-2) | 45

Semi-finals; November 28-29 at Higher Seed
1 | Frankfort (12-0) | 28
5 | Doddridge County (12-0) | 7
3 | Philip Barbour (10-2) | 27
2 | Bluefield (10-2) | 56

Final; December 6; 12:00pm UC Stadium at Laidley Field, Charleston
1 | Frankfort (2) (13-0) | 49
2 | Bluefield (11-2) | 42

==== 2026 ====
First Round; November 13-14 at Higher Seed
1 | Frankfort (9-1) | 45
16 | Logan (7-3) | 15
8 | Doddridge County (8-2) | 52
9 | Lincoln (5-5) | 16
5 | Williamstown (9-1) | 20
12 | South Harrison (6-4) | 26
4 | Independence (7-2) | 45
13 | Moorefield (6-4) | 7
6 | Philip Barbour (7-3) | 42
11 | Clay County (7-3) | 7
3 | Bluefield (8-2) | 54
14 | James Monroe (6-4) | 18
7 | Roane County (9-1) | 44
10 | Liberty (7-3) | 7
2 | Sissonville (10-0) | 28
15 | Mingo Central (6-4) | 8

Quarter-finals; November 20-21 at Higher Seed
1 | Frankfort (10-1) | 38
8 | Doddridge County (9-2) | 15
12 | South Harrison (7-4) | 0
4 | Independence (9-2) | 63
6 | Philip Barbour (8-3) | 14
3 | Bluefield (9-2) | 45
7 | Roane County (10-1) | 42
2 | Sissonville (11-0) | 35

Semi-finals; November 27-28 at Higher Seed
1 | Frankfort (11-1)
4 | Independence (10-2)
3 | Bluefield (10-2)
7 | Roane County (11-1)

Final; December 5; 7:00pm UC Stadium at Laidley Field, Charleston

== Class AAA ==
=== 2024-2030 ===
==== 2024 ====
First Round; November 22-23 at Higher Seed
1 | Princeton (10-0-0) | 63
16 | Hampshire (5-5-0) | 9
8 | North Marion (7-3-0) | 47
9 | Ripley (7-3-0) | 10
5 | Oak Hill (9-1-0) | 27
12 | Lewis County (5-5-0) | 6
4 | Herbert Hoover (10-0-0) | 49
13 | Elkins (5-5-0) | 7
6 | Nitro (9-1-0) | 41
11 | Shady Spring (7-3-0) | 7
3 | Bridgeport (10-0-0) | 65
14 | Robert C. Byrd (4-6-0) | 0
7 | Spring Valley (7-3-0) | 54
10 | East Fairmont (5-4-0) | 6
2 | Fairmont Senior (9-1-0) | 35
15 | Point Pleasant (4-5-0) | 6

Quarter-finals; November 29-30 at Higher Seed
1 | Princeton (11-0-0) | 34
8 | North Marion (8-3-0) | 20
5 | Oak Hill (10-1-0) | 14
4 | Herbert Hoover (11-0-0) | 56
6 | Nitro (10-1-0) | 21
3 | Bridgeport (11-0-0) | 70
7 | Spring Valley (8-3-0) | 6
2 | Fairmont Senior (10-1-0) | 29

Semi-finals; December 6-7 at Higher Seed
1 | Princeton (12-0-0) | 12
4 | Herbert Hoover (12-0-0) | 35
3 | Bridgeport (12-0-0) | 36
2 | Fairmont Senior (11-1-0) | 7

Final; December 14; 12:00pm UC Stadium at Laidley Field, Charleston
4 | Herbert Hoover (13-0-0) | 7
3 | Bridgeport (11) (13-0-0) | 49

==== 2025 ====
First Round; November 14-15 at Higher Seed
1 | Bridgeport (10-0) | 56
16 | PikeView (7-3) | 6
8 | Greenbrier East (6-4) | 37
9 | Chapmanville (10-0) | 46
5 | Nitro (9-1) | 28
12 | Capital (5-5) | 7
4 | North Marion (9-1) | 42
13 | Keyser (7-3) | 31
6 | Spring Valley (7-3) | 13
11 | Elkins (7-3) | 10
3 | Fairmont Senior (8-2) | 28
14 | Robert C. Byrd (5-5) | 36
7 | Herbert Hoover (8-2) | 56
10 | Winfield (7-3) | 18
2 | Princeton (10-0) | 56
15 | Hampshire (6-4) | 6

Quarter-finals; November 21-22 at Higher Seed
1 | Bridgeport (11-0) | 27
9 | Chapmanville (11-0) | 33
5 | Nitro (10-1) | 57
4 | North Marion (10-1) | 38
6 | Spring Valley (8-3) | 28
14 | Robert C. Byrd (6-5) | 0
7 | Herbert Hoover (9-2) | 35
2 | Princeton (11-0) | 41

Semi-finals; November 29 at Higher Seed
9 | Chapmanville (12-0) | 13
5 | Nitro (11-1) | 36
6 | Spring Valley (9-3) | 0
2 | Princeton (12-0) | 27

Final; December 6; 7:00pm UC Stadium at Laidley Field, Charleston
5 | Nitro (12-1) | 35
2 | Princeton (13-0) | 36

==== 2026 ====
First Round; November 13-14 at Higher Seed
1 | Herbert Hoover (9-1) | 63
16 | Grafton (4-6) | 6
8 | Robert C. Byrd (7-3) | 14
9 | Spring Valley (5-5) | 15
5 | North Marion (9-1) | 21
12 | Fairmont Senior (3-7) | 25
4 | Bridgeport (8-2) | 56
13 | Chapmanville (7-3) | 7
6 | Winfield (8-2) | 20
11 | Ripley (6-4) | 10
3 | Elkins (9-1) | 54
14 | Keyser (6-4) | 25
7 | Princeton (6-4) | 51
10 | John Marshall (7-3) | 7
2 | South Charleston (8-2) | 49
15 | Capital (4-6) | 0

Quarter-finals; November 20-21 at Higher Seed
1 | Herbert Hoover (10-1) | 49
9 | Spring Valley (6-5) | 21
12 | Fairmont Senior (4-7) | 3
4 | Bridgeport (9-2) | 31
6 | Winfield (9-2) | 24
3 | Elkins (10-1) | 27
7 | Princeton (7-4) | 21
2 | South Charleston (9-2) | 54

Semi-finals; November 27-28 at Higher Seed
1 | Herbert Hoover (11-1)
4 | Bridgeport (10-2)
3 | Elkins (11-1)
2 | South Charleston (10-2)

Final; December 4; 12:00pm UC Stadium at Laidley Field, Charleston

== Class AAAA ==
=== 2024-2026 ===
==== 2024 ====
First Round; November 22-23 at Higher Seed
1 | Martinsburg (9-1-0) | 77
16 | Parkersburg (4-6-0) | 7
8 | Parkersburg South (5-5-0) | 24
9 | Washington (6-4-0) | 17
5 | (New) Huntington (9-1-0) | 56
12 | University (4-6-0) | 28
4 | Wheeling Park (7-3-0) | 43
13 | Musselman (2-8-0) | 0
6 | Hurricane (7-3-0) | 14
11 | George Washington (7-3-0) | 13
3 | Jefferson (7-3-0) | 48
14 | Cabell Midland (5-5-0) | 28
7 | Morgantown (7-3-0) | 35
10 | Woodrow Wilson (6-4-0) | 10
2 | Spring Mills (9-1-0) (Note: Spring Mills was ordered to forfeit four wins following a determination by the WVSSAC that an ineligible player played in those games. Later a judge in the Circuit Court of Berkeley County found that the WVSSAC decision violated federal law as the player qualified as homeless under the McKinney-Vento Act, and ordered those wins restored.) | 56
15 | Hedgesville (2-8-0) | 0

Quarter-finals; November 29-30 at Higher Seed
1 | Martinsburg (10-1-0) | 56
8 | Parkersburg South (6-5-0) | 14
5 | (New) Huntington (10-1-0) | 51
4 | Wheeling Park (8-3-0) | 39
6 | Hurricane (8-3-0) | 57
3 | Jefferson (8-3-0) | 21
7 | Morgantown (8-3-0) | 7
2 | Spring Mills (10-1-0) | 14

Semi-finals; December 7 at Higher Seed
1 | Martinsburg (11-1-0) | 35
5 | (New) Huntington (11-1-0) | 34
6 | Hurricane (9-3-0) | 7
2 | Spring Mills (11-1-0) | 49

Final; December 14; 7:00pm UC Stadium at Laidley Field, Charleston
1 | Martinsburg (11) (12-1-0) | 24
2 | Spring Mills (12-1-0) | 17

(Note: Only sixteen teams were classified as class AAAA in 2024, as such, all sixteen teams qualified for the playoffs.)

==== 2025 ====
First Round; November 14-15 at Higher Seed
1 | Morgantown (9-1) | 56
16 | Buckhannon-Upshur (2-8) | 0
8 | Spring Mills (6-4) | 31
9 | Musselman (4-6) | 21
5 | George Washington (8-2) | 58
12 | Oak Hill (5-5) | 14
4 | Jefferson (6-4) | 51
13 | Washington (3-7) | 10
6 | Wheeling Park (6-4) | 27
11 | Woodrow Wilson (5-5) | 14
3 | Martinsburg (8-2) | 58
14 | Parkersburg South (3-7) | 0
7 | University (7-3) | 62
10 | Parkersburg (5-5) | 14
2 | (New) Huntington (8-2) | 48
15 | Hedgesville (2-8) | 14

Quarter-finals; November 21-22 at Higher Seed
1 | Morgantown (10-1) | 34
8 | Spring Mills (7-4) | 33
5 | George Washington (9-2) | 21
4 | Jefferson (7-4) | 28
6 | Wheeling Park (7-4) | 35
3 | Martinsburg (9-2) | 55
7 | University (8-3) | 35
2 | (New) Huntington (9-2) | 28

Semi-finals; November 29 at Higher Seed
1 | Morgantown (11-1) | 52
4 | Jefferson (8-4) | 21
3 | Martinsburg (10-2) | 44
7 | University (9-3) | 13

Final; December 5; 12:00pm UC Stadium at Laidley Field, Charleston
1 | Morgantown (7) (12-1) | 28
3 | Martinsburg (11-2) | 21

==== 2026 ====
First Round; November 13-14 at Higher Seed
1 | George Washington (10-0) | 63
16 | Parkersburg South (1-9) | 7
8 | Spring Mills (5-5) | 35
9 | Jefferson (3-7) | 6
5 | Morgantown (8-2) | 35
12 | Wheeling Park (3-7) | 10
4 | Cabell Midland (9-1) | 62
13 | Buckhannon-Upshur (4-6) | 12
6 | (New) Huntington (7-3) | 49
11 | Woodrow Wilson (4-6) | 10
3 | University (10-0) | 62
14 | Washington (3-7) | 7
7 | Musselman (5-5) | 39
10 | Parkersburg (4-6) | 23
2 | Martinsburg (9-0) | 63
15 | Hurricane (3-7) | 0

Quarter-finals; November 20-21 at Higher Seed
1 | George Washington (11-0) | 49
8 | Spring Mills (6-5) | 0
5 | Morgantown (9-2) | 38
4 | Cabell Midland (10-1) | 28
6 | (New) Huntington (8-3) | 31
3 | University (11-0) | 24
7 | Musselman (6-5) | 0
2 | Martinsburg (10-0) | 51

Semi-finals; November 27-28 at Higher Seed
1 | George Washington (12-0)
5 | Morgantown (10-2)
6 | (New) Huntington (9-3)
2 | Martinsburg (11-0)

Final; December 4; 7:00pm UC Stadium at Laidley Field, Charleston

=== Twelve-Team Playoff (2027-present) ===
With Class AAAA being reduced to 17 teams, the WVSSAC approved a playoff format reducing the number of playoff teams in Class AAAA from 16 to 12, starting in the 2027 season. Class A, AA, and AAA however, will still have the same 16-team playoff format that has been in existence since 1991.

== See also ==
- West Virginia High School Football State Championships and playoff history
- West Virginia High School Football State Championships and playoff history (1903–2023)
- West Virginia Secondary School Activities Commission
- WVSSAC Super Six Football Championships
- Four Seasons Football historical high school football results for WV & VA
