= WVSSAC Super Six Football Championships =

The WVSSAC Super Six Football Championships was a series of high school football games, typically held on the first weekend of December, that determined the high school champions of the U.S. state of West Virginia. The tournaments that lead to the championship games, as well as regular-season competition, are governed by the West Virginia Secondary School Activities Commission (WVSSAC). The games were named "Super Six" because six teams played in the state's three championship games. However, beginning in 2024, the WVSSAC began dividing football into four classes, and no new name other than "State Football Championships" has yet benn announced. The Championship games were held at Wheeling Island Stadium in Wheeling, a two-day affair, with one game on Friday and two on Saturday, but they will return to Laidley Field in Charleston beginning in 2024 through at least 2026. The WVSSAC chose Charleston over bids from Wheeling, Bluefield, and a joint bid to split the four games between Marshall University and West Virginia University.

== History ==
The WVSSAC began conducting state football championships in 1937. Throughout its history, the competition has been divided into classes based on enrollment. The history of classifications is as follows:

- 1903–1936: Prior to WVSSAC or sportswriter involvement: Single-class system, games arranged by individual teams, 1903 & 1907 Fairmont Senior
- 1916–1956: Colored School State Champions. Before the historic Brown vs. Board of Education Supreme Court ruling, schools, and football games, were segregated. African-Americans were forced to play in their own league. The West Virginia Athletic Union governed African-American athletics during this time.
- 1937–1946: Single-class system. Champion was named by the West Virginia Sportswriters Association.
- 1947–1954: Two-class system. Schools were placed in Class A or B based on enrollment.
- 1955–1957: Three-class system, based on enrollment, with Class B, Class A or AA based on enrollment
- 1958–2023: Three-class system, based on enrollment, with Classes A, AA and AAA
- 2024-: Four-class system based on an algorithm using enrollment, distance from a large town, and economic health of the community

In 1947 in Class B, 1947 and 1948 in Class A, and 1955 and 1956 in Class AA, there were no actual championship games. Those championships was awarded based on ratings. Class B was only in use from 1947 through 1957.

From 1947 to 1954, there were only two classes: Class A (big schools) and Class B (small schools). From 1955 to 1957, there were three classes; Class AA (big schools), Class A (medium-sized schools) and Class B (small schools). From 1958 to 2023 there were three classes as well, but the names were changed to Class AAA (big schools), Class AA (medium-sized schools) and Class A (small schools). From 2024, the terms AAAA, AAA, AA, and A are used, with AAAA being the highest classification.

== WV champions by popular acclaim ==
=== Single class ===
Year	Champion
1903	Fairmont Senior (8-0-0)
1907	Fairmont Senior (2) (6-3-0)
1908	Wheeling
1909	Huntington (5-1-0)
1912	Huntington (2) (5-3-0)
1913	Wheeling (2)
1915	Buckhannon (8-0-0)
1916	Wheeling (3) (8-0-1)
1917	Huntington (3) (5-0-0)
1918	Parkersburg (2-1-0)
1918	Buckhannon (2) (4-0-0)
1919	Parkersburg (2) (7-1-0)
1920	Charleston (8-0-1)
1921	Parkersburg (3) (9-0-0)
1922	Charleston (2) (9-1-2)
1922	Parkersburg (4) (9-2-0)
1922	Clarksburg Washington Irving (8-1-0)
1922	St. Marys (9-1-0)
1922	Wheeling (4) (5-2-1)
1922	Huntington (4) (4-4-1)
1922	Mannington (9-0-0)
1923	Huntington (5) (9-2-0)
1924	Buckhannon (3) (8-0-0)
1924	Fairmont Senior (3) (8-0-1)
1924	Charleston (3) (11-1-1)
1925	Clarksburg-Victory (8-0-0)
1925	Wheeling (5) (8-1-1)
1926	Benwood Union (8-1-0)
1926	Williamson (11-0-0)
1926	Magnolia (9-0-0)
1926	Clarksburg Washington Irving (2) (8-0-1)
1927	Morgantown (9-0-0)
1927	Parkersburg (5) (10-0-0)
1928	Benwood Union (2) (8-0-0)
1928	Elkins (9-0-0)
1928	Huntington (6) (10-0-2)
1929	Fairmont Senior (4) (8-0-0)
1929	Clarksburg Roosevelt-Wilson (8-0-0)
1930	Huntington (7) (7-3-1)
1931	Benwood Union (3)
1932	Big Creek (9-0-0)
1933	Charleston (4) (13-1-0)
1933	Doddridge (9-0-0)
1934	Huntington (8) (10-0-0)
1934	Big Creek (2) (9-0-0)
1935	Weir (10-0-0)
1935	Clarksburg-Victory (2) (9-0-0)
1936	Doddridge (10-0-0)

== WV Colored State Football Champions ==
Not that many years ago, African-American students were barred from playing football with White Americans. This changed in 1954 with the Supreme Court decision Brown vs. Board of Education which overturned school segregation. Black schools were governed by the WV Athletic Union, but did not receive as consistent media attention as their white counterparts. This makes research difficult.

=== Single class ===
Year	Champion
1916	
1917	Sumner
1918	
1919	
1920	Frederick Douglass
1921	Frederick Douglass (2) & Sumner (2) (tie)
1922	Frederick Douglass (3)
1923	Garnet
1924	
1925	
1926	Booker T. Washington
1927	Kelly Miller
1928	Kelly Miller (2)
1929	Kelly Miller (3)
1930	Garnet (2) (6-0-0)
1931	Fairmont-Dunbar
1932	Gary District
1933	Garnet (3) (7-0-0)
1934	Fairmont-Dunbar (2) (8-0-0)
1935	Excelsior
1936	DuBois
1937	Frederick Douglass (4)
1938	DuBois (2)
1939	DuBois (3)
1940	Monongalia
1941	Stratton (8-0-2)
1942	DuBois (4)
1943	Fairmont-Dunbar (3)
1944	Elkhorn
1945	Excelsior (2)
1946	Stratton (2) (10-0-0)
1947	Frederick Douglass (5)
1948	Aracoma
1949	Aracoma (2)
1950	Garnet (4) (9-1-0)
1951	Conley
1952	Kimball
1953	Fairmont-Dunbar (4)
1954	Stratton (3) (9-0-0)
1955	Byrd Prillerman
1956	Gary District (2)

== WV Catholic Schools State Football Champions ==
Prior to 1977, private schools were not allowed to compete in post-season play-offs.

=== Single class ===
Year	Champion	Score	Runner-up
1962	Charleston Catholic	13-7	Wheeling Central
1963	Wheeling Central	40-6	Charleston Catholic
1964	Wheeling Central (2)	28-20	Charleston Catholic
1965	Wheeling Central (3)		No game played
1966	Wheeling Central (4)	46-6	Weirton-Madonna
1967	Wheeling Central (5)		No game played
1968	Weirton-Madonna		No game played
1969	Charleston Catholic (2)	12-7	Parkersburg Catholic
1970	Parkersburg Catholic	21-0	Clarksburg-Notre Dame
1971	Weirton-Madonna (2)	44-6	Bishop Donahue
1972	Weirton-Madonna (3)	22-6	Charleston Catholic
1973	Charleston Catholic (3)	27-6	Weirton-Madonna
1974	Clarksburg-Notre Dame	20-16	Weirton-Madonna
1975	Weirton-Madonna (4)	39-13	Clarksburg-Notre Dame
1976	Charleston Catholic (4)	6-0	Morgantown-St. Francis

== WV Sportswriters vote ==
=== Single class ===
Year	Champion
1937	Hinton
1938	Parkersburg (6)
1939	Charleston (5)
1940	Parkersburg (7)
1941	Mullens
1942	Weir (2)
1943	Parkersburg (8)
1944	Williamson
1945	South Charleston
1946	Fairmont Senior (5)

== Two class system (A, B) 1947–1954 / WVSSAC ratings ==
=== Class A (two classes A, B, 1947–1954) ===
Year	Champion	Score	Runner-up
1947	Woodrow Wilson and Stonewall Jackson	tie	No game played
1948	Woodrow Wilson (2)		No game played
1949	Weir (3)	37–13	Milton
1950	Parkersburg (9)	40–0	Oak Hill
1951	Woodrow Wilson (3)	26–0	Gary
1952	Grafton	6–0	Big Creek
1953	Barboursville	27–0	Benwood Union
1954	Follansbee	7–0	Barboursville

=== Class B (two classes A, B, 1947–1954) ===
Year	Champion	Score	Runner-up
1947	Webster Springs		No game played
1948	Vinson	25–6	Alderson
1949	Romney	20–19	Wirt County
1950	Poca and Vinson	tie	No game
1951	Vinson (2)	26–7	Sissonville
1952	Monongah	20–14	Winfield
1953	Sistersville	26–13	Romney
1954	Farmington	39–13	Rupert

== Three class system (AA, A, B) 1955–1957 / WVSSAC ratings ==
=== Class AA (three classes AA, A, B, 1955–1957) ===
Year	Champion	Score	Runner-up
1955	St. Albans		No game played
1956	Grafton		No game played
1957	Weir (4)	19-12	Fairmont Senior

=== Class A (three classes AA, A, B, 1955–1957) ===
Year	Champion	Score	Runner-up
1955	Bridgeport	39-13	Webster Springs
1956	Keyser	12-0	Mullens
1957	Vinson	14-13	Keyser

=== Class B (three classes AA, A, B, 1955–1957) ===
Year	Champion	Score	Runner-up
1955	Monongah (2)	14–13	Wirt County
1956	Vinson (3)	19–7	Monongah
1957	Ravenswood	34–13	Rupert

== Three class system (AAA, AA, A) 1958–present / WVSSAC ratings ==
=== Class A (three classes AAA, AA, A, 1958–present) ===
1958	Meadow Bridge	6–0	Winfield
1959	Ravenswood	15–13	Winfield
1960	Winfield	20–13	Alderson
1961	Winfield (2)	19–13	Williamstown
1962	Rainelle	32–7	Sophia
1963	Winfield (3)	26–13	Northfork
1964	Sistersville	27–0	Fairview
1965	Crum	20–18	Masontown Valley
1966	Wirt County	27–6	Crum
1967	Marlinton	26–0	Wirt County
1968	Monongah	20–12	Paden City
1969	Monongah (2)	26–0	Paden City
1970	Paden City	20–6	Wirt County
1971	Ansted	20–14	Fairview
1972	Ansted (2)	8–7	Monongah
1973	Monongah (3)	21–20	South Harrison
1974	Musselman	8–0	Hamlin
1975	Ridgeley	20–13	Wirt County
1976	Mannington	28–6	Gauley Bridge
1977	Mannington (2)	28–20	Pineville
1978	Duval	27–14	Doddridge County
1979	Paden City	19–6	Bishop Donahue
1980	Sistersville (2)	28–0	Clarksburg-Notre Dame
1981	Sistersville (3)	28–3	Peterstown
1982	Duval (2)	28–15	Sistersville
1983	Tyler County	16–14	Sistersville
1984	Sistersville (4)	42–11	Fayetteville
1985	Sistersville (5)	22–13	Morgantown-St. Francis
1986	Sistersville (6)	14–0	Tyler County
1987	Weirton-Madonna (5)	22–8	Matewan
1988	Meadow Bridge (2)	7–6	Pineville
1989	Mount Hope (3)	32–8	Peterstown
1990	Duval (3)	37–20	Peterstown
1991	Peterstown	26–21	Matewan
1992	Fayetteville	15–9	Matewan
1993	Matewan	21–13	Valley Wetzel
1994	Ceredo-Kenova (11)	44–0	Valley Wetzel
1995	Gilbert	28–20	Valley Wetzel
1996	Moorefield	16–14	Valley Wetzel
1997	Moorefield (2)	13–9	Big Creek
1998	Moorefield (3)	29–9	Valley Wetzel
1999	Moorefield (4)	29–13	Fayetteville
2000	Wheeling Central (7)	34–6	Moorefield
2001	Moorefield (5)	13–0	Wheeling Central
2002	Wheeling Central (8)	14–7 (OT)	Moorefield
2003	Moorefield (6)	20–18	Williamstown
2004	Wheeling Central (9)	34–7	Weirton-Madonna
2005	Wheeling Central (10)	35–20	Williamstown
2006	Wheeling Central (11)	14–7	Williamstown
2007	Wheeling Central (12)	51–14	Williamstown
2008	Williamstown	23–7	Weirton-Madonna
2009	Weirton-Madonna (6)	27–7	Man
2010	Wheeling Central (13)	28–14	Wahama
2011	Wheeling Central (14)	35–21	Williamstown
2012	Wahama	43–42 (OT)	Weirton-Madonna
2013	Weirton-Madonna (7)	24-14	Greenbrier West
2014	Williamstown (2)	33-32 (3OT)	St. Marys
2015	Magnolia (3)	62-0	East Hardy
2016	St. Marys (2)	23-8	East Hardy
2017	Wheeling Central (15)	40-21	St. Marys
2018	Wheeling Central (16)	44-15	Williamstown
2019	Wheeling Central (17)	38-21	Doddridge County
2020	St. Marys (3)	Forfeited due to COVID	Ritchie County
2021	Ritchie County	42-21	Williamstown
2022	Williamstown (4)	52-20	James Monroe
2023	Williamstown (5)	42-12	Greenbrier West

=== Class AA (three classes AAA, AA, A, 1958–present) ===
Year	Champion	Score	Runner-up
1958	Roosevelt Wilson	19–12	Sissonville
1959	Mount Hope and Mullens	0–0	Co-champions
1960	Mount Hope (2) and Williamson	7–7	Co-champions
1961	Williamson	20-13	Mt. Hope
1962	Keyser	35–20	Nicholas County
1963	Ceredo-Kenova	19–13	Hinton
1964	Magnolia	15–7	Mount Hope
1965	Ceredo-Kenova (2)	26–6	Mount Hope
1966	Gary	33–14	Ceredo-Kenova
1967	Ceredo-Kenova (3)	47–13	Monongah
1968	Hinton	9–0	Oceana
1969	Keyser (2)	21–20	Winfield
1970	Gary	33–14	Oceana
1971	Ceredo-Kenova (4)	14–8	Oceana
1972	Ravenswood	14–6	Magnolia
1973	Northfork	14–13	Ceredo-Kenova
1974	Ceredo-Kenova (5)	34–14	Northfork
1975	Ceredo-Kenova (6)	18–6	Sherman
1976	Ravenswood (2)	15–7	Big Creek
1977	Poca	20–6	Man
1978	Ceredo-Kenova (7)	21–6	Poca
1979	Wheeling Central (6)	39–21	Buffalo Wayne
1980	Ceredo-Kenova (8)	18–13	Man
1981	Ceredo-Kenova (9)	22–15	Magnolia
1982	Musselman	12–7	Ceredo-Kenova
1983	Ceredo-Kenova (10)	34–15	Musselman
1984	Grafton (2)	14–10	Man
1985	Winfield	28–6	Buffalo Wayne
1986	Bridgeport	10–7	Tucker County
1987	Winfield (2)	48–14	Tucker County
1988	Bridgeport (2)	29–28 (4OT)	Winfield
1989	East Bank	14–9	Musselman
1990	East Bank (2)	15–12	Spencer
1991	Spencer	31–22	Greenbrier West
1992	Buffalo Wayne	7–3	Magnolia
1993	East Bank (3)	16–14	Magnolia
1994	Poca (2)	19–0	Sissonville
1995	Musselman (2)	19–0	Bluefield
1996	East Bank (4)	20–14	Poca
1997	Bluefield (7)	42–13	Grafton
1998	Weir (5)	20–17	DuPont
1999	Wyoming East	57–21	Bluefield
2000	Bridgeport (3)	14–6	Wayne
2001	Poca (3)	21–7	Bridgeport
2002	Poca (4)	27–7	Bluefield
2003	Poca (5)	21-20 (1OT)	Bluefield
2004	Bluefield (8)	69–24	Wayne
2005	Weir (6)	40–0	Bluefield
2006	Wayne	33–6	Tolsia
2007	Bluefield (9)	20-12	James Monroe
2008	Grafton (3)	56–25	Magnolia
2009	Bluefield (10)	27–7	Wayne
2010	Magnolia (2)	28–13	Ravenswood
2011	Wayne (2)	34–7	Point Pleasant
2012	Wayne (3)	35–0	Keyser
2013	Bridgeport (4)	14–13	Wayne
2014	Bridgeport (5)	43–7	Frankfort
2015	Bridgeport (6)	39-0	Tolsia
2016	Mingo Central	32-7	Fairmont Senior
2017	Bluefield (11)	29-26	Fairmont Senior
2018	Fairmont Senior (6)	23-13	Bluefield
2019	Bridgeport (7)	21-14	Bluefield
2020	Fairmont Senior (7)	Forfeited due to COVID	N/A
2021	Fairmont Senior (8)	21-12	Independence
2022	Independence	42-7	Herbert Hoover
2023	Fairmont Senior (9)	49-48	North Marion

== Schools with multiple championships ==
59 schools have won multiple football championships, 30 of which have since been consolidated. Parkersburg High School and Wheeling Central Catholic High School are tied with the most titles, with 16.

Titles	School	Years
17	Wheeling Central	1963, 1964, 1965, 1966, 1967, 1979 (2A), 2000 (1A), 2002 (1A), 2004 (1A), 2005 (1A), 2006 (1A), 2007 (1A), 2010 (1A), 2011 (1A), 2017 (1A), 2018 (1A) 2019 (1A)
16	Parkersburg	1918, 1919, 1921, 1922, 1927, 1938, 1940, 1943, 1950 (1A), 1958 (3A), 1976 (3A), 1978 (3A), 1999 (3A), 2001 (3A), 2006 (3A), 2007 (3A)
11	Ceredo-Kenova	1963 (2A), 1965 (2A), 1967 (2A), 1971 (2A), 1974 (2A), 1975 (2A), 1978 (2A), 1980 (2A), 1981 (2A), 1983 (2A), 1994 (1A)
11	Bluefield	1959 (3A), 1962 (3A), 1965 (3A), 1967 (3A), 1975 (3A), 1984 (3A), 1997 (2A), 2004 (2A), 2007 (2A), 2009 (2A), 2017 (2A)
10	Bridgeport	1955 (1A), 1972 (3A), 1979 (3A), 1986 (2A), 1988 (2A), 2000 (2A), 2013 (2A), 2014 (2A), 2015 (2A), 2019 (2A)
9	Charleston	1920, 1922, 1924, 1933, 1939, 1968 (3A), 1969 (3A), 1970 (3A), 1988, (3A)
8	Huntington	1909, 1912, 1917, 1922, 1923, 1928, 1930, 1934
8	Martinsburg	2010 (3A), 2011 (3A), 2012 (3A), 2013 (3A), 2016 (3A), 2017 (3A), 2018 (3A), 2019 (3A)
8	Weir	1935, 1942, 1949 (1A), 1957 (2A), 1960 (3A), 1961 (3A), 1998 (2A), 2005 (2A)
7	East Bank	1964 (3A), 1971 (3A), 1973 (3A), 1989 (2A), 1990 (2A), 1993 (2A), 1996 (2A)
7	Weirton-Madonna	1968, 1971, 1972, 1975, 1987 (1A), 2009 (1A), 2013 (1A)
6	Moorefield	1996 (1A), 1997 (1A), 1998 (1A), 1999 (1A), 2001 (1A), 2003 (1A)
6	Poca	1950 (B), 1977 (2A), 1994 (2A), 2001 (2A), 2002 (2A), 2003 (2A)
6	Sistersville	1964 (1A), 1980 (1A), 1981 (1A), 1984 (1A), 1985 (1A), 1986 (1A)
6	Fairmont Senior	1903, 1907, 1924, 1929, 1946, 2018 (2A)
6	Morgantown	1927, 1983 (3A), 2000 (3A), 2002 (3A), 2004 (3A), 2005 (3A)
5	Monongah	1952 (B), 1955 (B), 1968 (1A), 1969 (1A), 1973 (1A)
5	Winfield	1960 (1A), 1961 (1A), 1963 (1A), 1985 (2A), 1987 (2A)
5	Frederick Douglass	1920, 1921, 1922, 1937, 1947
5	Buckhannon High/ Buckhannon-Upshur High School	1915, 1918, 1924, 1963 (3A), 1966 (3A)
5	Wheeling	1908, 1913, 1916, 1922, 1925
4	Capital	1989 (3A), 1991 (3A), 1995 (3A), 2014 (3A)
4	Garnet	1923, 1930, 1933, 1950
4	Ravenswood	1957 (B), 1959 (1A), 1972 (2A), 1976 (2A)
4	Fairmont-Dunbar	1931, 1934, 1943, 1953
4	South Charleston	1945, 1994 (3A), 2008 (3A), 2009 (3A)
4	Grafton	1952 (1A), 1956 (2A), 1984 (2A), 2008 (2A)
4	DuBois	1936, 1938, 1939, 1942
4	Williamson	1926, 1944, 1960 (2A), 1961 (2A)
4	Charleston Catholic	1962, 1969, 1973, 1976
4	Magnolia	1926, 1964 (2A), 2010 (2A), 2015 (1A)
3	Brooke	1985 (3A), 1987 (3A), 1990 (3A)
3	Duval	1978 (1A), 1982 (1A), 1990 (1A)
3	Benwood Union	1926, 1928, 1931
3	Kelly Miller	1927, 1928, 1929
3	Stratton	1941, 1946, 1954
3	Keyser	1956 (1A), 1962 (2A), 1969 (2A)
3	Mount Hope	1959 (2A), 1960 (2A), 1989 (1A)
3	Musselman	1974 (1A), 1982 (2A), 1995 (2A)
3	North Marion	1980 (3A), 1981 (3A), 1997 (3A)
3	Vinson	1950 (B), 1951 (B), 1956 (B)
3	Wayne	2006 (2A), 2011 (2A), 2012 (2A)
3	Woodrow Wilson	1947 (1A), 1948 (1A), 1951 (1A)
3	Mannington	1922, 1976 (1A), 1977 (1A)
2	DuPont	1992 (3A), 1993 (3A)
2	Meadow Bridge	1958 (1A), 1988 (1A)
2	Stonewall Jackson	1974 (3A), 1986 (3A)
2	Williamstown	2008 (1A), 2014 (1A)
2	Sumner	1917, 1921
2	Clarksburg-Washington Irving	1922, 1926
2	Gary District	1932, 1956
2	Excelsior	1935, 1945
2	Aracoma	1948, 1949
2	Clarksburg-Victory	1925, 1935
2	Clarksburg-Roosevelt-Wilson	1929, 1958 (2A)
2	Big Creek	1932, 1934
2	St. Marys	1922, 2016 (1A)
2	Doddridge	1933, 1936

- WVSSAC State Football Champions

== See also ==
- West Virginia Secondary School Activities Commission
