= Gene Trosch =

American football player (born 1945)

No. 74, 83
- Position: Defensive end

Personal information
- Born: June 7, 1945; Steubenville, Ohio, U.S.
- Died: September 7, 2010 (aged 65); McCalla, Alabama, U.S.
- Listed height: 6 ft 7 in (2.01 m)
- Listed weight: 277 lb (126 kg)

Career information
- High school: Madonna (Weirton, West Virginia)
- College: Miami (FL) (1963–1966)
- NFL draft: 1967: 1st round, 24th overall pick

Career history
- Kansas City Chiefs (1967–1969); New Orleans Saints (1971)*; Cincinnati Bengals (1971)*; Detroit Wheels (1974)
- * Offseason or practice squad member only

Awards and highlights
- Super Bowl champion (IV); AFL champion (1969)

Career AFL statistics
- Sacks: 1
- Stats at Pro Football Reference

Eugene Lloyd Trosch (June 7, 1945 – September 7, 2010) was an American professional football player who was a defensive lineman for the Kansas City Chiefs of the American Football League (AFL). He played collegiately for the Miami Hurricanes. Trosch was on the Chiefs' roster for two seasons in 1967 and 1969 but according to records, did not play in 27 games. Trosch attended Madonna High School in Weirton, West Virginia.

Trosch was on the 1969 Chiefs' team that won the fourth and final AFL-NFL World Championship game.

== See also ==
- Other American Football League players
