= Wirt County Schools =

School district in West Virginia, US

Wirt County Schools is the operating school district within Wirt County, West Virginia. It is governed by the Wirt County Board of Education.

== Schools ==
=== High schools ===
- Wirt County High School

=== Middle schools ===
- Wirt County Middle School

=== Elementary schools ===
- Wirt County Primary Center
