= University of Charleston Stadium at Laidley Field =

Stadium in Charleston, West Virginia

Coordinates: 38.344048°N 81.615158°W

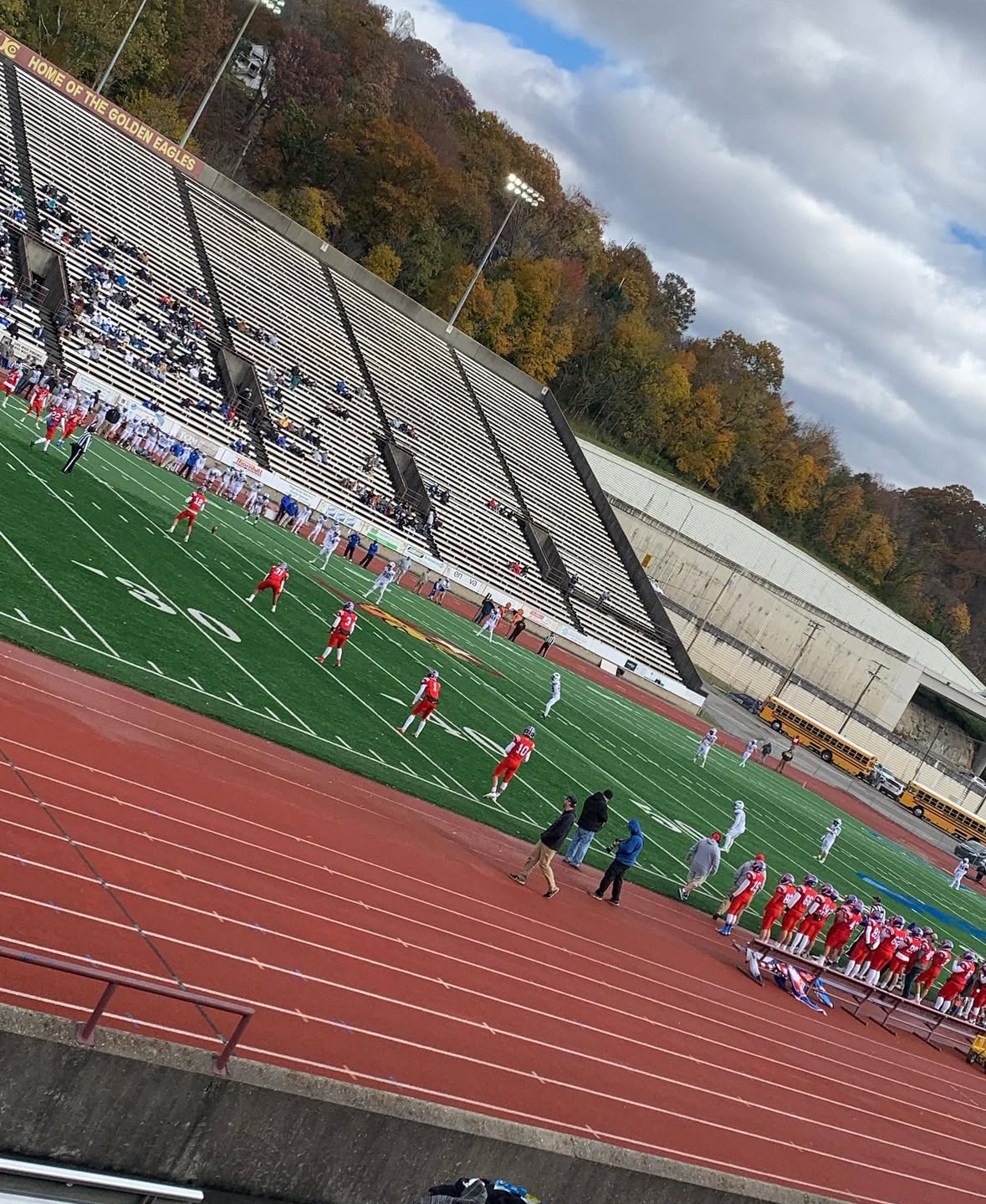
- UC Stadium at Laidley Field
- Interactive map of University of Charleston Stadium at Laidley Field
- Full name: University of Charleston Stadium at Laidley Field
- Former names: Laidley Field (1918–2003)
- Location: 1549 Piedmont Road Charleston, West Virginia
- Elevation: 597 ft (182 m)
- Owner: University of Charleston; Kanawha County Schools
- Capacity: 18,500 (1979–present): 13,000 – (1918–1923); 14,000 – (1924–1978)
- Event: Football
- Surface: Artificial Turf

Construction
- Built: 1918
- Renovated: 1977–78; 2003 (US$1.5 million); 2024 (US$2.8 million)
- Expanded: 1924, 1979

Tenants
- Charleston Golden Eagles (NCAA) (2003–present); WVSSAC Football Championships (1979–1987, 1989–1993, 2024–present)

Website
- UC Stadium

The University of Charleston Stadium at Laidley Field is an 18,500-capacity stadium located in downtown Charleston, West Virginia, near the West Virginia State Capitol complex. It features a FieldTurf playing field for football and facilities for track and field competitions.

== History ==
During a 1923 game between West Virginia and Washington and Lee, the wooden grandstands collapsed, injuring approximately 60 spectators. Local police and ambulances responded promptly, and the game was soon resumed.

The stadium finished renovations in 1979, as a complete rebuild of a previous facility. Originally the home field of Capital High School football after the consolidation Stonewall Jackson High School and Charleston High School. Multiple middle school and community teams also play at the location. It hosts the state high school track and field championships. The field has also played host to multiple high school playoff games as well as being host to the State Championships before their move to Wheeling in 1994. It also hosts the Gazette-Mail Kanawha County Majorette and Band Festival, an annual marching band festival held at the end of September.

Record attendance for this stadium was set at a local high school contest, Charleston High School vs. Stonewall Jackson High School in the latter part of the 1980s, later to be locally called "The Game" of the century. Record attendance was set at over 21,000. Later, when Capital High School and Riverside High School met when both were undefeated and ranked 1 and 2 in the state, there again were over 20,000 in attendance.

The WVSSAC announced on February 22, 2024 that Laidley Field would play host to the new 4 Class (Quad A) State Championship football games beginning in the 2024 season, hosting these games for the first time since 1993.

== University of Charleston ==
UC Stadium at Laidley Field is the home stadium of the Charleston Golden Eagles football team. In 2003, due to limited funding for maintenance, the Kanawha County School Board entered into a joint partnership with the University of Charleston to operate and manage the facility. UC invested over $1.5 million to replace the turf, add locker rooms and a skybox, and make other improvements in exchange for access and naming rights.

== Professional games ==
The first professional football game in West Virginia was played at Laidley Field on November 20, 1938, when the Pittsburgh Pirates (as the franchise was then known) faced the Philadelphia Eagles. Philadelphia won the contest, 14–7, before a crowd estimated at more than 6,500.

November 20, 1938 – Pittsburgh Pirates vs. Philadelphia Eagles

Team	Score
Pittsburgh Pirates	7
Philadelphia Eagles	14
