= Sherman High School (Seth, West Virginia) =

Public high school in Seth, West Virginia, United States

Location
- 10008 Coal River Road; Seth, West Virginia 25181; United States; 38°06′54″N 81°37′17″W

Information
- Type: Public high school
- Teaching staff: 23.00 (on an FTE basis)
- Grades: 9-12
- Enrollment: 331 (2023-24)
- Student to teacher ratio: 17.00
- Colors: Maroon; Gold

Sherman High School is the public high school serving Seth and part of southeastern Boone County in the state of West Virginia.

The school has 331 students by the count of the WVSSAC, placing it in class "A". The school colors are maroon and gold and the nickname is "Tide", which is expressed with nautical themes, despite the location of the school in the Appalachian Mountains.

The school was named for William Tecumseh Sherman, a United States Civil War general.
