= Doddridge County High School =

Location
- 79 Bulldog Drive; West Union, West Virginia 26456-1237; United States of America
- 39.2774°N 80.7845°W

Information
- School type: Public, high school
- Established: 1933
- Status: Open
- School district: Doddridge County Schools
- Superintendent: Dr. Adam Cheeseman
- Principal: David Mazza
- Teaching staff: 33.00 (FTE)
- Grades: 9–12
- Age range: 14–18
- Enrollment: 344 (2023-2024)
- Student to teacher ratio: 10.42
- Language: English
- Colors: Green and Gold
- Slogan: Now Is The Time: United To Make A Difference
- Athletics conference: Little Kanawha Conference
- Mascot: Bulldog
- Test average: C (2010)
- Feeder schools: Doddridge County Middle School
- Website: www.dcschools.us/o/dchs

Doddridge County High School is a public secondary school near West Union, West Virginia.

The school, which serves grades 9–12, is a part of Doddridge County Schools.

The school serves the entire county of Doddridge and was created in 1933 when the newly instituted county school system consolidated Carr High School and West Union High School.

The high school was originally located on Stuart Street in West Union. As of 2025, the building has been demolished.

A new high school, built on a site two miles west of West Union near U.S. Route 50, opened in 2008.

== Athletics ==
Doddridge County competes in team and individual competitions sanctioned by the West Virginia Secondary School Activities Commission and competes regionally in the Little Kanawha Conference

In 2019, construction of a $12.8 million ($16.5 million equivalent in 2025) athletic campus was completed.

=== State Championships ===
- Boys' Basketball: 1994
- Boys' Track & Field: 1994, 2006, 2009, 2011, 2012, 2013, 2014, 2015, 2019, 2021, 2022, 2025, 2026
- Boys' Cross-Country: 1994, 1995, 1997, 1998, 1999, 2017
- Football: 1936
- Girls' Basketball: 1985, 1987
- Girls' Cross-Country: 1996, 1998, 2003, 2006, 2016
- Girls' Track & Field: 1986, 1992, 1994, 2000, 2001, 2003, 2004, 2005, 2006, 2007, 2018, 2025
