= Seth, West Virginia =

- Unincorporated community
- Location within West Virginia Location within the United States
- Coordinates: 38°06′29″N 81°37′23″W
- Country: United States
- State: West Virginia
- County: Boone
- Elevation: 702 ft (214 m)
- Time zone: UTC-5 (Eastern (EST))
  - Summer (DST): UTC-4 (EDT)
- ZIP code: 25181
- Area codes: 304 & 681
- GNIS feature ID: 1546581

Seth is an unincorporated community and coal town in Boone County, West Virginia, United States. Seth is located on West Virginia Route 3, 11 miles (18 km) east-northeast of Madison. Seth has a post office with ZIP code 25181.

The community was named after Seth Foster, who was instrumental in securing a post office for the town. Prior to Seth, it was initially named Coon's Mills up to at least the Civil War period.
