= Notre Dame High School (Clarksburg, West Virginia) =

Location
- 127 East Pike Street; Clarksburg, (Harrison County), West Virginia 26301-2154; United States; 39°16′47″N 80°20′1″W

Information
- Type: Private, Coeducational
- Motto: To educate in faith, knowledge and service!
- Established: 1866
- Oversight: Diocese of Wheeling-Charleston
- Superintendent: Ms. Jennifer L. Hornyak
- Principal: Sister Maria Rukwishuro, SJI
- Grades: 7–12
- Enrollment: 151
- Average class size: 20
- Student to teacher ratio: 10:1
- Hours in school day: 6.5
- Colors: Green and Gold
- Slogan: Anima Sana in Corpore Sano
- Fight song: Notre Dame Victory March
- Athletics conference: Mason-Dixon
- Team name: Fighting Irish
- Rival: Robert C Byrd, Bridgeport
- Accreditation: North Central Association of Colleges and Schools
- Athletic Director: Claudine Oliverio
- Website: http://notredamewv.org

Notre Dame High School is a private, Roman Catholic high school in Clarksburg, West Virginia. It is part of the Roman Catholic Diocese of Wheeling-Charleston.

== Background ==
Notre Dame traces it roots to St. Joseph Academy, an all-girls school founded in 1866. St. Mary's opened in 1914 as a boys' preparatory school. In 1928, both schools consolidated. St. Mary's became a grade school in 1955 and Notre Dame High School opened its doors that same year.

== Academics ==
Notre Dame currently offers over 10 Advanced Placement courses.

== Athletics ==
Former West Virginia University player Jarrod West was the high school boys' basketball coach from 2004-2025.

Notre Dame competes in team and individual competitions sanctioned by the West Virginia Secondary School Activities Commission and competes regionally in the Mason-Dixon Conference.

=== Teams ===
- Cross Country
- Golf
- Soccer
- Cheerleading
- Volleyball
- Basketball
- Swimming
- Tennis
- Baseball
- Track and Field

==== State Championships ====
- Cheerleading: 1991
- Boys' Basketball: 2017

== Notable alumni ==
- Frank Loria, college football player at Virginia Tech
- Jarrod West II, professional basketball player
