= Princeton High School (West Virginia) =

Coordinates: 37°21′33.7″N 81°6′5.8″W

Princeton Senior High School

Location
- 1321 Stafford Drive; Princeton, West Virginia 24740

Information
- School type: Public, high school
- Motto: One Town, One School, One Family, PSHS
- School board: Mercer County Public Schools
- Superintendent: Edward Toman
- School number: 51507
- Principal: Thomas Adkins
- Staff: 55.00 (on an FTE basis)
- Grades: 9-12
- Enrollment: 967 (2023-2024)
- Student to teacher ratio: 17.58
- Language: English
- Campus: City
- Area: Princeton City
- Colors: Blue and white
- Mascot: Tiger
- Team name: Princeton Tigers
- Feeder schools: Princeton Middle School, Glenwood School
- Website: Princeton Senior High School

Princeton Senior High School is located in Princeton, West Virginia and is the largest high school in Mercer County. The school is located at 1321 Stafford Drive in Princeton.

== Demographics ==
As of the 2020–21 school year, the school had an enrollment of 908 students and 57.50 classroom teachers (on an FTE basis), for a student–teacher ratio of 15.79:1.

== Extracurricular activities and clubs ==
The organizations, clubs, and extracurricular activities of Princeton High School include focuses on student interests (such as art and music), fundraising and community service (such as Key Club), and other activities. The school also offers band, Center Stage, show choir, and Madrigal singer classes.

Clubs include Key Club, Interact Club, Art Club, Pep Club, National Honor Society, Model UN, Students Against Destructive Decisions, and Future Business Leaders of America.

== Sports ==
Princeton High School offers football, basketball, baseball, golf, tennis, track, cross-country, softball, volleyball, wrestling, and soccer among their sports programs. The 2012 baseball team won the state championship 7 to 4 against Nitro High School. The Tigers won the AAA Basketball titles in 1979 and 1981. The 2025 Football team won the AAA state championship against Nitro High School 36-35. (First in program history)

== Events ==
The school also changed its grading/ranking policy in an effort to align it with the rest of the state of West Virginia. This was also changed in an effort to promote fairness to students taking more challenging courses. AP courses are worth a 5.0, honors are now worth 4.5, and regular classes are worth a 4.0. As of 2009, there were seven Advanced Placement courses in the school: AP Biology, AP Chemistry, AP Calculus AB, AP English Language and Composition, AP English Literature, AP United States History, and AP Studio Art.

== Notable alumni ==
- Rod Thorn, former NBA player and current basketball executive
- Lee Patton, legendary Hall of Fame coach at PHS and West Virginia University.
- Ethan Howard, audio engineer
- Stephen Murphy, retired federal agent
