= South Harrison High School (West Virginia) =

Coordinates: 39°11′15″N 80°23′20″W

Location
- 3073 Hawk Highway; Lost Creek, Harrison County, West Virginia 26301; United States

Information
- School type: Public, high school
- Motto: Hail Hawks
- Founded: 1965 (consolidation)
- School district: Harrison County Schools
- Superintendent: Dora Stutler
- Principal: Ron Keener
- Teaching staff: 26.25 (FTE)
- Grades: 9-12
- Enrollment: 348 (2023–2024)
- Student to teacher ratio: 13.26
- Colors: Orange and black
- Mascot: Hawks
- Feeder schools: South Harrison Middle School
- Website: www.harcoboe.net/o/shhs

== General History ==
In 1965, Lost Creek High School and West Milford's Unidis High School were consolidated to create South Harrison High School. This new school was a grade 7-12 facility. In the summer of 1996, the Harrison County Board members officially separated South Harrison High School and South Harrison Middle School into two facilities. In 2006, the Harrison County Board voted and once again placed the high school and middle school under one administration. Again in 2010, the Harrison County Board members voted to once again split the High School and Middle School into two separate facilities. South Harrison High School is in Lost Creek, West Virginia. It has about 408 students among its 9th through 12th grades. SHHS's mascot is the Hawk. South Harrison belongs to the Harrison County and RESA VII school districts.

== Extracurriculars ==
South Harrison has several active sports teams, including: varsity football, varsity cheerleading, volleyball, boys' soccer, girls' soccer, varsity boys' basketball, junior varsity boys' basketball, girls' basketball, wrestling, swimming, softball, baseball, track and cross country. The school also has several active clubs in which a large faction of the student body participates. They include: National Honor Society, Christians in Action, Pep Club, Future Farmers of America, Future Business Leaders of America, and Student Council. These various organizations all participate in many activities throughout the school year. Further, the school routinely sends teams to various academic competitions, consisting of Math Field Day, Quiz Bowl, National Chemistry Olympiad, and Science Bowl.

Other portions of the school's extracurricular activities include the concert band, the marching band, and the award-winning show choir.

South Harrison has also partnered with West Virginia University, Fairmont State University, and Pierpont Community College to offer several dual-enrollment courses.

== Athletics ==
South Harrison competes in team and individual competitions sanctioned by the West Virginia Secondary School Activities Commission and competes regionally in the Little Kanawha Conference

=== State Championships ===
Softball: 2010
