= Ravenswood High School (West Virginia) =

Location
- 100 Plaza Drive; Ravenswood, West Virginia 26164; United States; 38.952044°N 81.760812°W

Information
- Type: Public secondary
- School district: Jackson County Schools (West Virginia)
- NCES School ID: 491-080
- Principal: William Heis
- Teaching staff: 27.60 (on an FTE basis)
- Grades: 9 – 12
- Enrollment: 397 (2024–2025)
- Student to teacher ratio: 14.38
- Colors: Red and black
- Athletics conference: Little Kanawha Conference
- Mascot: Red Devil
- Team name: Red Devils
- Newspaper: Ravenswood High School Informer
- Website: rhs.jack.k12.wv.us

Ravenswood High School is a public school in Ravenswood, West Virginia. It serves students in grades 9 through 12 and is operated by the Jackson County School District.

== Academics ==
Ravenswood offers Advanced Placement courses.

== Athletics ==
Ravenswood athletic teams are nicknamed the Red Devils and compete in the Little Kanawha Conference.

State Championships
Sport	Year(s)
Baseball	1999
Basketball (boys)	2006, 2009
Basketball (girls)	1982
Cross country (boys)	2000, 2001, 2002, 2003, 2004, 2005, 2006, 2007, 2008
Cross country (girls)	1990, 1992
Football	1957, 1959, 1972, 1976
Golf	2007, 2017
Track and field (girls)	1988, 1989, 1990, 1991, 1993

== Performing arts ==
RHS has a competitive show choir, "Rave Revue". The group won a West Virginia state championship in 2018 amidst a slew of contest wins.

== Incidents ==
In November 2023, Brent Jones, a chemistry teacher who taught at RHS, was arrested on charges of sexual conduct on a student. The school did not offer a statement.

== Notable alumni ==
- Paul Fletcher, professional baseball player
