= Wirt County High School =

Location
- 431 Mulberry Street; Elizabeth, West Virginia 26143; United States; 39.0632°N 81.3917°W

Information
- Established: 1915
- School district: Wirt County Schools
- Principal: Dottie Smith
- Staff: 24.40 (on an FTE basis)
- Grades: 9-12
- Enrollment: 262 (2018–19)
- Student to teacher ratio: 10.74
- Colors: Black and orange
- Nickname: Tigers
- Website: www.wirtcountyschools.com/o/wchs

Wirt County High School (WCHS) is a secondary school located in Elizabeth, West Virginia, United States, that serves grades nine through twelve. It is in Wirt County, West Virginia.

== History ==
=== Early years ===
During the early days of the pioneers, children were needed on their farms and “subscription schools” were throughout the county. These were formally taught terms where students would go to school and learn for four, six, eight, and ten week courses, as their farm work would allow. During this time families would take turns boarding the teachers in their homes.

In September 1915, fourteen students met in the fifth room of the Elizabeth Grade School with Mr. C.H. Snodgrass as principal. In 1919, the “high school” moved to the second floor of the Kanawha Motor Co. beside the Wirt County Courthouse. The first class graduated in the following spring of 1920.

In 1921, Elizabeth High School was completed and four year courses were offered. Elizabeth High School was a two-storey building, the first floor had two classrooms with a partition that could be removed for assemblies. The second floor had a classroom and a laboratory. It was designed to accommodate sixty students. In 1920, Elizabeth High School was also classified a first class high school by the State Department. The literary society, athletic association, and school paper were being offered in a limited role due to not having enough space to fully expand on these endeavours. At this point a call for a county high school began in earnest.

Originally, this county plan envisioned a dormitory, and accompanying farm where students could stay and work and live off their own production.

=== Construction ===
After several attempts, the high school became a county school, replacing its previous title of a joint-district school. A special levy was passed to build a new county high school soon after. Using county and federal aid, construction began in 1937 on a new building. Wirt County High School was completed and held its first classes in 1938. The new building contained 13 classrooms.

A gymnasium in 1948 at a cost of $44,500; a vocational wing in 1958 were added and the library was built on the current school grounds in 1962. Other additions to the school were made in 1977, 1980, and 1982.

==== Transportation ====
Parents and citizens were initially contracted to transport students to the high school by their own vehicles and in return receive a monthly stipend. In 1939, the Board of Education purchased its first bus. In the 1980s the fleet reached a height of 25 buses and routes. With consolidation, the current fleet stands at 13 route buses, and 5 reserve spares.

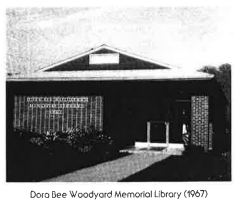
The Dora B. Woodyard Library in 1967.

=== Library ===
Dora B. Woodyard Library is located on the high school campus. The library is the only library in West Virginia that is both a high school and public library. Established in 1962 and expanded in 1980, this library was built as a memorial to the mother of Elizabeth native, Ronald B. Woodyard. During his lifetime Mr. Woodyard contributed substantial sums of money toward library as well as to other community projects. The library has the distinction of being one of the first cooperative school/public libraries in the state of West Virginia. The Wirt County Board of Trustees and the Wirt County Board of Education have established a unique bond over the which has allowed the library to fully serve the students

In 1962 a new library was constructed to combine the high school library, which was formerly in a classroom and the Sergeant Library located in the Board of Education Office. Mr. Ronald Woodyard made this possible when he donated $15,000 toward the building of a public library to be under the supervision of the Wirt County Board of Education. During the summer of 1980 construction began on addition more than doubled the space at the library and was to be used primarily by the public. The library was dedicated on October 14, 1980, by Senator Robert C. Byrd.

== Athletics ==
The sports available include volleyball, football, cheerleading, basketball, wrestling, softball, baseball, track and field, golf, and cross country.

=== State championships ===
| Sports | Year |
|---|---|
| Football | 1966 |
| Wrestling | 1968, 2017 |
| Volleyball | 2000, 2001, 2002, 2005, 2006, 2007, 2008, 2011, 2013, 2015, 2017, 2019, 2020, 2025, 2026 |
| Golf | 2002 |

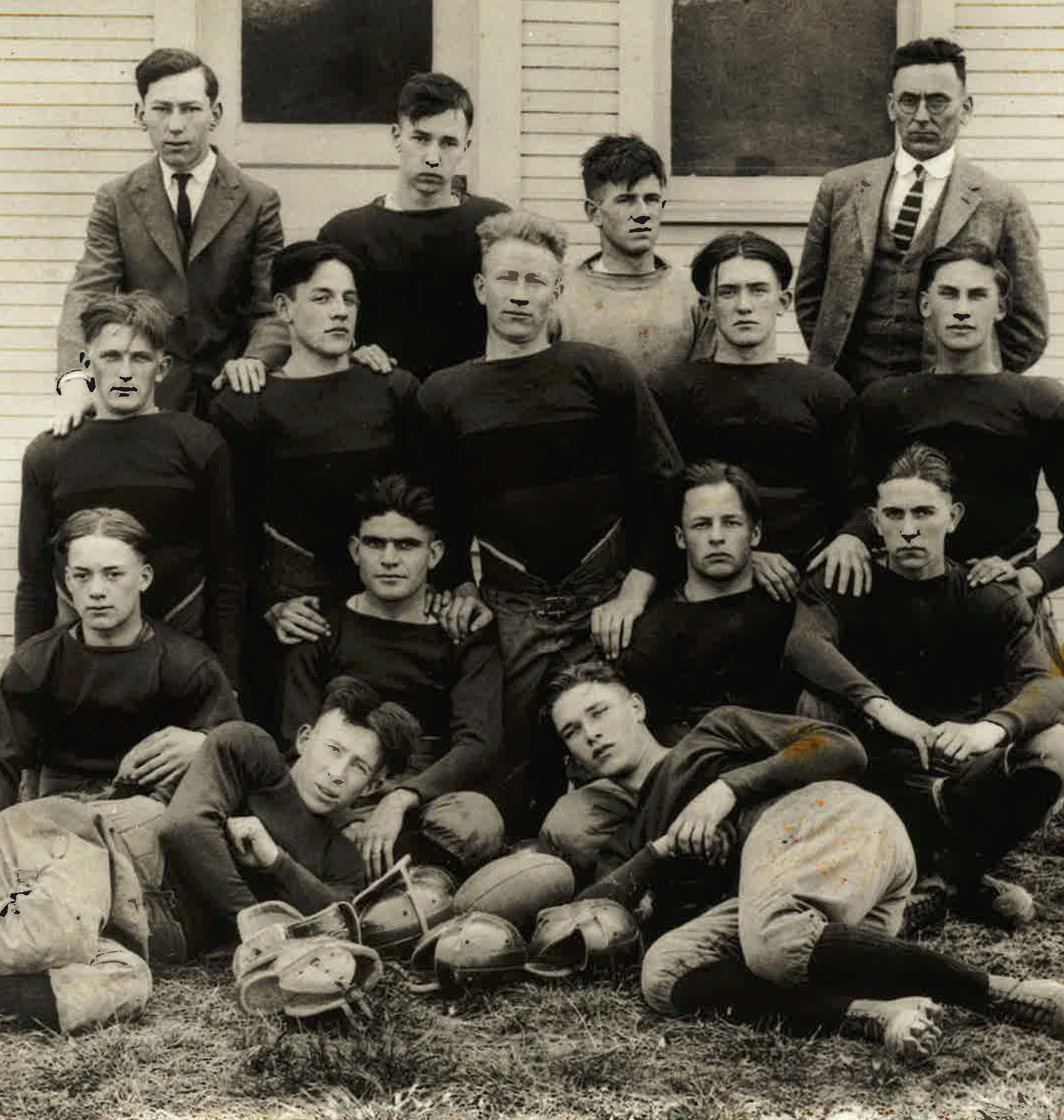
WCHS First Football Team

== Notable alumni ==
- Jessica Lynch, former United States Army soldier.

== Fine arts ==
Wirt County High School offers four different fine art classes: art, Film Studies, band, and choir.

=== Band ===
In 1925, there was a boys string band, which was directed by John Woodring. We didn’t have what we call a marching band today until 1935, which was directed by Joseph A. Childs. The band consisted of 40 members which would attend football games and parades for our home town, Elizabeth. Uniforms weren’t purchased until later in 1935. The number of students participating in the band has fluctuated since then, and the band has participated in more events.

=== Choir ===
The earliest documented year of Chorus is 1926. Chorus has been at Wirt County High School even before marching band. In the 1920s, Chorus consisted of between twenty and forty members. They have concerts in the springtime and in the Christmas parade.
