= Bishop Donahue Memorial High School =

Location
- 325 Logan Street; McMechen, (Marshall County), West Virginia 26040-1030; United States
- Coordinates: 39°59′33″N 80°43′51″W

Information
- Type: Private, coeducational
- Religious affiliations: Roman Catholic, Marist Brothers
- Established: 1955
- Closed: 2017
- Oversight: Diocese of Wheeling-Charleston
- Grades: 9–12
- Colors: Green and Gold
- Slogan: Enter to Learn Christ, Exit to Serve Christ
- Athletics conference: Ohio Valley Athletic Conference
- Team name: Bishops
- Rival: Wheeling Central Catholic High School
- Accreditation: North Central Association of Colleges and Schools
- Website: http://www.bishopdonahue.org

Bishop Donahue Memorial High School was a private, Roman Catholic high school in McMechen, West Virginia. It was part of the Roman Catholic Diocese of Wheeling-Charleston. It was named after Patrick James Donahue (1849–1922), who was the third Bishop of the Diocese of Wheeling from 1894 until his death in 1922.

At the end of the 2016-2017 school year, Bishop Donahue High School closed. It was opened for 62 school years (1955 - 2017) and graduated 59 classes (1959 - 2017).
