= Tyler Consolidated High School =

Location
- 1993 Silver Knight Drive; Sistersville, (Tyler County), West Virginia 26175; United States

Information
- School type: Public
- Founded: 1993
- School board: Tyler County Schools
- Superintendent: Shane Highley
- Principal: Paden Morris
- Grades: 9–12
- Enrollment: 368 (2024-2025)
- Colors: Silver, black, and blue
- Nickname: Silver Knights
- Website: Tyler Consolidated High School

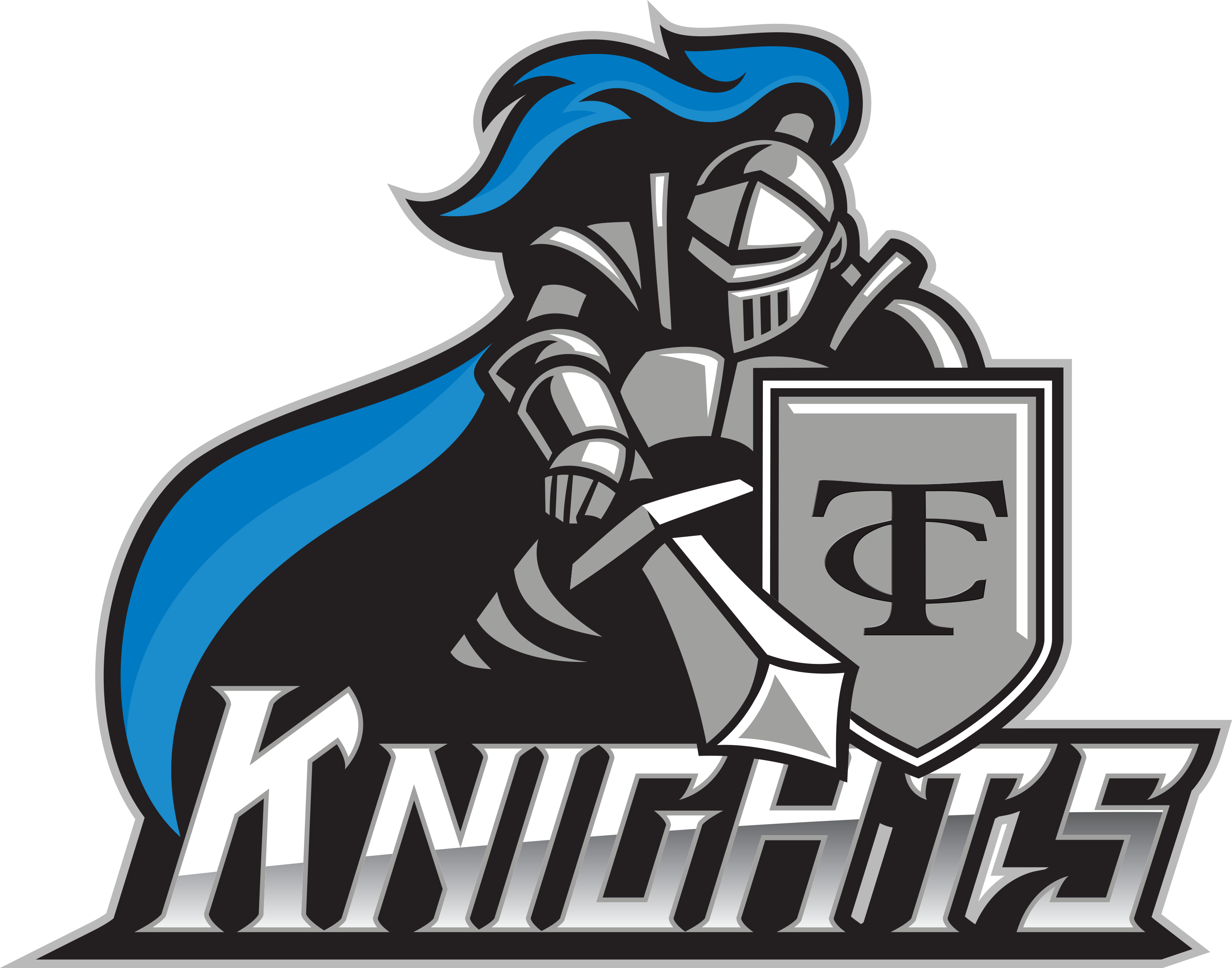
School logo

Tyler Consolidated High School (TCHS) is a public secondary school in Sistersville, West Virginia, United States. It is part of the Tyler County Schools district and is located at 1993 Silver Knight Drive. The school was formed in 1993 when students from Sistersville High School and Tyler County High School consolidated to form one county high school.

== Clubs and organizations ==
- National Honor Society
- National Art Honor Society
- Project Pediatrics
- Technology Student Association (TSA)
- Future Farmers of America (FFA)
- Future Business Leaders of America (FBLA)
- WRSG radio

== Traditions ==
- Spirit Week for Homecoming

== See also ==
- List of high schools in West Virginia
- Education in West Virginia
