= Herbert Hoover High School (West Virginia) =

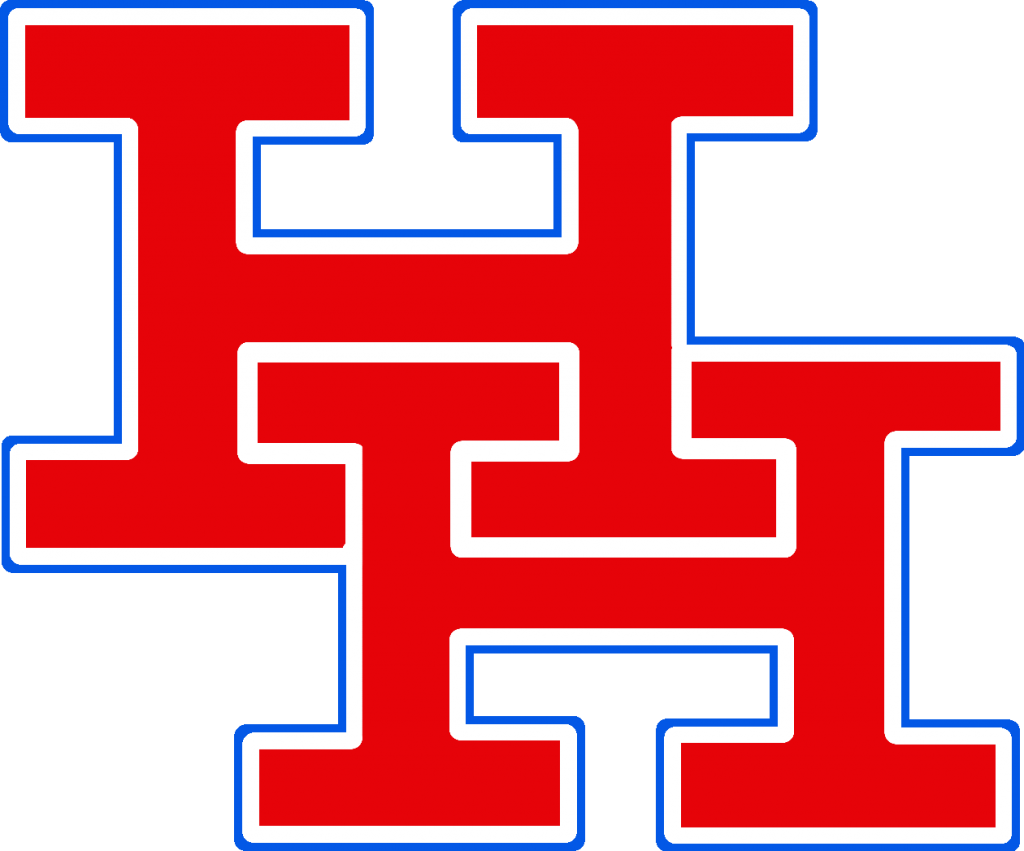

Location
- 775 Husky Way; Elkview, West Virginia 25071; United States

Information
- Type: Public high school
- Opened: 1963
- School district: Kanawha County Schools
- NCES School ID: 540060000403
- Principal: Mike Kelley
- Teaching staff: 40.00 (on an FTE basis)
- Grades: 9–12
- Enrollment: 783 (2023-2024)
- Student to teacher ratio: 19.58
- Colors: Scarlet and Royal blue
- Athletics conference: Cardinal Conference
- Nickname: Huskies
- USNWR ranking: 3,722
- Website: herberthoover.kana.k12.wv.us

Herbert Hoover High School (HHHS) is a public high school in Elkview, West Virginia, United States. It is part of the Kanawha County Schools district.

== History ==
Herbert Hoover High School first opened its doors in September 1963, following the consolidation of Clendenin High School and Elkview High School. The school began integrating 9th grade students during the 1992–1993 academic year.Historically, Herbert Hoover High School faced challenges with academic performance and was once considered among the lower-performing schools in West Virginia. In 2009, Mike Kelley was hired as the new principal, bringing a renewed focus on academic achievement and school culture. In recent years, the school has seen significant improvement, and as of 2022, it was ranked as the sixth-best overall high school in the state.

During the 2016 West Virginia flood, the school building was damaged beyond repair on June 23, 2016 when the Elk River put 7 feet of water into the school. On July 21, 2016 the Federal Emergency Management Agency (FEMA) declared the building a total loss and the Kanawha County School Board began expedited plans for a new building, however several delays prevented the advancement of the project, and the new facility is expected to be opened in August 2023. For the 2016–17 school year, students shared space, via a split schedule, with Elkview Middle School. This involved each group attending school for four-and-one-half hours per day with reading and homework assignments. A temporary campus of modified mobile home-type units known as "modulars" was constructed adjacent to the middle school, and a normal schedule was resumed for the 2017–18 school year. FEMA provided the modulars and will fund approximately 75 to 80% of the cost for the new building. The old, damaged building was demolished in September 2018.

Following the destruction of the original school building during the 2016 West Virginia flood, a new state-of-the-art campus was constructed. The new Herbert Hoover High School officially opened to students in August 2023.

== Athletics ==
As of 2025, Herbert Hoover High School competes in Class AAA of the WVSSAC.

Programs include:

- Archery
- Baseball
- Basketball
- Cheerleading
- Cross country
- Football
- Golf
- Soccer
- Softball
- Swim and dive
- Tennis
- Track and field
- Volleyball
- Wrestling

=== State championships ===
Sports State Championships
Sport	State Champion	Year	State Runner-Up	Year
Boys' Cross Country	0		1	1966
Girls' Cross Country	0		1	2025
Football	0		2	2022, 2024
Golf	1	2021	1	2007
Volleyball	1	2025	4	1996, 2013, 2024, 2026
Boys' Soccer	0		0	
Girls' Soccer	0		0	
Softball	6	2014, 2017, 2018, 2019, 2021, 2022	3	1997, 2005, 2023
Boys' Basketball	0		0	
Girls' Basketball	0		0	
Swimming	0		2	2025, 2026
Baseball	2	2007, 2013	1	2012
Tennis	0		0	
Boys' Track	0		0	
Girls' Track	0		1	2025
Wrestling	0		1	2025

=== Football ===
==== Playoff appearances ====
Herbert Hoover has made nineteen postseason appearances and reached the state championship game twice.

- 1977: AAA
- 1989: AAA
- 1992: AAA
- 1993: AAA
- 1994: AAA
- 1995: AAA
- 1996: AAA
- 2001: AAA
- 2002: AA
- 2005: AA
- 2009: AA
- 2010: AA
- 2015: AA
- 2020: AA
- 2021: AA
- 2022: AA (Class AA runner-up)
- 2023: AA
- 2024: AAA (Class AAA runner-up)
- 2025: AAA

=== Softball ===
- State Champions: 2014, 2017, 2018, 2019, 2021, 2022

=== Baseball ===
- State Champions: 2007, 2013

=== Volleyball ===
- State Champions: 2025

=== WVSSAC Champions Cup ===
School Year	Class	Boys Points	Boys Place	Girls Points	Girls Place
2023–24	AA	473.5	5th	474.5	5th
2024–25	AAA	482	7th	678.5	1st

== Notable alumni ==
- Corey Bird (Class of 2013), attended Marshall University, selected by the Miami Marlins in the 7th round of the 2016 MLB draft.
- Grant Buckner (Class of 2006), attended West Virginia University, selected by the Chicago White Sox in the 26th round of the 2011 MLB draft.
- Billy Joe Mantooth (Class of 1969), 1970 All-American at Ferrum College and later a player for the Philadelphia Eagles and Houston Oilers.
