= James Monroe High School (West Virginia) =

Location
- Rt. 1 Box 97-1-A; Lindside, West Virginia 24951; United States; 37.4834°N 80.6586°W

Information
- School type: public secondary
- School district: Monroe County Schools
- Superintendent: Joetta Basile
- CEEB code: 491015
- Principal: Debbie Sams
- Teaching staff: 20.00 (FTE)
- Grades: 9–12
- Gender: coed
- Enrollment: 460 (2024-2025)
- Student to teacher ratio: 23.00
- Campus type: rural
- Colors: purple black white
- Mascot: Mavericks
- Team name: Mavericks
- Website: jmhs.monroe.k12.wv.us

James Monroe High School is the only public high school in Monroe County, West Virginia. It has 461 students by the methods of the WVSSAC. The building is also home to the Monroe County Vocational Technical Center.

The school is located in Lindside, West Virginia. It was formed in 1994 by consolidation of the former Peterstown and Union high schools. It is named for James Monroe.

The school's teams are stylized "Mavericks" and is expressed with western themes. The school sponsors interscholastic teams for young men and women in basketball and soccer, for young men in baseball and football, and for young women in softball and volleyball. The school also sponsors 11 non-athletic student organizations.

== Athletics ==
James Monroe offers football, volleyball, boys' and girls' soccer, boys' and girls' basketball, baseball, and softball.

=== Football ===
State Championship Appearances

- JMHS Varsity Football lost in the WV State Championship to Bluefield in 2007, with a score of 20-12
- JMHS Varsity Football lost in the WV Class "A" State Championship to Williamstown in 2022, with a score of 52-20

=== Volleyball ===
State Championship Appearances

- In 2008, JMHS Varsity Volleyball came runner-up in the State Championship
- In 2014, JMHS Varsity Volleyball won the State Championship against Clay County
