= Moorefield High School =

High school in West Virginia, United States

Coordinates: 39°4′7.1″N 78°58′1.1″W

Location
- 401 North Main Street; Moorefield, (Hardy County), West Virginia 26836; United States

Information
- Type: Public high school
- School district: Hardy County Schools
- Principal: Amanda Campbell
- Staff: 28.50 (FTE)
- Grades: 9-12
- Enrollment: 492 (2023-24)
- Student to teacher ratio: 17.26
- Colors: Navy and gold
- Nickname: Yellow Jackets
- Website: Moorefield High School

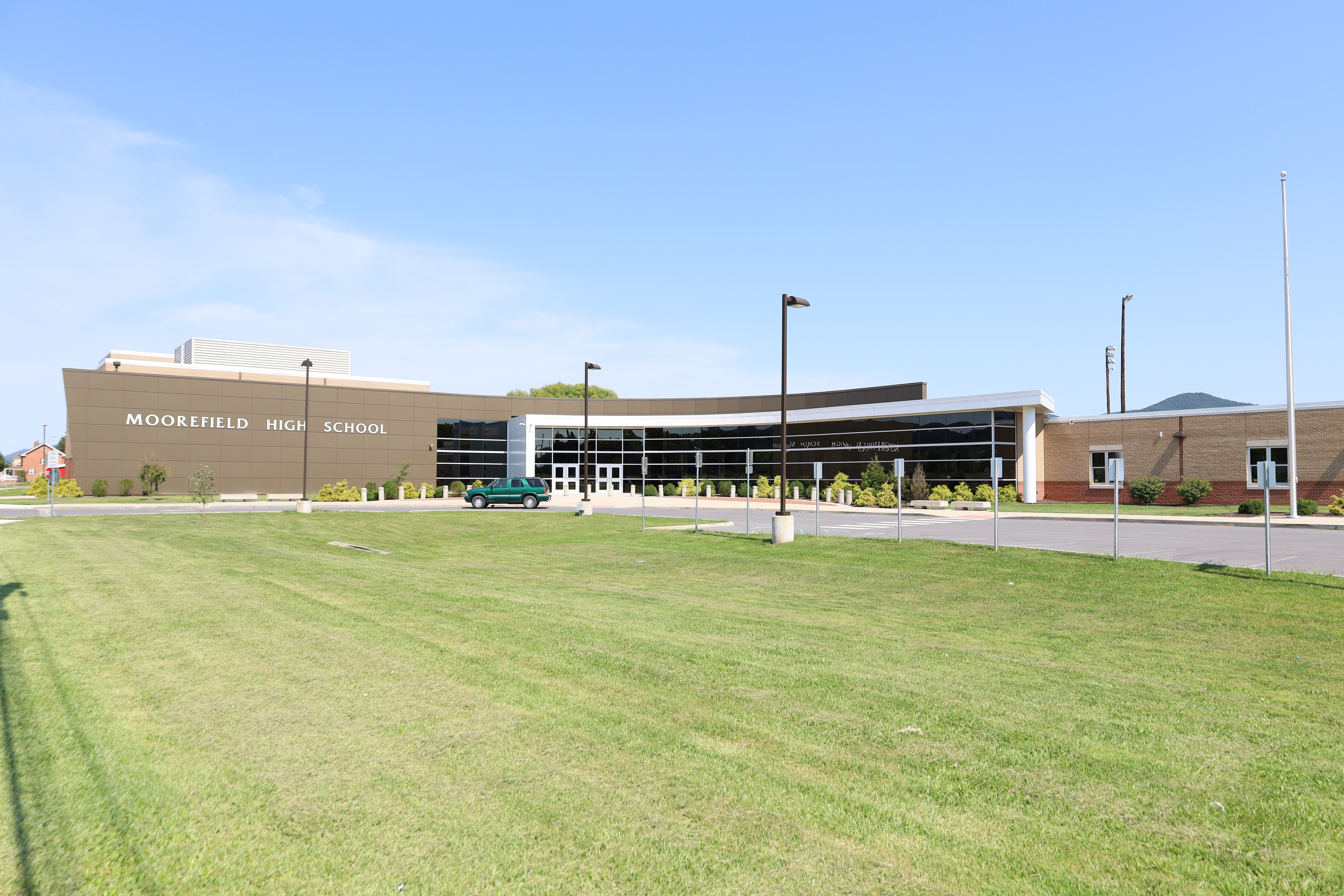
Moorefield High School in 2020

Moorefield High School is a high school located in Hardy County, West Virginia. It is one of two high schools located within Hardy County, the other being East Hardy High School. Moorefield High School was built in the late 1930s. Moorefield's colors are navy and old gold. Their mascot is the Yellowjackets, one among two schools in West Virginia to use this mascot (see Williamstown High School (WV)).

The building was renovated during 2013–2015. In 2013, the last part of the oldest portion of the school, dating from 1941, was demolished.

Moorefield high school have won 6 football championships, 2 in baseball, and 1 in basketball. Moorefield biggest sports rivalry is East Hardy High school.
