= Greenbrier West High School =

Location
- One Cavalier Drive; Charmco, West Virginia 25958; United States
- Coordinates: 38°0′11″N 80°43′59″W

Information
- Type: Public
- School district: Greenbrier County Schools
- Principal: Adam Young
- Teaching staff: 30.00 (FTE)
- Grades: 9-12
- Enrollment: 385 (2023–2024)
- Student to teacher ratio: 12.83
- Colors: Navy and Vegas gold
- Mascot: Cavaliers
- Website: gwhs.greenbriercountyschools.org

Greenbrier West High School is a public high school located in Charmco, West Virginia, United States. It serves 440 students in grades 9-12.

== Athletics ==
Greenbrier West participates in athletics under the nickname Cavaliers. It competes in class A of the West Virginia Secondary School Activities Commission.
