= Musselman High School =

- The crest of Musselman High School, created by Jostens.

Location
- 126 Excellence Way; Inwood, West Virginia 25428; United States
- 39.35188°N 78.04163°W

Information
- Type: Public 4-year
- Motto: Once an Appleman, Always an Appleman
- Established: 1949
- School district: Berkeley County Schools
- Superintendent: Patrick K. Murphy
- Principal: Alicia Riggleman
- Faculty: 103.5 (FTE)
- Grades: 9-12
- Enrollment: 1,780 (2023–2024)
- Student to teacher ratio: 17.2
- Colors: Kelly green, white, and red
- Mascot: Red Delicious Apple
- Nickname: Applemen
- Newspaper: The Cider Press
- Yearbook: The Echo
- Website: applemen.org

Musselman High School is a class AAAA high school in Inwood, West Virginia, United States. It was named after C.H. Musselman Company, an apple processing plant and maker of Musselman's Applesauce.

Their mascot is the Applemen, a Red Delicious apple with large, muscular arms and legs and an aggressive facial expression.

A new school building was built for the Musselman community in 1998 to replace the aging original structure and to address the increasing population.

== History ==
In 1949, the South Berkeley community realized that a new high school was necessary. Bunker Hill High School, the only high school in the south end of the county, had become overcrowded and substandard. The Berkeley County Board of Education could not afford such an endeavor at the time, so the thought was set aside. Years later, Mr. and Mrs. C.H. Musselman, owners and operators of the Musselman apple processing plant, saw the need and decided to share their wealth by providing the area with a new, modern structure. Mr. Musselman died before the building was completed. The original building was built largely by employees of the C.H. Musselman Company.

In order for the Musselman Foundation to make the gift to the community without special legislation, a special legal procedure was followed. First, the school board purchased the agreed upon site for the building. The site was then leased to the C.H. Musselman Foundation and the building was constructed. The lease was subsequently terminated and the key was handed over to the Berkeley County Board of Education once the structure was finished. The Board of Education named the school Musselman High School. Classes commenced before all details were completed due to the strong need for the facility.

In the first months of operation, the school had no chalkboards, lockers, pencil sharpeners, nor mascot. The building also lacked a gymnasium and an auditorium. Activities that exist today started the first year the school opened including marching band, football and basketball teams, and a school newspaper called The Cider Press. The marching band made its debut in the spring of 1950 at the Apple Blossom Festival in Winchester, Virginia. The first football team that same year consisted of eleven members and coach, Mr. Kenneth Waldeck. Mr. Waldeck nicknamed the team the "fighting eleven" after their first season brought only one tie and six losses. The Musselman High School football stadium is named for Mr. Waldeck. The original mascot chosen for Musselman High School was the "dragons" and the football team wore borrowed burgundy-colored uniforms from nearby Stonewall Jackson High School.

Fundraisers by the students and community helped to raise money for the chalkboards and other necessities. The school offered a contest in 1950 for students to choose the school colors and Macks Beasley was named the winner with his selection of kelly-green and white. In 1951, then coach and principal, Mr. Kenneth Waldeck, honored the Musselman family by using an apple theme for the school's mascot. He named the "Applemen" as the mascot and the color red was added to the school colors.

The Berkeley County Board of Education paid to construct a gymnasium on the south end of the building in 1955. Prior to the gyms construction, the Applemen had been holding their home games at Martinsburg High School. The auditorium came in 1979, thanks to the joint contributions of the Board of Education and the C.H. Musselman Foundation. By 1996, the original Musselman High School building had also become overcrowded and substandard and the South Berkeley community held an election and passed a bond that would help to build yet another new building.

The new high school was relocated on the opposite side of Rt.11 and opened in 1998. The old building is presently the site of the new Musselman Middle School. The original gymnasium and auditorium were kept and integrated into the middle school building plans. The new high school building encompassed a school store, two gymnasiums, a high-tech auditorium, greenhouses, a public library, and 63 classrooms. The building has since been renovated and expanded twice to handle the influx of residents to the area and increasing enrollment.

== Athletics ==
Musselman High School has athletic teams in basketball, baseball, cheerleading, cross country, football, golf, soccer, softball, swimming, tennis, track, wrestling, and volleyball. MHS teams compete in the AAA WV state classification, the classification for the largest schools in the state and are overseen by the West Virginia Secondary School Activities Commission (WVSSAC). The football team has won three WV state titles (1974, 1982, 1995) and twice finishing as runner-up (1983, 1989), all under coach Denny Price. Price is the all-time-winningest coach in the state of West Virginia, compiling 276 wins in his 40-year coaching career. He retired after the 2012 season.

The Musselman volleyball team achieved state champion titles in 2008 and 2010 During the 2010-2011 school year, the men's swim team and the softball team both captured a regional title.

The Musselman soccer team won the state championship in 2021

== Band program ==
The Musselman "Marching Applemen" band has won multiple competitions and competed at the national level, earning several honors including both 2nd and 4th place titles in the TOB Atlantic Coast Championships on four occasions, eleven Chapter Championships, and a 7th place title at the USBands national championships hosted by the Cadets The Cadets Drum and Bugle Corps.

== Feeder schools ==
Students entering Musselman High School come from both Musselman Middle School, located in Inwood, and Mountain Ridge Middle School, located in nearby Gerrardstown, West Virginia. Musselman Middle School eighth grade students are invited to participate in some of the freshman athletics and programs at Musselman High School.

== Notable alumni ==
- Trevon Wesco - tight end/fullback for the Chicago Bears of the NFL

== Other sources ==
- The Journal newspaper, "Remembering the Old, Less Snazzy Musselman-1949," September 1998
- The Mill Creek Peddler, "Musselman High School...A Gift," August 1998, Volume 3, no. 7
- Bunker Hill Historical Committee, "As Far As We Know...," Virginia, Commercial Press
- Musselman High School Yearbooks for 1950 to 1999
