= Clay-Battelle Middle/High School =

High school in West Virginia, United States

Coordinates: 39.71976°N 80.22321°W

Location
- 6266 Mason-Dixon Highway; Blacksville, (Monongalia County), West Virginia 26521; United States

Information
- Type: Public high school
- Principal: Mitch Channell
- Staff: 29.00 (FTE)
- Enrollment: 346 (2023-2024)
- Student to teacher ratio: 11.93
- Colors: Navy and gray
- Nickname: Cee Bees

Clay-Battelle Middle/High School is a secondary school (middle school and high school) in unincorporated Monongalia County, West Virginia, adjacent to Blacksville. It is operated by Monongalia County Schools.

Clay-Battelle Middle/High School, located just below the Mason–Dixon line, was formed from the consolidation of Blacksville, Wadestown, and Daybrook high schools in 1939. The building was constructed by the Public Works Administration. The school was designed by architects Tucker & Silling.

The school was named for the two districts in the western end of Monongalia County, and they, in turn, were named for the statesmen Henry Clay and Gordon Battelle.

Grey and blue were chosen as the school colors because of the school's proximity to the Mason–Dixon line. This line marked the significant separation of the North and South at the time of the Civil War.

On October 25, 2006, Clay-Battelle opened the new Commons, Administrative Offices, Kitchen, and 6 new classrooms. The new gymnasium and the new video conferencing center are scheduled to open in late December. The third and final stage of the building renovation, an auditorium, was scheduled to be finished before the end of 2007.
