= North Marion High School (West Virginia) =

Public coeducational school in Marion County, West Virginia, United States

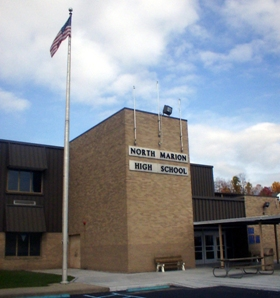

Location
- 1 North Marion Drive; Farmington, Marion County, West Virginia 26571; United States; 39°30′39″N 80°18′4″W

Information
- School type: Public coeducational
- Opened: September 1979; 46 years ago
- School district: Marion County
- Superintendent: Donna Hage
- Principal: Brad Harker
- Teaching staff: 42.00 (FTE)
- Grades: 9-12
- Age: 14 to 18
- Enrollment: 715 (2023–2024)
- Average class size: 25-30
- Student to teacher ratio: 17.02
- Campus type: Closed
- Colors: Black & silver
- Mascot: Husky
- Nickname: Rachel Rowdies
- Team name: 'Huskies'
- Yearbook: North Star
- Feeder schools: Mannington Middle School; Monongah Middle School; Barrackville Middle School; Fairview Middle School
- Website: www.marionboe.com/o/north-marion-hs
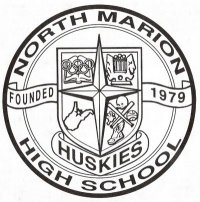

North Marion High School is a public high school in West Virginia, United States. It is one of three high schools in Marion County, alongside Fairmont Senior High School and East Fairmont High School.

North Marion High School was completed and opened in September 1979. The school is classified as "AA", and it has an enrollment of 851 students as of 2020.

== Athletics ==
State Championship History
Boys' Sports	State Titles	Girls' Sports	State Titles
Baseball		Softball	
Basketball	1999	Basketball	2009, 2010, 2011, 2018, 2023
Cross Country	1992, 1994, 1995, 2005	Cross Country	1993
Golf		Cheerleading	1982,1984,1988, 1990, 1994, 1995
Football	1980, 1981, 1997	Volleyball	
Soccer		Soccer	
Swimming		Swimming	
Tennis		Tennis	
Track & Field		Track & Field	2014
Wrestling	1998		
Boys' Total	9	Girls' Total	13

== In popular culture ==
The school is represented as "Grantville High School" in the popular alternative history novel 1632 by writer Eric Flint. The novel is set in the fictional town of Grantville, which is based on the real town and surroundings of Mannington.

== Notable alumni ==
- Rich Rodriguez, 1981 graduate: University football coach and Offensive Coordinator
- Natalie Tennant, 1985 graduate. Former Secretary of State of West Virginia.
