= Weirton Madonna High School =

Location
- 150 Michael Way; Weirton, (Hancock County), West Virginia 26062-3753; United States
- Coordinates: 40°24′35″N 80°33′5″W

Information
- Type: Private, Coeducational
- Religious affiliation: Roman Catholic
- Established: 1955
- Principal: Philip Rujak
- Grades: 7–12
- Colors: Navy and silver
- Nickname: Blue Dons
- Accreditation: North Central Association of Colleges and Schools
- Publication: The Little Magazine (Literary Magazine)
- Tuition: $4,500 (Catholic), $5,500 (non-Catholic)
- Designated Pastor: Very Rev. Fr. Dennis Schuelkens
- Dean of Students: Darrin Hicks
- Website: http://www.weirtonmadonna.org

Weirton Madonna High School is a private, Roman Catholic high school in Weirton, West Virginia. It is part of the Roman Catholic Diocese of Wheeling-Charleston.

== Principals ==
- Sr. Marian James, CSJ, 1955–1957
- Sr. Rose Winefride, 1957–58
- Sr. Mary Louise, 1958–1960
- Srs. Mary Ligouri, Adelaide William, and Mary Joan, 1960–1966
- Fr. Edward Bell, 1966–1971
- John York, 1971–1978
- James Chetock, 1978–1979
- Richard Evans, 1979–1983
- Peter Basil, 1983–1987
- Theresa DeCaria, 1987–1990
- Robert Gill, 1990–1997
- Al Boniti, 1998
- Dr. Cathy Sistilli, 1998–2008
- John Mihalyo, 2008–2012
- Steven Grasser, 2012–2014
- Jamie Lesho, 2014–2022
- Philip Rujak, 2022–2024
- Jason Heckathorn 2024–Present

== Demographics ==
As of the 2017–18 school year, the total student enrollment was 171. The ethnic makeup of the school was 97.1% White, .6% Asian and 2.3% Multiracial.

== Notable alumni ==
- Gene Trosch (1963), professional football player, Super Bowl IV champion
- Joanna Bernabei-McNamee (1993), basketball coach for the Boston College Eagles
