= Tucker County High School =

Coordinates: 39°8′14.6″N 79°34′58.9″W

Location
- 116 Mountain Lion Way; Hambleton, West Virginia 26269; United States

Information
- School type: Public high school, high school
- School district: Tucker County Schools
- Principal: Alex Cork
- Grades: 9-12
- Enrollment: 293 (2023-2024)
- Language: English
- Colors: Black and gold
- Mascot: Mountain Lion
- Feeder schools: Davis Thomas Elementary/Middle, Tucker Valley Elementary/Middle
- Website: https://www.tuckercountyschools.com/o/tch

Tucker County High School is a secondary school located in Hambleton, West Virginia, with approximately 300 students. It is located at 116 Mountain Lion Way, and serves all of Tucker County. The current principal is Alex Cork.
