= Buckhannon-Upshur High School =

Location
- 270 B-U Drive; Buckhannon, West Virginia 26201; United States

Information
- School type: Public, coeducational high school, high school
- Established: 1933
- School district: Upshur County Schools
- Superintendent: Tim Derico
- Principal: Katie Woofter
- Teaching staff: 65.25 (FTE)
- Grades: 9-12
- Enrollment: 1,120 (2023-2024)
- Student to teacher ratio: 17.16
- Language: English
- Colors: Blue and white
- Athletics conference: Big Ten Conference
- Mascot: Buccaneer
- Feeder schools: Buckhannon-Upshur Middle School
- Website: https://buhs.upshurschools.com https://reddit.com/r/buhs

Buckhannon-Upshur High School (B-UHS) is a high school located in Upshur County, West Virginia, United States. It enrolls approximately 1,300 students. It is located at 270 B-U Drive, about two miles south of Buckhannon city limits. The school offers grades 9-12, and serves all of Upshur County with some students from surrounding counties. Katie Woofter is the current principal.

== History ==
Buckhannon High School began in a wood frame building on East Main Street in Buckhannon in 1881. The school remained there until 1909, with the construction of a new facility on College Avenue. A gymnasium was added in 1922. In 1925, Upshur High School opened its doors on Route 20 about one mile south of Buckhannon High. Buckhannon High, a 7-12 school, was designated for the city students; Upshur High, a 9-12 school, was designated for the county, or country students.

Prior to the Great Depression, each West Virginia county had several district school boards. To save on expenses, each county was consolidated into its own school district. As part of this action, the Upshur County School Board consolidated the two schools in 1933, creating Buckhannon-Upshur High School. The city and county students continued to meet in separate buildings until 1958, but all extracurricular activities, such as band and athletics, met together as Buckhannon-Upshur High School.

In the early 1920s, Victoria High School, the school for Upshur County's Black population located on Victoria Street less than one block from Buckhannon High, burned down due to a faulty heating system. No students were present at the time of the incident. A new 1-12 grade facility was built on Baxter Street near West Virginia Wesleyan College.

After World War II, Upshur County's Black population dwindled considerably. Many Black families left, seeking jobs in northern industrial areas as part of the Great Migration. With just three or four Black high school students in the county, it was decided that they should be bused to Kelley-Miller School in Clarksburg so that racial segregation could be maintained. In 1954, Upshur County's school system was integrated. The few Upshur County Black students were integrated into the city branch of Buckhannon-Upshur High School without incident.

In 1958, extensive renovations took place at the Upshur, or county, branch of B-UHS, and all high school students began meeting in one facility in grades 10-12. The Buckhannon, or city, building became Buckhannon-Upshur Junior High School that same year, housing all Upshur County students in grades 7-9.

In 1977, a new campus for Buckhannon-Upshur High School was built two miles south of the old B-UHS on Route 20, and began housing grades 9-12 that year. Renovations were made to the school that had housed B-UHS since 1958, and Buckhannon-Upshur Middle School was created, housing students grades 6-8.

The Buckhannon-High that was built in 1909 was condemned in 1977, largely due to its inability to meet modern fire safety standards. It was used for storage until it was torn down in the early 1990s. The original 1881 wooden facility was moved several yards south and used to house a portion of the elementary students attending East Main Street Elementary until it was demolished in the 1970s.

== Demographics ==
As of 2020, the Buckhannon-Upshur High School student body was 97% White, 1% Black, 1% Hispanic, and 1% other. 52% of the student body was male while 48% was female. The school had a student/teacher ratio of 14.31 and per pupil expenditures of $11,720. The graduation rate was 86%. The setting of the school is fringe rural.

== Athletics ==
BUHS offers sports including football, cross-country (boys' and girls') basketball (boys' and girls'), soccer (boys' and girls'), swimming (boys' and girls'), wrestling, golf, baseball, softball, cheerleading, and lacrosse (boys' and girls'). Football started in 1909, and boys' basketball in 1912. Girls' basketball started in 1919, but was discontinued after the 1929 season and the onset of the Depression. Girls' sports reemerged in the early 1970s.

== Notable alumni ==
- Stephen Coonts, an American spy thriller and suspense novelist.
- Charley Harper, American Modernist artist.
- Weijia Jiang, White House correspondent and morning anchor for CBS News.
- Pare Lorentz, pioneering documentary filmmaker, with a film added to the National Film Registry.
- Chris Wallace, general manager of the Memphis Grizzlies.
