= Wayne High School (West Virginia) =

High school in West Virginia, United States

Location
- 100 Pioneer Road; Wayne, (Wayne County), West Virginia 25570; United States; 38.246518°N 82.434845°W

Information
- Type: Public high school
- Established: 1921; 105 years ago
- Principal: Sara Stapleton
- Staff: 47.50 (FTE)
- Grades: 9-12
- Enrollment: 575 (2023-24)
- Student to teacher ratio: 12.11
- Colors: Red and black
- Nickname: Pioneers
- Website: Wayne High School

Wayne High School is located in Wayne, West Virginia, United States, on a 200-acre (0.81 km^{2}) woodland property. The campus of thirteen single-story masonry buildings is shared with Wayne Middle School. A vocational wing was opened in the 1998–99 school year to expand curriculum offerings. Student population is about 650 as of 2006.

Wayne High School was organized in 1921 and serves 62% of the land area of the county, a distance of approximately forty miles north to south. The present site opened in 1963. About 30% of all secondary school students in Wayne County attend Wayne High School. Students are transported to the campus by bus, with the longest bus route extending thirty miles.

The number of single parent or no parent homes approaches the national average. The attendance rate is 93%. 46% of students take part in free and reduced lunch programs. 13% are full range special education pupils. Less than 50% continue to a post-secondary school.

There are 42 faculty, two full-time counselors, one library/media specialist, and one computer network administrator.

The first team state championship was in 1984 in varsity baseball. In the last several years the football team has gone to the playoffs, winning the state championship in 2006. Two students in upward bound were named the best for the area. The volleyball team went to the regionals. The JROTC got a gold star in their inspection. Rivals include Tolsia and Spring Valley High School.

== Academics ==
As of 2011, according to the West Virginia Educational Standards Test, 49% of Wayne High School students scored below grade level mastery in reading, compared to 54% of all West Virginia students. 66% of WHS students scored below grade level mastery in science, compared to 59% of all students in the state. 71%-72% of WHS students scored below grade level mastery in social studies, compared to 64% of all students in the state. 54% scored below grade level mastery in mathematics, compared to 54% of all students in the states.
