= Tolsia High School =

Location
- 1 Rebel Dr. Fort Gay, West Virginia 25514; United States; 38.00077°N 82.50061°W

Information
- School type: Public
- Founded: 1988
- School board: Wayne County Board of Education
- Colors: Orange, Blue
- Athletics conference: A
- Nickname: Rebels
- Website: www.tolsiarebelswv.org

Tolsia High School is a high school serving rural southern Wayne County, West Virginia. It has a mailing address of Fort Gay, but is actually located along U.S. 52 near Glenhayes, which is known as the "Tolsia Highway" in that area.

The school was founded in 1988 as a consolidation of Fort Gay and Crum high schools. It was named after the Tolsia Highway, which itself took its name from the Tug, Ohio, Levisa, Sandy Improvement Association.

The school maintains WFGH the only high school operated radio station in the state having a full power permit from the U.S. Federal Communications Commission (FCC).

The school has 381 students for athletic purposes, placing it in class "A" in the state. The school mascot and nickname are the "Rebels" which is styled as a soldier of the Army of Northern Virginia.

The school colors are Orange and Blue, and it uses a "T" similar to that of the University of Tennessee.
