= Bluefield High School =

Location
- 535 West Cumberland Road; Bluefield, West Virginia 24701
- Coordinates: 37.24867°N 81.21783°W

Information
- School type: AA
- Motto: "We Believe"
- Founded: 1903
- School board: Mercer County Public Schools
- Superintendent: Deborah Dale Akers
- School number: 5100
- Administrator: Sabrina Morrison
- Principal: Michael Collins
- Teaching staff: 35.00 (FTE)
- Grades: 9-12
- Enrollment: 618 (2024-2025)
- Student to teacher ratio: 17.66
- Language: English
- Colors: Maroon and white
- Mascot: Beaver
- Team name: Bluefield Beavers
- Website: https://www.boe.merc.k12.wv.us/o/bhs

Bluefield High School (BHS) is a public secondary school in Bluefield, West Virginia, United States. It is part of Mercer County Public Schools and is located at 535 West Cumberland Road. As of the 2018-2019 school year, enrollment was 609 students.

The school built a new library in 1998, which was later named after longtime librarian Mary Chmara.

== History ==
Originally Beaver High School, named for the Beaver Pond District and the future mascot, the downtown high school was established in 1903, in the fast-developing Bluefield, West Virginia. Its first graduate was in 1907, Mary Aaron. The first class, composed of ten students, graduated in 1910. The current Bluefield High School was built on West Cumberland Road and opened to students in the fall of 1957. The former Beaver High School building served as Central Junior High School for several decades. BHS, the home of the Beavers, is the oldest high school building in Mercer County.

== Athletics ==
=== State Championships ===
Listed below are all championships won by Bluefield High School.

	State Championship(s)	State Runner-Ups
Sport	Year(s)	Year(s)
Boys Basketball	1995 (AA), 1996 (AA), 2013 (AA), 2014 (AA)	1997 (AA), 1999 (AA), 2006 (AA), 2012 (AA), 2022 (AA), 2024 (AA)
Girls Basketball		1921, 1922, 2017 (AA)
Bowling	1992
Football	1959 (AAA), 1962 (AAA), 1965 (AAA), 1967 (AAA), 1975 (AAA), 1984 (AAA), 1997 (AA), 2004 (AA), 2007 (AA), 2009 (AA), 2017 (AA)	1995 (AA), 1999 (AA), 2002 (AA), 2003 (AA), 2005 (AA), 2018 (AA), 2019 (AA), 2025 (AA)
Golf	1996 (AA/A), 1997 (AA/A)	1982, 1995 (AA/A)
Girls Swim		1999
Boys Tennis	1998 (AA/A), 2000 (AA/A), 2001 (AA/A), 2002 (AA/A)
Girls Tennis	2007 (AA/A)

From 1959 to 2017, the Bluefield High School football team had a winning percentage of .728.

The classic Beaver/Graham football game is the biggest event each year for the two Bluefields. This game between cross-city rivals Bluefield High School and Graham High School is held at Mitchell Stadium. In 1991, the two schools were featured on the ESPN show Scholastic Sports America for having one of the largest high school football rivalries on the East Coast. The Beavers hold a winning record over Graham in the series, 62-24-2.

== Notable alumni ==
- John Forbes Nash Jr., an American mathematician who made fundamental contributions to game theory, real algebraic geometry, differential geometry, and partial differential equations.
- Roy Hawley, former athletic director for Marshall University and West Virginia University, namesake for Hawley Field
