= Williamstown High School (West Virginia) =

Williamstown Middle/High School

Location
- 219 West 5th St. Williamstown, West Virginia 26187; United States; 39°24′01″N 81°27′05″W

Information
- Former name: Williams District High School
- Type: Public
- Motto: Discipline, Achievement, Service, Honor
- Established: 1905; 121 years ago
- School district: Wood County Schools
- Principal: Jason Ward
- Teaching staff: 49.31 (FTE)
- Grades: 6-12
- Gender: Co-educational
- Enrollment: 639 (2023-2024)
- Student to teacher ratio: 12.96
- Campus type: Fringe Urban
- Colors: Maroon; Gold
- Song: WMHS Alma Mater
- Fight song: Washington and Lee Swing
- Athletics conference: Little Kanawha Conference
- Mascot: The Yellow Jackets
- Rivals: St. Marys High School (West Virginia), Wheeling Central Catholic (West Virginia)
- Website: www.woodcountyschoolswv.com/o/wh

Williamstown Middle/High School is a public high school in Williamstown, West Virginia, United States. It operates under the administration of Wood County Schools, enrolls approximately 600 students, and functions as one of the primary secondary education facilities for the Williamstown area. The school maintains a student–teacher ratio of about 13 to 1 and offers a curriculum that includes standard secondary coursework along with Advanced Placement classes.

== History ==
Williams District High School was established in 1905 following the consolidation of the Stapleton, Greenmont, Sand Hill, Pleasant Valley, Vienna, Williamstown, Oak Grove, Summit, Kinnaird, Plum Run, and Oak Lane Schools. The first classes were held in two rooms on the second floor of the Henderson Building on Ferry Street. A dedicated school building housing grades 1 through 12 was completed in 1908.

In 1926, the school conducted a contest to select an official seal. The winning entry, by Kathleen Bee, depicted a log cabin and a rising sun.

Williams District was dissolved in 1933 and incorporated into the Wood County School District.

A gymnasium-auditorium ("gymatorium") was constructed on December 1, 1951, at West 5th Street and Williams Avenue, and was dedicated to alumni who fought in World War I and World War II. Subsequent additions of classrooms space led to the relocation of the high school to this site in 1957. Further expansion occurred in 1974 with the addition of classrooms, a library and a cafeteria.

The school remained largely unchanged until 2019, when a new track was installed. A new wing added in 2020 introduced additional classrooms, science laboratories, an auditorium, and a dedicated room for the school's strings program. Construction of new football stadium stands began in 2022.

Current census data was reported by U.S. News & World Report.

In 2025, work began on installing a new artificial turf field at the school's athletic complex, replacing the existing grass surface and supporting expanded use for football, soccer, and band activities. By August 2025, the turf field was completed and used regularly by athletic programs.

Also in 2025, the Wood County Board of Education appointed Jacinda Taylor as assistant principal and athletic director, following her prior service as the district's middle school athletic director.

=== Williamstown (Williamstown-Waverly) Elementary School ===
The building that previously housed Williamstown High School was converted to a new Williamstown Elementary School, serving grades 1–6. The bell tower and the 3rd floor, which had been a gymnasium, were removed in 1975. The bell from the bell tower was mounted on wheels and is used at football games and in homecoming parades. Williamstown Elementary School was closed for the 2020–2021 school year, when a new Williamstown-Waverly Elementary School was built to consolidate students from Williamstown and Waverly Elementary schools. Prior to this, both the aforementioned Williamstown Elementary, as well as Waverly Elementary, were feeder schools into Williamstown High School.
