= Stonewall Jackson High School (Charleston, West Virginia) =

Coordinates: 38°22′4.1″N 81°38′57.9″W

- 812 Park Avenue; Charleston, West Virginia 25302; United States

Information
- Type: Public
- Established: 1940
- Closed: 1989
- School district: Kanawha County School District
- Grades: 10–12
- Colours: Scarlet and Grey
- Slogan: "The Wall"
- Mascot: Generals

Stonewall Jackson High School is a former high school in Kanawha County, West Virginia. It opened in 1940, and closed in 1989. It was located on the West Side of Charleston, West Virginia. In 1989, Stonewall Jackson High School and Charleston High School consolidated to become Capital High School. The building is now a middle school.

It was named after the American Civil War general Thomas "Stonewall" Jackson, who was from Clarksburg in what is now West Virginia. After the closing of the high school in 1989, it became Stonewall Jackson Junior High School and then Stonewall Jackson Middle School in 1999. In August 2020, following the Black Lives Matter movement, Stonewall's name was removed from the school, which is now called West Side Middle School.

== History ==
In the late 1930s, Charleston High School became over-crowded so Stonewall Jackson High School was built in 1940 to accommodate the students on the West Side of Charleston. During the 1980s, the student populations at CHS and SJHS dropped. In 1989, Capital High School opened, combining the students of these two former schools.

Charleston High School was torn down in mid-1989. Stonewall Jackson High School became Stonewall Jackson Junior High School that same year. A decade later, in 1999, Stonewall Jackson Junior High School became Stonewall Jackson Middle School. In August 2020, following the Black Lives Matter movement, the school was renamed West Side Middle School, part of a city-wide effort to remove memorials of Confederate soldiers. Along with Horace Mann Middle School, it is a feeder school for Capital High School.

== Notable alumni ==
- Dennis Harrah, former NFL offensive linemen, West Virginia Sports Hall of Fame
- Sara Jane Moore - attempted assassin of U.S. president Gerald Ford in 1975
