= West Virginia Secondary School Activities Commission =

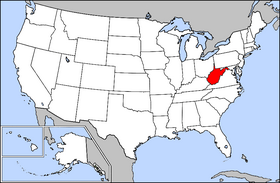
- Abbreviation: WVSSAC
- Type: Volunteer; NPO
- Legal status: Association
- Purpose: Athletic/Educational
- Headquarters: 2875 Staunton Turnpike; Parkersburg, WV 26104
- Region served: West Virginia
- Executive Director: David Price
- Affiliations: National Federation of State High School Associations
- Staff: 4
- Website: wvssac.org
- Remarks: (304) 485-5494

The West Virginia Secondary School Activities Commission (WVSSAC, but colloquially referred to as SSAC) is the main governing body of high school sports, cheerleading, and marching bands in the U.S. state of West Virginia. Beginning with the 2024-25 school year the Commission adopted a new system of four classes. Unlike the previous system, and the systems used in most other states, it is based on an algorithm where the population is 80%, the distance from a town of 10,000 people is 10%, and the median income of the parents is 10%. This system is used for football, cheerleading, basketball, and baseball/softball. Golf, cross country, track and field, are broken into 3 classes. Soccer and wrestling, are two classes. Swimming is one class only.

The organization began with boys' basketball championships in 1914. During the decades of segregated schools in West Virginia, it excluded schools for African American students. They competed in the West Virginia Athletic Union. The organization excluded private schools until 1979, when it merged with the state Catholic League. Today it also includes private schools of various religious viewpoints, along with all public schools in the state.

Unlike similar governing bodies in the United States, the WVSSAC does not dictate individual high school schedules during the regular season; those decisions are made by the coaches involved. Note that the WVSSAC does set forth some basic guidelines (i.e., the number of schools within its own classification or higher that a school must compete against) for a school to be eligible for that sport's playoffs. The WVSSAC determines scheduling during the playoffs. For example, in football, whose playoffs are seeded on a statewide basis, each game is played at the higher-seeded school's campus if its stadium is approved by the SSAC to host playoff matches. Otherwise, it is played at the SSAC-approved venue nearest to the higher-seeded school. The lower-seeded school has the choice of one of three starting times — 7:30 pm on Friday or Saturday, or 1:30 pm on Saturday.

== History ==
Prior to the decision in Brown v. Board of Education, West Virginia maintained "colored" high schools. These schools, and thus their students, were barred from competition in the WVSSAC. The institution now known as West Virginia State University funded an unofficial "state colored championship" in basketball and football until 1959. The WVSSAC historical records take no note of these champions, and does not note that its champions prior to that year competed in a system that excluded many of the state's best athletes.

West Virginia was one of only three states to hold girls' basketball in the fall, and girls' volleyball in the winter, ostensibly due to facility shortages at various high schools. Eventually the West Virginia Supreme Court of Appeals ruled that this unfairly disadvantaged girls in competition for college scholarships and the organization was forced to adopt a traditional schedule.

There also were complaints that the disparity of enrollment in the old Class AAA made it difficult for the smaller schools within that classification to compete, particularly in football. There was a 1,032 student difference between Cabell Midland and Ripley, Cabell Midland being the largest and Ripley being the smallest schools in the old Class AAA, at that time. On the other hand, there was only a 473 student difference between Ripley and the smallest Class AA school. The last time a AAA school with an enrollment under 1,000 students won a football championship was Nitro in 1998. In the 2016 re-class the number of AAA schools was reduced in order to reduce the disparity in enrollment. The 2024 algorithm system and moving to four classes was also used, in part, to ease the disparity between school enrollment size.

Multiple schools appealed the new for 2024 classification system, mostly claiming that the metric of distance to a town of 10,000 was misapplied. Ultimately 22 schools were classified down by the Board of Review, leaving only 16 teams in Class AAAA, at least for the 2024 season.

== Championships ==
The WVSSAC hosts high school state championships at these locations across West Virginia:

Sport	Venue	City	Reference
Baseball	Jack Cook Field	Huntington, WV	
Basketball	Charleston Coliseum	Charleston, WV	
Cheerleading	Charleston Coliseum	Charleston, WV	
Cross country	Cabell Midland High School	Ona, WV	
Football	University of Charleston Stadium	Charleston, WV	
Golf	Speidel Golf Club at Oglebay Park	Wheeling, WV	
Soccer	YMCA Paul Cline Memorial Sports Complex	Beckley, WV	
Softball	Little Creek Park	South Charleston, WV	
Swimming	Peak Health Aquatic Center	Morgantown, WV	
Tennis	Schoenbaum Tennis Courts / Kanawha City Community Center	Charleston, WV	
Track	University of Charleston Stadium	Charleston, WV	
Volleyball	Charleston Coliseum	Charleston, WV	
Wrestling	Marshall Health Network Arena	Huntington, WV	
