= Lookabaugh =

Lookabaugh is a surname. Notable people with the surname include:

- Guy Lookabaugh (1896–1981), American athlete
- Jim Lookabaugh (1902–1982), American football player and coach
- John Lookabaugh (1922−1993), American football player
