= List of Alpha Epsilon Delta chapters =

Alpha Epsilon Delta is a collegiate honor society for health pre-professionals. In the following list of chapters, active chapters are indicated in bold and inactive chapters are in italics.

Charter Number	Chapter	Charter date and range	Institution	Location	Status	Ref.
1	**Alabama Alpha**	April 28, 1926	University of Alabama	Tuscaloosa, Alabama	Active	
2	**Alabama Beta**	May 5, 1928	Samford University	Homewood, Alabama	Active	(Note: Chapter was established at Howard College which became Samford University in 1965.)
3	**South Carolina Alpha**	May 10, 1928	University of South Carolina	Columbia, South Carolina	Active	
4	**Texas Alpha**	January 10, 1929	University of Texas at Austin	Austin, Texas	Active	
5	**Texas Beta**	April 11, 1929	Baylor University	Waco, Texas	Active	
6	**Florida Alpha**	May 3, 1930	University of Florida	Gainesville, Florida	Active	
7	**West Virginia Alpha**	May 30, 1931	West Virginia University	Morgantown, West Virginia	Active	
8	**Alabama Gamma**	April 23, 1932	Auburn University	Auburn, Alabama	Active	
9	**Georgia Alpha**	May 7, 1932	University of Georgia	Athens, Georgia	Active	
10	**Missouri Alpha**	March 22, 1934	Central Methodist University	Fayette, Missouri	Active	
11	**Colorado Alpha**	March 22, 1934	University of Colorado Boulder	Boulder, Colorado	Active	
	Mississippi Alpha	1935	Millsaps College	Jackson, Mississippi	Inactive	
	Pennsylvania Alpha	1935–1970	Lehigh University	Bethlehem, Pennsylvania	Inactive	
	North Carolina Alpha	1936	Davidson College	Davidson, North Carolina	Inactive	
15	**North Carolina Beta**	1936–xxxx ?; April 9, 2016	University of North Carolina at Chapel Hill	Chapel Hill, North Carolina	Active	
	Virginia Alpha	1936–1969	Emory and Henry College	Emory, Virginia	Inactive	
17	**Oklahoma Alpha**	April 13, 1936	University of Oklahoma	Norman, Oklahoma	Active	
18	Illinois Alpha	1937–1960	Illinois Wesleyan University	Bloomington, Illinois	Inactive	
19	**Arkansas Alpha**	January 8, 1938	University of Arkansas	Fayetteville, Arkansas	Active	
20	**South Carolina Beta**	March 23, 1938	Furman University	Greenville, South Carolina	Active	
21	**Pennsylvania Beta**	April 23, 1938	Pennsylvania State University	State College, Pennsylvania	Active	
22	**Nevada Alpha**	May 7, 1938	University of Nevada, Reno	Reno, Nevada	Active	
	Texas Gamma	1938	Texas Tech University	Lubbock, Texas	Inactive	
24	**Mississippi Beta**	December 9, 1938	University of Mississippi	University, Mississippi	Active	
25	Mississippi Gamma	December 10, 1938	Mississippi State University	Starkville, Mississippi	Inactive	
	Idaho Alpha	1939–1962	University of Idaho	Moscow, Idaho	Inactive	
	Utah Alpha	1939	Utah State University	Irving, Texas	Inactive	
	Wyoming Alpha	1939	University of Wyoming	Laramie, Wyoming	Inactive	
29	**California Alpha**	March 19, 1939	University of Southern California	Los Angeles, California	Active	
30	California Beta	March 20, 1939 – 1975	University of Redlands	Redlands, California	Inactive	
31	**Ohio Alpha**	May 31, 1940	Ohio State University	Columbus, Ohio	Active	
	Michigan Alpha	1941	University of Detroit Mercy	Detroit, Michigan	Inactive	
	Washington Alpha	1941	Seattle University	Seattle, Washington	Inactive	
34	**Kentucky Alpha**	April 29, 1945	University of Louisville	Louisville, Kentucky	Active	
35	**New York Alpha**	January 12, 1946	Cornell University	Ithaca, New York	Active	
36	**Florida Beta**	February 23, 1946 – 1969; xxxx ?	Florida State University	Tallahassee, Florida	Active	
37	Tennessee Alpha	1946–1969	Tusculum University	Tusculum, Tennessee	Inactive	
38	New York Beta	1947	Syracuse University	Syracuse, New York	Inactive	
39	**Ohio Beta**	May 17, 1947	University of Toledo	Toledo, Ohio	Active	
	Tennessee Beta	1948	University of Tennessee	Knoxville, Tennessee	Inactive	
41	**Washington Beta**	January 17, 1948	University of Washington	Seattle, Washington	Active	
	Illinois Beta	1948–1964	Carthage		Inactive	
43	**Virginia Beta**	April 30, 1948	Washington and Lee University	Lexington, Virginia	Active	
	Florida Gamma	1948	University of Miami	Coral Gables, Florida	Inactive	
	North Carolina Gamma	1948	Wake Forest University	Winston-Salem, North Carolina	Inactive	
	Ohio Gamma	1948	Otterbein University	Westerville, Ohio	Inactive	
	Pennsylvania Gamma	1948	University of Pittsburgh	Pittsburgh, Pennsylvania	Inactive	
48	**Mississippi Delta**	October 23, 1948	University of Southern Mississippi	Hattiesburg, Mississippi	Active	
49	**New Hampshire Alpha**	March 5, 1949	University of New Hampshire	Durham, New Hampshire	Active	
50	Indiana Alpha	November 5, 1949	Indiana University	Bloomington, Indiana	Inactive	
51	Ohio Delta	1949	Bowling Green State University	Bowling Green, Ohio	Inactive	
	Indiana Beta	1950	Purdue University	West Lafayette, Indiana	Inactive	
	Tennessee Gamma	1950–1960	University of Tennessee at Chattanooga	Chattanooga, Tennessee	Inactive	
	Louisiana Alpha	1950	Tulane University	New Orleans, Louisiana	Inactive	
	Pennsylvania Delta	1950	La Salle University	Philadelphia, Pennsylvania	Inactive	
56	**Ohio Epsilon**	May 27, 1950	Denison University	Granville, Ohio	Active	
	Utah Beta	1950	University of Utah	Salt Lake City, Utah	Inactive	
	West Virginia Beta	1950	Marshall University	Huntington, West Virginia	Inactive	
	Mississippi Epsilon	1951	Mississippi University for Women	Columbus, Mississippi	Inactive	
	Ohio Zeta	1951–1968	Muskingum University	New Concord, Ohio	Inactive	
	Pennsylvania Epsilon	1951	University of Pennsylvania	Philadelphia, Pennsylvania	Inactive	
	New York Gamma	1952	Adelphi University	Garden City, New York	Inactive	
63	**Louisiana Beta**	January 16, 1954	Louisiana State University	Baton Rouge, Louisiana	Active	
64	**Rhode Island Alpha**	March 20, 1954	Providence College	Providence, Rhode Island	Active	
65	Louisiana Gamma	1955	Centenary College of Louisiana	Shreveport, Louisiana	Inactive	
66	Maryland Alpha	1956	Johns Hopkins University	Baltimore, Maryland	Inactive	
67	**Texas Delta**	December 1, 1956	University of Houston	Houston, Texas	Active	
68	**Arkansas Beta**	February 1, 1957	Hendrix College	Conway, Arkansas	Active	
	New York Delta	1957	Long Island University		Inactive	
	Louisiana Delta	1958	Tulane University	New Orleans, Louisiana	Inactive	
	Quebec Alpha	1958–1972	McGill University	Montreal, Quebec, Canada	Inactive	
	Kentucky Beta	1959	University of Kentucky	Lexington, Kentucky	Inactive	
	New York Epsilon	1959	Hofstra University	Hempstead, New York	Inactive	
	California Gamma	1960–1972	University of the Pacific	Stockton, California	Inactive	
75	**Arizona Alpha**	May 24, 1960 – 19xx ?; April 22, 2017	Arizona State University	Tempe, Arizona	Active	
	Michigan Beta	1960	Hope College	Holland, Michigan	Inactive	
	Vermont Alpha	1960–1971	Saint Michael's College	Colchester, Vermont	Inactive	
79	**Ohio Eta**	May 26, 1962	University of Dayton	Dayton, Ohio	Active	
	Connecticut Alpha	1962	Fairfield University	Fairfield, Connecticut	Inactive	
	Georgia Beta	1962–1969	Emory University	Atlanta, Georgia	Inactive	
	Indiana Gamma	1963	University of Notre Dame	Notre Dame, Indiana	Inactive	
83	**New Jersey Alpha**	January 11, 1964	Seton Hall University	South Orange, New Jersey	Active	
	Ohio Theta	1963	John Carroll University	University Heights, Ohio	Inactive	
	Virginia Gamma	1964	University of Virginia	Charlottesville, Virginia	Inactive	
	Massachusetts Alpha	1965-1972	College of the Holy Cross	Worcester, Massachusetts	Inactive	
	Mississippi Zeta	1965	Mississippi College	Clinton, Mississippi	Inactive	
	New York Zeta	1965	Yeshiva University	New York City, New York	Inactive	
	Colorado Beta	1966	University of Denver	Denver, Colorado	Inactive	
	Oklahoma Beta	1966	Oklahoma State University	Stillwater, Oklahoma	Inactive	
	New York Eta	1966–1974	Fordham University	New York City, New York	Inactive	
	Illinois Gamma	1967	Millikin University	Decatur, Illinois	Inactive	
91	**Arizona Beta**	May 13, 1967	University of Arizona	Tucson, Arizona	Active	
92	**Pennsylvania Zeta**	April 21, 1968	Villanova University	Villanova, Pennsylvania	Active	
	Wisconsin Alpha	1968	Marquette University	Milwaukee, Wisconsin	Inactive	
95	**Kentucky Gamma**	May 25, 1968	Western Kentucky University	Bowling Green, Kentucky	Active	
96	**Pennsylvania Eta**	May 26, 1968	Saint Joseph's University	Philadelphia, Pennsylvania	Active	
97	Utah Gamma	1969	Brigham Young University	Provo, Utah	Inactive	
98	**Illinois Delta**	October 19, 1969	University of Illinois Urbana-Champaign	Urbana and Champaign, Illinois	Active	
99	Utah Delta	1970	Weber State University	Ogden, Utah	Inactive	
100	**South Carolina Gamma**	February 20, 1971	Clemson University	Clemson, South Carolina	Active	
101	District of Columbia Alpha	1972	George Washington University	Washington, D.C.	Inactive	
102	Pennsylvania Theta	1973	Duquesne University	Pittsburgh, Pennsylvania	Inactive	
103	District of Columbia Beta	1974	American University	Washington, D.C.	Inactive	
104	**Louisiana Epsilon**	February 16, 1974	University of Louisiana at Monroe	Monroe, Louisiana	Active	(Note: Chapter was chartered at Northeast Louisiana University which is now called the University of Louisiana at Monroe.)
105	**Indiana Delta**	March 9, 1974	Valparaiso University	Valparaiso, Indiana	Active	
106	**Louisiana Zeta**	December 12, 1974	Louisiana Tech University	Ruston, Louisiana	Active	
107	**North Carolina Delta**	March 26, 1975	North Carolina State University	Raleigh, North Carolina	Active	
108	**California Delta**	May 10, 1975	University of San Diego	San Diego, California	Active	
	Florida Delta	1975	University of South Florida	Tampa, Florida	Inactive	
	Illinois Epsilon	1975–1976	Northwestern University	Evanston, Illinois	Inactive	
111	**Texas Epsilon**	January 23, 1976	Houston Christian University	Houston, Texas	Active	
	Pennsylvania Iota	1976	University of Scranton	Scranton, Pennsylvania	Inactive	
113	**New York Theta**	April 30, 1976	Rensselaer Polytechnic Institute	Troy, New York	Active	
114	**Louisiana Eta**	May 1, 1976	Xavier University of Louisiana	New Orleans, Louisiana	Active	
	North Carolina Epsilon	1976	East Carolina University	Greenville, North Carolina	Inactive	
116	**Nevada Beta**	May 1, 1976	University of Nevada, Las Vegas	Paradise, Nevada	Active	
117	**Kansas Alpha**	May 8, 1976	Kansas State University	Manhattan, Kansas	Active	
	Illinois Zeta	1976	Elmhurst College	Elmhurst, Illinois	Inactive	
119	**Virginia Delta**	1977–19xx ?; May 3, 2003	Virginia Tech	Blacksburg, Virginia	Active	
	Illinois Eta	1977	Loyola University Chicago	Chicago, Illinois	Inactive	
	Massachusetts Beta	1977	Boston College	Chestnut Hill, Massachusetts	Inactive	
123	**New York Iota**	May 1, 1977	University at Buffalo	Buffalo, New York	Active	
124	**Illinois Theta**	May 5, 1977	Eastern Illinois University	Charleston, Illinois	Active	
126	**California Epsilon**	May 7, 1978	University of California, Irvine	Irvine, California	Active	
127	**Texas Zeta**	April 20, 1979	Texas Christian University	Fort Worth, Texas	Active	
128	**Alabama Delta**	April 21, 1979	University of Alabama at Birmingham	Birmingham, Alabama	Active	
129	**Massachusetts Gamma**	April 22, 1979	Boston University	Boston, Massachusetts	Active	
130	**Alabama Epsilon**	May 12, 1979	University of Alabama in Huntsville	Huntsville, Alabama	Active	
131	**Alabama Zeta**	January 19, 1980	University of South Alabama	Mobile, Alabama	Active	
132						
133	**Oklahoma Gamma**	April 25, 1981	Oral Roberts University	Tulsa, Oklahoma	Active	
134	**Alabama Eta**	May 2, 1981	Birmingham–Southern College	Birmingham, Alabama	Active	
135	**Montana Alpha**	June 6, 1981	Montana State University	Bozeman, Montana	Active	
136	**South Carolina Delta**	April 17, 1982	College of Charleston	Charleston, South Carolina	Active	
	Alabama Theta	198x ?			Inactive	
139	**Texas Eta**	May 16, 1982	University of Texas at El Paso	El Paso, Texas	Active	
140	**Ohio Iota**	May 22, 1982	Youngstown State University	Youngstown, Ohio	Active	
141	**Pennsylvania Kappa**	April 23, 1983	Albright College	Reading, Pennsylvania	Active	
144	**Missouri Beta**	February 25, 1984	Saint Louis University	St. Louis, Missouri	Active	
145	**Louisiana Theta**	March 11, 1984	University of New Orleans	New Orleans, Louisiana	Active	
146	**Michigan Gamma**	May 11, 1985	Michigan State University	East Lansing, Michigan	Active	
	Michigan Delta	19xx ?			Inactive	
148	**Texas Theta**	March 8, 1986	University of North Texas	Denton, Texas	Active	
149	**Texas Iota**	April 24, 1987	Texas A&M University	College Station, Texas	Active	
150	**Alabama Iota**	January 29, 1988	Troy University	Troy, Alabama	Active	
	New York Kappa	19xx ?			Inactive	
	New York Lambda	198x ?			Inactive	
	Pennsylvania Lambda	198x ?			Inactive	
156	**Florida Epsilon**	May 5, 1989	Florida International University	Miami, Florida	Active	
157	**Texas Kappa**	April 20, 1990	Southern Methodist University	Dallas, Texas	Active	
158	Utah Epsilon ?	1990	Southern Utah University	Cedar City, Utah	Inactive	
159	**Florida Zeta**	1990–xxxx ?; September 28, 2023	University of West Florida	Pensacola, Florida	Active	
	California Zeta	1991	San Diego State University	San Diego, California	Inactive	
	Virginia Epsilon	1991	George Mason University	Fairfax, Virginia	Inactive	
	Oklahoma Delta	1991	University of Tulsa	Tulsa, Oklahoma	Inactive	
163	**Missouri Gamma**	March 18, 1992	Washington University in St. Louis	St. Louis County, Missouri	Active	
164	**New Jersey Beta**	May 6, 1992	Stevens Institute of Technology	Hoboken, New Jersey	Active	
165	**Texas Lambda**	May 11, 1992	University of Texas at San Antonio	San Antonio, Texas	Active	
166	Minnesota Alpha	April 30, 1993	University of Minnesota	Minneapolis, Minnesota	Inactive	
167	Pennsylvania Mu	January 29, 1994	Franklin & Marshall College	Lancaster, Pennsylvania	Inactive	
168	Rhode Island Beta	April 30, 1994	University of Rhode Island	Kingston, Rhode Island	Inactive	
169	Texas Mu	December 2, 1994	Trinity University	San Antonio, Texas	Inactive	
170	**Pennsylvania Nu**	October 15, 1995 – xxxx ?; April 10, 2005	Muhlenberg College	Allentown, Pennsylvania	Active	
	Georgia Gamma	19xx ?			Inactive	
172	**Georgia Delta**	March 18, 1992	Atlanta University Center	Atlanta, Georgia	Active	(Note: The Atlanta University Center Consortium is a collaboration between four historically black colleges and universities: Clark Atlanta University, Spelman College, Morehouse College, and the Morehouse School of Medicine.)
173	**Michigan Epsilon**	March 15, 1998	University of Michigan	Ann Arbor, Michigan	Active	
174	**Texas Nu**	March 21, 1998	University of Texas at Dallas	Richardson, Texas	Active	
175	**Wisconsin Beta**	February 26, 2000	University of Wisconsin–Madison	Madison, Wisconsin	Active	
176	**New Jersey Gamma**	April 30, 2000	Rutgers University	Piscataway, New Jersey	Active	
177	**California Eta**	June 3, 2000	University of California, San Diego	San Diego, California	Active	
178	**Texas Xi**	April 6, 2001	Texas A&M University–Corpus Christi	Corpus Christi, Texas	Active	
180	**Oklahoma Epsilon**	May 11, 2022	Southern Nazarene University	Bethany, Oklahoma	Active	
182	**Ohio Lambda**	May 11, 2002	University of Cincinnati	Cincinnati, Ohio	Active	
184	**Idaho Beta**	April 4, 2003	Northwest Nazarene University	Nampa, Idaho	Active	
186	**Virginia Eta**	May 3, 2003	Old Dominion University	Norfolk, Virginia	Active	
187	**Colorado Gamma**	April 3, 2004	Regis University	Denver, Colorado	Active	
188	**Nebraska Alpha**	September 11, 2004	University of Nebraska–Lincoln	Lincoln, Nebraska	Active	
190	**California Theta**	June 4, 2005	University of California, Los Angeles	Los Angeles, California	Active	
192	**New York Mu**	200x ? – 20xx ?; April 22, 2022	City College of New York	New York City, New York	Active	
193	**Louisiana Iota**	April 28, 2006	Louisiana State University Shreveport	Shreveport, Louisiana	Active	
194	**Florida Eta**	September 22, 2006	University of Tampa	Tampa, Florida	Active	
197	**Hawaii Alpha**	April 22, 2007	Hawaii Pacific University	Honolulu, Hawaii	Active	
199	**Missouri Delta**	October 28, 2007	Southeast Missouri State University	Cape Girardeau, Missouri	Active	
202	**Pennsylvania Xi**	April 13, 2022	Temple University	Philadelphia, Pennsylvania	Active	
203	**Louisiana Kappa**	May 2, 2009	Northwestern State University	Natchitoches, Louisiana	Active	
205	**West Virginia Delta**	February 7, 2010	Bethany College	Bethany, West Virginia	Active	
206	**Alabama Kappa**	February 27, 2010	University of West Alabama	Livingston, Alabama	Active	
207	**South Carolina Epsilon**	February 28, 2010	Wofford College	Spartanburg, South Carolina	Active	
208	**California Iota**	2010	Loyola Marymount University	Los Angeles, California	Active	
210	**Virginia Theta**	April 18, 2010	Roanoke College	Salem, Virginia	Active	
212	**Colorado Epsilon**	April 29, 2011	Colorado State University Pueblo	Pueblo, Colorado	Active	
213	**Tennessee Eta**	April 15, 2011	East Tennessee State University	Johnson City, Tennessee	Active	
215	**Georgia Epsilon**	April 30, 2011	Mercer University	Macon, Georgia	Active	
217	**Missouri Epsilon**	November 14, 2012	University of Missouri	Columbia, Missouri	Active	
218	**Texas Pi**	February 21, 2013	Tarleton State University	Stephenville, Texas	Active	
	New Jersey Epsilon	201x ?			Inactive	
	New York Omicron	201x ?			Inactive	
222	**Ohio Mu**	April 25, 2014	Ohio Northern University	Ada, Ohio	Active	
223	**Missouri Zeta**	April 24, 2013	Avila University	Kansas City, Missouri	Active	
226	**New Jersey Delta**	October 3, 2014	Monmouth University	West Long Branch, New Jersey	Active	
227	**Alabama Lambda**	October 19, 2014	University of North Alabama	Florence, Alabama	Active	
229	**Florida Theta**	November 4, 2014	Stetson University	DeLand, Florida	Active	
230	**Minnesota Beta**	April 19, 2015	St. Olaf College	Northfield, Minnesota	Active	
234	**New York XI**	April 9, 2016	State University of New York at Oneonta	Oneonta, New York	Active	
237	**Massachusetts Zeta**	April 17, 2016	Northeastern University	Boston, Massachusetts	Active	
239	**Tennessee Theta**	April 29, 2016	Southern Adventist University	Collegedale, Tennessee	Active	
241	**Illinois Kappa**	October 15, 2016	Bradley University	Peoria, Illinois	Active	
242	**Nebraska Beta**	November 12, 2016	University of Nebraska at Kearney	Kearney, Nebraska	Active	
243	**North Carolina Kappa**	February 4, 2017	High Point University	High Point, North Carolina	Active	
244	**Florida Iota**	April 8, 2017	Florida Southern College	Lakeland, Florida	Active	
245	**New York PI**	May 5, 2017	Manhattan College	Bronx, New York City, New York	Active	
246	**California Kappa**	April 2, 2017	Dominican University of California	San Rafael, California	Active	
	Pennsylvania Omicron	201x ?			Inactive	
248	**Virginia Kappa**	April 23, 2017	Hampden–Sydney College	Hampden Sydney, Virginia	Active	
249	**Michigan Theta**	October 20, 2018	Michigan Technological University	Houghton, Michigan	Active	
250	**Wisconsin Delta**	March 23, 2021	Carthage College	Kenosha, Wisconsin	Active	
251	**Pennsylvania Pi**	February 25, 2021	Mercyhurst University	Erie, Pennsylvania	Active	
	Pennsylvania Rho	2021 ?			Inactive	
	Pennsylvania Sigma	2021 ?			Inactive	
253	**Michigan Iota**	February 15, 2019	Western Michigan University	Kalamazoo, Michigan	Active	
254	**Virginia Mu**	February 16, 2019	Regent University	Virginia Beach, Virginia	Active	
255	**South Carolina Zeta**	November 10, 2020	Erskine College	Due West, South Carolina	Active	
256	**New Jersey Zeta**	December 7, 2019	William Paterson University	Wayne, New Jersey	Active	
257	**Pennsylvania Tau**	February 3, 2021	Holy Family University	Philadelphia, Pennsylvania	Active	
258	**California Lambda**	February 22, 2020	Azusa Pacific University	Azusa, California	Active	
259	**Massachusetts Eta**	March 24, 2021	Clark University	Worcester, Massachusetts	Active	
260	**Kansas Beta**	March 30, 2021	Tabor College	Hillsboro, Kansas	Active	
261	**South Carolina Eta**	March 17, 2021	Charleston Southern University	North Charleston, South Carolina	Active	
262	**Tennessee Iota**	November 5, 2020	Lee University	Cleveland, Tennessee	Active	
263	**California Mu**	May 3, 2021	University of California, Santa Barbara	Santa Barbara, California	Active	
264	**Oregon Alpha**	2021	Oregon Institute of Technology	Klamath Falls, Oregon	Active	
265	**South Carolina Theta**	March 4, 2022	The Citadel	Charleston, South Carolina	Active	
266	**Michigan Kappa**	October 6, 2023	Oakland University	Oakland County, Michigan	Active	
267	**Texas Tau**	March 4, 2023	University of Dallas	Irving, Texas	Active	
268	**Maryland Gamma**	April 2, 2023	Hood College	Frederick, Maryland	Active	
269	**Florida Kappa**	October 28, 2023	Embry–Riddle Aeronautical University, Daytona Beach	Daytona Beach, Florida	Active	
	Colorado Delta	20xx ?			Inactive	
	Illinois Iota				Inactive	
	Maryland Beta				Inactive	
	Massachusetts Epsilon				Inactive	
	Michigan Zeta				Inactive	
	Michigan Eta				Inactive	
	New York Nu				Inactive	
	North Carolina Zeta				Inactive	
	North Carolina Eta				Inactive	
	North Carolina Theta				Inactive	
	North Carolina Iota				Inactive	
	Ohio Kappa				Inactive	
	Tennessee Delta		University of Memphis	Memphis, Tennessee	Inactive	
	Tennessee Epsilon				Inactive	
	Tennessee Zeta				Inactive	
	Texas Omicron	20xx ?			Inactive	
	Texas Rho	20xx ?			Inactive	
	Texas Sigma	20xx ?			Inactive	
	Virginia Zeta				Inactive	
	Virginia Iota	201x ?			Inactive	
	Virginia Lambda	201x ?			Inactive	
	West Virginia Gamma				Inactive	
	Wisconsin Gamma	20xx ?			Inactive	
