= John Lookabaugh =

American football player (1922–1993)

No. 25, 15
- Position: End

Personal information
- Born: September 13, 1922; Ridgeley, West Virginia, U.S.
- Died: May 16, 1993 (aged 70); Pomona, New Jersey, U.S.
- Listed height: 6 ft 4 in (1.93 m)
- Listed weight: 216 lb (98 kg)

Career information
- High school: Ridgeley (WV)
- College: Maryland (1941–1942)

Career history
- Washington Redskins (1946–1947); Wilmington Clippers (1946–1947)

Career statistics
- Games played: 9 or 11
- Receptions: 12
- Receiving yards: 145
- Touchdowns: 1
- Stats at Pro Football Reference

John Edgar Ellsworth Lookabaugh (September 13, 1922 − May 16, 1993) was an American football player who was an end for two seasons in the National Football League (NFL) for the Washington Redskins. He played college football for the Maryland Terrapins and also spent time with the Wilmington Clippers in the American Football League (AFL).

== Biography ==
Lookabaugh was born on September 13, 1922, in Ridgeley, West Virginia. He attended Ridgeley High School and played football and basketball, as an end and a center respectively. He began attending the University of Maryland, College Park in 1941 after graduating from Ridgeley, playing for the freshman football and basketball teams. He was one of the star players of the freshman basketball squad.

In 1942, Lookabaugh was briefly on the Maryland varsity football team before being called to service in World War II. He enlisted in the United States Navy and was sent to the Bainbridge Naval Training Center in Maryland, where he played football as a tackle for their military service team. At 6 ft 4 in, he was the tallest player on the Bainbridge football team and was a member until being discharged in December 1945.

After his military service, Lookabaugh was signed by the Washington Redskins of the National Football League (NFL) to play end. At the start of the season, he was released and was sent to the Redskins' farm team, the Wilmington Clippers. He appeared in seven games for the Clippers, six as a starter, although statistics are incomplete.

At the end of October, following a Redskins loss to the Philadelphia Eagles, they recalled Lookabaugh from the Clippers. He appeared in between three and five games near the end of the season. In the 1946 season with Washington, Lookabaugh caught six passes for 67 yards, averaging 11.2 yards-per-reception while having a long of 19. In the off-season, he played basketball for the Cumberland Amvets.

Lookabaugh was re-signed for the 1947 season and had three touchdowns in an exhibition game. He initially made the team but was later sent back to the Clippers, where he teamed up with quarterback Tommy Mont, whom he had been teammates with at the University of Maryland. Lookabaugh appeared in a total of six NFL games in the 1947 season, catching six passes for 78 yards and his only career touchdown, from all-time great Sammy Baugh, with a long of 31 yards. His career was ended by a knee injury which affected him for the rest of his life. He finished his NFL career with 9 or 11 games played (sources conflict), 12 receptions for 145 yards and one touchdown.

Lookabaugh lived most of his life in Millville, New Jersey and worked as a painting contractor for over 40 years after his NFL career. He was a co-founder of the Holly City Midget Football League and coached there for five years. He was a member of the Trinity United Methodist Church in Millville. Lookabaugh died on May 16, 1993, in Pomona, New Jersey, at the age of 70.
