= Ruth Ann Davis =

American academic and educator (1936–2009)

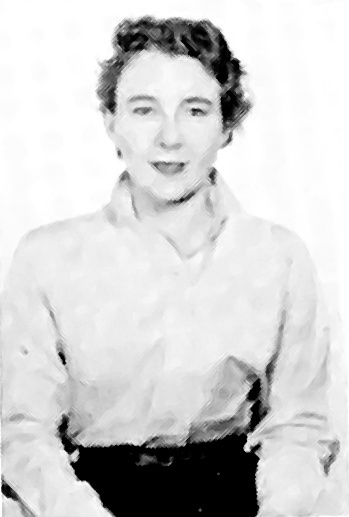
- The Catamount portrait, 1956
- Born: May 25, 1936; Keyser, West Virginia, U.S.
- Died: September 18, 2009 (aged 73); Keyser, West Virginia, U.S.
- Burial place: Queens Meadow Point Cemetery, Keyser
- Occupations: Educator; academic

Academic background
- Education: Potomac State College (AA); West Virginia University (BA); West Virginia University (MS); Wayne State University School of Medicine (Ph.D.)

Academic work
- Sub-discipline: Biology; physiology; zoology
- Institutions: West Virginia University Department of Biology (1959–1962); Clark College Department of Biology (1962–1964); Wayne State University Department of Physiology (1964–1968); Sinai Hospital (1968–1981); Ross Medical Education Center (1983); Potomac State College (1983–2001)

Ruth Ann Davis (May 25, 1936 – September 18, 2009) was an American educator and academic who lived and worked in the U.S. states of Michigan and West Virginia. Davis was born in Keyser, West Virginia, in 1936 and graduated from Keyser High School as valedictorian and an honor student in 1954. She earned an Associate of Arts degree in pre-medicine from Potomac State College of West Virginia University in 1956, her Bachelor of Arts in pre-medicine at West Virginia University in 1959, her Master of Science degree in zoology from West Virginia University in 1964, and her Doctor of Philosophy degree in physiology from Wayne State University School of Medicine in 1969.

From 1968 to 1981, Davis served as the medical technologies and laboratory supervisor at Sinai Hospital (present-day Sinai-Grace Hospital), and in 1983, she served as a clinical instructor at Ross Medical Education Center. In 1983, Davis returned to Keyser to care for her elderly parents, and served as a professor of biology and chemistry at Potomac State College, where she taught courses in chemistry, biology, medical science, nursing, and cardiopulmonary resuscitation (CPR). In 1995, Davis was named Potomac State College's Outstanding Professor of the Year. She was promoted to full professor in 1998, retired in 2001, and was granted the status of professor emerita of biology and chemistry in 2002.

In 2008, Davis made a large monetary donation to Potomac State College to support scholarships in nursing in memory of her mother, Ruth Ward Davis. It was the largest-ever single contribution made to the college. Davis died in Keyser in 2009.

== Early life and education ==
Ruth Ann Davis was born in Keyser, West Virginia, on May 25, 1936. She was the only child of George Davis and his wife Ruth Ward Davis. Her mother was a licensed practical nurse. Davis attended Keyser High School, where she was a winner of West Virginia's Golden Horseshoe Award, and graduated as valedictorian and honor student in 1954.

== Academic studies ==
Ruth Ann Davis attended and graduated from Potomac State College, Keyser, with an Associate of Arts degree in pre-medicine in 1956. She then earned her Bachelor of Arts in pre-medicine at West Virginia University in 1959. Davis then pursued graduate work at West Virginia University, where she worked as a graduate teaching assistant at the Department of Biology from 1959 to 1962. Davis was also an instructor at Clark College's Department of Biology from 1962 to 1964. In 1964, she earned her Master of Science degree in zoology from West Virginia University. She then pursued postgraduate studies at Wayne State University School of Medicine and worked as a graduate teaching instructor at that university's Department of Physiology from 1964 to 1968. In June 1969, Davis earned her Doctor of Philosophy degree in physiology from the Wayne State University School of Medicine. Davis's dissertation was on platelet cothromboplastin, and a comparative study of platelet factor III and factor VII.

== Academic career ==
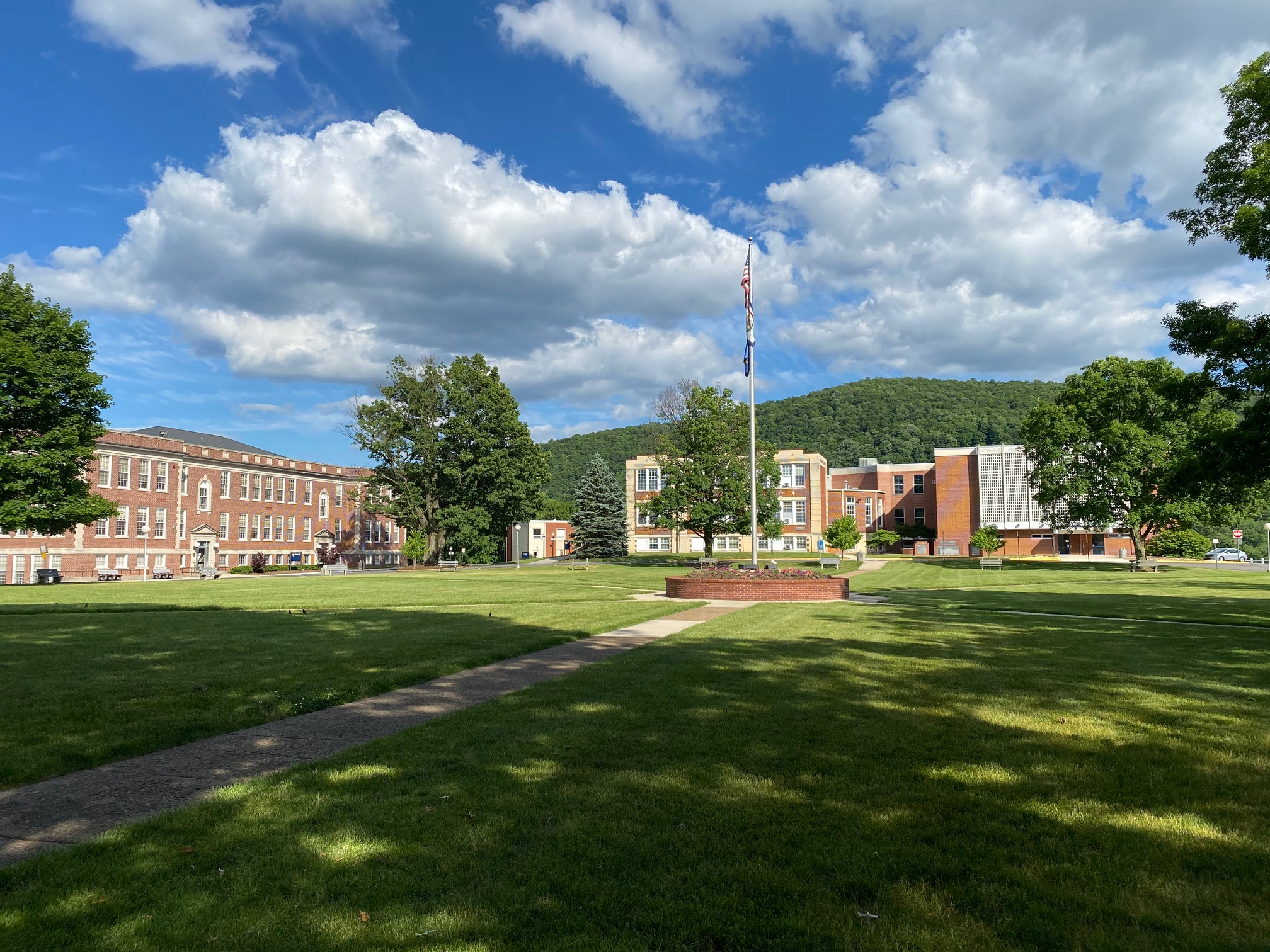
Potomac State College campus, with Science Hall on the left

From 1968 to 1981, Davis served as the medical technologies and laboratory supervisor at Sinai Hospital (present-day Sinai-Grace Hospital). In 1983, she served as a clinical instructor at Ross Medical Education Center.

In 1983, Davis returned to Keyser to care for her elderly parents, and she began her employment at Potomac State College. Davis joined the college's staff when she became an assistant professor of biology and chemistry in 1985. Davis was promoted to associate professor of biology and chemistry, and received academic tenure in 1991. At that time, she also taught courses in biology, medical science, and nursing. In 1995, Davis was named Potomac State College's Outstanding Professor of the Year. This award recognized professors' excellence in teaching, community service, and professional development or research. At the time of her award, Davis said teaching was only one important part of her job at the college, and that she especially liked academic advising and mentoring because the interaction with students was rewarding and enjoyable. At the time of her award, Davis was also serving as an academic adviser in the college's biology department.

Davis was promoted to full professor in 1998, and she retired in December 2001. The following year, she was granted the status of professor emerita of biology and chemistry.

== Organizational affiliations and philanthropy ==
Ruth Ann Davis served as a longtime faculty sponsor and adviser of Potomac State College's Life Sciences Club. She accompanied club members on their annual trips to The Bahamas. She was a member of multiple committees at the college. Davis was active in faculty governance as a member of the college's Academic Advisement Committee, Athletic Council, and Assessment Council. Davis taught the college's American Heart Association cardiopulmonary resuscitation (CPR) classes, sponsored the Regional High School Science Fair held at the college, and was a faculty adviser to the college's cheerleaders.

Throughout her life, Davis was part of academic and professional societies. She was a member of the American Association of University Women and the West Virginia Association for Women in Higher Education, both supporting women in academia. She was also part of the Irvin Stewart Society of West Virginia University, and the Ernest and Katharine Church Society of Potomac State College, two groups that honor individuals who have made significant contributions to these institutions. In addition, she was a faculty member of the Alpha Epsilon Delta chapter at West Virginia University, an honor society for pre-medical students.

In October 2008, Davis made a substantial, income-producing donation of approximately $1 million to the West Virginia University Foundation on behalf of Potomac State College. She made this endowment to support scholarships in nursing in memory of her mother Ruth Ward Davis. Davis' donation was the largest-ever single contribution made to Potomac State College. On January 17, 2009, to honor Davis for her donation, a reception was held at Moran Manor Health Care Center, where she was living. The reception was attended by Davis's friends, family, and former colleagues and students. Potomac State College also recognized Davis' gift by compiling a memory book containing memories shared by Davis's former students, faculty colleagues, and friends.

== Later life and death ==
While in Keyser, Davis lived at 161 Center Street but due to poor health, she moved to Moran Manor Health Care Center in Westernport, Maryland. Davis died on September 18, 2009, at Potomac Valley Hospital in Keyser. Her funeral service was held at Markwood Funeral Home on September 22, which was followed by a memorial reception at the campus of Potomac State College. Davis's ashes were inurned at Queens Meadow Point Cemetery, Keyser.

== Bibliography ==
- Davis, Ruth Ann (1969). Platelet Cothromboplastin: A Comparative Study of Platelet Factors 3 and 7 (PhD thesis). Detroit: Wayne State University. }. Archived from the original on October 9, 2023.
- West Virginia University Foundation (December 12, 2021). Irvin Stewart Society Member List (PDF). Morgantown, West Virginia: West Virginia University Foundation, West Virginia University. Archived (PDF) from the original on October 27, 2021.
