= Grant Noel =

American football player (born 1980)

No. 11
- Position: Quarterback

Personal information
- Born: June 11, 1980 (age 46); Ridgeley, West Virginia, U.S.
- Listed height: 6 ft 3 in (1.91 m)
- Listed weight: 223 lb (101 kg)

Career information
- High school: Frankfort (Ridgeley)
- College: Virginia Tech (1998–2002)
- NFL draft: 2003: undrafted

Career history
- Baltimore Ravens (2003)*
- * Offseason or practice squad member only

Career NFL statistics
- TD–INT: 0-0
- Passing yards: 0
- Passer rating: 0

David Grant Noel (born June 11, 1980) is an American former professional football quarterback who played college football for the Virginia Tech Hokies. He briefly played for the Baltimore Ravens of the National Football League (NFL).

== Early life ==
Noel was born on June 11, 1980, in Ridgeley, West Virginia. He was ranked the number two ranked quarterback in the northeast by PrepStar and he was named a top fifteen quarterback in the northeast by the G&W Recruiting Report out of Frankfort High School. He committed to Virginia Tech in 1998.

== College career ==
In 1998, Noel was redshirted.

In 1999 and 2000, Noel backed up future first overall pick Michael Vick. In those two years as a backup to Vick, Virginia Tech went 11–1 in 1999 and an appearance in the Sugar Bowl, in 2000, the team went 11–1 again and won the Gator Bowl.

In 2001, Noel's junior season, he was named the starting quarterback after Vick left for the NFL draft. He was injured during a summer workout that caused him to miss three-to-six weeks, he was still healthy for the start of the 2001 season. He led the team to a 6–0 record to start the season and the team was ranked as high as five going into their game against Syracuse which would be the team's first loss of the season falling 14–22. The loss against the Orange would begin the final stretch of the season that saw the team lose four of their last six including a Gator Bowl loss against Florida State. Noel finished the season with 1,826 yards, sixteen touchdowns, and eleven interceptions as the Hokies ended the season 8–4.

In 2002, Noel was once again slated to be the starter despite tearing his ACL he would play through it for his redshirt senior season. The team started 1–0 after beating Arkansas State where he did not finish the game. Noel got injured in the team's second game against LSU. He would never be able to regain his starting spot again as sophomore Bryan Randall took over and led the team to an 8–0 start. The team finished the year 10–4 as they lost four of their last six. Against number one ranked Miami, Noel came in the game in relief of Randall and completed a seven-yard touchdown pass to Ernest Wilford to bring the Hokies within two scores of the Hurricanes, though the late Hokies rally would fall short.

=== Statistics ===
Year	Team	Games	Passing								Rushing			
Year	Team	GP	Comp	Att	Pct	Yards	Avg	TD	Int	Rate	Att	Yards	Avg	TD
1998	Virginia Tech	DNP												
1999	Virginia Tech	12	1	2	50.0	10	5.0	0	0	92.0	0	0	0.0	0
2000	Virginia Tech	3	4	10	40.0	49	4.9	0	0	81.2	1	5	5.0	0
2001	Virginia Tech	11	146	254	57.5	1,826	7.2	16	11	130.0	61	-14	-0.2	2
2002	Virginia Tech	5	7	18	38.9	86	4.8	2	0	115.7	1	-2	-2.0	0
Career		31	158	284	55.6	1,971	4.8	18	11	127.1	63	-11	-0.2	2

== Professional career ==
Noel briefly played for the Baltimore Ravens of the National Football League (NFL) after going undrafted in the 2003 NFL draft.
