= William E. Shuck Jr. =

United States Marine Corps Medal of Honor recipient

William Edward Shuck Jr.
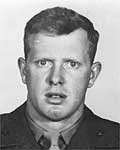
- William E. Shuck Jr., posthumous Medal of Honor recipient
- Born: August 16, 1926; Cumberland, Maryland, U.S.
- Died: July 3, 1952 (aged 25) near Panmunjom, Korea
- Burial place: Saints Peter and Paul Catholic Cemetery, Cumberland, Maryland
- Military career
- Allegiance: United States of America
- Branch: United States Navy; United States Marine Corps
- Service years: 1944–1946 (USNR); 1947–1952 (USMC)
- Rank: Staff Sergeant
- Units: Company G, 3rd Battalion, 7th Marines, 1st Marine Division
- Conflicts: Korean War †
- Awards: Medal of Honor; Purple Heart

William Edward Shuck Jr. (August 16, 1926 – July 3, 1952) was a United States Marine who posthumously received the Medal of Honor for his "heroic actions" during the Korean War on July 3, 1952.

== Early life and education ==
Shuck was born in Cumberland, Maryland on August 16, 1926, and grew up in Ridgeley, West Virginia. He was a 1944 graduate of Ridgeley High School.

== Career ==
He was a member of the Naval Reserve from 1944 to 1946. On November 14, 1947, he enlisted in the U.S. Marine Corps. During the Korean War, Shuck was a machine gun squad leader in the 7th Marines, 1st Marine Division. On July 3, 1952, during an assault against an enemy position, Shuck was wounded by enemy fire and his commanding officer was killed. Despite being wounded, he took over leading his unit and evacuating personnel. As he was lifting the stretcher of the last wounded Marine, Shuck was killed by sniper fire. For his heroic actions on that day, he was posthumously awarded the Medal of Honor; the medal was presented to his widow by September 9, 1953 by then-Vice President Richard Nixon.

== Medal of Honor citation ==
The Medal of Honor was presented to SSgt Shuck's widow, Victoria Shuck by Vice President Richard M. Nixon at a presentation ceremony held at the Marine Barracks, Washington, D.C., on September 9, 1953. His citation reads:

For conspicuous gallantry and intrepidity at the risk of his life above and beyond the call of duty while serving as a squad leader of Company G, in action against enemy aggressor forces. When his platoon was subjected to a devastating barrage of enemy small-arms, grenade, artillery, and mortar fire during an assault against strongly fortified hill positions well forward of the main line of resistance, S/Sgt. Shuck, although painfully wounded, refused medical attention and continued to lead his machine gun squad in the attack. Unhesitatingly assuming command of a rifle squad when the leader became a casualty, he skillfully organized the 2 squads into an attacking force and led 2 more daring assaults upon the hostile positions. Wounded a second time, he steadfastly refused evacuation and remained in the foremost position under heavy fire until assured that all dead and wounded were evacuated. Mortally wounded by an enemy sniper bullet while voluntarily assisting in the removal of the last casualty, S/Sgt. Shuck, by his fortitude and great personal valor in the face of overwhelming odds, served to inspire all who observed him. His unyielding courage throughout reflects the highest credit upon himself and the U.S. Naval Service. He gallantly gave his life for his country.

== Legacy ==
Shuck Hall on Marine Corps Base Quantico is named in his honor.

== See also ==
- List of Medal of Honor recipients
- List of Korean War Medal of Honor recipients
