= Frankfort High School (West Virginia) =

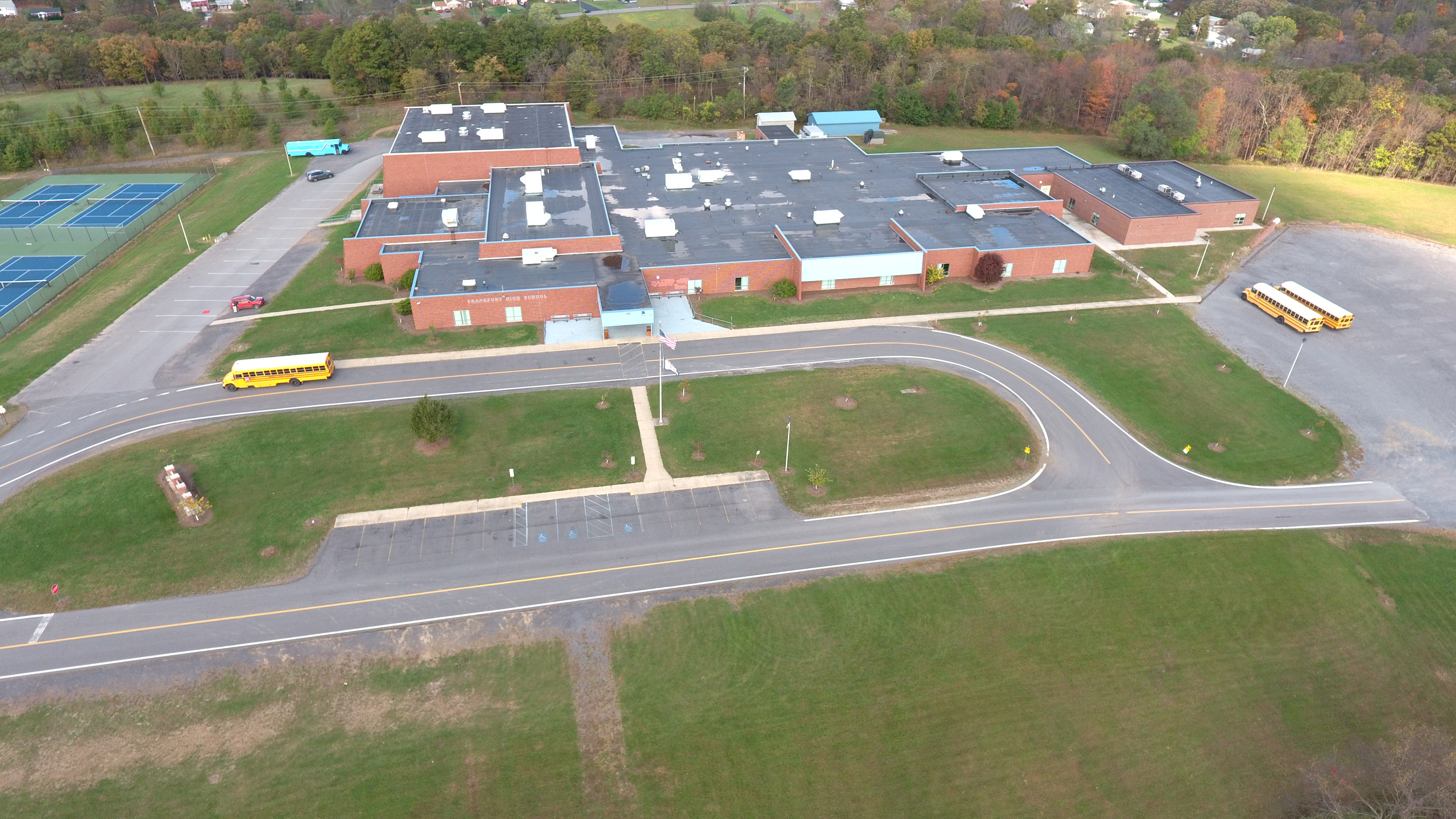
- Aerial view of Frankfort High

Location
- 393 Falcon Way; Ridgeley, West Virginia 26753; United States; 39°32′54″N 78°48′13″W

Information
- Other name: FHS
- Type: Public high school
- Motto: The Falcon Way
- Opened: Fall 1976
- School board: Mineral County Board of Education
- School district: Mineral County Schools (Frankfort District)
- State Department and Board: West Virginia Department of Education (West Virginia Board of Education)
- Superintendent: Troy Ravenscroft
- CEEB code: 491100
- NCES School ID: 540087000717
- Principal: Orie Pancione
- Assistant Principal: Heather Morrison
- Teaching staff: 32.55 (on an FTE basis)
- Grades: 9–12
- Enrollment: 488 (2024-2025)
- Student to teacher ratio: 14.99
- Schedule: Block
- Colors: Columbia blue and silver
- Athletics: AA
- Athletics conference: Potomac Valley Conference (PVC)
- Sports: Football; Golf; Cross Country; Soccer; Cheerleading; Basketball; Wrestling; Bowling; Softball; Track & Field; Baseball; Tennis
- Mascot: Falcon
- Nickname: Frankfort Falcons
- Rival: Keyser High School
- Newspaper: Falcon Times
- Yearbook: Talon
- Feeder schools: Frankfort Middle School
- Website: www.boe.mine.k12.wv.us/o/frankfort-hs

Frankfort High School (FHS) is a public high school in Ridgeley, West Virginia, United States. It is part of the Mineral County Schools district.

== History ==
Frankfort High School was built as a result of the consolidation of Fort Ashby High School and Ridgeley High School, the doors of Frankfort opened in 1976, and the first graduating class was in 1977. The high school was headed by Joseph E. Riley for 16 years up until his retirement in September 2020. Following his retirement, Riley was succeeded by Orie Pancione.

In 2022 Frankfort High School was ranked the #9 high school in West Virginia and the #1 high school in the Cumberland, MD Metro Area by U.S. News.

== Academics ==
Frankfort High School has one of the highest graduation rates in the entire country at 95%. The high school also boasts impressive reading and math comprehension levels at 64% for reading and 43% for math, compared to the national averages of 34% and 26% respectively.

The school is also consistently above the rest of the country in their SAT and ACT exam scores. FHS's average SAT score is 1170 with an average of 580 in Math and 580 in Verbal, compared to the national average of 1051. The school's average ACT score is 24 compared to the national score of 20.6.

== Extracurricular activities ==
=== Athletics ===
Frankfort won its first double A state Football championship in 2024 and 2025.

The latest XC state championship came in 2021 when the boys cross-country team finished second (while the girls' team finished fifth,) nearly bringing home the state title. This follows their victory at the state championship in 2020. As well as having a flourishing XC team, the track teams are also among the top in the area, and the girls' track team were state champs in 2013.

Frankfort also has an impressive football program headed by Coach Kevin Whiteman. Following their 49-42 victory over Bluefield in the 2025 WVSSAC Class AA State Championship, the Frankfort Falcons extended their winning streak to 28 games. As of early December 2025, they completed an undefeated 14-0 season and earned their second consecutive state title. The Frankfort Falcons beat the Keyser Golden Tornados 32-14 at the 2022 Mineral Bowl. In 2021 Coach Whiteman was named Coach of the Year by the Potomac Highlands’ coaches.

The school hosts a baseball team, headed by Matt Miller, and has gone onto go to state championships multiple times over the years. Also, the baseball team won the state championship in 1988 and in 2024.

Frankfort hosts two successful bowling teams, the girls' being coached by teacher Kenneth Cowgill, nicknamed "Coach K" by the students. The boys being coached by Coach Chad, or "Gnomeo." The team is also led by associate coaches Chris and Alex. In 2022, the girls' team finished 3rd at the regional bowling showcase at White Oaks Bowling Alley, while the boys' team achieved 1st place.

The following sports are offered at Frankfort:

- Fall: soccer, football, golf, cross-country, volleyball, band, cheerleading
- Winter: basketball, wrestling, bowling, band, cheerleading
- Spring: baseball, softball, tennis, track, band

=== Miss. Falcon Contest ===
Miss. Falcon is an annual contest organized by the Frankfort Athletic Boosters. Contestants are nominated by the booster to run and they can accept or decline to run for Miss. Falcon. Money raised goes to the athletic boosters with a portion going to a sport of contestant choice. The contestant who raises the most is crowned Miss. Falcon at the first home football game. They raise money through donations, raffles, spirit nights, fundraisers, and more. The 2024 Miss Falcon is Payton Bennett. The current record is $29,080.36 set by 2021 Miss Falcon Abigayle Olenchick.

=== Arts ===
The high school hosts three separate instrumental ensembles, including marching band, concert band, and a jazz ensemble.

The Frankfort High School Falcon Band “Mineral County’s Finest” was headed by Roger Walker (up until 2022-2023), who was inducted into the West Virginia Marching Band Directors Hall of Fame in 2019. The current band director is Shania Farris. Under Walker's direction, the concert band has consistently received Superior ratings at the regional Concert Adjudication Festival. The award-winning marching band was selected to represent West Virginia in the second Inaugural Parade of President Barack Obama on January 21, 2013. In 2017, the band was also selected to represent West Virginia in the Inaugural Parade of President Donald Trump on January 20, 2017.

The high school also hosts a drama program that frequently puts on performances for the public, including annual Christmas performances, talent shows, and crowd-interactive murder mystery dinners.

== Notable alumni ==
- Lynndie England, former U.S. Army reservist who was convicted of war crimes in connection with the Abu Ghraib prisoner abuse scandal during the Iraq War
- Grant Noel, professional football player
