= Mineral County Schools =

School district in West Virginia, United States

Mineral County Schools is the operating school district within Mineral County, West Virginia. The district is governed by the Mineral County Board of Education. The superintendent for Mineral County Schools is Troy Ravenscroft M.Ed. Ravenscroft became superintendent July 2019. Kelli Wilson is the Assistant Superintendent. The Board of Education members are Donald Ashby Jr. (President), Terry Puffinburger (Vice-President), Gordon Brubaker, Thomas Denne, and Brett Ridgel.

Mission

Success for all students - no exceptions, no excuses.

Vision

The vision of the school system is to inspire students to become high achieving, creative, lifelong learners and productive, caring, responsible, American citizens.

== Schools ==
=== Vocational school ===
- Mineral County Technical Center

=== High schools ===
- Frankfort High School
- Keyser High School

=== Middle schools ===
- Frankfort Middle School
- Keyser Middle School

=== Elementary school ===
- Frankfort Elementary School

=== Primary schools ===
- Burlington Primary School
- Fountain Primary School
- New Creek Primary School
- Elk Garden Primary School
- Keyser Primary School

== Schools no longer in operation ==
- Cross Elementary School
- Elk Garden High School
- Fort Ashby High School
- Fort Ashby Middle School
- Fort Ashby Primary School
- Frankfort Intermediate School
- Piedmont High School
- Ridgeley High School
- Ridgeley Middle School
- Ridgeley Primary School
- Short Gap Primary School
- Wiley Ford Primary School
