= Robert G. Voight =

American academic

- Born: Robert Guy Voight; March 26, 1921; Council Bluffs, Iowa, U.S.
- Died: May 26, 2008 (aged 87); Tulsa, Oklahoma, U.S.
- Resting place: Green Hill Memorial Gardens Cemetery, Sapulpa, Oklahoma
- Occupation: Academic

Robert Guy Voight (March 26, 1921 – May 26, 2008) was an American professor at Oral Roberts University. He was the faculty member that has served the longest at Oral Roberts University, as of May 7, 2009. Voight, who served 41 years, was followed by Howard M. Ervin, who served 40 years on the faculty.

== Early life ==
Voight was born on March 26, 1921, in Council Bluffs, Iowa.

== Faculty Emeritus Award ==
Dr. Robert Guy Voight [was] ... presented with [a] faculty emeritus award by Interim President Dr. Ralph Fagin ... during the ceremony. Dr. Voight, currently the director of Faculty Records, began teaching at ORU in the 1960s.

== Academic biography ==
He graduated from Sapulpa High. In 1941 he was ordained and started his 67 years of Ministry with revivals and speaking engagements. He led a church in Siloam Springs, AR for 5 years until 1959 and then moved to Tulsa, OK where he was pastor at Central Assembly of God Church at 5th and Peoria. Robert earned his Bachelor of Arts Degree from John Brown University, Suma Cumae Laud. He earned his Master of Arts Degree from University of Arkansas and his Doctor of Philosophy from the University of Arkansas. In 1967 he was invited to join Oral Roberts University. The next 41 years he served in the following capacities; Professor of English, Chair of English Department, Dean and Vice President of Student Affairs, Dean of the School of Arts and Sciences, Dean of Instruction and Vice Provost of Academic affairs. He was elected to Phi Beta Kappa, Phi Delta Kappa, Alpha Epsilon Delta Honors Societies. For 25 years he taught Oral Robert's course "Holy Spirit in the Now". He had a single message that he continued to share with his sixteen thousand plus students, "God loves you." Upon retirement in May 2008, Oral Roberts University honored Dr. Robert Voight with Professor Emeritus Standing.

== Death ==
Voight died of bladder cancer on May 26, 2008, in Tulsa, Oklahoma, at the age of 87. He was buried on May 29, 2008, in Green Hill Memorial Gardens Cemetery in Sapulpa, Oklahoma.
