= Alpha Epsilon Delta =

American health preprofessional honor society

- ΑΕΔ
- Founded: April 28, 1926; 100 years ago University of Alabama
- Type: Honor
- Affiliation: ACHS
- Status: Active
- Emphasis: Health pre-professional
- Scope: National (US)
- Motto: "Truth I Pursue"
- Colors: Red and Violet
- Flower: Red Rose
- Publication: The Scalpel
- Chapters: 270
- Members: 229,000 lifetime
- Headquarters: AED National Office; TCU Box 298810; Fort Worth, Texas 76129-0001; United States
- Website: aednational.com

Alpha Epsilon Delta (ΑΕΔ) is an American health pre-professional honor society. The organization currently has more than 229,000 members within 270 chapters at universities throughout the United States, making it the world's largest honor society serving all students from different backgrounds in the pursuit of a healthcare career. It was established on April 28, 1926, at the University of Alabama.

== History ==
On April 28, 1926, fifteen premedical students at the University of Alabama met with Dr. Jack Montgomery, premedical adviser and professor of organic chemistry, to formalize the organization of a new premedical honor society. Baylor University, Samford University, The University of Texas, and the University of South Carolina established chapters in 1928/29. At the first national convention at the University of Alabama on April 18, 1930, ten members representing five chapters and one petitioning group were in attendance.

In February 1929 the first two women were initiated as members, making Alpha Epsilon Delta one of the earliest co-educational honor societies established. It joined the Association of College Honor Societies in 1945. In 1949, Alpha Epsilon Delta was incorporated in the State of Michigan. It reincorporated in the District of Columbia as a nonprofit, educational organization in February 1962. By 2011, it had 179 active chapters and 168,178 initiates.

The business of the society is conducted by the National Officers, Regional Directors, and active chapters, with authorization of the national convention, held biennially.

Alpha Epsilon Delta (AED) has today become the world's largest Honor Society exclusively serving premedical education, with a membership exceeding 229,000 in 270 chapters. Its national headquarters is located in Fort Worth, Texas.

== Symbols ==
The Alpha Epsilon Delta badge consists of a hexagonal key or pin on the face of which is inscribed ΑΕΔ in a longitudinal column. The key is reminiscent of the benzene ring, while the border is emblematic of the continuity of premedical science.

Alpha Epsilon Delta's motto is "Truth I Pursue". Baird's Manual had originally listed the society's colors as ultraviolet and infrared; the current Constitution notes them as red and violet. The society's flower is the red rose.

The society's magazine, The Scalpel, is published at least two times per year. It also published AED Newsletter at least four times per year.

== Membership ==
Membership is open to undergraduate students with a major interest in medicine and who meet the minimum requirements. Some chapters offer an Associate membership for those who have yet to meet these requirements.

- Achievement of 3.3 or higher (on a 4.0 scale) in science and overall GPA
- Complete at least three semesters (five quarters) of college credit/preprofessional health work
- Good standing with your University's chapter
- A certain number of volunteer hours may be required as well

== Chapters ==
Alpha Epsilon Delta has chartered 270 chapters in the United States.

== Notable members ==
- Ruth Ann Davis – professor of biology and chemistry at Potomac State College
- W. Bruce Fye – cardiologist and emeritus professor of medicine and the history of medicine at the Mayo Clinic
- Melvin Spencer Newman – chemist and Ohio State University professor
- Mike Petri – rugby union player and coach
- Bert Vogelstein – professor of oncology and pathology at the Johns Hopkins School of Medicine
- Robert G. Voight – professor and chair of English at Oral Roberts University

== See also ==
- Honor cords
- Honor society
