= Keyser High School =

Location
- 1 Tornado Way; Keyser, West Virginia 26726; United States
- Coordinates: 39.400148°N 79.021048°W

Information
- Other name: KHS
- School type: Public high school
- School board: Mineral County Board of Education
- School district: Mineral County Schools
- Educational authority: West Virginia Department of Education
- Oversight: West Virginia Board of Education
- Superintendent: Troy Ravenscroft
- Principal: Matthew Ravenscroft
- Teaching staff: 40.38 (on an FTE basis)
- Grades: 9-12
- Enrollment: 662 (2023-2024)
- Student to teacher ratio: 16.39
- Colors: Black and gold
- Athletics: AA
- Athletics conference: Potomac Valley Conference (PVC)
- Sports: Football; Golf; Cross Country; Soccer; Cheerleading; Basketball; Wrestling; Bowling; Softball; Track & Field; Baseball; Tennis
- Mascot: Tornado
- Nickname: Golden Tornado
- Rival: Frankfort High School
- Yearbook: Keyhisco
- Feeder schools: Keyser Middle School
- Website: www.boe.mine.k12.wv.us/o/keyser-hs

Keyser High School is a comprehensive four-year public high school located in Keyser, West Virginia, in Mineral County that operates as part of the Mineral County Schools District.

== History ==
Piedmont High School was combined into Keyser High School in 1976. In the late 1990s, Keyser High School moved from its former location on East Piedmont Street, which had served as Keyser High for over 100 years, to a new facility approximately three miles south. The original Keyser High School on East Piedmont Street is still standing to this very day.

In 2022 Keyser High was ranked #79 out of 116 West Virginia high schools by U.S. News. Keyser was also ranked #3 out of six high schools in the Cumberland, MD Metro Area.

== Curriculum ==
Eligible students may take courses at the Mineral County Technical Center.

== Notable alumni ==
- Ruth Ann Davis, American educator and academic
- Jonah Edward Kelley, Medal of Honor recipient
- John Kruk, Major League Baseball player and ESPN commentator
- Catherine Marshall, author
- Gary Howell, businessman and politician
