= Ridgeley, West Virginia =

- Town
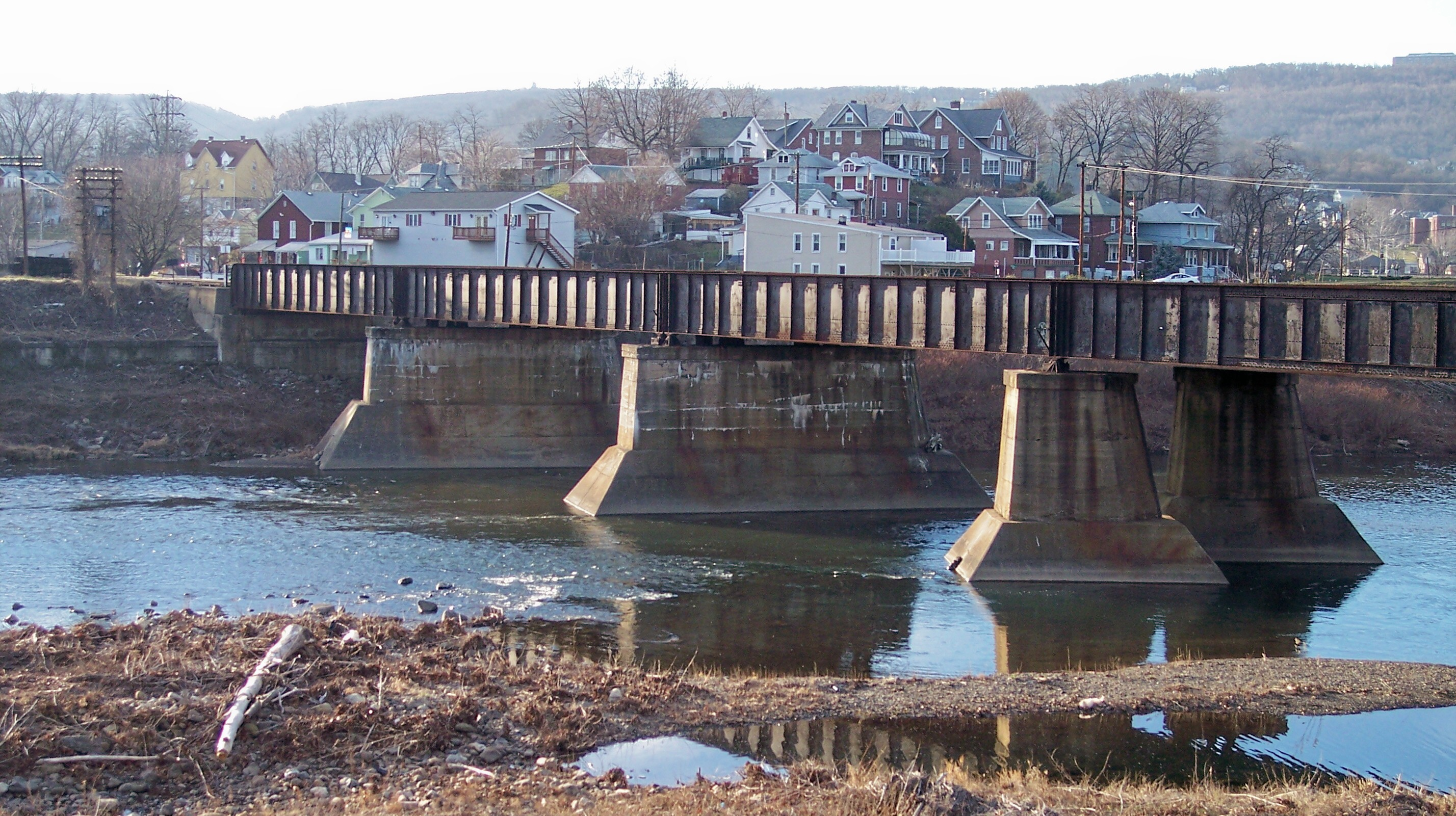
- Ridgeley and the North Branch of the Potomac River, as viewed from Cumberland, Maryland, in 2007

- Seal

- Location of Ridgeley in Mineral County, West Virginia.
- Coordinates: 39°38′35″N 78°46′16″W
- Country: United States
- State: West Virginia
- County: Mineral

Government
  - Type: Mayor/council

Area
  - Total: 0.30 sq mi (0.78 km^{2})
  - Land: 0.29 sq mi (0.75 km^{2})
  - Water: 0.0077 sq mi (0.02 km^{2})
- Elevation: 689 ft (210 m)

Population (2020)
  - Total: 591
  - Estimate (2021): 584
  - Density: 2,135.9/sq mi (824.66/km^{2})
- Time zone: UTC-5 (Eastern (EST))
  - Summer (DST): UTC-4 (EDT)
- ZIP code: 26753
- Area code: 304
- FIPS code: 54-68260
- GNIS feature ID: 2391388
- Website: local.wv.gov/ridgeley/Pages/default.aspx

Ridgeley is a town in Mineral County, West Virginia, United States, and part of the Cumberland Metropolitan Statistical Area. The population was 590 people at the 2020 census.

Ridgeley was initially known as St. Clairsville, named for Sir John St Clair, Lt Colonel and Quartermaster General for the British General Edward Braddock. St Clair accompanied Braddock on his ill-fated march on Fort Duquesne and his disastrous defeat on July 9, 1755. It was incorporated as Ridgeley on November 28, 1914, named for the former owners of the land upon which the town was built.

== Geography ==
Ridgeley is located along the North Branch of the Potomac River, opposite Cumberland, Maryland.

According to the United States Census Bureau, the town has a total area of 0.30 square miles (0.78 km^{2}), of which 0.29 square miles (0.75 km^{2}) is land and 0.01 square miles (0.03 km^{2}) is water.

== Transportation ==
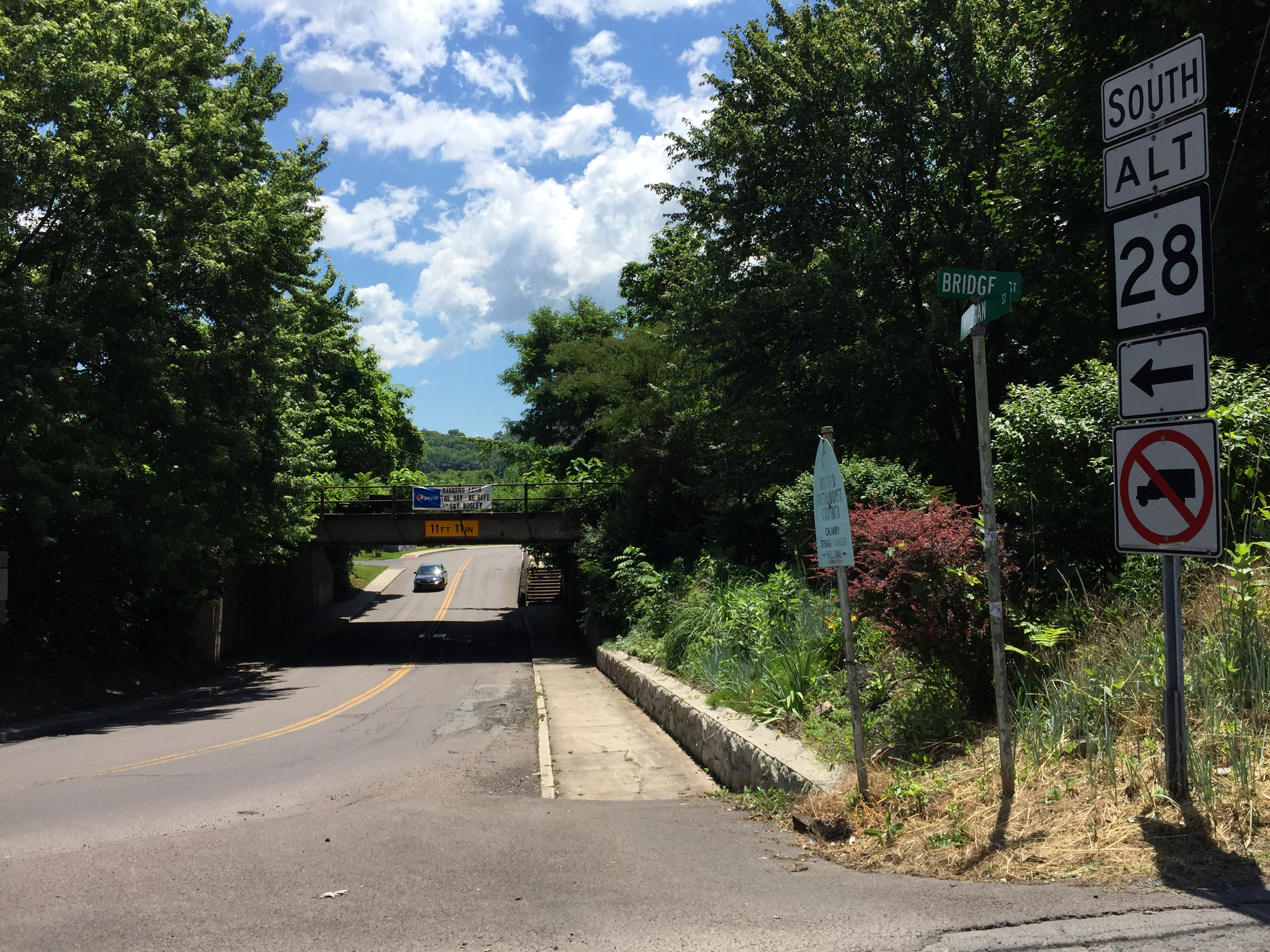
WV 28 Alt southbound in Ridgeley

The main road providing access to the town is West Virginia Route 28 Alternate. WV 28 Alt connects southward to West Virginia Route 28, which leads to Romney. To the north, WV 28 Alt crosses the Blue Bridge into Cumberland, Maryland. The nearest Interstate and U.S. highways are Interstate 68, U.S. Route 40 and U.S. Route 220, all of which are located in Cumberland.

== Geology ==
The type locality of the Ridgeley Member of the Old Port Formation is located in the town. The Ridgeley name is given to local sandstone in honor of Ridgeley, WV, the far eastern boundary of the formation. It is primarily a sandstone, and is quarried locally.

== Demographics ==
Historical population
| Census | Pop. | Note | %± |
|---|---|---|---|
| 1920 | 1,709 | | — |
| 1930 | 1,972 | | 15.4% |
| 1940 | 1,907 | | −3.3% |
| 1950 | 1,754 | | −8.0% |
| 1960 | 1,229 | | −29.9% |
| 1970 | 1,112 | | −9.5% |
| 1980 | 994 | | −10.6% |
| 1990 | 779 | | −21.6% |
| 2000 | 762 | | −2.2% |
| 2010 | 675 | | −11.4% |
| 2020 | 591 | | −12.4% |
| 2021 (est.) | 584 | ▼ | −1.2% |
U.S. Decennial Census

As of 2000 the median household income was $26,016 and the median family income was $36,042. Males had a median income of $29,250 compared with $20,227 for females. The per capita income for the town was $14,199. About 13.3% of families and 16.3% of the population were below the poverty line, including 18.0% of those under age 18 and 17.7% of those age 65 or over.

=== 2010 census ===
As of the census of 2010, there were 675 people, 301 households, and 180 families residing in the town. The population density was 2,327.6 inhabitants per square mile (898.7/km^{2}). There were 377 housing units at an average density of 1,300.0 units per square mile (501.9 units/km^{2}). The racial makeup of the town was 92.4% White, 0.6% African American, 0.3% Native American, 4.1% Asian, and 2.5% from two or more races.

There were 301 households, of which 26.2% had children under the age of 18 living with them, 43.5% were married couples living together, 12.3% had a female householder with no husband present, 4.0% had a male householder with no wife present, and 40.2% were non-families. 35.2% of all households were made up of individuals, and 15.9% had someone living alone who was 65 years of age or older. The average household size was 2.24 and the average family size was 2.86.

The median age in the town was 40.8 years. 21.2% of residents were under the age of 18; 8.6% were between the ages of 18 and 24; 25.3% were from 25 to 44; 25.8% were from 45 to 64; and 19.1% were 65 years of age or older. The gender makeup of the town was 45.6% male and 54.4% female.

== Education ==
Ridgeley is within the Mineral County Schools district. Frankfort High School is located near Short Gap and contains the grades 9–12.

== History ==
The land on which the town is built was originally conveyed from Thomas Lord Fairfax to George Mason in 1749. In 1750, the first frontier fort, Fort Ohio, was built at Ridgeley. It was, at the time, the westernmost outpost of colonial civilization and was most commonly referred to as the "New Store" settlement at the time. The New Store was primarily a trading post created by the Ohio Company which included prominent members including George Mason and Lawrence Washington. Christopher Gist was in charge of construction of "New Store" which was just over what is now the Blue Bridge leading into Ridgeley from Cumberland. The settlement was used as a headquarters for traders and trappers from 1750 and 1763, and also served as a local fort outpost to shelter travelers or workers in the event of an Indian attack. Early Ohio Company residents who worked at the settlement (and who explored the surrounding countryside) included Hugh Parker and Christopher Gist. According to a history of the time, there were no white settlers in the area at this point. Lowdermilk's 1878 history reflects that at this point, the area was on the very outside of civilization; in fact, Lowdermilk refers to it as the "very outskirts of civilization. The country beyond was an unbroken and almost pathless wilderness. It was separated by many miles of tortuous mountain roads from the settlements in the east".

In May 1754, George Washington led a company of troops to meet Joshua Fry at the storehouses at Fort Ohio. Fry was a colonel and commander in the Virginia Militia. He was to take command of the forces sent to the frontier. Fry was thrown from his horse on the way to the fort and died. Washington's notes reflected that Fry was carefully tended to but died, and was buried "on the hill", which is what the area around Fort Ohio (now Ridgeley) was referred to at that time. Washington then took command of the troops, his first military command. Washington staged an attack from Fort Ohio against a French detachment of 40 men that resulted in the death of French diplomat Ensign Joseph Coulon de Jumonville, who had been alleged to be a spy. De Jumonville's brother in law confronted Washington, who eventually signed a document asserting that he had "assassinated" du Jumonville. The document was in French, which Washington could not read; eventually Washington stated that he had signed the document to get himself and his troops safely released and out of the terrible weather. The killing of du Jumonville is considered to have been the first shot fired in the French and Indian War.

In spring 1755, Washington returned to the area to prepare for General Edward Braddock's attack on Fort Duquesne (commonly referred to as Braddock's March). Fort Cumberland was under construction at the time, and was used as the center of planning for the attack, while Fort Ohio was commandeered and used as well. Both a young Daniel Boone (age 21) and Daniel Morgan (age 20) worked in the area to plan and carry out the ill-fated assault.

When Fort Cumberland was all but abandoned in 1763, the Ohio Company reclaimed the land and put it up for sale. Eventually, the land was conveyed to James McCubbin Lingan in 1785, then to Captain George Calmes in 1803. Calmes built a mansion on the property. The land and home passed down through George Calmes' family through most of the 1800s. Late in that century, portions of the town began to be subdivided for housing and business use. In 1905, a group leased the Calmes Mansion and created the Potomac Club, which operated in Ridgeley as an important tennis and boating club until 1919.

In 1887, the West Virginia Central and Pittsburg Railway built yards and tracks in Ridgeley. In 1904, the West Virginia Central became the Western Maryland Railroad. The town developed as a blue collar community, many of whose residents worked for the railroad. For most of its history, it had been called alternately "St. Clairsville" or "Sinclairsville," but upon incorporation in 1914, it was renamed Ridgeley after Charles Ridgeley (1822–1897) a prominent early resident and businessman.

The town grew throughout the early part of the 20th century to be a vibrant blue-collar community of schools, churches and businesses. Serious flooding from the Potomac River was a challenge to the town until the Army Corps of Engineers completed a major flood control project in the 1950s. During the 1970s and 1980s, as the Mineral County Schools system consolidated schools in the area, all the in town schools were closed, challenging Ridgeley's cohesiveness as a community.

In May 2013 Ridgeley mayor James L. Twigg was indicted on eight felony charges in connection with the alleged misuse of the city's purchasing card. He pleaded guilty that October to four misdemeanor counts of failing to perform his duties.

== Notable people ==
- John Lookabaugh (1922–1993), American football player
- Grant Noel (born 1980), American football player
- William E. Shuck Jr. (1926–1952), United States Marine

== Sources ==
- Clites, Gary, Ridgeley and Carpendale, West Virginia From 1750: A History, Knobley Mountain Press, ISBN 978-1-4357-2044-2, 2008
