= Potomac State College of West Virginia University =

Public college in Keyser, West Virginia, US

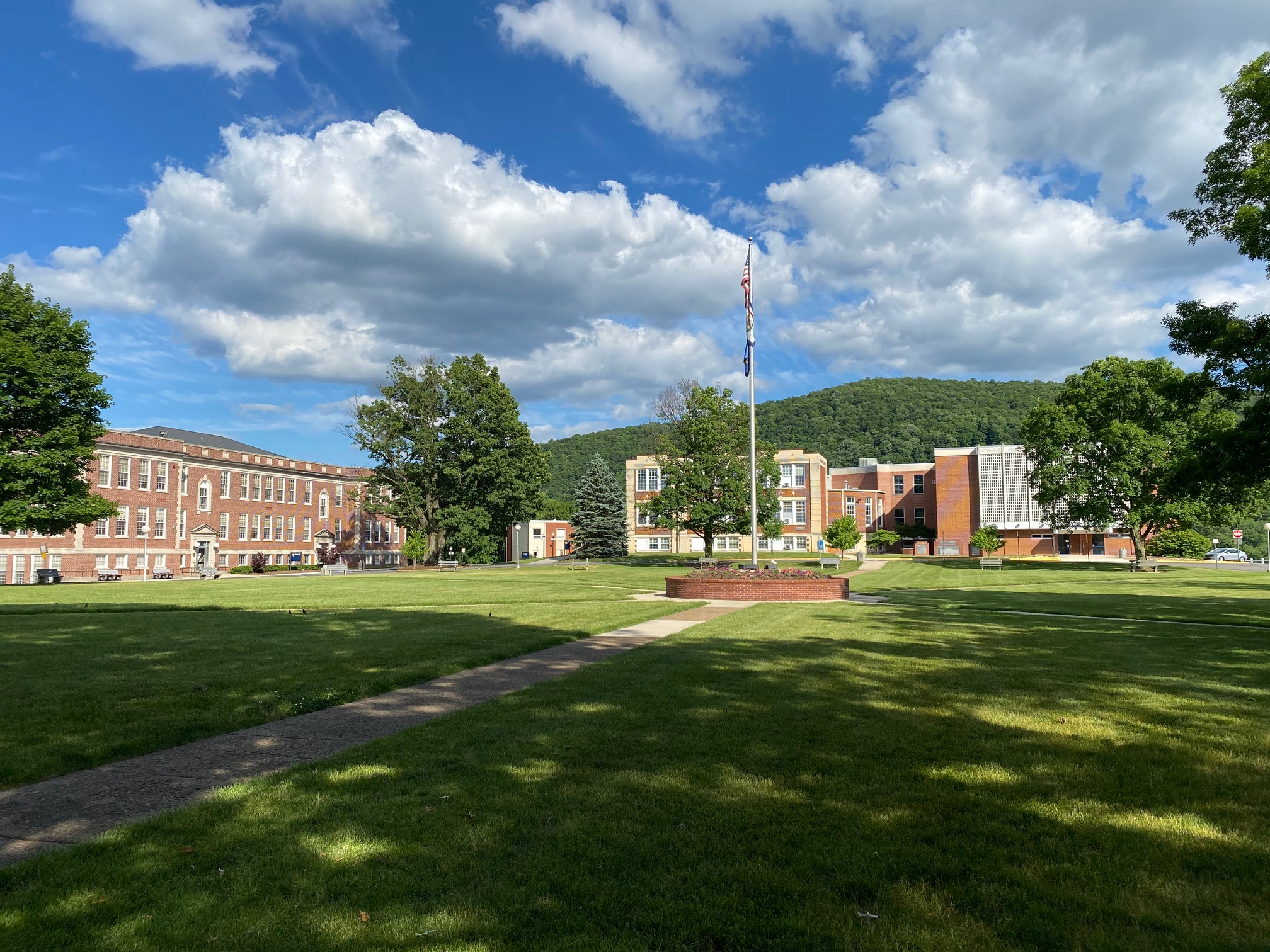
- Picture of Science Hall, Administration Building, and Academy Hall taken on the Quad.
- Other name: Potomac State College of WVU
- Former names: Keyser Preparatory Branch of West Virginia University; WVU Potomac State College
- Type: Public college
- Established: 1901; 125 years ago
- Parent institution: West Virginia University
- Accreditation: HLC
- President: Jerry Wallace
- Location: Keyser, West Virginia, United States; 39°26′19″N 78°58′56″W
- Campus: 915 acres (370 ha); Town, 18 acres (7.3 ha)
- Colors: Old Gold & Blue
- Nickname: Catamounts
- Sporting affiliations: National Junior College Athletic Association
- Mascot: Catamount
- Website: www.potomacstatecollege.edu

WVU Potomac State College is a public college in Keyser, West Virginia, United States. It is part of the West Virginia University system. Potomac State College is located approximately 90 miles (140 km) east of West Virginia University's campus in Morgantown, West Virginia.

The college, with an enrollment of 1,193 in fall 2020, offers associate of arts, associate of applied science, and Bachelor of Applied Science degrees along with the Regents bachelor's degree. In 2018, Potomac State College began offering West Virginia University’s Bachelor of Science in Nursing program on the Keyser campus with the first cohort of students graduating in spring 2021.

In addition to academic buildings, the campus includes two residence halls, a conference center, a performing arts center, a recreation center, a gymnasium and athletic fields. The college owns three farms totaling more than 800 acres (320 ha), supporting the only agricultural program in the region.

== History ==
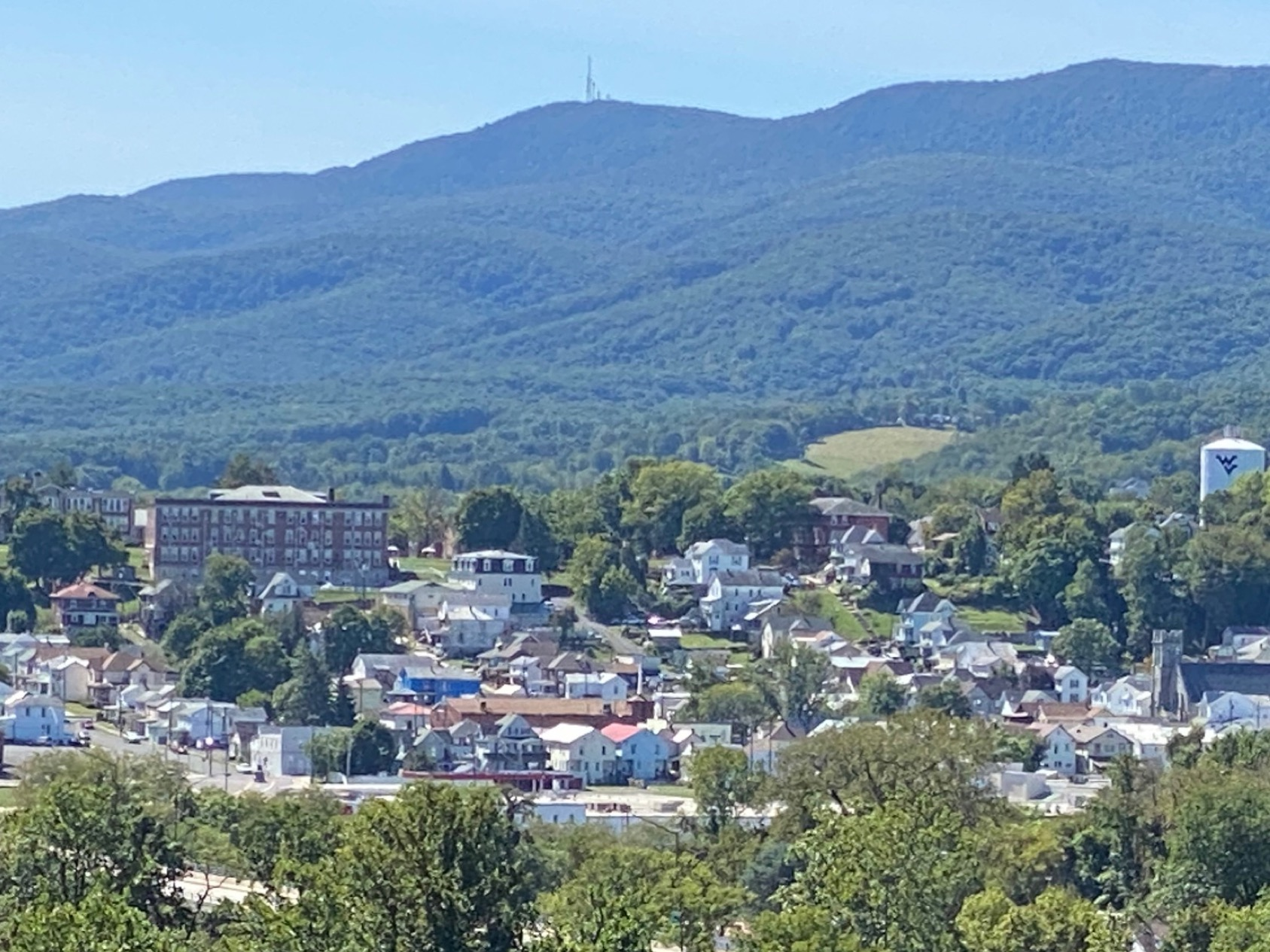
Potomac State College

At the urging of Mineral County member of the West Virginia House of Delegates, Francis M. Reynolds, Potomac State College was created in 1901 as the Keyser Preparatory Branch of West Virginia University, by an act of the West Virginia Legislature.

After receiving an appropriation of $20,000 from the legislature for the construction of buildings, Colonel Thomas Beall Davis, a local businessman, donated 16 acres of land as a site for the new school. That location, formerly Fort Fuller (also known as Fort Kelly), was a critical fortress in maintaining open roads leading to the South Branch Potomac and Shenandoah Valleys and in retaining Union control of the Baltimore and Ohio Railroad (B&O) during the American Civil War.

Once construction was completed on the multi-purpose building that would house offices, classrooms, a library, recitation halls and a gymnasium, the College opened its doors to 80 students in Fall 1902 as the West Virginia Preparatory School. Lloyd F. Friend was appointed principal and teacher and was joined by four other teachers.

In spring 1917, fire broke out in the multi-purpose building destroying most of the structure. Operations were moved to Davis Hall, named in honor of Thomas B. Davis, which was completed in 1916.

With appropriations from the WV Legislature, a new Administration Building was completed in 1919. That same year, the college purchased 129 acres of land adjacent to its property for its agriculture program.

After decades as a regional campus of West Virginia University, Potomac State College became an integrated division of the university on July 1, 2005. Many non-academic services at Potomac State have now come under the control of its main campus.

== Campus buildings ==
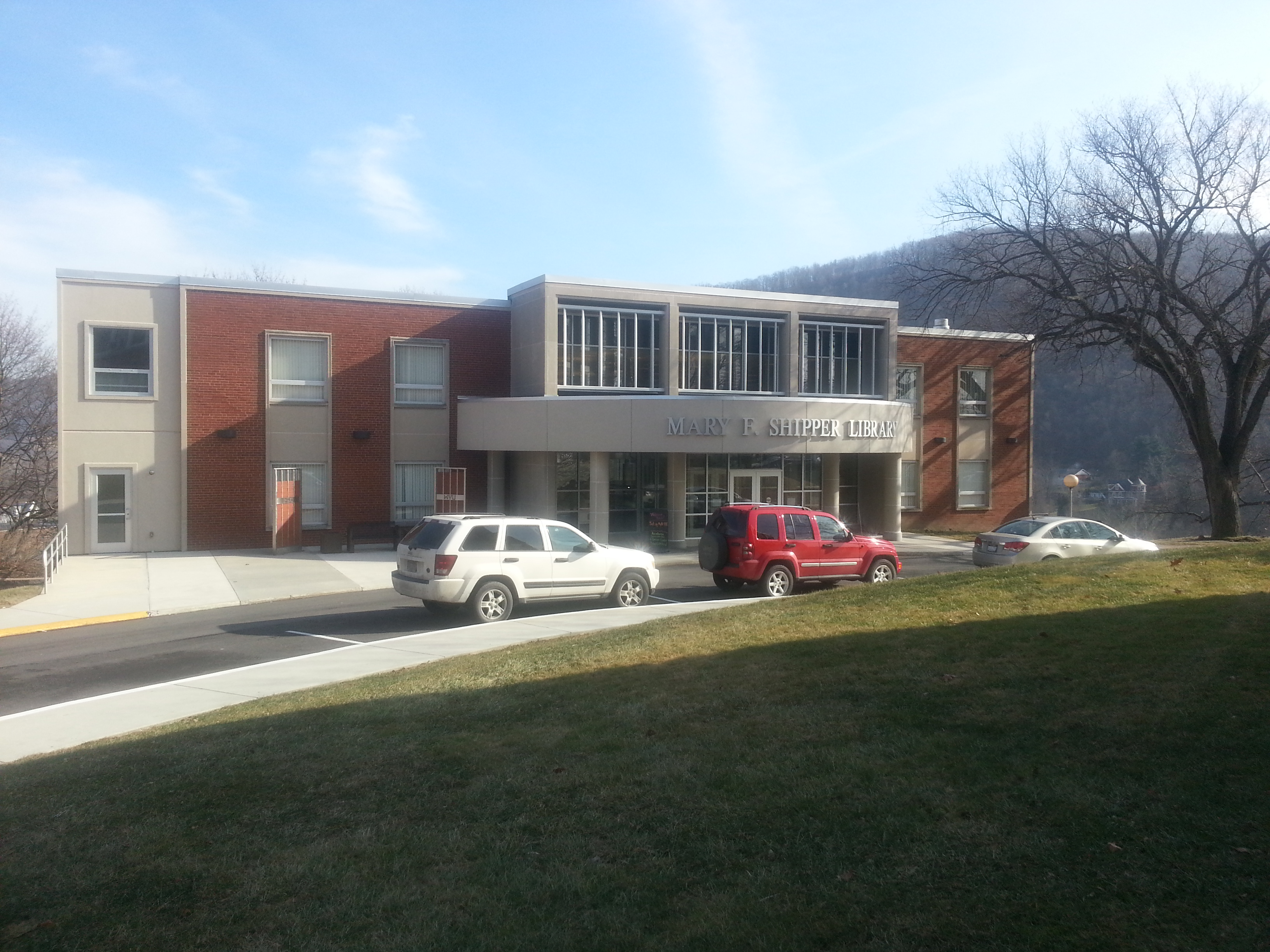
Mary F. Shipper Library

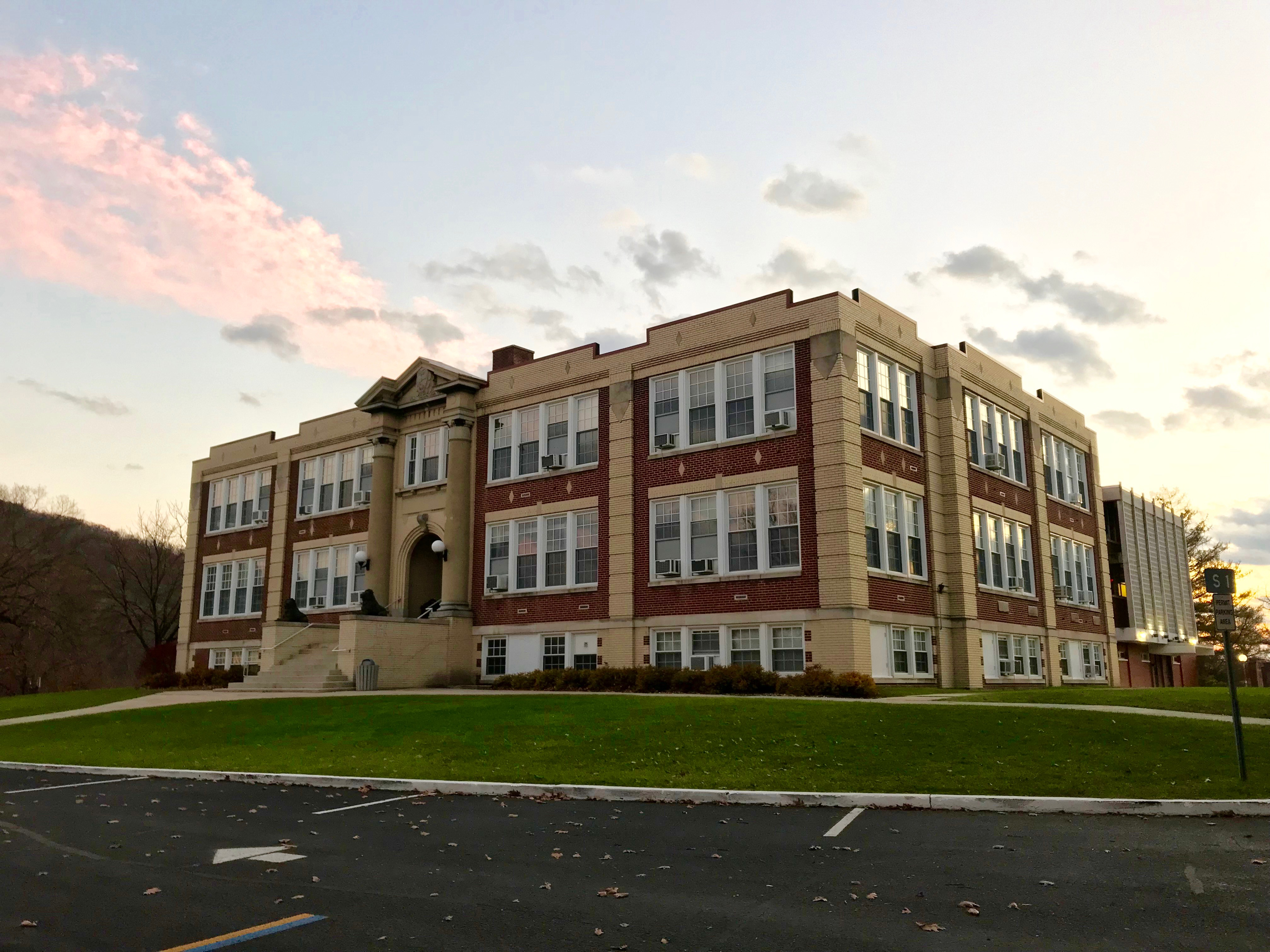
Administration Building

Reynolds Hall, completed in 1925, is named after WV Senator E. B. Reynolds, the son of Francis M. Reynolds. In addition to securing funds for a women’s residence hall and gymnasium, E. B. Reynolds was also instrumental in Potomac State becoming part of West Virginia University. Reylonds Hall was a residence hall until 2023, the building then was converted into offices.

Lough Gymnasium was completed in 1928 in honor of Coach Dana G. Lough. At the request of Joseph W. Stayman, who served as principal from 1912 to 1936, the WV Legislature renamed the institution the Potomac State School of West Virginia in 1935.

Mary F. Shipper Library was constructed in 1961. On October 16, 1976, the library was dedicated to Mary Fravel Shipper, long-time library director (1937-1973). It was the third library to exist in the college's history. The first was in 1901 and was located in the Administration Building which burnt down in April 1917. A new Administration Building was completed in 1919 with the library being located on the first floor. The library was then moved to its current building in 1961.

Science Hall, completed in 1951, houses laboratories and classrooms for the sciences. By an act of the WV Legislature, the school was renamed Potomac State College in 1953. Memorial Hall, a residence hall completed in 1957, was named in memory of the 41 former Potomac State students who lost their lives during World War II.

Friend Hall, a residence hall completed in 1962, was named in honor of Lloyd L. Friend who served as the first principal of the West Virginia Preparatory School. Academy Hall, which houses classrooms and offices, was completed in 1968. It was so named to recognize the college's academic heritage.

Golden Park, the college’s baseball field, was completed in 2002 and was named after the Golden Family, whose son, Bryan, was a catcher on the Catamount's baseball team. University Place, completed in 2007, houses students, offices, two dining facilities, study/social lounges, and a movie theater. The Indoor Riding Arena, sometimes referred to as the Equine Facility was completed in 2008. The facility houses the College’s American Quarter Horse herd and is used as a classroom and for equine and livestock competitions.

Catamount Place, which previously served as Potomac Valley Hospital, was totally renovated to become a residence hall, opening its doors to students in January 2013 and closing its doors in 2023.

The Recreation Center is in the J. Edward Kelley Complex named for Keyser, West Virginia, native and Medal of Honor recipient J. Edward Kelley. It was formerly used as the National Guard Armory until its closer in 2015. The J. Edward Kelley Complex opened its doors in January 2017.

Davis Conference Center a historic building on campus that once contained the college cafeteria many years ago serves as a conference center for the college and the local communities. The conference center was renovated in 2023. Church-McKee Arts Center contains a large auditorium and classrooms.

Starcher Agriculture Complex, named after former professor Don Starcher. Starcher worked at the college for 24 plus years. The complex includes the Ag Tech building, greenhouse, and a high tunnel.

== College farms ==
The college has three farms totaling more than 800 acres.

Gustafson Farm sometimes referred to as the Upper Farm is named after former Professor Oscar Gustafson who worked at Potomac State from 1956 until his retirement in 1988. The farm is 368 acres and serves as a mixed-use production farm and teaching lab. The farm houses the college's goat operation. In 2023 the college had swine on the farm.

Malone Farm, named after former Agriculture professor Kenneth M. Malone. The farm houses the college's cattle operation.

Dermer Farm, named after the Dermer Family who once owned the farm. The farm is used for hay and field corn production.

== Academics ==
Serving residential and commuter students, the college offers 62 degrees and is accredited as part of West Virginia University by the Higher Learning Commission.

== Athletics ==
Potomac State College hosts 10 varsity teams that compete in the National Junior College Athletic Association (NJCAA) and in the NJCAA Region XX, including: baseball, softball, men’s and women’s basketball, esports (co-ed), men’s and women’s soccer, women’s volleyball, and men’s and women’s cross country.

The baseball team competes on the NJCAA Division I level while the remainder of the programs compete on the NJCAA Division II level. Esports is not sanctioned under NJCAA at this time.

Their mascot is the Catamount, named for the mountain lions that once roamed the surrounding area.

Esports made its debut at the college in 2019, competing in League of Legends, Rocket League, Call of Duty, Madden, Rainbow 6 Siege and Apex Legends. The Catamount Esports program has earned various championships in the variety of collegiate leagues they participate in.

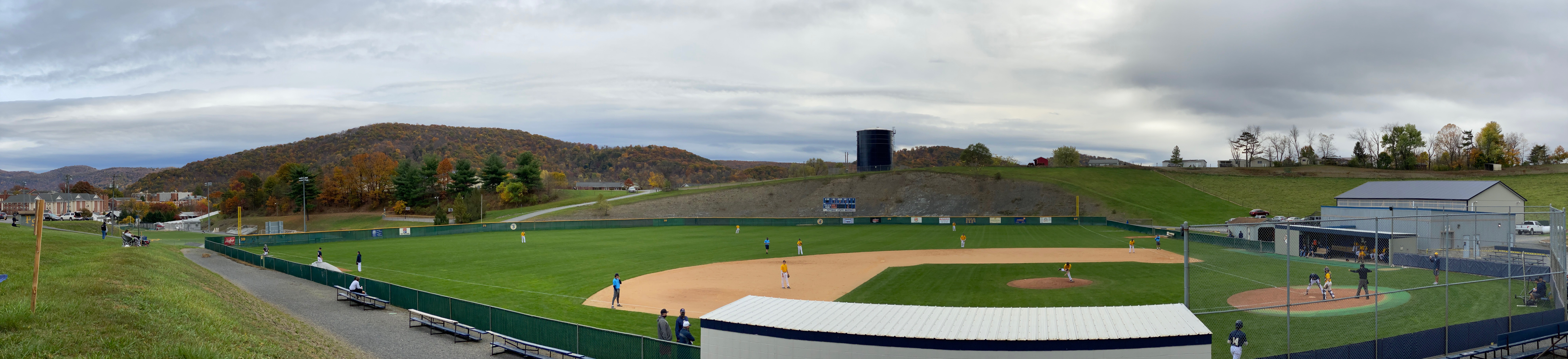
Golden Park baseball complex
- Baseball has competed in seven NJCAA World Series: 1993, 1994, 1995, 2004, 2005, 2006 and 2011; winning the National Championship at the 1995 JUCO World Series. Former Major League Baseball pitcher Dave Roberts was assistant baseball coach at Potomac State in the 1990s.
- Women’s softball has played in four NJCAA World Series: 2015, 2016, 2017, 2018, 2022, and 2023.
- Men’s basketball reached No. 1 National ranking during the 2018-2019 season. They competed in the 16-team NJCAA Division II National Championship Tournament in 2014 as well.
- Women’s basketball made trips to the National Championship Tournament in 2000 and 2007.
- Women’s Volleyball played in the National Championship Tournaments in 2016, 2017 and 2021.
- Women's Cross Country made team national championship appearances in 2022 and 2023.
- Men's Cross Country made their first team national championship appearance in 2025 led by runner Linwood (LJ) Sealey.

== Student life ==
The Office of Student Experience provides a wide range of activities, clubs, events and educational opportunities outside of the classroom. The college's setting in the Potomac Highlands of West Virginia offers nearby opportunities to hike, kayak, whitewater raft, fish, snow ski and snowboard.

== Notable alumni ==
- Ruth Ann Davis — American educator, academic, and PSC professor
- Henry Louis Gates Jr. — professor and director of the Hutchins Center for African & African American Research at Harvard University
- Gene Guarilia — professional basketball player
- Jonah Edward Kelley — Medal of Honor and Purple Heart recipient
- John Kruk — professional baseball player and sports analyst

== See also ==
- West Virginia University
