= Eric Moss =

American football player (1974–2019)

No. 79
- Position: Guard

Personal information
- Born: September 25, 1974; Rand, West Virginia, U.S.
- Died: March 10, 2019 (aged 44); Rand, West Virginia, U.S.
- Listed height: 6 ft 4 in (1.93 m)
- Listed weight: 315 lb (143 kg)

Career information
- High school: DuPont (Dupont City, West Virginia)
- College: Ohio State (1992–1994)
- NFL draft: 1997: undrafted

Career history
- Minnesota Vikings (1997–1999); Scottish Claymores (1999); Oakland Raiders (1999)*; Jacksonville Jaguars (2000)*
- * Offseason or practice squad member only

Eric Moss (September 25, 1974 – March 10, 2019) was an American professional football player.

Moss played college football at Ohio State University. He was an offensive tackle for the Minnesota Vikings in 1997 (but did not appear in a game), and then played guard for the Scottish Claymores in the NFL Europe League in 1999.

Moss was the half brother of Pro Football Hall of Fame wide receiver Randy Moss.

Moss died on March 10, 2019. No cause of death was given.
