= Bobbie Howard =

American football player (born 1977)

No. 52
- Position: Linebacker

Personal information
- Born: June 14, 1977 (age 49); Charleston, West Virginia, U.S.
- Listed height: 5 ft 10 in (1.78 m)
- Listed weight: 232 lb (105 kg)

Career information
- High school: DuPont High School (WV)
- College: Notre Dame
- NFL draft: 1999: undrafted

Career history
- Tampa Bay Buccaneers (1999–2000)*; Chicago Bears (2000–2003)
- * Offseason or practice squad member only

Career NFL statistics
- Tackles: 40
- Sacks: 0.5
- Interceptions: 1
- Stats at Pro Football Reference

Bobbie Allen Howard Jr. (born June 14, 1977) is an American former professional football player who was a linebacker for three seasons with the Chicago Bears of the National Football League (NFL). Howard grew up in West Virginia, playing for DuPont High School, the same school as Jason Williams and Randy Moss. He later played college football for the Notre Dame Fighting Irish and served as a tri-captain his senior year. He later was signed as a undrafted free agent with the Chicago Bears. Howard is now the defensive coordinator and theology instructor for St. Laurence High School in Burbank, Illinois. He was a high school teammate of Randy Moss. He later starred in the 30 for 30 ESPN film Rand University.
