= DuPont High School =

DuPont High School may refer to:

- Alexis I. duPont High School, high school in Greenville, Delaware
- DuPont de Nemours Private School, former name of the International School of Luxembourg
- DuPont High School (West Virginia), defunct high school in Dupont City, West Virginia
- duPont Manual High School, high school in Louisville, Kentucky
- P. S. Dupont High School, defunct high school in Wilmington, Delaware
