= Rand, West Virginia =

Rand
- Census-designated place
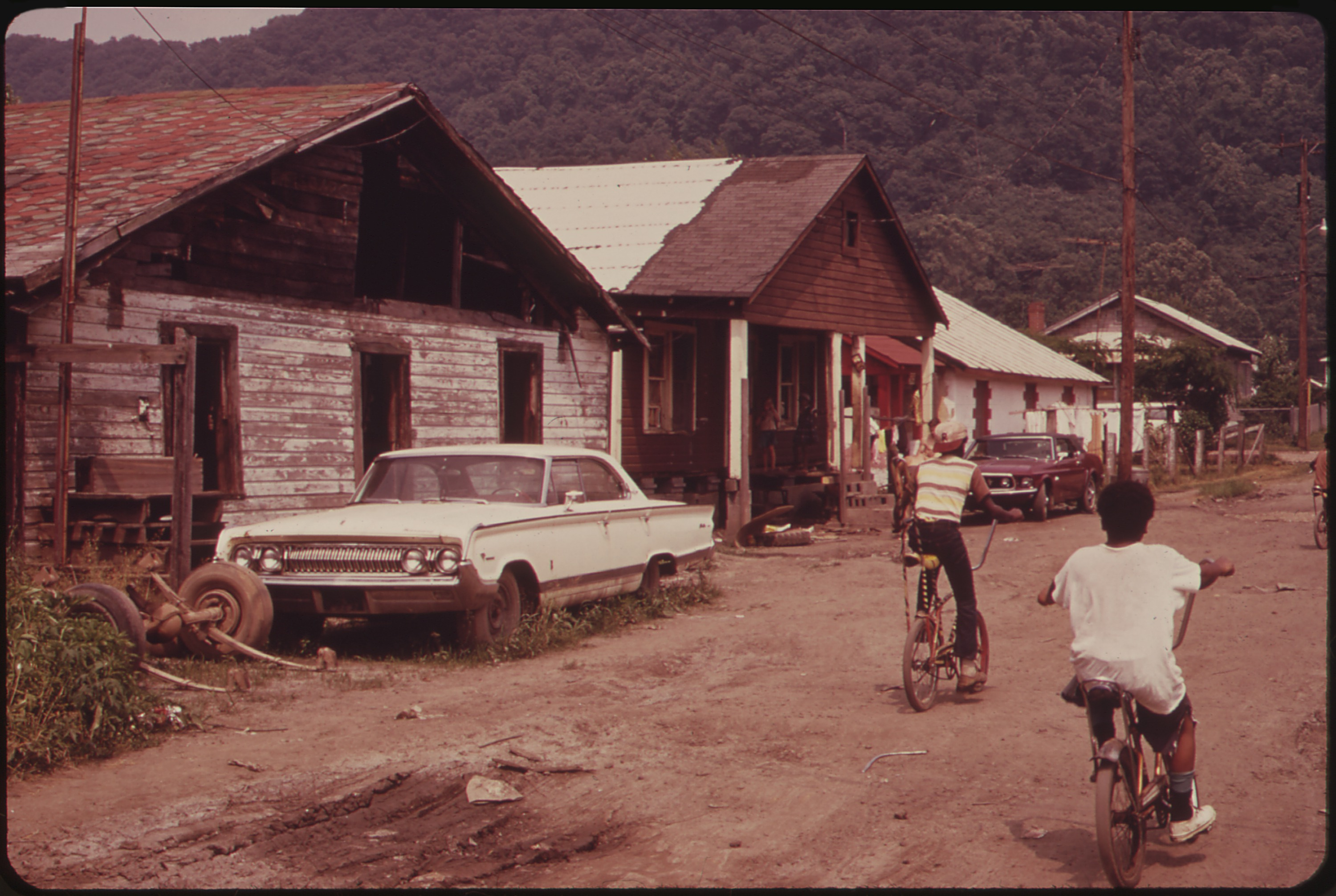
- Street scene in Rand in the 1970s

- Location in Kanawha County and state of West Virginia.
- Coordinates: 38°16′57″N 81°33′44″W
- Country: United States
- State: West Virginia
- County: Kanawha

Area
  - Total: 0.461 sq mi (1.19 km^{2})
  - Land: 0.461 sq mi (1.19 km^{2})
  - Water: 0 sq mi (0 km^{2})

Population (2020)
  - Total: 1,543
  - Density: 3,350/sq mi (1,290/km^{2})
- Time zone: UTC-5 (Eastern (EST))
  - Summer (DST): UTC-4 (EDT)

Rand is a census-designated place (CDP) on the Kanawha River in Kanawha County, West Virginia, United States. As of the 2020 census, its population was 1,543 (down from 1,631 at the 2010 census). It is surrounded by the communities of Malden and DuPont City.

== History ==
The unincorporated community within the historic Kanawha Salines area, was named after Plus Rand Levi, son of Mordecai Levi, patent holder of the Brick Road. It was originally named Plus from 1907 to 1909, when a large tract was purchased from the Dickinson family. Because there was a town already called Plus, the community changed its name to Levi. Around the 1930s or 1940s, due to a town in Braxton County being named Levi, the community changed its name again, to Rand.

== Notable people ==
Pro Football Hall of Fame wide receiver and ESPN analyst Randy Moss was born and raised in Rand. The ESPN Films production Rand University, which chronicled Moss' journey from Rand to the National Football League, was largely filmed in Rand.
