= Jason Williams (basketball, born 1975) =

American basketball player (born 1975)

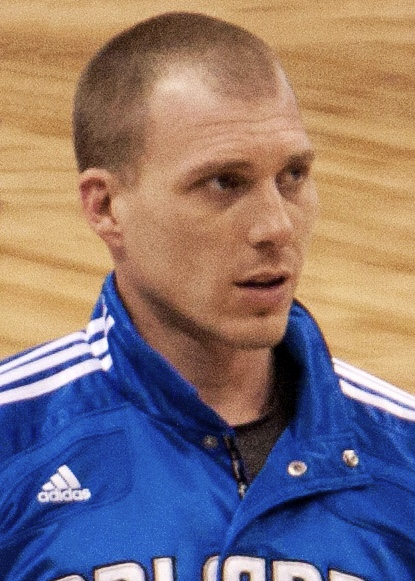
- Williams with the Orlando Magic in 2010

Personal information
- Born: November 18, 1975 (age 50) Belle, West Virginia, U.S.
- Listed height: 6 ft 1 in (1.85 m)
- Listed weight: 180 lb (82 kg)

Career information
- High school: DuPont (Dupont City, West Virginia)
- College: Marshall (1995–1996); Florida (1997–1998)
- NBA draft: 1998: 1st round, 7th overall pick
- Drafted by: Sacramento Kings
- Playing career: 1998–2011
- Position: Point guard
- Number: 55, 2, 44, 3

Career history
- 1998–2001: Sacramento Kings
- 2001–2005: Memphis Grizzlies
- 2005–2008: Miami Heat
- 2009–2011: Orlando Magic
- 2011: Memphis Grizzlies

Career highlights
- NBA champion (2006); NBA All-Rookie First Team (1999)

Career NBA statistics
- Points: 8,286 (10.5 ppg)
- Rebounds: 1,810 (2.3 rpg)
- Assists: 4,611 (5.9 apg)
- Stats at NBA.com
- Stats at Basketball Reference

Jason Chandler Williams (born November 18, 1975) is an American former professional basketball player who was a point guard in the National Basketball Association (NBA) for twelve seasons from 1998 to 2011. In 2006, Williams won an NBA championship as the starting point guard for the Miami Heat. Nicknamed "White Chocolate", Williams is known for his unorthodox, creative style of play.

A native of West Virginia, Williams played college basketball for Marshall University and the University of Florida. The Sacramento Kings selected him in the first round of the 1998 NBA draft. He also played for the Memphis Grizzlies, Miami Heat, and Orlando Magic. The Heat named Williams one of their top 25 players of all time in 2007.

== Early years ==
Williams was born in Belle, West Virginia. He attended DuPont High School (since consolidated into the current Riverside High School) in Dupont City, where he played high school basketball for the DuPont Panthers in 1994, and led his school team to the state championship before being defeated by Martinsburg in the final. He became the only player in DuPont team history to reach 1,000 points and 500 assists. USA Today named Williams the West Virginia Player of the Year in 1994. Pro Football Hall of Fame wide receiver Randy Moss was one of Williams' high school basketball teammates.

== College career ==
Williams originally committed to play college basketball for Providence College, but instead chose to attend Marshall University after Providence coach Rick Barnes left for Clemson. At Marshall, he played for coach Billy Donovan's Marshall Thundering Herd men's basketball team from 1994 to 1996. After redshirting his first season, he averaged 13.4 points and 6.4 assists per game during his 1995–96 freshman year.

When Marshall coach Billy Donovan accepted the head coaching position at the University of Florida in the summer of 1996, Williams decided to transfer and follow Donovan to Florida. After sitting out the 1996–97 season as then required by the NCAA transfer rule, he became the starting point guard for the Florida Gators men's basketball team during the 1997–98 season, and set a Florida Gators single-game record with 17 assists in a December 3, 1997 game against Duquesne. Through twenty games, he averaged 17.1 points, 6.7 assists and 2.8 steals per game, and led the Gators to an 86–78 upset of the Kentucky Wildcats in Lexington, Kentucky. In February 1998, the University of Florida suspended him for the remainder of the season for cannabis use, after two previous suspensions for the same infraction.

== Professional career ==
=== Sacramento Kings (1998–2001) ===
Following his suspension by the University of Florida, Williams decided to make himself eligible for the NBA draft. He was the seventh overall selection in the 1998 NBA draft by the Sacramento Kings.

In his rookie year, the Kings, with a roster that included newcomers Williams, Chris Webber, Vlade Divac, and Peja Stojaković, turned into a playoff contender. That year, Williams' number 55 jersey was among the top five sellers of all NBA players.

On July 20, 2000, Williams was suspended for the first five games of the 2000–01 NBA season for failure to comply with his treatment obligations under the NBA's anti-drug program. The NBA does not release details of violations of the anti-drug program.

On February 28, 2001, Williams allegedly shouted racist slurs to Michael Ching, a Golden State Warriors season ticket-holder, and to several other Asian Americans seated beside Ching during a Warriors game at the Oakland Arena. As recounted by a letter Ching sent to NBA commissioner David Stern, Williams retaliated against heckling made by Ching and his party midway through the first half.

The NBA eventually levied a $15,000 fine on Williams for cursing at fans. Nike decided to change a planned advertising campaign featuring Williams as a result of his alleged actions as well. Williams has since apologized for the incident.

=== Memphis Grizzlies (2001–2005) ===
By 2001, the Kings had concluded that Williams' behavior made him more trouble than he was worth, and general manager Geoff Petrie was concerned that Williams had not developed into a more complete point guard. In June the Kings traded Williams and Nick Anderson to the Vancouver Grizzlies—just weeks before the team moved to Memphis, Tennessee—for Mike Bibby and Brent Price.

With the Grizzlies on November 30, 2001, Williams scored a career-high 38 points and recorded 11 assists, during a 102-85 win over the Houston Rockets. The following season, in 2002, Grizzlies' general manager Jerry West hired Hubie Brown out of retirement to coach the team. The team improved by a franchise record 28 wins in Brown's first season.

After Memphis was swept by the Phoenix Suns in the 2005 Playoffs, Williams was involved in an altercation with Geoff Calkins, a columnist for the Commercial Appeal. Sources said that Williams screamed in Calkins' ear and took his pen away from him. Calkins had previously quoted Williams as saying, "I'm happy. I go home and see my kids and my wife and I'm OK. All of this [stuff] is secondary to me." Calkins was critical of the Grizzlies' lackadaisical play and had alleged that Williams did not care about winning basketball games. Williams was fined $10,000 for the incident on May 4, 2005.

=== Miami Heat (2005–2008) ===
==== Championship season (2005–2006) ====
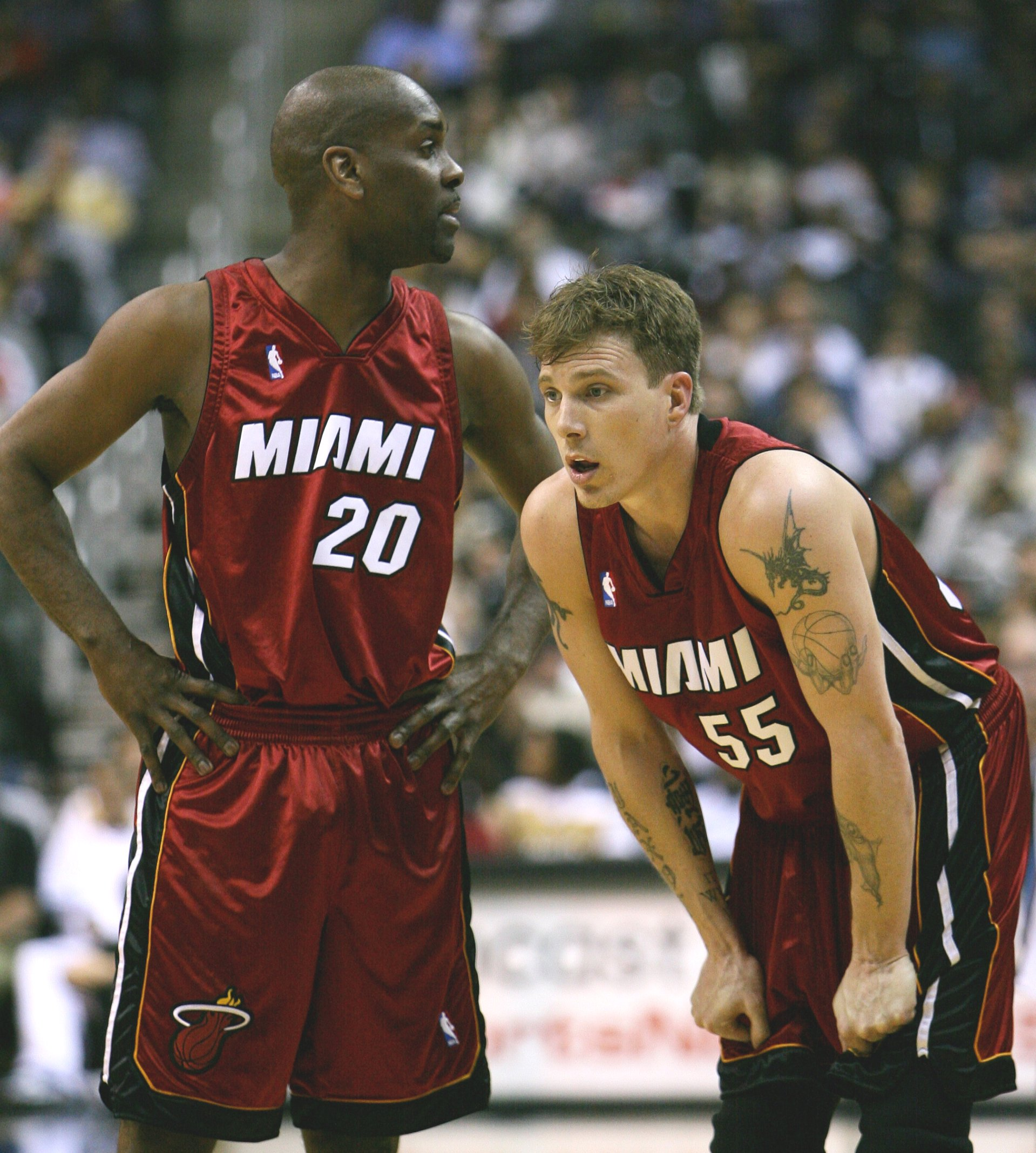
Williams with Miami teammate Gary Payton in 2006

On August 2, 2005, Williams and teammate James Posey were two of thirteen players involved in the biggest trade in league history that saw them being dealt to the Miami Heat in exchange for shooting guard Eddie Jones.

Williams started at point guard for the Heat in the 2005–06 campaign, playing a total of 59 games due to a knee injury but placing second only to Dwyane Wade in minutes per game. He was the third leading scorer for Miami averaging 12.3 points a game, only trailed Wade with 4.9 assists per contest and was one of three players on the team with over 100 three-point baskets for the season. In the playoffs his averages were lower than the regular season, but he scored in double figures 11 times in the post-season including 21 points on 10 of 11 shooting in Game 6 of the Eastern Finals against the Detroit Pistons. Miami closed out Detroit in that game and won the NBA Championship over the Dallas Mavericks, giving Williams his first and only title.

==== Dip in quality (2006–2008) ====
In the 2006–07 season, Williams was limited to 61 games, of which he started 55. He averaged 10.9 points and 5.3 assists during this season. Williams struggled in the postseason, averaging 5.8 points per game and 3.5 assists per game. His struggles contributed to the Heat being swept by the Bulls in four games in the first round of the playoffs.

In the 2007–08 season, Williams played 67 games while averaging 8.7 points and 4.6 assists per game. He shot 41.5 percent from the field, 86.3 percent from the free-throw line, and 35.3 percent from beyond the three-point arc. In March, he had 34 points versus Orlando, connecting on five three-point baskets. He had two double-doubles: one against Phoenix and one against the Bucks; both were 21-point, 10-assist performances.

=== Orlando Magic (2009–2011) ===
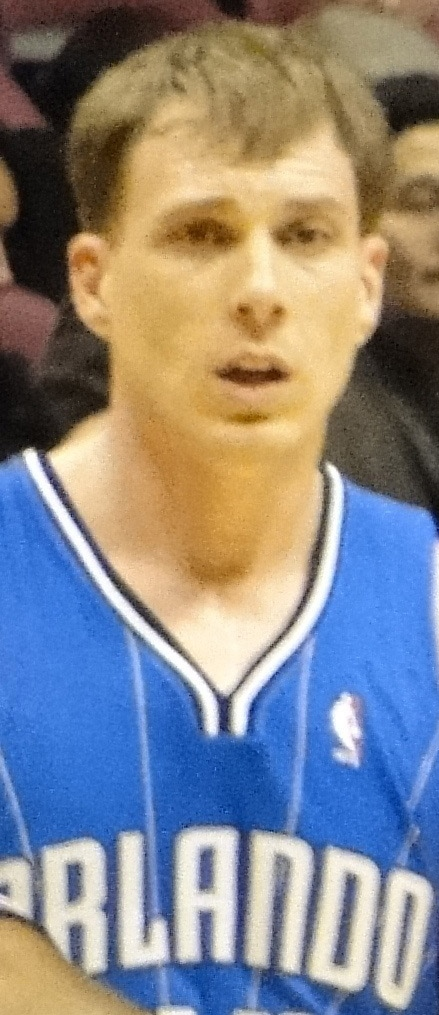
Williams came out of retirement to play with the Orlando Magic in 2009

In the summer of 2008, Williams signed with the Los Angeles Clippers to a one-year deal. However, on September 26, 2008, Williams announced his retirement from the NBA after 10 years due to persistent injuries.

In February 2009, Williams announced he would attempt a return to the NBA. On August 19, 2009, Williams signed with the Orlando Magic. The move reunited Williams with Stan Van Gundy, his former coach in Miami, who pushed the team to make the signing. Orlando is located just south of Gainesville, where he had gone to college.

Williams played in all 82 games for the Magic that year, including 18 starts when Jameer Nelson was injured. He also played in all 14 of their playoff games, as the Magic advanced to the Eastern Conference Finals, where they lost to the Boston Celtics in six games.

Williams re-signed with the team on August 3, 2010. On September 29, he had arthroscopic knee surgery, though he was still able to play the season-opener on October 28. After missing time due to injury, Williams was unable to crack the Magic's rotation behind Nelson and new acquisitions Chris Duhon and Gilbert Arenas. He was granted his release from the team on January 26, 2011.

=== Return to Memphis (2011) ===
Williams signed a two-year deal with the Memphis Grizzlies on February 7, 2011, returning to the team where he was their all-time assists leader (since surpassed by Mike Conley). The rest of the season was fully guaranteed, with a player option for the second year of the contract.

On April 18, 2011, Williams officially announced his second retirement from the NBA.

== BIG3 career ==
On February 1, 2017, it was announced that Williams would be playing in the 3-on-3 basketball league BIG3, on the 3 Headed Monsters with former teammate Rashard Lewis. In his debut he injured his knee, and missed the remainder of the BIG3 season as a result.

== Player profile ==
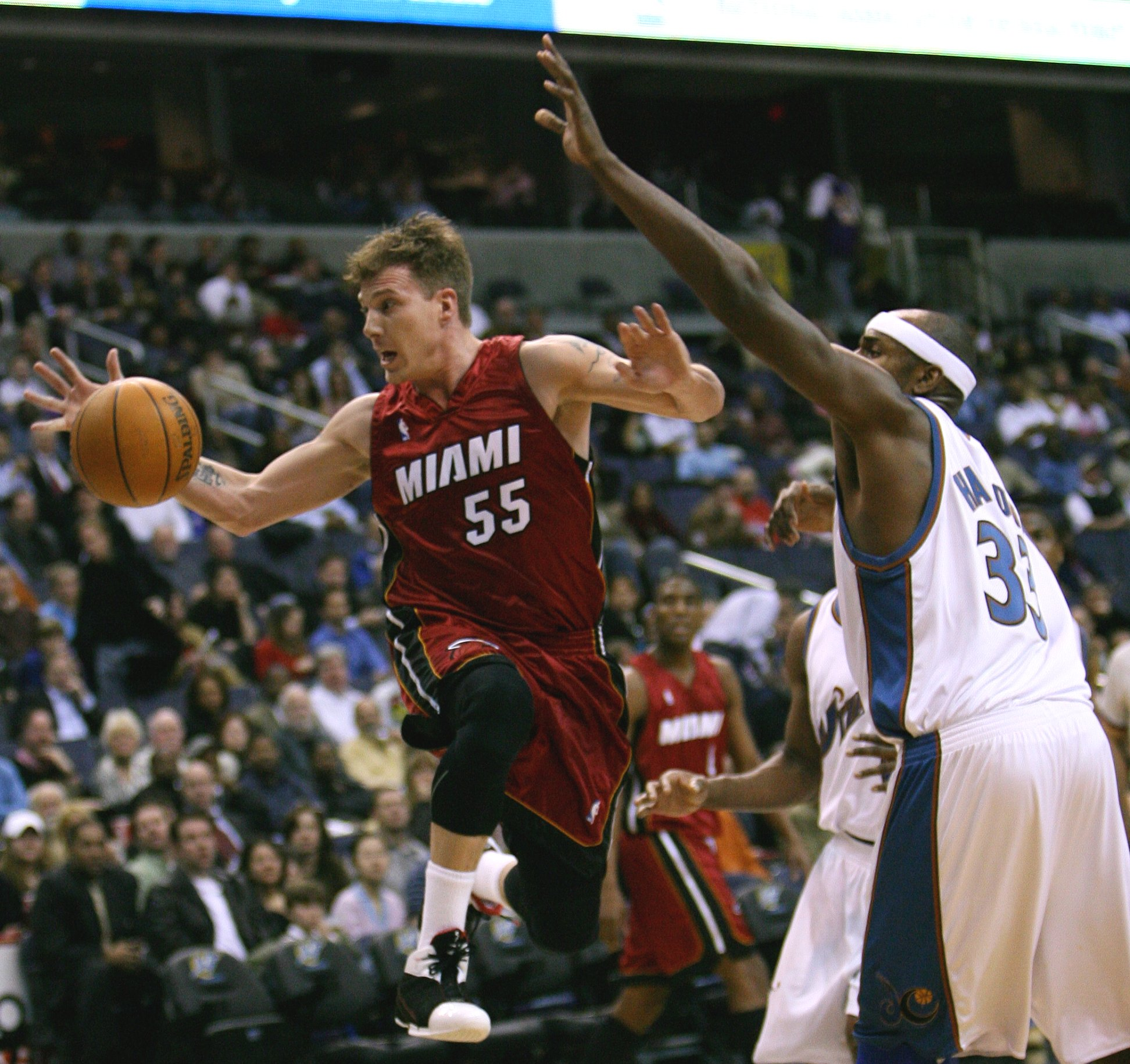
Williams with the Heat in 2007

Early in his career, Williams built a reputation for an unorthodox, creative style of play. He regularly made behind-the back, no-look and half-court passes. In his later years with Memphis and Miami, he achieved one of the highest assists per turnover ratios in the NBA.

In the Rookie Challenge of the NBA All-Star Weekend in 2000, in a fast break, Williams made a no-look, behind-the-back pass off his elbow to Raef LaFrentz. "I did it so you all wouldn't ask me to ever do it again", Williams said.

=== Nickname ===
Williams' nickname was "White Chocolate". The nickname was started in Williams' rookie year by Stephanie Shepherd, a media relations assistant with the Sacramento Kings. "I came up with that name because of his style", Shepard said. "He has flash and pizazz. The way he does things with the ball is incredible to me. It reminds me of, like, schoolyard street ball when I go to Chicago."

== Media career ==
Williams joined Barstool Sports in August 2025. He was originally a co-host of the Monday line-up of Wake Up Barstool with Dave Portnoy, but was removed after only a couple episodes as Portnoy did not think he was a good fit during football season. Williams then began hosting a new podcast at Barstool with Patrick Beverley and Adam Ferrone (Rone) called Hoopin' and Hollerin'.

== Personal life ==
Williams married Denika Kisty, a University of Florida alumna, a former member of the Florida Gators track and field team, and an All-American javelin thrower. Williams and his wife have three children. Their daughter Mia is a member of the Texas Tech Red Raiders softball team.

Williams is a close friend of former Miami Heat teammate and center Shaquille O'Neal; the two were neighbors in Orlando for three years. In 2005, O'Neal said, "I was the one who helped broker the deal this summer" of the five-team, 13-player trade that brought Williams to Miami. "He wanted to play with me and I wanted to play with a guard who loves to pass and I think it'll be a good combination for myself and [guard] Dwyane Wade."

Williams has a number of tattoos, which include a panther on his right arm, a dragon on his left arm (which was redone in the 2007–08 season), an eye on his chest of which he said, "It's why I pass so good, I have a 3rd eye". In the 2000–01 season, he had a wolf holding a basketball tattooed on his arm, and "WHITEBOY" tattooed across his knuckles. He also has his children's names on his forearms.

=== Social and charitable work ===
In 2003, Williams, when he was playing for the Memphis Grizzlies, along with Dr. Bob Wallace of the UT Medical Group founded the We Will Foundation, a charitable foundation to benefit children facing treatment for craniofacial deformities.

Williams was also a frequent visitor to St. Jude Children's Hospital when he was a player in Memphis, Tennessee. "I started going over not long after I got here," said Williams, who has always said he likes to be around kids. "I go see them when I can, and it's great to see their faces light up!"

== NBA career statistics ==
Legend
GP	Games played	GS	Games started	MPG	Minutes per game
FG%	Field goal percentage	3P%	3-point field goal percentage	FT%	Free throw percentage
RPG	Rebounds per game	APG	Assists per game	SPG	Steals per game
BPG	Blocks per game	PPG	Points per game	**Bold**	Career high
†	Won an NBA championship	*	Led the league

=== Regular season ===
Year	Team	GP	GS	MPG	FG%	3P%	FT%	RPG	APG	SPG	BPG	PPG
1998–99	Sacramento	50*	50*	**36.1**	.374	.310	.752	**3.1**	6.0	**1.9**	.0	12.8
1999–2000	Sacramento	81	**81**	34.1	.373	.287	.753	2.8	7.3	1.4	**.1**	12.3
2000–01	Sacramento	77	77	29.7	.407	.315	.789	2.4	5.4	1.2	**.1**	9.4
2001–02	Memphis	65	65	34.4	.382	.295	.792	3.0	8.0	1.7	**.1**	**14.8**
2002–03	Memphis	76	76	31.7	.388	.354	.840	2.8	**8.3**	1.2	**.1**	12.1
2003–04	Memphis	72	68	29.4	.407	.330	.837	2.0	6.8	1.3	**.1**	10.9
2004–05	Memphis	71	68	27.5	.413	.324	.792	1.7	5.6	1.1	**.1**	10.1
2005–06†	Miami	59	56	31.8	.442	.372	.867	2.4	4.9	.9	**.1**	12.3
2006–07	Miami	61	55	30.6	.413	.339	**.913**	2.3	5.3	1.0	.0	10.9
2007–08	Miami	67	53	28.1	.384	.353	.863	1.9	4.6	1.2	**.1**	8.8
2009–10	Orlando	**82***	18	20.8	**.444**	**.380**	.756	1.5	3.6	.6	.0	6.0
2010–11	Orlando	16	0	10.7	.342	.304	.000	1.4	1.5	.5	.0	2.1
2010–11	Memphis	11	0	11.3	.310	.200	.000	.7	2.5	.3	**.1**	1.9
Career		788	667	29.4	.398	.327	.813	2.3	5.9	1.2	.1	10.5

=== Playoffs ===
Year	Team	GP	GS	MPG	FG%	3P%	FT%	RPG	APG	SPG	BPG	PPG
1999	Sacramento	5	5	**32.6**	.356	.310	**1.000**	**3.6**	4.0	**1.6**	.2	10.0
2000	Sacramento	5	5	29.0	.375	.320	.800	1.6	2.4	.6	.0	10.4
2001	Sacramento	8	8	23.9	.426	.367	**1.000**	2.3	2.9	1.0	.0	8.8
2004	Memphis	4	4	32.5	.326	.286	**1.000**	2.3	4.5	.5	.0	10.8
2005	Memphis	4	4	28.5	**.528**	**.476**	**1.000**	2.3	**5.3**	1.5	.0	**17.0**
2006†	Miami	**23**	**23**	29.8	.405	.274	.844	2.0	3.9	.7	.0	9.3
2007	Miami	4	4	28.0	.250	.294	.800	2.0	3.5	1.3	**.3**	5.8
2010	Orlando	14	0	13.7	.342	.250	**1.000**	.8	1.6	.3	.0	2.6
Career		67	53	25.9	.393	.309	.889	1.9	3.3	.8	.0	8.3

== See also ==
- List of Florida Gators in the NBA
