= DuPont High School (West Virginia) =

School in Dupont City, West Virginia

Coordinates: 38°16′11.6″N 81°34′0.1″W

DuPont High School was a public high school in Dupont City, West Virginia, about 5 miles from Charleston. Built in 1961 and opened in 1962 it remained the home of the Panthers until closing in 1999 to consolidate with nearby East Bank High forming Riverside High School.

== Notable alumni ==
- Bobbie Howard, NFL linebacker
- Randy Moss (1995), NFL wide receiver
- Jason Williams (1994), NBA guard
