= Havlin =

Havlin is a surname. Notable people with the surname include:

- Jakub Havlín (born 1979), Czech bobsledder
- Moshe Havlin (born 1948), Israeli rabbi
- Sarah Havlin
- Shlomo Havlin (born 1942), Israeli physicist
