= Percy L. Julian Award =

- Date: 1975
- Country: United States of America
- Presented by: National Organization for the Professional Advancement of Black Chemists and Chemical Engineers
- Website: https://www.nobcche.org/percy-julian-distinguished-lecture

The Percy L. Julian Award was first given in 1975 by the National Organization for the Professional Advancement of Black Chemists and Chemical Engineers (NOBCChE). The award is given every one to two years. It honors black scientists who have made significant contributions to the areas of pure or applied research in science or engineering.

The award is named to honor chemist Percy Lavon Julian. In becoming director of research of a division in the Glidden Company of Chicago, Julian was the first African-American to lead a research group in a major corporation. He later founded Julian Laboratories, Julian Associates, Inc. and the Julian Research Institute.

== Awardees ==
- 2026, Vincent Ortiz, Auburn University
- 2025, Bart Bartlett, University of Michigan
- 2024, Guillermo Ameer, Northwestern University
- 2023, Squire J. Booker, Pennsylvania State University
- 2022, Dorothy J. Phillips, American Chemical Society
- 2021, Malika Jeffries-El, Boston University
- 2020, Thomas H. Epps III, University of Delaware
- 2019, Paula T. Hammond, Massachusetts Institute of Technology
- 2018, Bobby L. Wilson, Texas Southern University
- 2017, Olester Benson, 3M
- 2016, Goldie Byrd, North Carolina A&T State University
- 2015, Milton L. Brown, Center for Drug Discovery (CDD) at Georgetown University Medical Center
- 2014, Cato Laurencin, University of Connecticut
- 2013, Warren M. Washington, National Center for Atmospheric Research
- 2012, Carlton Truesdale, Corning Incorporated
- 2011, Theodore Goodson, III, University of Michigan
- 2010, Thomas Mensah, Georgia Aerospace Corporation
- 2009, Soni Olufemi Oyekan, Marathon Oil
- 2008, Sharon Haynie, DuPont Company
- 2007, Kenneth R. Carter, University of Massachusetts
- 2006, Jimmie L. Williams, Corning Incorporated
- 2005, James H. Wyche, University of Miami
- 2004, Gregory H. Robinson, University of Georgia
- 2003, Victor Atiemo-Obeng, Dow Chemical Company
- 2002, Victor McCrary, Johns Hopkins Applied Physics Lab
- 2001, John E. Hodge, U.S. Dept. of Agriculture, Peoria
  James Andrew Harris, Lawrence Berkeley Laboratory
- 2000
- 1999, Linneaus Dorman, Dow Chemical
- 1998, William A. Guillory, Innovations Consulting
- 1997, James H. Porter, Massachusetts Institute of Technology
- 1996, Edward Gay, Argonne National Laboratory
- 1995, Joseph Francisco, Purdue University
- 1994, Dotsevi Y. Sogah, Cornell University
- 1993, Joseph Grover Gordon, II, IBM
- 1992, Willie E. May, NIST
- 1991, Bertrand Frazier-Reed, Duke University
- 1990, Theodore Williams, College of Wooster
- 1989, James C. Letton, Procter & Gamble
- 1988, Isiah Warner, Emory University
- 1987, Reginald E. Mitchell, Stanford University
- 1986, George Warren Reed Jr., Argonne National Laboratory
- 1985, William M. Jackson, Howard University
- 1984
- 1983, Byron W. Turnquest, ARCO Petroleum
- 1982, K. M. Maloney, Allied Corporation
- 1981, James W. Mitchell, Bell Laboratories
- 1980
- 1979, William Alexander Lester, Jr., Lawrence Berkeley Laboratory
- 1978
- 1977, W. Lincoln Hawkins, Bell Laboratories
- 1976
- 1975, Arnold Stancell, Mobil Oil Company

== See also ==
- List of general science and technology awards
