= William Lester =

William Lester may refer to:

- Bill Lester (born 1961), American racing driver
- William A. Lester (born 1937), American chemist
- William Otis Lester (1864–1927), American politician and school administrator
- MS William Lester
