= David Kelly Campbell =

American theoretical physicist (born 1944)

- Born: July 23, 1944 (age 82); Long Beach, California, U.S.
- Education: Harvard College; University of Cambridge
- Scientific career
- Fields: High energy physics, condensed matter physics, chaos theory
- Workplaces: University of Illinois at Urbana–Champaign; Institute for Advanced Study; Los Alamos National Laboratory; Boston University
- Website: physics.bu.edu/sites/campbell-group/

David Kelly Campbell (born July 23, 1944) is an American theoretical physicist and academic administrator. His research has included high-energy physics, condensed-matter physics, nonlinear dynamics, and chaos theory. He has held academic and research positions at the University of Illinois Urbana-Champaign, the Institute for Advanced Study, Los Alamos National Laboratory, and Boston University. He served as director of the Center for Nonlinear Studies at Los Alamos National Laboratory, head of the Department of Physics at the University of Illinois, dean of the College of Engineering at Boston University, and provost of Boston University. He is a fellow of the American Physical Society and a co-recipient of the American Physical Society's 2010 Julius Edgar Lilienfeld Prize.

== Early life and education ==
Campbell was born on July 23, 1944, in Long Beach, California. He attended Harvard College, where he received a Bachelor of Arts degree in chemistry and physics, summa cum laude, in 1966. He subsequently studied mathematics at the University of Cambridge, completing Part III of the Mathematics Tripos with distinction in 1967. He received a Ph.D. in theoretical physics and applied mathematics from Cambridge in 1970.

As an undergraduate at Harvard, Campbell was elected to the Senior Sixteen of Phi Beta Kappa and shared the Sophia Freund Prize. In 1966, he was awarded a Marshall Scholarship to study at Cambridge.

== Career ==
After completing his doctorate, Campbell joined the University of Illinois Urbana-Champaign, where he worked as an instructor and research associate in physics and as a fellow in the Center for Advanced Study from 1970 to 1972. From 1972 to 1974, he was a member of the Institute for Advanced Study in Princeton, New Jersey. The Institute's records list his membership in its School of Natural Sciences from September 1972 to June 1974.

In 1974, Campbell joined Los Alamos Scientific Laboratory as a J. Robert Oppenheimer Fellow. He subsequently became a staff member of Los Alamos National Laboratory, where he worked from 1977 to 1992. From 1985 to 1992, he served as director of the laboratory's Center for Nonlinear Studies. He also held an adjunct professorship at the University of New Mexico from 1990 to 1992.

Campbell returned to the University of Illinois in 1992 as professor of physics and head of the Department of Physics. He remained department head until 2000.

In 2000, Campbell joined Boston University as a professor of physics and electrical and computer engineering. He served as dean of the College of Engineering from 2000 to 2005. He was provost ad interim from 2004 to 2005 and served as provost from 2005 to 2011. He subsequently continued his research and teaching at Boston University as a professor of physics, electrical and computer engineering, and materials science and engineering.

=== Editorial work ===
Campbell's editorial career has been closely associated with nonlinear science. He was the founding editor-in-chief of Chaos: An Interdisciplinary Journal of Nonlinear Science, serving from the journal's establishment in 1990 through 2016.

In 2015, he published "The pre-history of Chaos—An Interdisciplinary Journal of Nonlinear Science," describing the events and scientific activities that preceded the establishment of the journal.

== Research ==
Campbell's research has covered several areas of theoretical physics. His early work included high-energy and nuclear physics, while much of his later research has focused on nonlinear dynamics, condensed-matter physics, correlated electronic systems, and complex systems. His work has addressed solitons, polarons, nonlinear excitations, conducting polymers, superconducting materials, semiconductor systems, graphene, and the dynamics of nonlinear systems.

=== Solitons and conducting polymers ===
During the 1980s, Campbell conducted theoretical research on nonlinear excitations in quasi-one-dimensional materials, particularly conducting polymers such as polyacetylene. His work examined solitons and polarons arising from interactions between electrons and lattice distortions.

In work with collaborators including Alan Bishop, he studied soliton excitations in polyacetylene and their relationship to relativistic field-theory models. Other research examined polarons in quasi-one-dimensional conducting polymers and their structure and optical properties.

Campbell also investigated soliton energetics in Peierls-Hubbard models and nonlinear excitations in condensed-matter systems. His later research extended these interests to intrinsic localized modes and nonlinear excitations in solids and Bose–Einstein condensates.

=== Nonlinear dynamics and chaos ===
Campbell became involved in nonlinear science and chaos research during his years at Los Alamos. His work included nonlinear waves, kink and antikink interactions, discrete nonlinear systems, and chaotic dynamics. He was also involved in the development of the interdisciplinary community surrounding nonlinear science.

Campbell was the founding editor-in-chief of Chaos: An Interdisciplinary Journal of Nonlinear Science. He served in that position from 1990 to 2016.

His research has also included the Fermi–Pasta–Ulam problem, concerning the dynamics of nonlinear coupled oscillators. In 2005, Campbell coauthored a review of the first 50 years of research on the problem. His subsequent work has examined the Fermi–Pasta–Ulam–Tsingou recurrence problem and metastable states in related nonlinear systems.

Campbell's later research has also addressed correlated electronic systems, functional renormalization-group methods, graphene and other two-dimensional materials, and intrinsic localized modes.

== Awards and honors ==
Campbell received several academic distinctions while at Harvard College. He was elected to the Senior Sixteen of Phi Beta Kappa and shared the Sophia Freund Prize. In 1966, he received a Marshall Scholarship to study at Cambridge.

Campbell was selected as a National Academy of Sciences Exchange Scientist to the Soviet Union in 1977. His later international academic appointments included visiting professor at the University of Dijon in France in 1984 and 1985, Emil Warburg Lecturer at the University of Bayreuth in Germany in 1990, Toshiba Lecturer at Keio University in Japan in 1994, Deutsche Bank Distinguished Lecturer at the University of Frankfurt in 1994, C. N. Yang Visiting Professor at the Chinese University of Hong Kong in 1996, and Stanislaw M. Ulam Scholar at Los Alamos National Laboratory in 1998–1999.

Campbell was elected a Fellow of the American Association for the Advancement of Science in 1988 and a Fellow of the American Physical Society in 1990.

He later served as Gauss Professor at the Göttingen Academy of Sciences and Humanities in Germany in 2014–2015, and as a visiting scholar at the International Institute of Physics at the Federal University of Rio Grande do Norte in Natal, Brazil, from 2014 to 2016. He was also a Phi Beta Kappa Visiting Scholar from 2015 to 2016.

In 2010, Campbell received the Julius Edgar Lilienfeld Prize from the American Physical Society, jointly with physicist Shlomo Havlin. The prize recognized their contributions to physics and their communication of the significance of physics to broader audiences.

In 2020, Campbell was named a co-recipient of the Sigma Phi Prize in Statistical Physics. The prize is awarded every three years to three statistical physicists for outstanding achievements in the field. The 2020 award was presented at the 2023 SigmaPhi conference in Greece because of the COVID-19 pandemic. Campbell was recognized for work concerning the mechanisms by which microscopically reversible, non-integrable dynamical systems approach statistical equilibrium or remain in nonequilibrium metastable states.

In 2025, Chaos published a focus issue marking Campbell's 80th birthday and highlighting research areas associated with his career, including nonlinear science, chaos, localized states, and condensed-matter systems.

== Selected publications ==
- Bishop, A. R., Campbell, D. K., & Fesser, K. (1983). Polarons in quasi-one-dimensional conducting polymers. Le Journal de Physique Colloques, 44(C3).
- Campbell, D. K., & Bishop, A. R. (1982). Soliton excitations in polyacetylene and relativistic field theory models. Nuclear Physics B.
- Campbell, D. K., & Bishop, A. R. (1981). Solitons in polyacetylene and relativistic-field-theory models. Physical Review B.
- Campbell, D. K., Mazumdar, S., & DeGrand, T. A. (1984). Soliton energetics in Peierls-Hubbard models. Physical Review Letters.
- Campbell, D. K., & Schonfeld, J. F. (1983). Resonant structure in kink–antikink interactions in φ4 theory. Physica D: Nonlinear Phenomena.
- Campbell, D. K., Rosenau, P., & Zaslavsky, G. M. (2005). Introduction: The Fermi–Pasta–Ulam problem—the first fifty years. Chaos: An Interdisciplinary Journal of Nonlinear Science, 15(1).
- Campbell, D. K. (2015). Editorial: The pre-history of Chaos—An interdisciplinary journal of nonlinear science. Chaos: An Interdisciplinary Journal of Nonlinear Science, 25(9).
- Campbell, D. K. (2022). Mitchell Feigenbaum: His life and legacy. Chaos: An Interdisciplinary Journal of Nonlinear Science, 32(11).

== See also ==
- List of fellows of the American Physical Society (1972–1997)
