= Christine Grant (scientist) =

American chemist

Christine Sharon Grant
- Education: B.S., Chemical Engineering, Brown University (1984) M.S., Chemical Engineering, Georgia Institute of Technology, (1986) Ph.D., Chemical Engineering, Georgia Institute of Technology, (1989)
- Scientific career
- Workplaces: North Carolina State University
- Thesis: Surfactant enhanced electro-osmotic dewatering of mineral ultrafines (1989)

Christine Sharon Grant is an American chemical engineer who is the Associate Dean of Faculty Advancement at North Carolina State University. Her research considers surface and environmental science. She is the 2022 President of the American Institute of Chemical Engineers.

== Early life and education ==
Grant was born in upstate New York. Her father taught music and her mother taught science, and she grew up doing science experiments in her home and garden. Grant took part in the Program to Increase Minority Engineering Graduates (PIMEG) at General Electric, which first introduced her to careers in technology. She earned her bachelor's degree at Brown University, where she was in the second cohort of students to major in chemical engineering. As an undergraduate student, she was President of the Brown University National Society of Black Engineers. She moved to Georgia Tech for her graduate studies. She completed her doctoral research in 1989, during which she studied electro-osmotic dewatering of ultrafine minerals.

== Research and career ==
Grant studies the mechanisms that underpin fouling and decontamination. Her work investigates the chemical and transport processes that occur at the solid-liquid interface, and drive the formation and removal of deposits. Amongst the industrial areas considered by Grant are the removal of organics from glass, the removal of calcium compounds from stainless steel and the deposition of lubricants in disk drive assemblies. She has demonstrated that additives can be used to reduce the degradation and aggregation of lubricants at high temperatures. She joined the faculty at North Carolina State University in 1989. She was one of the first African-American women to be made a full professor of chemical engineering.

== Academic service ==
Grant has sought to improve diversity and equity in chemical engineering. She has been honored for her work as a mentor and educator. She was named the first Associate Dean of Faculty Advancement and Special Initiatives at North Carolina State University in 2008 and remains in the position. In this capacity, she started mentoring programs, oversaw initiatives to widen participation and created "Faculty Development Television", a professional development program for members of staff. Grant is the founder of STEM Resilience, an organization that seeks to support marginalized groups in science, technology and engineering.

Grant was for a time a principal investigator on National Science Foundation ADVANCE grants as well as advising or consulting with universities active within the program, including Cornell University, Texas A&M University, Lehigh University, and the University of New Hampshire. These measures sought to talk about institutional barriers placed among women within the world of STEM.

Grant has held leadership positions in the American Institute of Chemical Engineers (AIChE): she was the first African-American woman to be elected Fellow of the society and has served as chair of the Minority Affairs Committee and on the board of directors. She was elected president 2021.

Grant is also a director of the Broadening Participation in Engineering (BPE) and Historically Black Colleges and Universities - Excellence in Research (HBCU - EiR) programs at the National Science Foundation (NSF).

== Awards and honors ==
- American Association for the Advancement of Science Mentor Award
- American Institute of Chemical Engineers Pioneers of Diversity Award
- Fellow of the American Institute of Chemical Engineers
- American Chemical Society Stanley C. Israel Regional Award
- Winifred Burks-Houck Professional Leadership Award from the National Organization for the Professional Advancement of Black Chemists and Chemical Engineers (NOBCChE)
- National Organization for the Professional Advancement of Black Chemists and Chemical Engineers Professional Leadership Award
- American Institute of Chemical Engineers Pioneers of Diversity Award
- National Organization for the Professional Advancement of Black Chemists and Chemical Engineers Joseph N. Cannon Award
- American Institute of Chemical Engineers William W. Grimes Award for Excellence in Chemical Engineering
- Inducted into Sigma Xi Scientific Research Society
- Council for Chemical Research (CCR) Diversity Award
- Selected to participate in 12th Annual US Frontiers of Engineering Symposium by the National Academy of Engineering (NAE)
- National Academy of Engineering - CASEE Boeing Senior Fellowship
- National Consortium for Graduate Degrees for Minorities in Engineering (GEM) Distinguished Alumni Academic Award
- NSF Presidential Award for Excellence in Science, Math and Engineering Mentoring (PAESMEM)

== Selected publications ==
- Burns, Kathie; Wu, You-Ting; Grant, Christine S. (2003). "Mechanisms of Calcite Dissolution Using Environmentally Benign Polyaspartic Acid: A Rotating Disk Study". Langmuir. 19 (14): 5669–5679. doi:10.1021/la020815g. Wikidata Q105326720.
- Mousavi, Paria; Wang, Dianxia; Grant, Christine S.; Oxenham, William; Hauser, Peter J. (2005). "Measuring Thermal Degradation of a Polyol Ester Lubricant in Liquid Phase". Industrial & Engineering Chemistry Research. 44 (15): 5455–5464. doi:10.1021/ie049135u. Wikidata Q105326703.
- Hussain, Yazan; Wu, You-Ting; Ampaw, Paa-Joe; Grant, Christine S. (2007). "Dissolution of polymer films in supercritical carbon dioxide using a quartz crystal microbalance". Journal of Supercritical Fluids. 42 (2): 255–264. doi:10.1016/j.supflu.2007.03.011. Wikidata Q105326690.
- Decuir-Cunby, Jessica T.; Grant, Christine; Gregory, Bradley. (January 2013). "Exploring career trajectories for women of color in engineering: The experiences of African American and Latina engineering professors". Journal of Women and Minorities in Science and Engineering. 19 (3): 209–225. doi:10.1615/JWomenMinorScienEng.2013005769.
