= Soni Oyekan =

Nigerian-American chemical engineer

Soni Olufemi Olubunmi Oyekan
- Born: 1 June 1946; Aba, Abia State, Nigeria
- Died: 18 September 2021 (aged 75)
- Education: Yale University, Carnegie Mellon University
- Awards: Percy Lavon Julian Award, William W. Grimes Award

Soni Olufemi Olubunmi Oyekan was a Nigerian-American chemical engineer, inventor, entrepreneur, author, mentor and educator. Oyekan was the president and CEO of Prafis Energy Solutions, an oil refining and energy consulting company. During his career, he has been involved in both research and development and management at a number of major oil companies. He held patents and has made other contributions in the areas of chemical engineering, oil refining, and catalytic systems, including the publication of Catalytic Naphtha Reforming Process (2018).

Oyekan was both a Fellow and a Trustee of the AIChE, and has served on its Fuels and Petrochemicals Division and Minority Affairs Committees. Awards received include the William W. Grimes award from the AIChE and the Percy Lavon Julian Award from the National Organization for the Professional Advancement of Black Chemists and Chemical Engineers (NOBCChE). He was a mentor to many young professionals.

== Early life and education ==
Soni Oyekan was born in Aba, Abia State, Nigeria on 1 June 1946 and came to the United States to study in 1966. Soni completed his high school studies at St. Paul's College, Zaria, in 1963, and his advanced high school education at Olivet Baptist High School in Oyo, Oyo State in 1965. He is of Yoruba descent.

Oyekan was a recipient of an African Scholarship Program of American Universities (ASPAU) award which was administered by the Africa-America Institute (AAI) in 1966. The scholarship award enabled Soni to pursue his studies in Engineering and Applied Sciences with specialization in Chemical Engineering at Yale University. He completed his Bachelor of Science degree program at Yale University in 1970.

After his undergraduate studies at Yale, Soni moved on to Pittsburgh, Pennsylvania, and completed graduate studies in chemical engineering at Carnegie Mellon University. He was awarded the Master of Science (MS) degree in 1972 and the doctoral (PhD) degree in 1977. During this time he taught at the University of Pittsburgh.

His MS degree thesis title was on "The Stability of Low Tension Interfaces—Effects of layers of Discrete Dipoles and Charges". The title of his doctoral thesis was "An Infrared Spectroscopic Study of the Isomerization and Hydrogenation of Cyclic Olefins Over Zinc Oxide". He conducted his doctoral research studies under the tutelage of Professor Anthony L. Dent.

== Career ==
Soni Oyekan was the president and CEO of Prafis Energy Solutions. Prafis Energy Solutions is an oil refining and energy consulting services company. The company is located in Richmond, Texas. Prior to starting up his oil and gas processing consulting services company in 2013, Oyekan contributed to chemical engineering and oil refining with his inventions and studies on catalytic systems and the catalytic naphtha reforming process. His patents are used for enhanced profitability in reactor engineering and catalysis for the processing of crude oil to meet consumer demands for transportation fuels, heating oil, propane and butane gases. Dr. Oyekan provides his expertise as expert witness in litigation cases for oil refining history, oil refining and related waste management challenges.

Soni has over 42 years of experience in petroleum refining technologies and operations. He worked at the Exxon Research and Development Laboratory in Baton Rouge, Louisiana between 1977 and 1980; at Engelhard Corporation between 1980 and 1990, and DuPont between 1991 and 1993, leading research and development programs in catalysis and reaction engineering. After 1993, Soni moved into the management of oil refineries, with technical management assignments as senior consultant/corporate process technologist at Sun Oil Company (Sunoco)1993 to 1997; BP-Amoco, 1997 to 1999, and Marathon Petroleum Corporation, 1999 to 2013.

== Honors and awards ==
Oyekan has received several awards and recognition for his contributions in oil refining, chemical engineering and in the mentoring of engineers and technical personnel. He was a member of the AIChE Foundation Board of Trustees and was elected as a Fellow of the AIChE in 1999. He was active in the AIChE Minority Affairs Committee (MAC) and was honored with its Distinguished Service award in 2000. The Fuels and Petrochemicals Division honored him with its Distinguished Service award in 2002. Dr Soni Oyekan was named an Eminent Black Chemical Engineer at the AIChE Centennial Meeting in 2008. He was the recipient of the AIChE William W. Grimes award for excellence in chemical engineering and for the mentoring of under represented minority groups in 2008.

Soni Oyekan was the recipient of the 2009 Percy Lavon Julian Award. The Percy Julian award is the most prestigious honor given by the National Organization for the Professional Advancement of Black Chemists and Chemical Engineers (NOBCChE). The award recognizes and honors a recipient's scientific contributions and achievements, dedication to research, commitment to the educational development of others and passion for the chemistry profession.

Oyekan was also a member of the Foundation Board of Trustees of AIChE, and a member of Sigma Xi, Phi Kappa Phi honor societies, and of the Yale Manuscript Society. He was listed in the 2000 13th edition of Who's Who Among African Americans.

== Patents & publications ==
Soni Oyekan has 15 patents including 5 US patents and over 70 publications on a variety of topics in petroleum refining and catalysis. He has contributed over the years in numerous technical discussions on petroleum refining at the annual National Petroleum Refiners Association (NPRA) Q&A conferences. NPRA is now the American Fuel and Petrochemical Manufacturers (AFPM).

He is a co-author of "Catalyst Regeneration and Continuous Reforming Issues" with P. K. Doolin and D. J. Zalewski, in Catalytic Naphtha Reforming (2004). Oyekan is the author of Catalytic Naphtha Reforming Process (2018).

== Personal life ==
Soni Oyekan married Priscilla Ann Parker on 6 June 1970. Priscilla Ann graduated in the first female graduating class at Yale University in 1973. Oyekan died on 18 September 2021.
