= Letton =

Letton may refer:

Places in England

- Letton, West Herefordshire
- Letton, North Herefordshire
- Letton, Norfolk

People

- Charles B. Letton (c. 1854–1932), justice of the Nebraska Supreme Court
- James C. Letton (1933–2013), American organic chemist

== See also ==
- Levillain-Letton House, historic house located in Venice, Florida
