= James A. Harris =

James A. Harris may refer to:

- James Andrew Harris, American radiochemist
- James Anthony Harris, British philosopher
- James Arthur Harris, botanist and biometrician
