= Winifred Burks-Houck Professional Leadership Awards =

Science awards

Winifred Bucks-Houck Professional Leadership Award
- Awarded for: African American Women's contribution to science and technology
- Country: United States of America
- Presented by: National Organization for the Professional Advancement of Black Chemists and Chemical Engineers
- First award: 2010
- Website: https://www.nobcche.org/winifred-burks-houck

The Winifred Burks-Houck Professional Leadership Awards are rewarded annually by the National Organization for the Professional Advancement of Black Chemists and Chemical Engineers (NOBCChE) to recognize the contributions of African American Women in scientific and technological fields of study and work. The award is named for Winifred Burks-Houck, environmental chemist and the first female president of NOBCChE.

The award seeks to highlight achievements in science, technology, engineering and math; leadership; creativity; community service; and entrepreneurship.

== History ==
Winifred Burks-Houck was a notable leader in the NOBCChE having established its West Coast branch and serving as its first female president for four consecutive terms. She was credited with positive change within the organization such as the increase of its chapters by more than 100%, partnerships with other scientific and engineering-related organizations, increasing NOBCChE visibility and advancing the interests of Black chemists. Though Burks-Houck had died in 2004, the NOBCChE in 2010 decided to honour her legacy through the creation of the Winifred Burks-Houck Professional Leadership Awards and Symposium where recipients are recognized.

== Awards ==
The Winifred Burks-Houck Professional Leadership Awards are awarded to three categories of recipients: Professional Leadership, Graduate Leadership, and Undergraduate Leadership. Professional women in STEM who exemplify leadership while contributing to the community and students pursuing a degree in a STEM field are considered for this award. Distinguished Lecturers are the speakers at the annual Winifred Burks-Houck Professional Leadership Symposium selected based on their status as thought leaders on STEM and roles in leadership, organizational development, entrepreneurship, and other success enabling areas.

=== Distinguished lecturer ===
- 2010: Dr. Margaret E. M. Tolbert
- 2011: Dr. Mae C. Jemison
- 2012: Maggie Anderson
- 2014: Dr. Noreen Mayberry-Khan, “The Tox Doc”
- 2015: Dr. Pamela McCauley-Bush
- 2016: Dr. Tashni-Ann Dubroy
- 2017: Carroll A. Thomas
- 2018: Dr. Alveda Williams Dow
- 2019: Dr. Zakiya Wilson-Kennedy
- 2020: Dr. Christina Jones

=== Professional leadership awardee ===
- 2010: Ms. Sandra Parker
- 2011: Dr. Christine Grant
- 2012: Dr. Sharon Barnes
- 2013: Dr. Rashida Weathers
- 2014: Dr. Sharon Kennedy
- 2015: Dr. Jeanita Pritchett
- 2017: Dr. Maria Curry-Nkasah
- 2018: Dr. Connie Watson
- 2019: Dr. Zakiya Wilson-Kennedy
- 2020: Dr. Christina Jones
- 2021: Sharon L. Walker

=== Graduate leadership awardee ===
- 2010: Kari Copeland
- 2011: Tova Samuels
- 2012: Dr. Racquel Jemison
- 2013: Bria Dawson
- 2014: Alicia Bowen
- 2015: Dr. Ketura Odoi
- 2017: Dr. Treva Brown
- 2018: Dr. Viridiana Herrera
- 2019: Otega Ejegbavwo
- 2020: Sondrica Grimes
- 2021: Dayna Patterson

=== Undergraduate leadership awardee ===
- 2010: Sharon Patrice Anderson
- 2011: Kaetochi Okemgbo
- 2012: Dr. Trishelle M. Copeland-Johnson
- 2013: Dr. Edikan Archibong
- 2015: Ashley McCray
- 2016: Samantha Mensah
- 2017: Patience Mukashyaka
- 2018: Raven Richardson
- 2019: Jaquesta Adams
- 2020: Jordan Alford
