= Lilienfeld Prize =

American annual physics award

The Julius Edgar Lilienfeld Prize of the American Physical Society, to remember Julius Edgar Lilienfeld, has been awarded annually, since 1989. (It was not awarded in 2002). The purpose of the Prize is to recognize outstanding contributions to physics.

== Recipients ==
Source: American Physical Society

- 1989: N. David Mermin
- 1990: Michael V. Berry
- 1991: Daniel Kleppner
- 1992: Alan H. Guth and Claude Cohen-Tannoudji
- 1993: David N. Schramm
- 1994: Marvin L. Cohen
- 1995: Valentine A. Telegdi
- 1996: Kip Stephen Thorne
- 1997: Michael S. Turner
- 1998: Douglas James Scalapino
- 1999: Stephen William Hawking
- 2000: Robert J. Birgeneau
- 2001: Lawrence M. Krauss
- 2002: Not awarded
- 2003: Frank A. Wilczek
- 2004: H. Jeff Kimble
- 2005: Robert Hamilton Austin
- 2006: Mikhail Shifman
- 2007: Lisa Randall
- 2008: H. Eugene Stanley
- 2009: Ramamurti Shankar
- 2010: David K. Campbell & Shlomo Havlin
- 2011: Gerald Gabrielse
- 2012: Gordon Kane
- 2013: Margaret Geller
- 2014: Edward Ott
- 2015: David Awschalom
- 2016: David Pines
- 2017: Martin Rees
- 2018: Naomi Halas
- 2019: Katherine Freese
- 2020: Joel Primack
- 2021: William M. Jackson
- 2022: Chang Kee Jung
- 2023: Albert-László Barabási
- 2024: Edward Kolb
- 2025: Bharat Ratra
- 2026: Hitoshi Murayama

== See also ==
- List of physics awards
