= Sharon Haynie =

African-American chemist (born 1955)

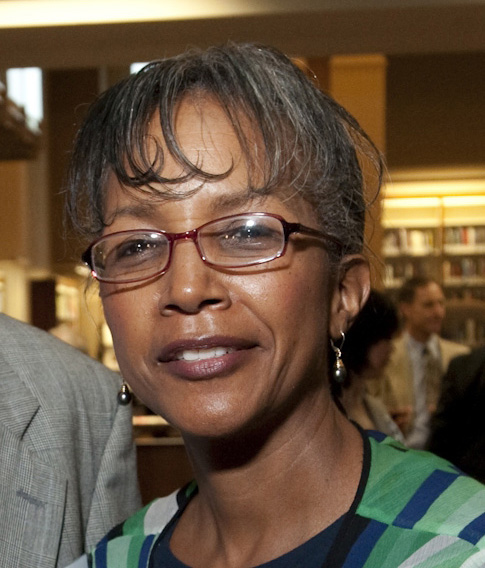
- in 2009
- Born: November 6, 1955 (age 70)
- Education: University of Pennsylvania B.A. in Biochemistry (1976); Massachusetts Institute of Technology, Ph.D. in Chemistry (1982)
- Known for: Green chemistry
- Awards: NOBCChE Henry Hill Award, 2006; Percy L. Julian Award, 2008
- Scientific career
- Workplaces: DuPont; University of Delaware

Sharon Loretta Haynie (born November 6, 1955) is an American chemist who develops biocatalysis for green chemistry. She is a Fellow of the American Chemical Society. Haynie was the first woman to be awarded the NOBCChE Henry Aaron Hill Award in 2006 and the first woman to win the Percy L. Julian Award in 2008.

== Early life and education ==
Haynie was born in Baltimore to Inez Penn Haynie and William H. Haynie Junior. She graduated from Western High School, one of the Baltimore City Public Schools, in 1973. In her eight grade she was part of an educational experiment, and taught chemistry at junior high rather than being introduced to it at senior high. This introduction to chemistry let her fall in love with molecules. She cites her mother and her teachers as her inspiration. She studied biochemistry at the University of Pennsylvania, and graduated in 1976. In 1982 Haynie completed her PhD at the Massachusetts Institute of Technology. When she was at graduate school, one of the male academics would not accept women students. After earning her doctorate, Haynie joined Bell Labs as a member of the research team.

== Research and career ==
Haynie joined the Experimental Section at the DuPont Company in 1984. At DuPont, Haynie worked on the research and development of environmentally friendly medical biomaterials. She was part of the team that created the product line bio-3G. In 1995 she began working on the production 1,3-propanediol. She partnered with Genecor, using metabolic engineering to turn glucose to glycerol and glycerol to 1,3-propanediol. She continued to work on the production of 1,3-propanediol, using microbial cultures and microorganisms. Haynie designed surgical adhesives made of polysaccharides that could be used to close wounds. She also worked on biocatalysis for green chemistry.

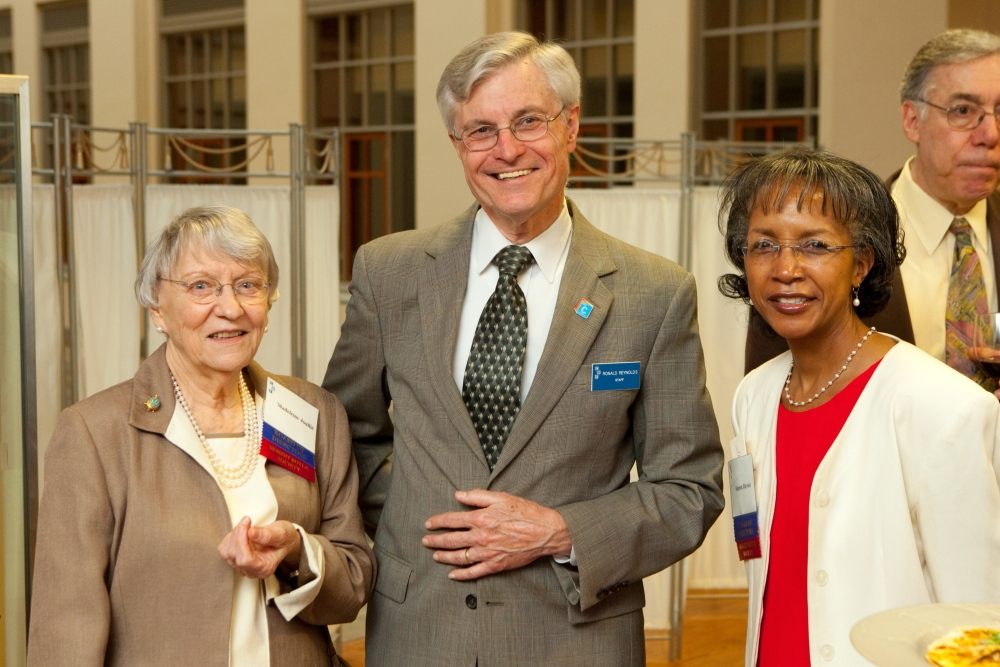
Madeleine M. Joullié, Ron Reynolds and Sharon Haynie at Heritage Day at the Chemical Heritage Foundation in 2010

Alongside her career at DuPont, Haynie was an adjunct professor at the University of Delaware. She has been involved with the American Chemical Society throughout her academic career, and is a legacy leader. She has acted as chair of the Philadelphia section of the American Chemical Society, and was part of their Women Chemists of Colour project. Haynie was the first woman to be awarded the NOBCChE Henry Hill Award in 2006 and the first woman to win the Percy L. Julian Award in 2008. She serves on the American Chemical Society Committee on Economic and Professional Affairs.

Throughout her career, Haynie has been active in volunteer work, mentorship, and community service. She has acted as a mentor for Project SEED (Summer Educational Experience for the Disadvantaged). Through SEED, Haynie welcomes students from minority backgrounds into her laboratory. She also reads science textbooks to make audiobook recordings for people with visual impairments.

=== Awards and honours ===
- 2003 United States Environmental Protection Agency Presidential Green Chemistry Award
- 2006 American Chemical Society/NOBCChE Northeast Section Henry Hill Award
- 2008 National Organization for the Professional Advancement of Black Chemists and Chemical Engineers Percy L Julian Award
- 2016 American Chemical Society Fellow
