= Winifred Burks-Houck =

Environmental organic chemist

- Born: August 20, 1950; Anniston, Alabama
- Died: May 6, 2004 (aged 53)
- Education: Dillard University (BA); Atlanta University (MS)
- Occupation: Environmental chemist

Winifred Burks-Houck (August 20, 1950 – May 6, 2004) was an environmental organic chemist and the first female president of National Organization for the Professional Advancement of Black Chemists and Chemical Engineers (NOBCChE), serving from 1993 – 2001.

== Personal life ==
Winifred Burks-Houck was born on August 20, 1950, in Anniston, Alabama, the daughter of Mary Emma Goodson-Burks and Matthew Burks. She was the great, great, great-granddaughter of abolitionist Harriet Tubman.

Burks-Houck pledged as a member of the Delta Sigma Theta sorority as an undergraduate student at Dillard University. She served in various leadership roles during her time in alumnae chapter, holding positions as the president from 1987 – 1989, vice-president and chair of fundraising. In honor of her scientific work, Burks-Houck was named a Project Cherish Honoree at Delta Sigma Theta's 43rd annual national convention.

== Education ==
Burks-Houck began her education in Anniston, Alabama, having attended both elementary and high school in the city. Burks-Houck continued her education and earned a Bachelor of Arts degree in chemistry from Dillard University followed by a Master of Science Degree in Organic Chemistry from Atlanta University.

== Career ==
In 1983, Burks-Houck joined Lawrence Livermore National Laboratory, working as an environmental chemist on environmental protection projects with an interest in ensuring worker safety.

=== National Organization for the Professional Advancement of Black Chemists and Chemical Engineers (NOBCChE) ===
Burks-Houck was dedicated to the establishment of the NOBCChE on the West Coast and its national endeavours. She represented NOBCChE in Dakar, Senegal, delivering a presentation titled: "Environmental Applications and Regulatory Reporting". Starting in 1984, she worked for the San Francisco Bay Area Chapter, running development events for both professional and educational audiences. In 1991, Burks-Houck was elected as national vice president, and was elected president in 1993, becoming the first female president. Burks-Houck served as president for four terms until 2001. She worked to modernize the organization's computer systems and established new scholarships and she is credited with doubling the number of professional and student chapters. Burks-Houck was also credited with building partnerships with other organizations such as the American Association for the Advancement of Science (AAAS), American Chemical Society (ACS), American Indian Science and Engineering Alliance, National Aeronautics and Space Administration (NASA), and the Society for the Advancement of Chicanos and Native Americans in Science (SACNAS).

== Death and legacy ==
Burks-Houck died on May 6, 2004.

In 2010, the NOBCChE created the Winifred Burks-Houck Professional Leadership Awards and Symposium. This award is given for outstanding work in the fields of science and technology to African American women.
