= Isiah Warner =

American analytical chemist

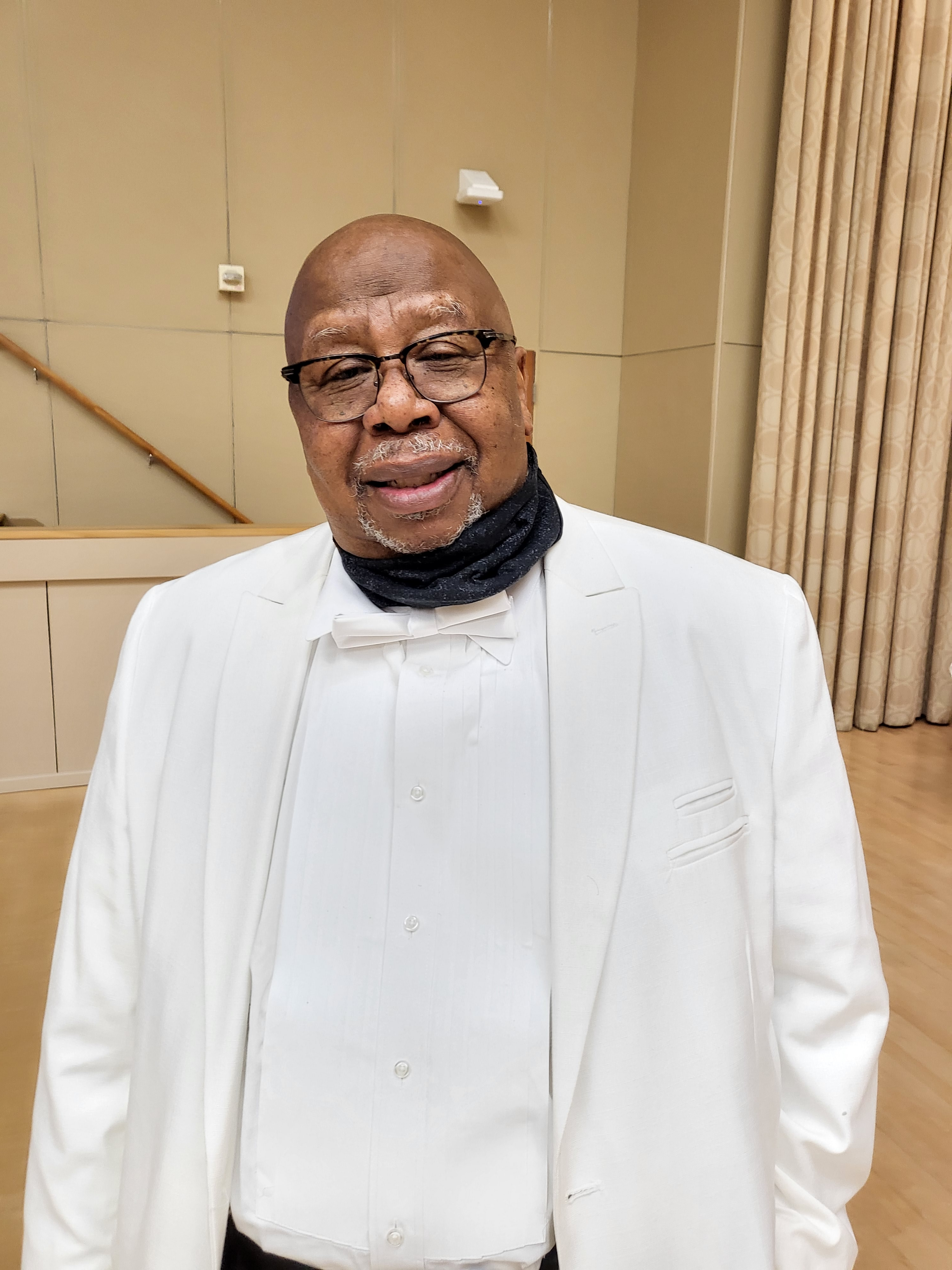
- Isiah Warner at Career Celebration
- Born: 20 July 1946 (age 80); Bunkie, Louisiana
- Education: Southern University; University of Washington
- Scientific career
- Workplaces: Louisiana State University; Emory University; Texas A&M University
- Thesis: Video fluorometry: a novel approach to the acquisition and interpretation of multicomponent fluorescence data (1977)

Isiah Manuel Warner (born July 20, 1946) is the Boyd and Phillip W. West Professor of Surface and Analytical Chemistry and the Vice President for Strategic Initiatives at Louisiana State University. He’s also a professor at the Howard Hughes Medical Institute. Warner has won numerous national and international awards for chemistry and mentoring of students in the sciences. He has published over 350 refereed publications and has several patents.

== Biography ==
Isiah Warner was born in Bunkie, Louisiana in 1946. He is a graduate of Southern University where he received his BS degree in chemistry. Warner received his doctorate in Analytical Chemistry from the University of Washington in 1977. Following a post-doctoral research experience, Warner started his academic career at Texas A&M University where he was the first African American Chemistry faculty, and where received tenure and promotion to associate professor. Following receipt of tenure and promotion, Warner moved his research laboratory to Emory University and was promoted to full professor in 1986. In 1992, Warner returned to Louisiana and serves as the Phillip W. West Professor of Surface and Analytical Chemistry at Louisiana State University. He retired as Professor Emeritus in December 2021, with his most recent role being the Vice President of Strategic Initiatives at LSU and serves as a Howard Hughes Medical Institute Professor.

Warner received an honorary doctorate from Marquette University. He has been recognized for his chemical research and mentoring. Warner was named a fellow of the American Chemical Society in 2009. He is a recipient of the NOBCChE Percy L. Julian Award.

== Research and Mentoring ==
Warner is an analytical/materials Chemist, with research focuses on fluorescence spectroscopy, organized media, and ionic liquid chemistry, particularly as applied to solid phase materials. He is known for his mentoring of Chemistry students, and focus on the advancement of women and chemists of color. He has won numerous awards for his mentoring including. He has graduated 67 PhD students from his group, including a significant number of women and minorities, helping to make Louisiana State University the leader in producing women and African American PhD students.

== Personal life ==
Warner was born in 1946 in DeQuincy, Louisiana to Humphrey and Erma Warner. His interest in science started young, when he conducted his first experiment by drinking kerosene to see why it created light. He and his wife, Della Blount Warner, have three children: Isiah Jr., Edward and Chideha.

== Honours, decorations, awards and distinctions ==
- 1997: Presidential Award for Excellence in Science, Mathematics, and Engineering Mentoring
- 1988: Percy L. Julian Award
- 2000: LSU Distinguished Faculty Award
- 2000: CASE Louisiana Teacher of the Year Award
- 2004: University of Washington, College of Arts & Sciences, Distinguished Alumnus Award
- 2005: Tuskegee University George Washington Carver Achievement Award
- 2005: Charles E. Coates Award – ACS local section
- 2005: Marquette University, honorary Doctor of Science degree
- 2007: Association of Analytical Chemists (Anachem) Award
- 2008: ACS Division of Analytical Chemistry Award in Spectrochemical Analysis
- 2009: American Chemical Society Fellow – Inaugural Class
- 2010: Society for Applied Spectroscopy (SAS) Fellow
- 2013: American Chemical Society Award in Analytical Chemistry
- 2014: Stanley C. Israel Regional Award for Advancing Diversity in Chemical Sciences (ACS), November 19, 2013
- 2014: American Chemical Society (ACS) Division of Professional Relations Henry Hill Award for Outstanding Contributions to Professionalism
- 2014: Oesper Award
- 2015: Iddles Lectureship
- 2016: American Academy of Arts and Sciences Member
- 2016: SEC Professor of the Year
- 2018: Nature Award for Mentoring in Science.

== Selected bibliography ==
- Wang, Weihua; Rusin, Oleksandr; Xu, Xiangyang; Kim, Kyu Kwang; Escobedo, Jorge O.; Fakayode, Sayo O.; Fletcher, Kristin A.; Lowry, Mark; Schowalter, Corin M.; Lawrence, Candace M.; Fronczek, Frank R.; Warner, Isiah M.; Strongin, Robert M. (November 2005). "Detection of Homocysteine and Cysteine". Journal of the American Chemical Society. 127 (45): 15949–15958. Bibcode:2005JAChS.12715949W. doi:10.1021/ja054962n. PMC 3386615. PMID 16277539.
- Warner, I. M.; Christian, G. D.; Davidson, E. R.; Callis, J. B. (May 2002). "Analysis of multicomponent fluorescence data". Analytical Chemistry. 49 (4): 564–573. doi:10.1021/ac50012a016.
- Anderson, W. A.; Banerjee, U.; Drennan, C. L.; Elgin, S. C. R.; Epstein, I. R.; Handelsman, J.; Hatfull, G. F.; Losick, R.; O'Dowd, D. K.; Olivera, B. M.; Strobel, S. A.; Walker, G. C.; Warner, I. M. (13 January 2011). "Changing the Culture of Science Education at Research Universities". Science. 331 (6014): 152–153. Bibcode:2011Sci...331..152A. doi:10.1126/science.1198280. PMID 21233371. S2CID 40736715.
- Regmi, Bishnu P.; Monk, Joshua; El-Zahab, Bilal; Das, Susmita; Hung, Francisco R.; Hayes, Daniel J.; Warner, Isiah M. (2012). "A novel composite film for detection and molecular weight determination of organic vapors". Journal of Materials Chemistry. 22 (27): 13732. doi:10.1039/C2JM31623D.
- Regmi, Bishnu P.; Galpothdeniya, Waduge Indika S.; Siraj, Noureen; Webb, Marc H.; Speller, Nicholas C.; Warner, Isiah M. (March 2015). "Phthalocyanine- and porphyrin-based GUMBOS for rapid and sensitive detection of organic vapors". Sensors and Actuators B: Chemical. 209: 172–179. Bibcode:2015SeAcB.209..172R. doi:10.1016/j.snb.2014.11.068.
- Galpothdeniya, Waduge Indika S.; Regmi, Bishnu P.; McCarter, Kevin S.; de Rooy, Sergio L.; Siraj, Noureen; Warner, Isiah M. (9 April 2015). "Virtual Colorimetric Sensor Array: Single Ionic Liquid for Solvent Discrimination". Analytical Chemistry. 87 (8): 4464–4471. doi:10.1021/acs.analchem.5b00714. PMID 25822878.
- Magut, Paul K. S.; Das, Susmita; Fernand, Vivian E.; Losso, Jack; McDonough, Karen; Naylor, Brittni M.; Aggarwal, Sita; Warner, Isiah M. (8 October 2013). "Tunable Cytotoxicity of Rhodamine 6G via Anion Variations". Journal of the American Chemical Society. 135 (42): 15873–15879. Bibcode:2013JAChS.13515873M. doi:10.1021/ja407164w. PMC 4197813. PMID 24059469.
