= Bridgette Shannon =

African-American chemist

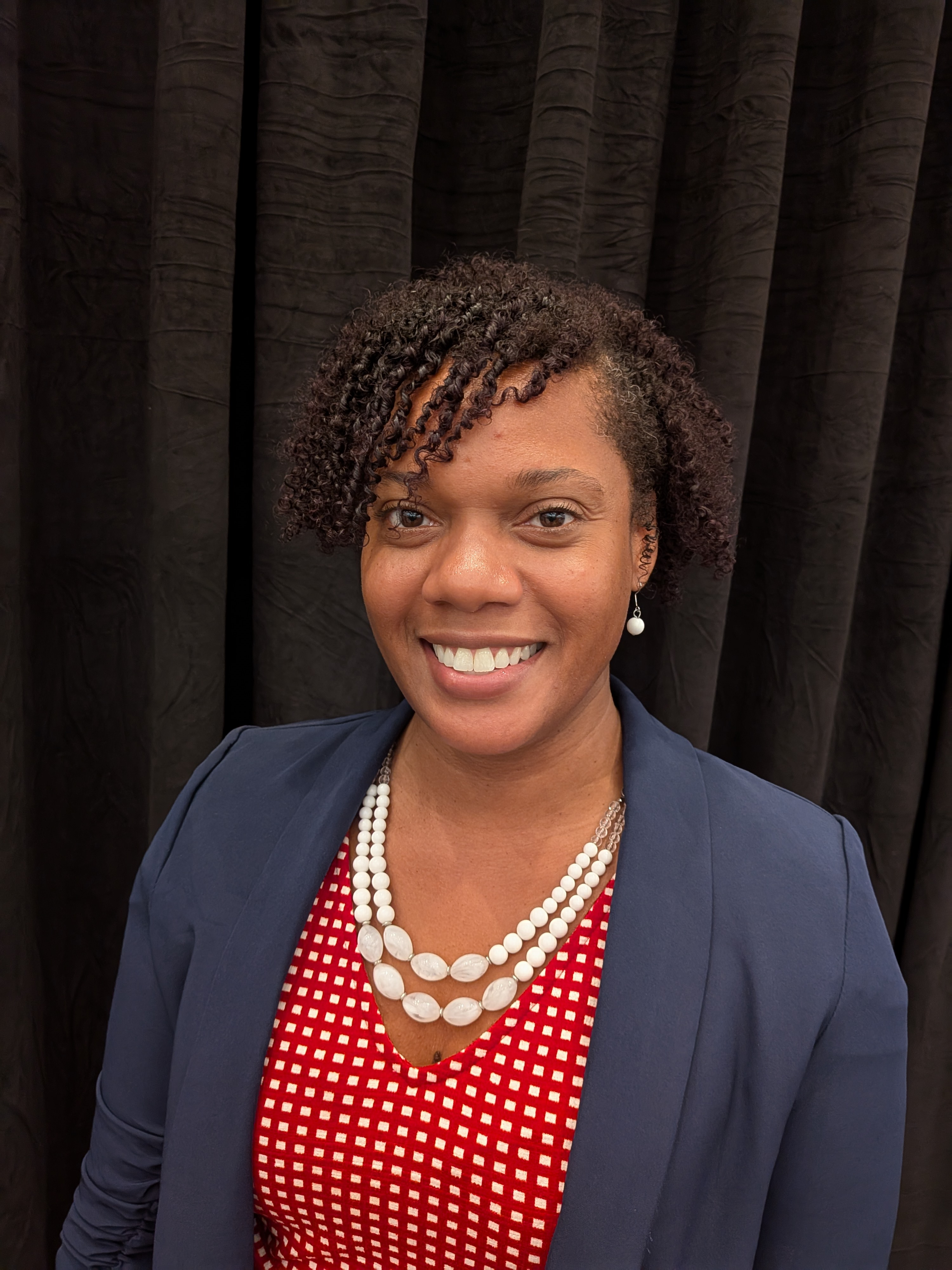
- Born: Bridgette Renee Blackman; Little Rock, Arkansas
- Education: Henderson State University; University of Arkansas
- Scientific career
- Workplaces: 3M
- Thesis: Efficient and stable near infrared emitters using band gap enigneered quantum dots for biomedical applications (2007)

Bridgette Renee Shannon (née Blackman) is an African-American chemist who is a research scientist at 3M. Shannon was the first African-American woman to complete a doctoral degree from the chemistry department at the University of Arkansas. She is the current president of the National Organization for the Professional Advancement of Black Chemists and Chemical Engineers (NOBCChE).

== Early life and education ==
Shannon was born and raised in Little Rock, Arkansas. She grew up in the central part of Little Rock in a neighborhood near the historic Central High School. She became interested in chemistry while attending J.A. Fair High School. Whilst she was dissuaded by her peers against studying chemistry, she could not resist her natural curiosity to understand how things worked. She persisted and became particularly interested in medical science and research.

During her summer holidays she took part in science summer camps and training programs at UAMS, which had a significant role in her choice to major in a field of Science in college. She earned her Bachelor of Science Degree in Chemistry from Henderson State University in 2002.

In 2003, Shannon attended the University of Arkansas for her graduate studies where she completed her PhD in inorganic chemistry in 2007 under the supervision of Prof. Xiaogang Peng. Her research was focused on the development of colloidal nanocrystalline quantum dots for biomedical application. She is the first African American female to obtain a Ph.D. in chemistry from the University of Arkansas.

== Research and career ==
Prior to graduate school, during the summer of 2002, Shannon worked at a L’Oreal cosmetic plant facility in Arkansas as a bulk chemist examining the quality of lipsticks.

In 2008, she moved to upstate New York to work for Corning Incorporated as a senior research scientist in their environmental technologies business, where she worked on developing honeycomb-like materials that can neutralize the toxic exhausts of the catalytic converters in cars. In 2012, she moved to the Material Science Division to support the development of specialty glass and left the company a year later.

In 2014, Shannon joined 3M in St. Paul, Minnesota, as a product developer in the Abrasives Systems Division, where she worked with global teams to design, develop, and deliver unique abrasive solutions to help customers in industrial markets advance their business goals.

In 2017, Shannon transitioned to an Application Engineering role for the Abrasives System Division 3M as a customer facing engineering expert for nonwoven abrasives products where she explored customer design needs and translated the information into technical requirements and business tools to guide product development and commercialization success.

In early 2022, Shannon joined the Transportation and Electronics Business group at 3M and is currently responsible for business development and product marketing for advanced materials. She is architecting the strategy for new growth opportunities while leading marketing initiatives and working with cross functional teams to meet customer needs.

== Awards and honors ==
In 2011, Bridgette was given the honor of Modern Day Technology Leader by the Science Technology Engineering and Mathematics (STEM) global competitiveness program. She was also featured in Fast Company and Essence magazines. She has been featured on PBS through the Twin Cities Public Television’s “SciGirls” video series themed “Real Women. Real Jobs. Making a real difference,” which received a Regional Emmy Award. In Shannon’s episode, she shared strategies for overcoming challenges and finding success and joy in a job where women are underrepresented. She was also featured in a PBS “Hands on Science” video series as a 3M Visiting Wizard where she helps to demonstrate the concept of air in the atmosphere to kids. Shannon also participated in 3M video series as part of The State of Science Index to provide a positive impact to society as a working mom. In the video, Shannon opens her home and work experience to the world as one of the faces of 3M to combat the perception that scientists are elitist and unapproachable. She has been featured in FairyGodboss and Refinery 29 digital media sites providing insights and innovation concepts to support working moms. She was also hosted on Minnesota Public Radio by Angela Davis discussing the topic ‘Science needs you’: The need for a diverse workforce in STEM fields.

She was elected president elect of the National Organization for the Professional Advancement of Black Chemists and Chemical Engineers in 2021 and is now serving as president for the 2023–2025 term.

== Select publications ==
- Blackman, Bridgette; Battaglia, D.; Peng, X. “Bright and Water-Soluble Near IR-Emitting CdSe/CdTe/ZnSe Type-II/Type-I Nanocrystals, Tuning the Efficiency and Stability by Growth”. Chemistry of Materials. 2008, 20, 4847-4853. DOI: 10.1021/cm8000688.
- Blackman, Bridgette. Efficient and stable near infrared emitters using band gap engineered quantum dots for biomedical applications. Ph.D. Dissertation. University of Arkansas, Fayetteville, AR. 2007, 97 pp.
- Blackman, Bridgette; Battaglia, D.; Peng, X. “Control of the Morphology of Complex Semiconductor Nanocrystals with a Type-II Hetero-junction, Dots vs. Peanuts, by Thermal Cycling”. Chemistry of Materials. 2007, 19, 3815-3821. DOI: 10.1021/cm0704682.
- Battaglia, D.; Blackman, Bridgette; Peng, X. “Coupled and Decoupled Dual Quantum Systems in One Semiconductor Nanocrystal”. Journal of American Chemical Society. 2005, 127, 10889-10997. DOI: 10.1021/ja0437297.
