= Robert Hamilton Austin =

American physicist

Robert Hamilton Austin (born 1946) is an American physicist and a professor of physics at Princeton University.

== Life ==
He was born in St. Charles, Illinois in 1946.

He received his BA in 1968 from Hope College. He received his M.S. and Ph.D. in physics from the University of Illinois at Urbana-Champaign. His current work concerns biological systems evolution and the research behind it.

== Career ==
He is currently professor of physics at Princeton University.

He is a Fellow of the American Physical Society (1988) and the American Association for the Advancement of Science. He was elected as a member of the National Academy of Sciences in 1999 and a member of the American Academy of Arts and Sciences in 2008.

In 2005, he received the Julius Edgar Lilienfeld Prize.
