= William A. Lester =

American chemist and academic

William A. Lester, Jr.
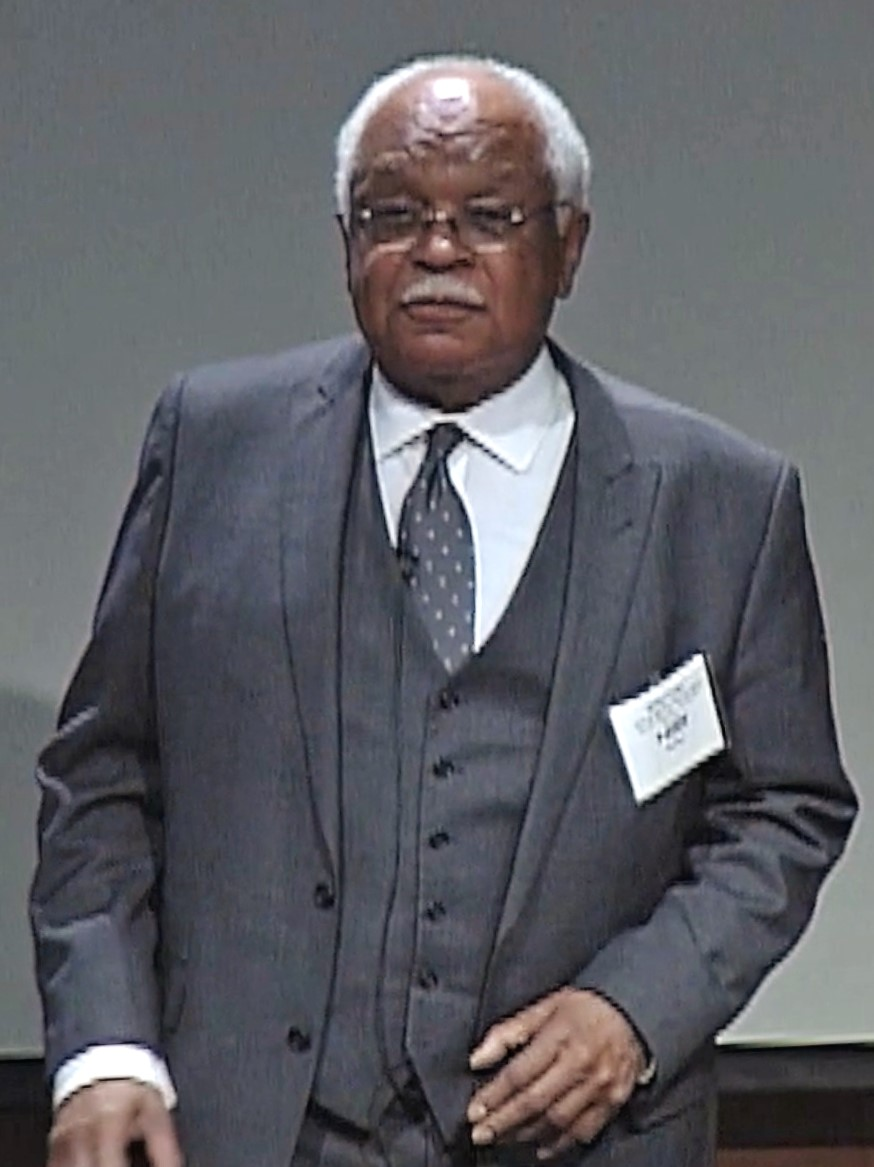
- Lester at NIST Colloquium Series in 2016
- Born: Chicago, Illinois
- Education: University of Chicago (BS); Catholic University of America (PhD)
- Known for: Advances in theoretical chemistry
- Spouse: Rochelle Reed
- Children: 2, including Bill Lester
- Scientific career
- Fields: Theoretical chemistry
- Workplaces: University of Wisconsin (Madison); University of California (Berkeley); National Institutes of Standards and Technology
- Thesis: A correlated molecular orbital study of the ground state of H₃+ (1964)
- Doctoral advisors: Morris Krauss
- Other academic advisors: Stuart A. Rice
- Website: chemistry.berkeley.edu/people/william-lester

William Alexander Lester Jr. (born April 24, 1937) is an American chemist who was a professor at the University of California, Berkeley. He was awarded the National Organization for the Professional Advancement of Black Chemists and Chemical Engineers Percy L. Julian Award, elected a Fellow of the American Physical Society, and elected a Fellow of the American Association for the Advancement of Science.

== Early life and education ==
Lester was born in the South Side, Chicago, when schools were still segregated. After World War II his family moved and he enrolled at a high school that had previously been only for white people. Lester secured a scholarship endowed by a former librarian from his Calumet High School, which allowed him to attend the University of Chicago.

Lester played college basketball. His sporting efforts are honored at the University of Chicago, where he is recognized as the first player to score over one thousand points, and the only player in UC history to average over twenty five points per game in a season.

He completed his bachelor's degree in chemistry, before which he had secured a part-time research position in the Laboratory of Molecular Structure and Spectra. The lab was based in the department of physics, which was directed by future Nobel laureate Robert S. Mulliken. These interactions prompted him to focus on molecular quantum mechanics. He was supported by Henry Taube to pursue a master's degree, which he completed under the supervision of Stuart A. Rice.

At the Catholic University of America he carried out doctoral research on the molecular orbital structure of H_{3}+. During his studies, Lester became affiliated with the National Bureau of Standards— which later became the National Institute of Standards and Technology (NIST)— where he spent nearly three years as a physical chemist.

Lester had two children, including professional race car driver Bill Lester.

== Research and career ==
In 1964, Lester joined the Theoretical Chemistry Institute at the University of Wisconsin–Madison, associated with the chemistry department, as a postdoctoral associate, soon after becoming its assistant director. After becoming an instructor on the Chemistry faculty, and working in Wisconsin for four years he attended an American Physical Society meeting at the University of California, Berkeley, during which time he visited the IBM Research Lab. They offered him a position, and he joined Joseph Gayles there, but himself worked on atom-molecule inelastic scattering. In 1978, he was appointed Director of the National Resource for Computation in Chemistry, sited at the Lawrence Berkeley National Laboratory. In 1983 he was made Fellow of the American Physical Society, and in 1991 he was elected Fellow of the American Association for the Advancement of Science.

Lester's research made use of computational chemistry to understand the electronic structures of molecules. He primarily used the Monte Carlo method. His group developed the matrix elements that connected various electronic states.

== Awards and honors ==
- In 1957, Lester was awarded the University of Chicago Stagg Medal for scholarship, athletics and excellence of character.
- In 1979, he received the Percy L. Julian Award of the National Organization for the Professional Advancement of Black Chemists and Chemical Engineers.
- In 1983, Lester was elected a fellow of the American Physical Society, "For contributions to the application of computers to chemistry."
- In 2007, the University of California, Berkeley held a special symposium in honor of Lester's seventieth birthday.
- In 2019 the Association of Top Professionals recognized Lester's distinguished career with a Lifetime Achievement Award.
- In 2020, the Chemistry Department at the University of California, Berkeley, established a lectureship in honor of Lester. The university stated, "The lectureship is intended to welcome distinguished underrepresented minority (URM) scholars to present their research and engage in discourse about their experiences and challenges of becoming scientists." In 2024, the lecturer was Mexican-American chemist Alán Aspuru-Guzik, who had earned his doctoral degree under Lester's guidance.

== Selected publications ==
- Austin, Brian M.; Zubarev, Dmitry Yu.; Lester, William A. (2012-01-11). "Quantum Monte Carlo and Related Approaches". Chemical Reviews. 112 (1): 263–288. doi:10.1021/cr2001564. ISSN 0009-2665. Wikidata Q46735624.
- Reynolds, Peter J.; Ceperley, David M.; Alder, Berni J.; Lester, William A. (1982-12-01). "Fixed-node quantum Monte Carlo for molecules a) b)". The Journal of Chemical Physics. 77 (11): 5593–5603. Bibcode:1982JChPh..77.5593R. doi:10.1063/1.443766. ISSN 0021-9606.
- Austin, Brian M.; Zubarev, Dmitry Yu.; Lester, William A. (2012-01-11). "Quantum Monte Carlo and Related Approaches". Chemical Reviews. 112 (1): 263–288. doi:10.1021/cr2001564. ISSN 0009-2665. PMID 22196085.
