= Chang Kee Jung =

American experimental physicist

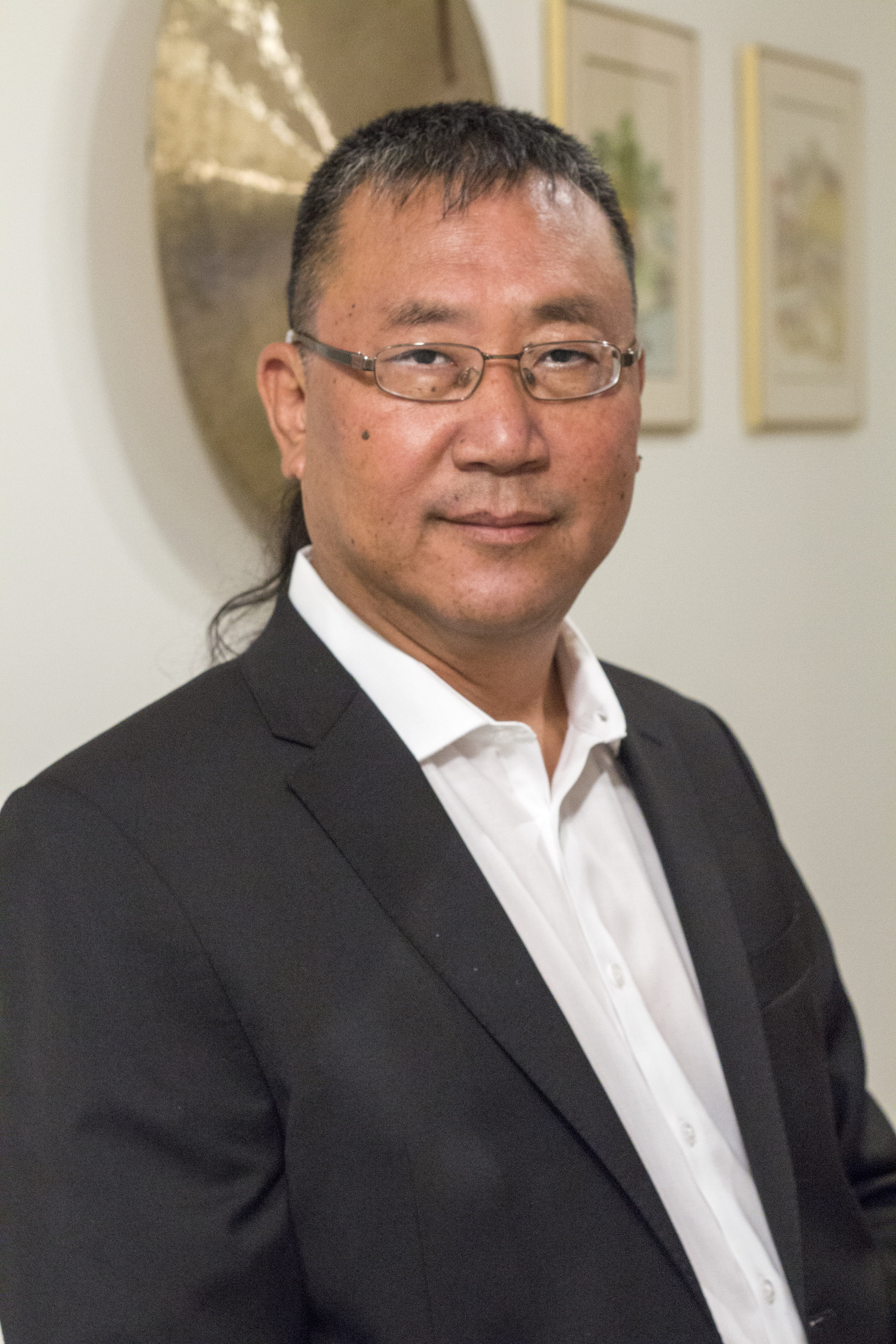
- Photo of Chang Kee Jung.
- Born: 24 April, 1955; South Korea
- Education: Indiana University, Bloomington Indiana
- Awards: SUNY Distinguished Professorship, 2015; The Breakthrough Prize in Fundamental Physics 2016 (shared, Super-Kamiokande, K2K and T2K Collaborations), 2015; Chancellor’s Award for Excellence in Scholarship and Creative Activity, State U. of New York, 2014; Outstanding Faculty (Teacher) Award, Department of Physics and Astronomy, Stony Brook U., 2010
- Scientific career
- Fields: Physics (high-energy particle physics)
- Workplaces: Stony Brook University
- Thesis: Measurement of The F + Meson Lifetime (May 1986)
- Doctoral advisor: Prof. Harold O. Ogren
- Website: http://superk.physics.sunysb.edu/~alpinist/

Chang Kee Jung is an American experimental physicist and a leading expert in neutrino oscillations. He is a Distinguished Professor of Physics at Stony Brook University and serves as chair of the Physics and Astronomy Department at Stony Brook University.

== Early life ==
Chang Kee Jung was born in Daegu, South Korea, and moved to Seoul around age 10. He graduated from Seoul High School in 1973 and completed his B.S. in physics at Seoul National University in 1979, with a brief interruption for mandatory military service from 1976 to 1977. During his undergraduate period, Jung was an avid member of the Seoul National University College of Liberal Arts and Sciences Alpine Club. In 1980, Jung moved to the U.S. to enroll in a Ph.D. program at Indiana University in Bloomington, Indiana. While enrolled in the university, he also studied music and music composition. Jung received his Ph.D. specializing in Experimental High Energy Physics from Indiana University in 1986.

== Academic career ==
Jung became a research associate (postdoc) at the Stanford Linear Accelerator (SLAC) in 1986. He became an assistant professor at Stony Brook University in 1990, gaining full professorship in 2000, and becoming a SUNY Distinguished Professor in 2015. He received a SUNY Chancellor's Award for Excellence in Scholarship and Creative Activities in 2014.

== Research ==
From 1986 to 1990, Jung completed his postdoctoral research at SLAC, Stanford University, working on the HRS Experiment, PEP, and the MarkII Experiment, SLC. In 1991 he joined the Super-Kamiokande (SK) experiment and established the Stony Brook Nucleon decay and Neutrino (NN) Group. The group was part of a coalition that participated in the Super-Kamiokande experiment, which led to the discovery of the neutrino oscillation phenomenon. This work was awarded the Nobel Prize in Physics in 2015. Jung has served on the boards and committees of several Neutrino and Nucleon Decay experiments, including his role as co-spokesperson for the K2K U.S. Collaboration and the international co-spokesperson for the T2K Collaboration. All three experiments (Super-Kamiokande, K2K and T2K) were awarded the Breakthrough Prize in Fundamental Physics in 2016.

Presently, Jung is the spokesperson for the T2K US Collaboration and the founder and chair of the Steering Committee for the Next generation Nucleon decay and Neutrino detectors (NNN) Workshop Series. He is also working on the Deep Underground Neutrino Experiment.

== Awards and Honors ==
In 2021, Jung was awarded the 2022 Julius Edgar Lilienfeld Prize from the American Physical Society.

In 2019, Jung received the High Energy and Particle Physics Prize from the European Physical Society (shared, D0 Collaboration).

Jung received the 2016 Breakthrough Prize in Fundamental Physics (shared, Super-K, K2K, T2K collaborations)

Jung has been elected to the following fellowships:

- Fellow of the American Physical Society (APS), 2002
- Fellow of the American Association for Advancement of Science (AAAS), 2017

== The Physics of Sports ==
Jung has been committed to spreading knowledge of physics to non-science majors and the public throughout his teaching career. He introduced two courses targeted at non-science majors at Stony Brook University, titled "Light, Color and Vision" and "The Physics of Sports." The latter, created in 2003, was the first of its kind to be offered in the U.S. Jung's success with this course has since lead him to be sought out by sports news outlets, such as NBC 4 New York and ABC News. Notably, he has been cited for his scientific insight on the NFL deflate-gate scandal.
