= Oyekan =

Oyekan is a West African surname of Yoruba origin, which means "the next to be crowned". The name may refer to:

- Adeyinka Oyekan (Oyekan II) (1911–2003), Yoruba monarch
- Lawson Oyekan (born 1961), British sculptor
- Oyekan I (1871–1900), Yoruba monarch
- Soni Oyekan (1946–2021), American chemical engineer
