= Lawson Oyekan =

British-Nigerian sculptor (born 1961)

Lawson Oyekan (born in London, England 1961), is a British-Nigerian contemporary ceramic sculptor and the first recipient of the Grand Prix Award for the 1st World Ceramic Biennale 2001 in Korea.

== Overview ==
Lawson Oyedokun Oyekan was born in 1961 in Stockwell, England and grew up in Ibadan, son of a Nigerian high court judge, attended Loyola College, Ibadan, Nigeria, West Africa, returning to England in 1983 to study art where he attended the art foundation course in East Ham. Initially learning the practice of throwing with porcelain, Oyekan created diaphragm-like artworks with a lifted centre. He then moved on to making hand-built larger, monolithic forms. Both of these constructions include his experiences as a Londoner, as well as an African. His pieces are adorned with piercings and sometimes include text in English or his native language, Yoruba. There is a presence in Oyekan's forms that speak of his experiences and his upbringing.

"My intent is to express human endurance and deliver a message of reassurance: that human suffering can be healed." prnewswire.com

Beginning his studies in Nigeria with applied Chemistry and later studied a diploma in general art at The Ibadan Polytechnic, Ibadan. Lawson then returned to England in 1983 to pursue art. First studying at Central School of Art and Design in 1985 on a degree course, he then went on to study at the Royal College of Art in London from 1988-1990 where he was lectured by the likes of Eduardo Paolozzi. During his studies, he received the Darwin Scholarship Award in 1989 and is most notable for receiving the Grand Prize Award in the 2001 Korean Biennale for his piece "HEALING BEING," from his Coming up for Air series. As a contemporary sculptor currently making work, he shows and exhibits work all over the world in Europe, Korea, Japan, and the United States.

== Work description and Style ==
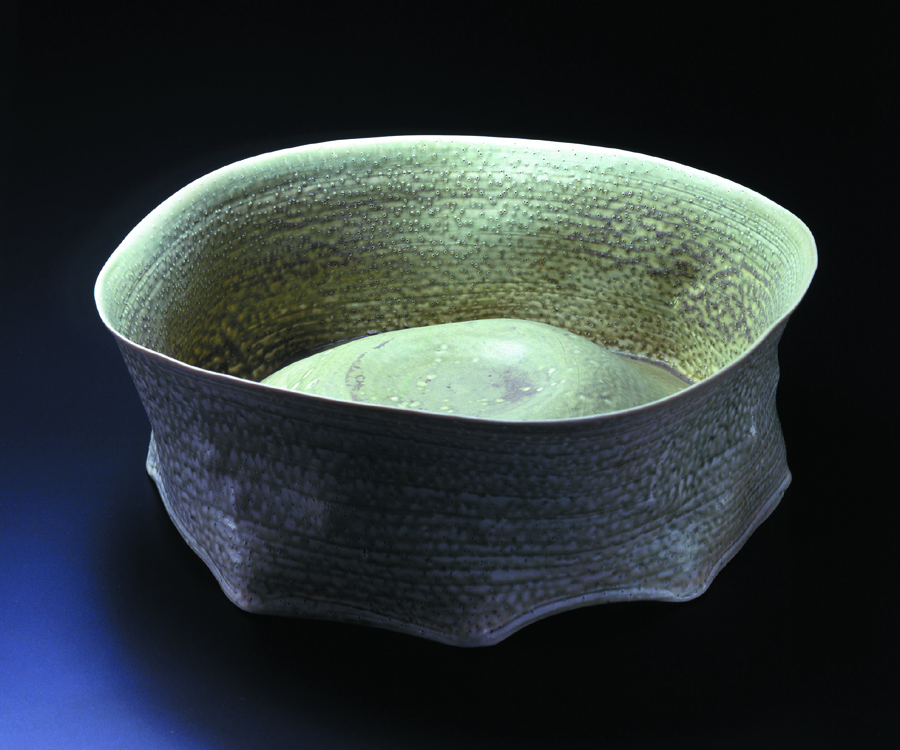
Passage with Palmprint

One of Oyekan's best-known works is the "HEALING BEING" piece from his Coming Up for Air series. This piece is a monolithic, terracotta sculpture, closed, measuring 6 feet and 7 inches in height. Lawson's work is characterized by surfaces often left dry and unglazed, while other works include a variety of coloured slips. A recent exhibition in Minnesota in 2006, Solstice Lip Series, includes a combination of steady stoneware ceramic vessels including a variety of whistling adjacent perforations on congruent monoliths. The passage of light as well as the ability for the pieces to "breathe" is a concern in portraying a life in his work through these vessels.

The development of Lawson's work comes from his training in England in porcelain wheel throwing to the development of his own techniques through hand building, providing his experiences that come from these two locations and lifestyles. Currently Lawson is living in London, England while also working in a studio in Denmark. He also has plans to open a studio in Nigeria in combination with an education facility.

== See also ==
- Oyekan

== Sources ==
- Pamela Johnson. "Dimensions of Light," The Decorative and Applied Arts Magazine, CRAFT. January/February 1994.
- Ulysses Grant Dietz, Great Pots Contemporary Ceramics from Function to Fantasy. The Newark Museum Association 2003 p. 171, figure 152, and p. 169.
- Maryland Institute College of Art, Baltimore, Maryland. "Lawson Oyekan, and the Spirit of Nature" 2005. February 3 to March 20, p. 6.
- Pamela Johnson. "Dimensions of Light," The Decorative and Applied Arts Magazine, CRAFT. January/February 1994.
