= Joseph Francisco =

American chemist

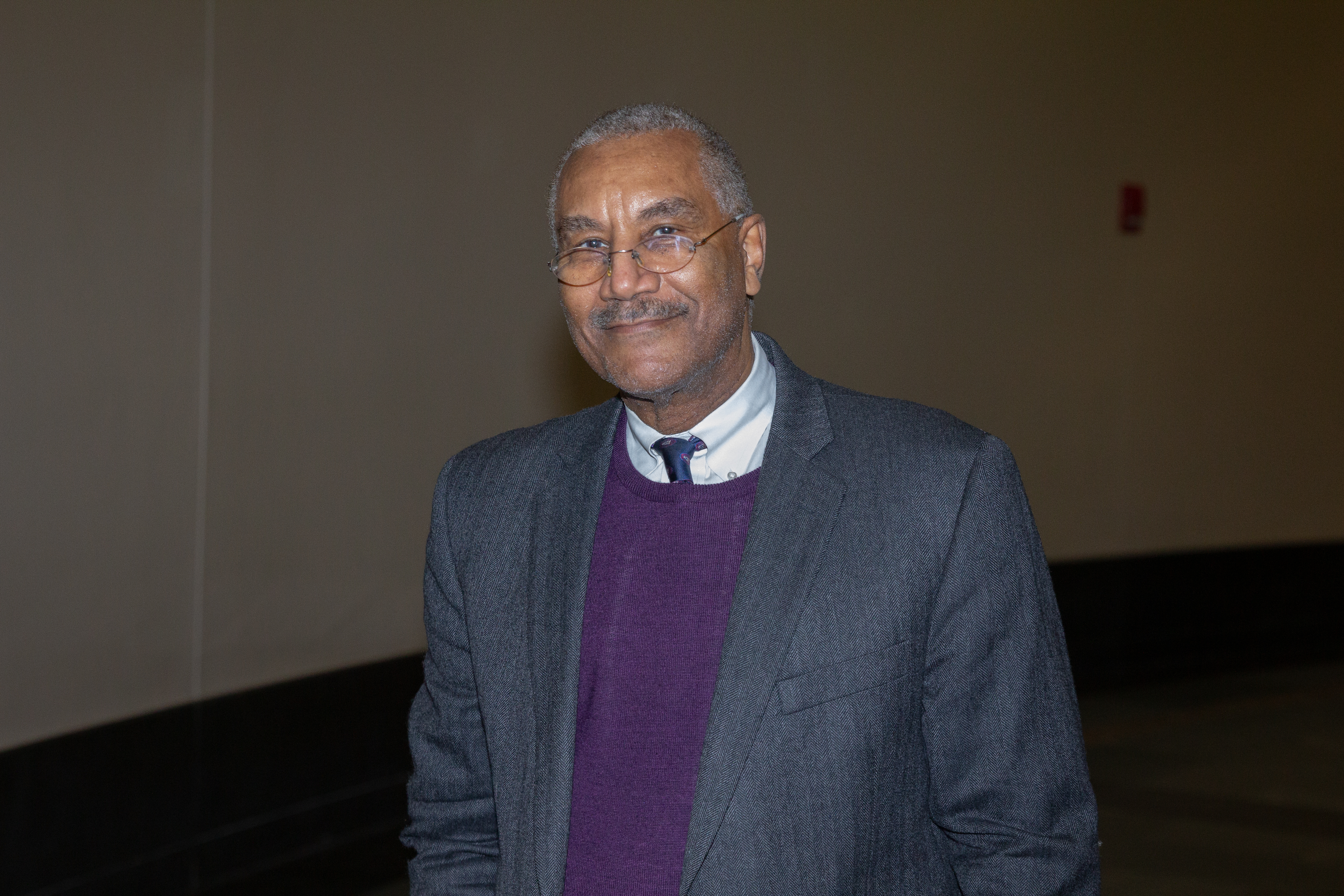
- Born: March 26, 1955 (age 71); New Orleans, Louisiana
- Citizenship: United States
- Education: University of Texas at Austin; Massachusetts Institute of Technology
- Known for: Atmospheric chemistry
- Awards: Guggenheim Fellowship; Sloan Fellowship; 2007 Herbert Newby McCoy Award (Purdue); Camille Dreyfus Teacher-Scholar Award (Purdue); 2010 American Academy of Arts and Sciences; 2013 US National Academy of Sciences
- Scientific career
- Fields: Physical chemistry
- Workplaces: Wayne State University; Purdue University; University of Nebraska–Lincoln; University of Pennsylvania
- Doctoral advisor: Jeffrey Steinfeld

Joseph Salvadore Francisco Jr. (born 26 March 1955) is an American scientist and the former president of the American Chemical Society from 2009 to 2010. He currently serves as the President's Distinguished Professor of Earth and Environmental Science and professor of chemistry at the University of Pennsylvania. He was the Dean of the College of Arts and Sciences, and held the Elmer H. and Ruby M. Cordes Chair in chemistry at the University of Nebraska–Lincoln until 2018.

== Family and education ==
Joseph Francisco was born in New Orleans, Louisiana, on March 26, 1955. He was born to Lucinda and Joe Francisco, Sr., but grew up in Beaumont, Texas with his grandmother Sarah Walker. As he was growing up in Beaumont, Texas, his possibilities were limited because of who he was and what he looked like. His life consisted of day-to-day tasks and was never about future planning. College was a far-fetched dream, so he never paid much attention to it. Despite the uncertainty, his grandmother, Sarah Walker, who was a strong woman and a great role model for him—was supportive and encouraged him to get an education. He attended Forest Park High School.

Dr. Richard B. Price of Lamar University who he had met by chance encouraged him to pursue a college education. In 1973, he entered the University of Texas, Austin and graduated in 1977. He entered the Massachusetts Institute of Technology (MIT), as a graduate student (PhD, and graduated in 1983). In 1983, at age 27, Francisco decided to travel to pursue and obtain his postdoctoral research fellow in Cambridge University, England. In 1992, Francisco married Priya, and has three daughters. He currently resides in Philadelphia with his family.

== Career ==
=== Academic chemist ===
As a researcher, Francisco has made contributions in numerous areas of Atmospheric Chemistry. His research aided in progressing understandings of chemical processes in the atmosphere. Francisco and his colleague Marsha Lester, the University of Pennsylvania's Professor Edmund J. Kahn discovered an unusual molecule that is essential to the atmosphere's ability to break down pollutants, particularly the compounds that cause acid rain. The discovery is compared to a human body metabolizing food, the Earth's atmosphere has the ability to "burn," or oxidize pollutants, especially nitric oxides emitted from sources such as factories and automobiles. Their research further shows that what does not get oxidized in the atmosphere falls back to Earth in the form of acid rain. "The chemical details of how the atmosphere removes nitric acid have not been clear," Francisco notes. "This gives us important insights into this process. Without that knowledge we really can't understand the conditions under which nitric acid is removed from the atmosphere."

Francisco says the discovery will allow scientists to better model how pollutants react in the atmosphere and to predict potential outcomes.A technical paper describing the molecule is published in a special edition of the Proceedings of the National Academy of Sciences.

Francisco's laboratory focuses on basic studies in spectroscopy, kinetics, and photochemistry of novel transient species in the gas phase. Joe has published more than 400 journal articles, written nine book chapters and co-authored the textbook, Chemical Kinetics and Dynamics.

=== Academic and professional appointments ===
Francisco currently serves as the President's Distinguished Professor of Earth and Environmental Science and Professor of Chemistry at the University of Pennsylvania. He served as the Dean of College of Arts and Sciences, Elmer H. and Ruby M.Cordes Chair in chemistry at the University of Nebraska–Lincoln until 2018. He was president of the National Organization for the Professional Advancement of Black Chemists and Chemical Engineers from 2006 to 2008. He was appointed a senior visiting fellow at the Institute of Advanced Studies at the University of Bologna, Italy; Professeur Invité at the Université de Paris-Est, France; a visiting professor at Uppsala Universitet, Sweden; and an Honorary International Chair Professor, National Taipei University of Technology, Taiwan. He served as president of the American Chemical Society in 2010. He was elected as the Fellow of the American Academy of Arts and Sciences, 2010 and was elected member of the U.S. National Academy of Sciences in 2013. He also received the honorary Doctor of Science degree, Tuskegee University., 2010. President Barack Obama appointed Joseph S. Francisco, PhD, to serve on the President's Committee on the National Medal of Science for the period 2010–2012, 2012–2014. In 2021 he was elected to the American Philosophical Society.

== Awards ==
- Percy L. Julian Award (1995)
- Fellow of the American Physical Society (1998)
- Fellow of the American Association for the Advancement of Science (2001)
- Fellow of the American Chemical Society (2012)
- Guggenheim Fellow (1993)
- Alexander von Humboldt U.S.Senior Scientist Award
