= Thomas Mensah (engineer) =

Ghanaian-American chemical engineer (1949/1950 – 2024)

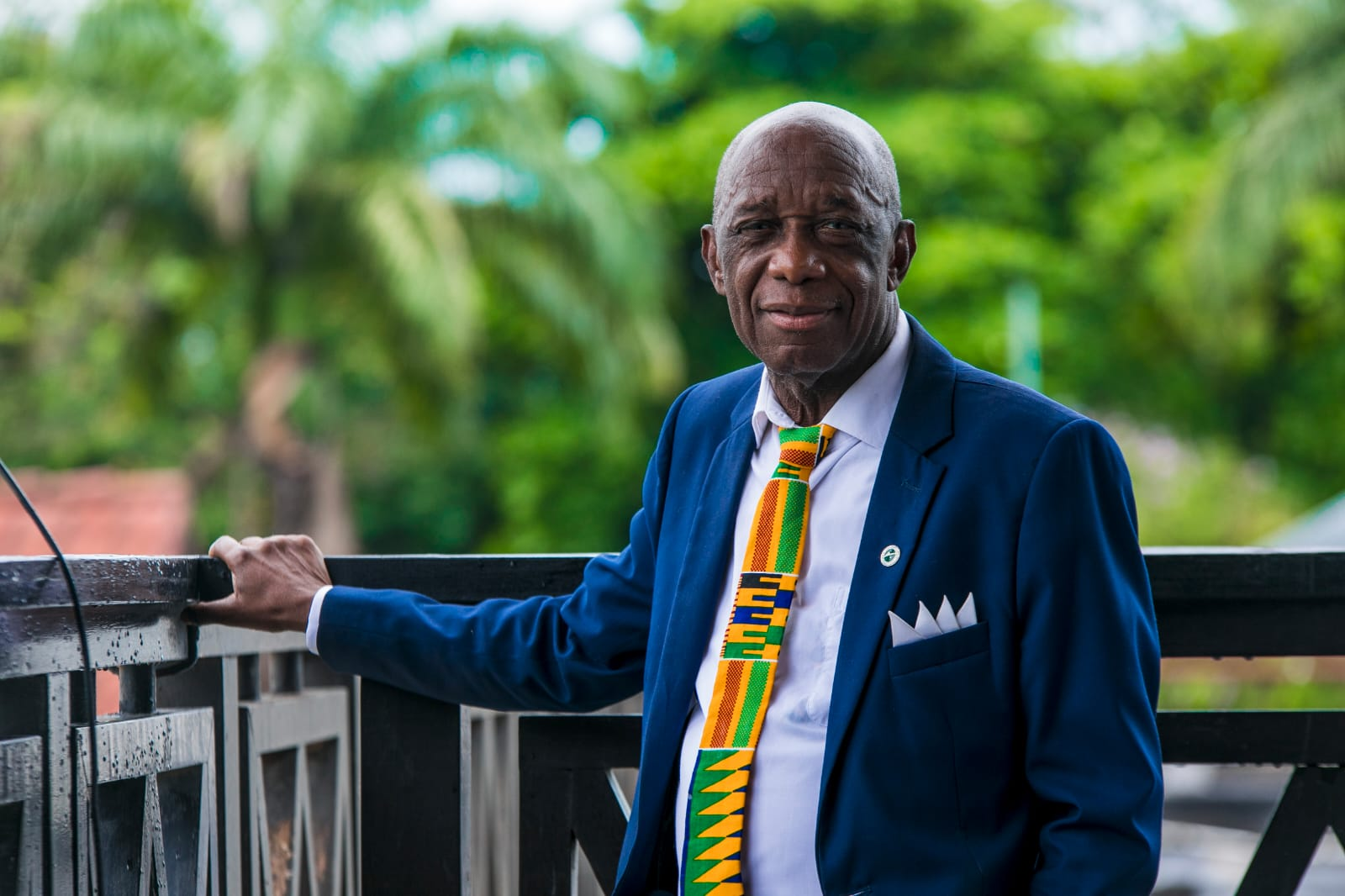
- Born: Thomas Owusu Mensah; 1950; Kumasi, Ashanti
- Died: 27 March 2024 (aged 74); Kumasi, Ghana
- Education: Adisadel College
- Alma mater: Kwame Nkrumah University of Science and Technology; Montpellier University
- Occupations: President and CEO of Georgia Aerospace Systems
- Known for: Pioneer in fiber optic technology
- Awards: AIChE 100, 2008; Fellow AIChE; Assoc Fellow AIAA; Percy Julian Award; MAC Eminent Engineer; Fellow National Academy of Inventors

Thomas Owusu Mensah (January 1950 – 27 March 2024) was a Ghanaian-American chemical engineer and inventor who contributed to the development of fiber optic manufacturing and nanotechnology. He had 14 patents, and was inducted into the US National Academy of Inventors in 2015. In 2017, Mensah served as editor-in-chief of the textbook Nanotechnology Commercialization, published by John Wiley & Sons.

== Early life and education ==
Thomas Mensah was born in Kumasi, Ghana, in 1950. His father, J. K. Mensah, was a merchant who shipped cocoa products to chocolate manufacturers in France. Mensah was fluent in French, and won the National French competition held in Accra, Ghana, both at the Ordinary Level (1968) and Advanced Level (1970).

Mensah attended Adisadel College in Cape Coast, Ghana, and completed his undergraduate studies in chemical engineering at Kwame Nkrumah University of Science and Technology in Kumasi. He then received a French government fellowship to study at Montpellier University in France. While there, he took part in a program at Massachusetts Institute of Technology (MIT) and received a certificate in Modeling and Simulation of Chemical Processes from MIT in 1977. A year later, Mensah graduated with his PhD in Chemical Engineering from Montpelier University.

== Career ==
Mensah worked at Air Products and Chemicals from 1980 to 1983.

In 1983, he joined Corning Glass Works, working in fiber optics research at Sullivan Park, New York. Researchers at Corning had previously developed optical fiber with loss below the crucial attenuation limit of 20 dB/km, but the fibers could not be manufactured at rates higher than 2 meters per second. Mensah improved the manufacturing process through a series of innovations, raising the speed of manufacture to 20 meters per second by 1985. This made the cost of optical fiber comparable to traditional copper cables. Mensah received the Corning Glass Works Individual Outstanding Contributor Award for this work in 1985. His work ultimately raised speed of manufacture above 50 m/s. On 24 February 2017, WTOC-TV News ran a segment for Black History Month about Mensah's work on fiber optics and its impact on the internet.

Mensah moved to Bell Laboratories in 1986, where he led a program to develop the first laser-guided weapons for the US Department of Defense guided missile program. This program enabled the development of missiles that travel at the speed of sound (Mach 1).

Mensah was president and CEO of Georgia Aerospace Systems, which manufactures nanocomposite structures used in missiles and aircraft for the US Department of Defense.

Mensah served on the board of several organizations, including the AIChE National Board of Directors (1987–1990), and was a trustee of the board of AIChE Foundation and a board member for the NASA Space Grant Consortium at Georgia Institute of Technology. He was elected a Fellow of the National Academy of Inventors in 2014.

Mensah was chairman of Entertainment Arts Research Inc, a virtual reality and video game design company.

From early 2016, he worked to create a "Silicon Valley of the South" in the U.S. state of Texas.

== Death ==
Mensah died in Kumasi, Ghana, on 27 March 2024, at the age of 74.

== Awards ==
Mensah was a recipient of several awards, including Turner's Trumpet Award for Fiber Optics Innovation, the Percy L. Julian Award, the Golden Torch Award, which is the highest award given by NSBE, the William Grimes Award, and the Eminent Engineers award by AIChE. He was also a member of the AIChE 100. In December 2017, he received the Kwame Nkrumah African Genius Award in Science/Technology and Innovation in Ghana.

On 23 November 2017, Mensah delivered the 10th R. P. Baffour Lecture at the Kwame Nkrumah University of Science and Technology, where he was awarded an honorary Doctor of Science degree after the lecture. In November 2015, he received the International Business Leadership Award from African Leadership magazine in Atlanta, Georgia, USA. He has been profiled in Ebony magazine's edition of October 2006 and Chemical Engineering Progress Magazine's edition of October 2008, March 2009 and March 2015.

Mensah served on the visiting committee in Chemical Engineering at the Massachusetts Institute of Technology from 1988 to 1992. He was the author of four books: Fiber Optics Engineering in 1987, Superconductor Engineering in 1992, his autobiography The Right Stuff Comes in Black, Too in 2013, and Nanotechnology Commercialization in 2017. In the first quarter of 2015, the government of the U.S. state of Georgia passed a House Resolution to commend Mensah and his works.
