= Bharat Ratra =

Indian-American physicist and educator (born 1960)

Bharat Vishnu Ratra
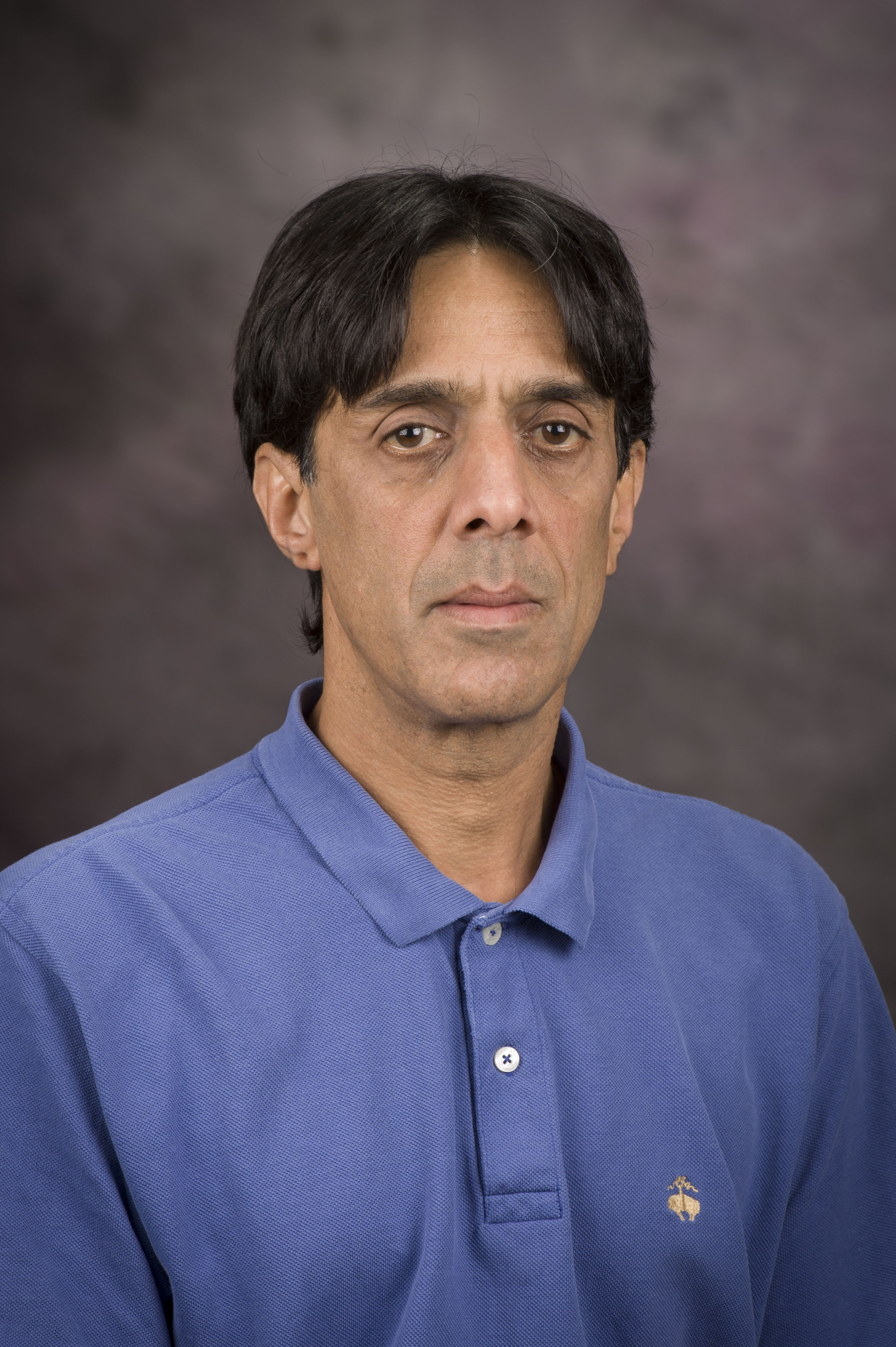
- Ratra in 2012
- Born: 26 January 1960 (age 66); Bombay, India
- Education: Indian Institute of Technology Delhi (MS); Stanford University (PhD)
- Known for: Quintessence (physics); Dark energy inflation
- Scientific career
- Fields: Theoretical physics Physical cosmology Astroparticle physics
- Workplaces: Kansas State University; Massachusetts Institute of Technology; California Institute of Technology; Princeton University; Stanford University
- Doctoral advisor: Leonard Susskind; Michael Peskin

Bharat Vishnu Ratra (born 26 January 1960) is an Indian-American physicist, physical cosmologist and astroparticle physicist who is currently a university distinguished professor of physics at Kansas State University.

He is known for his work on dynamical dark energy and on the quantum-mechanical generation of energy density and magnetic field fluctuations during inflation.

== Biography ==
Ratra was born on 26 January 1960, in Bombay. He graduated with a Master of Science in physics from the Indian Institute of Technology Delhi in 1982 and completed his doctorate in physics at Stanford University in 1986 under the supervision of Leonard Susskind and Michael Peskin.

Ratra was a postdoctoral fellow at the Stanford Linear Accelerator Center, Princeton University, the California Institute of Technology and the Massachusetts Institute of Technology. He joined Kansas State University in 1996 as an assistant professor of physics. He was promoted to associate professor in 2001 and professor in 2004.

== Academics and research ==
Ratra has worked in a number of areas of cosmology and astroparticle and early universe physics.

In 1988, Ratra and Jim Peebles of Princeton University proposed the first dynamical dark energy scalar field, or quintessence, model. Dark energy is the leading candidate for the mechanism that is responsible for causing the observed accelerated cosmological expansion.

Ratra and his students and collaborators have pioneered measurements of the redshift of the transition between an earlier epoch when cosmological expansion decelerated because dark and baryonic (ordinary) matter dominated the cosmological energy budget and the current epoch where the cosmological expansion accelerates because dark energy dominates the current cosmological energy budget.

Ratra and his students and collaborators have developed new cosmological probes and used these in conjunction with better-established ones to measure the Hubble constant (Hubble's law), the geometry of space (Shape of the universe), and dark energy dynamics.

Ratra's early universe research includes the first consistent semi-classical computation of the spectrum of energy density perturbations from inflation. He collaborated with Willy Fischler of the University of Texas at Austin and Leonard Susskind of Stanford University on this computation. He has also computed the power spectrum of energy density perturbations in non-spatially-flat inflation models.

Ratra also proposed the first inflation model that can generate, from quantum fluctuations, a large-enough primordial cosmological magnetic field to be able to explain observed galactic magnetic fields.

== Honours ==
- National Science Foundation CAREER award (1999)
- Fellow of the American Physical Society (2002)
- Fellow of the American Association for the Advancement of Science (2005)
- Olin Petefish Award in Basic Science (2017)
- Fellow of the American Astronomical Society (2023)
- American Physical Society Julius Edgar Lilienfeld Prize (2025)
- American Physical Society Five Sigma Physicist Honor (2025)
