= James W. Mitchell =

African American chemist

James W. Mitchell (born November 16, 1943) is an African American chemist and was the David and Lucille Packard Professor of Material Science at Howard University.

== Early life and education ==
James W. Mitchell was born on November 16, 1943, in Durham, North Carolina. He was one of five children born to Willie and Eunice Mitchell. His interest in chemistry began in 1960 during a summer program at North Carolina Central University that was funded by the National Science Foundation.

Despite suffering financial hardships, he was able to fund his education through a scholarship and by working on-campus at North Carolina A&T State University. He earned his B.S. degree in chemistry in 1965. He pursued his studies in analytical chemistry, receiving his Ph.D. degree in 1970 from Iowa State University.

== Career and achievements ==
Mitchell's first job after receiving his Ph.D. was with AT&T Bell Laboratories in Murray Hill, New Jersey. Initially starting as a member of the technical staff, he quickly rose through the ranks to become head of the Analytical Chemistry Research Department in 1975. During his time there, he also became one of the founders for the Association of Black Laboratory Employees. He supervised the Inorganic Analytical Chemistry Research Group and though his leadership, made the department a renowned laboratory research organization worldwide. He was first Black Bell Labs Fellow and the first black director and vice president of research. In 2002 he began working at Howard University as the David and Lucille Packard Professor of Materials Science and Chemical Engineering. He also co-wrote a book, Contamination Control in Trace Analysis. He was director of the CREST Nanoscale Analytical Sciences Research and Education Center. He has published over 60 scientific papers, and patented several innovative processes.

As a chemist, he wrote approximately 100 articles. Mitchell developed processes, such as "on-demand" reagent generation, which improved the production of high-purity materials for optical fibers and semiconductors. He established benchmarks in materials purity and quality, enabling transformative advancements in optical communication and high-power laser technologies. He also led research in diamond material development, introducing methods to enhance diamond properties for industrial applications.

Mitchell received the Percy L. Julian Research Award and the Pharmacia Industrial Analytical Chemistry Award. He was elected to the National Academy of Engineering in 1989. In 1999, he was awarded the Lifetime Achievement in Industry Award from the National Society of Black Engineers. He was named the 1993 Black Engineer of the Year by US Black Engineer magazine for his contributions to analytical chemistry and materials engineering.
