= Victor McCrary =

Physical Chemist (born 1955)

Victor R. McCrary, Jr.
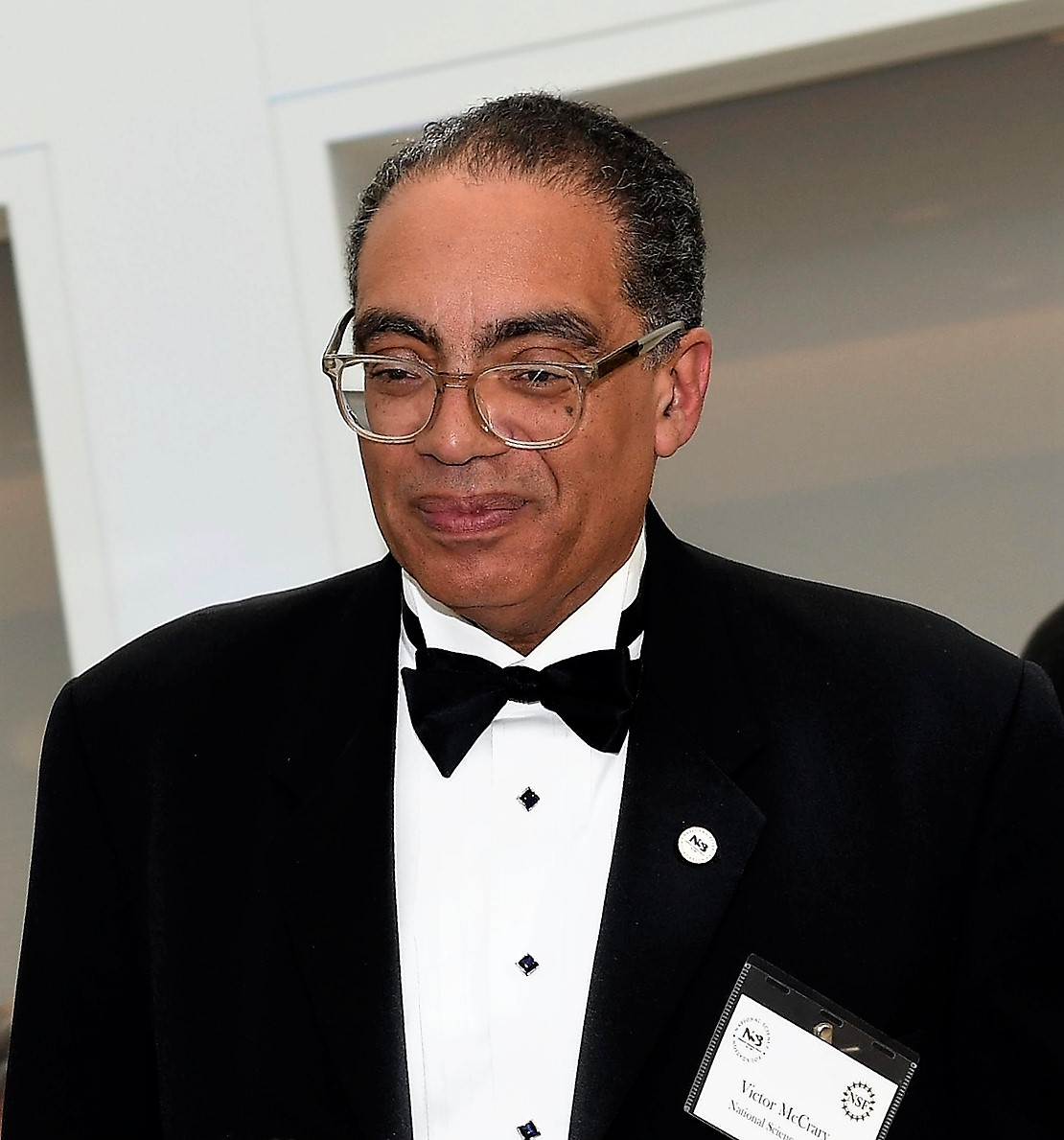
- McCrary at the National Science Board May 2017 awards ceremony
- Born: May 16, 1955 (age 71)

Academic background
- Education: Catholic University America (BA); Howard University (PhD); University of Pennsylvania (MS)

Academic work
- Institutions: Johns Hopkins University; Bell Labs; University of Tennessee; Morgan State University; National Institute of Standards and Technology

Member of the National Science Board
- In office October 2016 – April 2026
- Appointed by: Barack Obama

Victor R. McCrary Jr. (born May 16, 1955) is an American physical chemist who is vice provost for national security innovation at The Catholic University of America. He is a fellow of the American Chemical Society, former president of the National Organization for the Professional Advancement of Black Chemists and Chemical Engineers and former chair of the National Science Board.

== Early life and education ==
McCrary was born and raised in Washington, D.C. He earned a Bachelor of Arts degree in chemistry from the Catholic University of America, a PhD in chemistry from Howard University, and a Master of Science in engineering and technology management from the University of Pennsylvania.

== Career ==
After earning his doctorate, McCrary joined Bell Labs as a member of the technical team. In 1995 he joined the National Institute of Standards and Technology, where he led convergent systems.

McCrary joined Johns Hopkins Applied Physics Laboratory in 2003. In 2007, he was made President at the National Organization for the Professional Advancement of Black Chemists and Chemical Engineers (NOBCChE). McCrary worked as vice chancellor at the University of Tennessee and as the inaugural vice president of research and economic development at Morgan State University. McCrary also served as vice president of research at the University of the District of Columbia

In October 2016 McCary was appointed to the National Science Board (NSB). He was made vice chair in July 2020. In August 2025, McCrary was named chair. McCrary was removed from the NSB in April 2026 by the Trump administration along with all other members.

== Personal life ==
McCrary is Catholic, a long-time member of the Knights of Columbus, and parishioner at Saint John the Evangelist in Columbia, Maryland.

== Awards and honors ==
- 1990 Most Promising Black Engineer, U.S. Black Engineer Magazine
- 1992 Pioneer of the Year Award, National Society of Black Engineers
- 1992 Outstanding Technical Achievement, Synergy Conference, AT&T Bell Laboratories
- 1996 Distinguished Lecturer, 60th College of Distinguished Lecturers, Sigma-Xi Scientific Society
- 1998 Equal Employment Opportunity Award, National Institute of Standards and Technology (NIST)
- 2000 Gold Medal, Department of Commerce
- 2002 Percy L. Julian Award
- 2005 Principal Professional Staff, Johns Hopkins University Applied Physics Laboratory
- 2006 Rays of Hope 2006 Award Recipient, Engineering/Science, 13th Annual Rays of Hope Awards
- 2006 Economic Development Achievement Award, Howard County Economic Development Authority,
- 2007 DVDA Hall of Fame Inductee, DVD Association
- 2007 DVD Association DVD Hall of Fame
- 2008 Innovator of Technology Award, Washington, D.C. Chapter, National Society of Black Engineers (NSBE)
- 2009 Fellow, African Scientific Institute
- 2011 Scientist of the Year, Black Engineer of the Year Awards
- 2011 Black Engineer of the Year Awards Scientist of the Year
- 2012 Mother Mary Lange Service Award, Archdiocese of Baltimore
- 2012 Diversity Recognition Award, The Johns Hopkins University Diversity Leadership Council
- 2012 Hall of Fame Inductee, Career Communications Group
- 2013 Hall of Fame Inductee, DeMatha Catholic High School
- 2014 Fellow, The American Chemical Society
- 2015 Alumni Achievement Award for Research Excellence, The Catholic University of America
- 2017 Distinguished Alumni Award, Howard University Graduate School
- 2022 Joseph Wharton Award, The Wharton Club of DC

== Select publications ==
- Lee, Kyong-Ho; Slattery, Oliver; Lu, Richang; Tang, Xiao; McCrary, Victor (2002). "The State of the Art and Practice in Digital Preservation". Journal of Research of the National Institute of Standards and Technology. 107 (1): 93–106. doi:10.6028/jres.107.010. ISSN 1044-677X. PMC 4865277. PMID 27446721.
- McCaulley, J. A.; McCrary, V. R.; Donnelly, V. M. (1989). "Laser-induced decomposition of triethylgallium and trimethylgallium adsorbed on gallium arsenide(100)". The Journal of Physical Chemistry. 93 (3): 1148–1158. doi:10.1021/j100340a026. ISSN 0022-3654.
- Lee, Kyong-Ho; Guttenberg, Nicholas; McCrary, Victor (2002-07-01). "Standardization aspects of eBook content formats". Computer Standards & Interfaces. 24 (3): 227–239. doi:10.1016/S0920-5489(02)00032-6. ISSN 0920-5489.
