= Treva Brown =

American chemist

- Born: Baton Rouge, Louisiana
- Education: Louisiana State University (BS); University of New Orleans (PhD)
- Occupation: Chemist
- Employer: United States Naval Research Laboratory
- Awards: Winifred Burks-Houck Professional Leadership Award

Treva Brown is an American chemist and STEM advocate who specializes in microbial corrosion on Navy ships.

== Early life and education ==
Brown is a native of Baton Rouge, Louisiana, attending and graduating Baton Rouge Magnet High School. Brown credits the mentoring received from a physics teacher for persuading her to study science, stating that "as a young Black girl, I never thought I deserved a spot at the table when it came to being an integral part of the scientific community".

In 2011, Brown earned her Bachelor of Science from Louisiana State University followed by her PhD in chemistry from University of New Orleans in 2017.

== Career ==
Brown joined the United States Naval Research Laboratory at the Stennis Space Center in 2018. She studies organisms that contribute to corrosion on metal and microbial corrosion on Navy ships as well as biodegradation and corrosion mechanisms. Brown also helped investigate a fungi that caused deterioration in military tents forcing the tents to collapse.

Brown is a member of the Alpha Kappa Alpha sorority and the chemistry fraternity Alpha Chi Sigma.

== Advocacy ==
Brown is an advocate of Science, Technology, Engineering, and Mathematics, having organized outreach events for elementary and college level students. She cites the value of introducing young students to a scientist "who looks like them" in her outreach activities.

=== Beauty pageants ===
Brown has been the winner of several beauty pageants, including Miss Black Louisiana, Miss Black Empowerment Louisiana, and Miss Black St. Tammany Parish. Brown cites these pageants as a "means to an end", allowing her to engage with minority communities and promote the topic of science.

== Awards and honors ==
- In 2017, Brown received the Winifred Burks-Houck Professional Leadership Award
- In 2021, Brown received the Women of Color in STEM Community Service Award
- In 2025, Brown received the Young Leadership Council Role Model Award which honors "business, community, and civic leaders"
