= James C. Letton =

American chemist

James Carey Letton (June 9, 1933 – March 26, 2013) was an American organic chemist known for his work in pharmaceutical chemistry. He was named the first African American member of P&G's Victor Mills Society. He held a number of patents, including developing the fat substitute Olestra.

== Early life and education ==
James Carey Letton was born on June 9, 1933, in Paris, Kentucky, where he was also raised. In 1955, He received his B.S. from Kentucky State University in Chemistry. In 1956, James married his wife Rosaline Stovall. In 1961, he relocated to Chicago, where he worked as a process chemist, specializing in steroids and cholesterol derivatives. In 1970, Letton pursued and earned his Ph.D. in Pharmaceutical Organic Chemistry from the University of Illinois. As his career progressed, he returned to Kentucky State University, where he began teaching and conducting research and later became the chair of the Chemistry department.

== Career ==
After leaving academia in 1975, he joined Procter & Gamble. While working at P&G, he improved their laundry detergent products. After that, he joined the research group that created Olestra. Letton also served as president of Kentucky State University's alumni association from 1979 to 1984.

Letton held numerous patents for innovations such as the Process for Preparing Alkyl Glycosides and the Process for the Preparation of Mono-Condensation Derivatives of Adipic Acid. His research, which spanned both medical and chemical fields, earned him the Percy L. Julian Award in 1989, in recognition of his outstanding contributions to pure and applied research in science and engineering. Along with a number of other awards, in 1989, he was also awarded the distinguished alumni citation from the National Association for Equal Opportunities in Education. In 1992, Letton was selected to P&G's Victor Mills Society, where he made history as the first African American member. Letton worked at P&G until his retirement in 1995.

Letton died on March 26, 2013, in Springdale, Ohio.
