= Moshe Havlin =

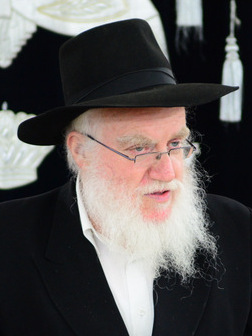
Moshe Havlin

Rabbi Moshe Havlin (Hebrew: משה הבלין; born 1948 in Jerusalem) is the Chief Rabbi of southern Israeli town of Kiryat Gat. Since March 2012 he is also the interim Rabbi of Sderot.

He is the chairman of the local Chabad Yeshiva, replacing Rabbi Shalom Dov Wolpo. He is also the leader of the local Chabad Community and the religious adviser of the Mayor of Kiryat Gat. He is considered to be an orthodox rabbi, and he supported the closure of the only Cinema theatre in Kiryat Gat in 2007.
