= Sarah Havlin =

Sarah Havlin is a solicitor from Belfast, with a background in employment law and employment relations. She is the first woman to be appointed to the role of Certification Officer of Northern Ireland, the regulator of trade unions and employer associations. She served as a Parades Commissioner for Northern Ireland, as Parliamentary Boundary Commissioner for Northern Ireland, and on the Independent Press Standards Authority. She was also appointed as the Local Government Boundary Commissioner for Northern Ireland, and in 2023 became the Chairman of The Industrial Court of Northern Ireland, the tribunal which adjudicates on applications about legal recognition and derecognition of trade unions for collective bargaining purposes. She is also the first Scottish Pubs Code Adjudicator

== Life ==
Sarah Havlin is a solicitor by profession, and studied law in Belfast. She lives in Bangor, County Down. Her legal background is in employment law and employment relations. She was appointed by the Northern Ireland Secretary of State as a Parades Commissioner for Northern Ireland in 2013. In 2015 she was appointed as Parliamentary Boundary Commissioner for Northern Ireland in accordance with Schedule 1 of the Parliamentary Constituencies Act 1986. In 2017, she was appointed as an independent standards investigator by the U.K press regulation authority, the Independent Press Standards Authority.

In 2015, she became the first woman to be appointed to the role of Certification Officer of Northern Ireland, the regulator of trade unions and employer associations.

In June 2020 Sarah Havlin was appointed as the Local Government Boundary Commissioner for Northern Ireland by the Minister for Communities of Northern Ireland.

In 2023 Sarah Havlin became the Chairman of The Industrial Court of Northern Ireland, the tribunal which adjudicates on applications about legal recognition and derecognition of trade unions for collective bargaining purposes.

Havlin has lectured in law at the Open University and was a visiting tutor at the Institute of Professional Legal Studies (IPLS) at Queen’s University Belfast. She is a Fellow of the Irish Institute of Boston College, Massachusetts.
