= William M. Jackson (chemist) =

William Morgan Jackson
- Born: September 24, 1936 (age 89); Birmingham, Alabama
- Education: Catholic University of America; Morehouse College
- Known for: Astrochemistry; Physical chemistry Free radicals NOBCChE
- Scientific career
- Workplaces: National Institute of Standards and Technology; University of Pittsburgh; Goddard Space Flight Center; Howard University; University of California, Davis

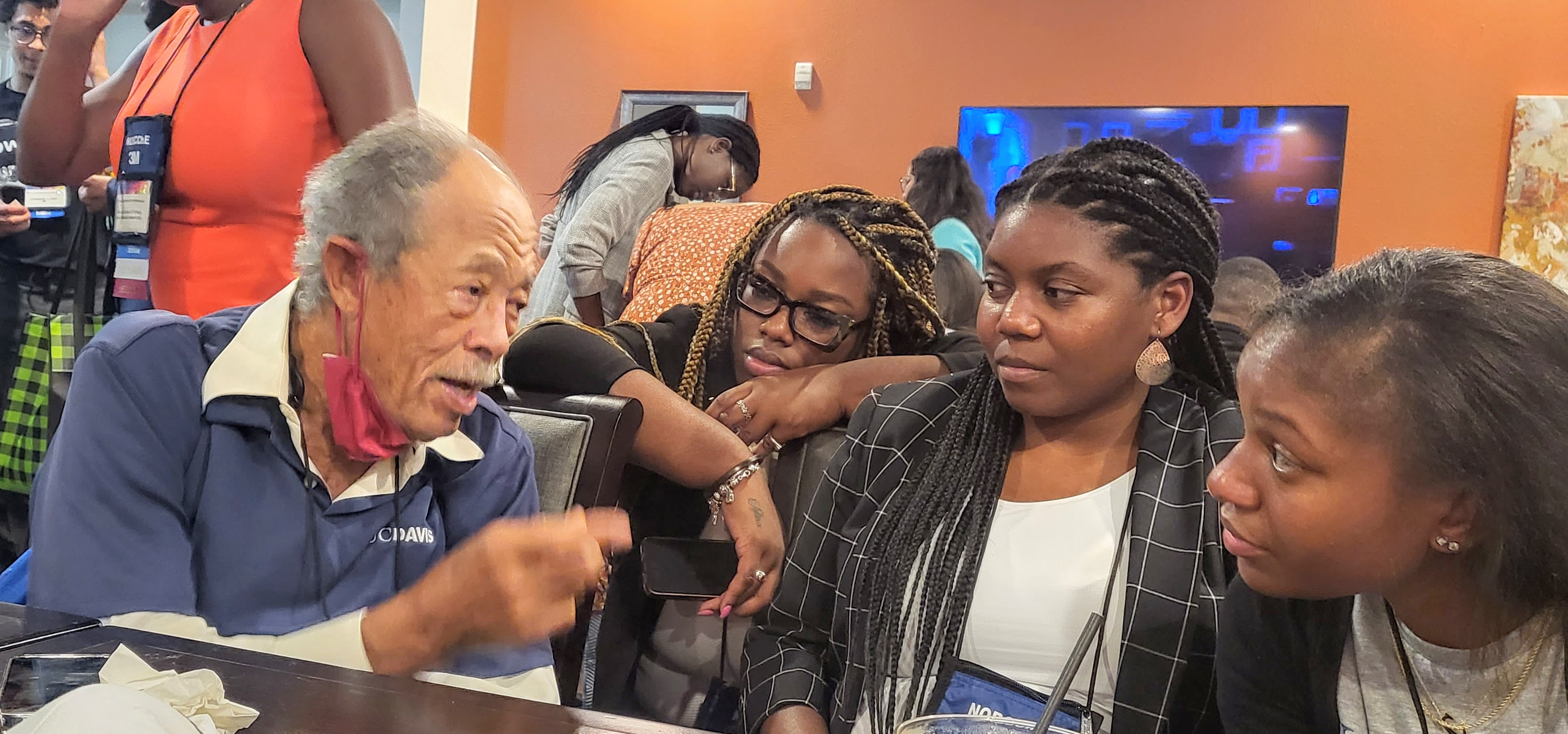
Bill Jackson at 2022 NOBCChE Meeting

William Morgan Jackson (born September 24, 1936) is a Distinguished Research and Emeritus Professor of Chemistry at University of California, Davis and pioneer in the field of astrochemistry. His work considers cometary astrochemistry and the development of laser photochemistry to understand planetary atmospheres. He is a Fellow of the American Association for the Advancement of Science, the American Physical Society and the American Chemical Society. In addition to contributing research work, he is notable as a mentor and advocate for increasing minority participation in science, and was one of the founders of the National Organization for the Professional Advancement of Black Chemists and Chemical Engineers (NOBCChE).

In 2019, he was awarded the Astronomical Society of the Pacific Arthur B.C. Walker II Award for his research and commitment to promoting diversity. In 2021, he was awarded the American Physical Society Julius Edgar Lilienfeld Prize for outstanding contributions to fundamental chemical physics and spectroscopy associated with asteroids and comets, and for exemplary teaching at both the undergraduate and graduate levels, as well as lifelong service and inspiration to a diverse community.

== Early life ==
Jackson was born in Birmingham, Alabama to William Morgan and Claudia H. Jackson on September 24, 1936. He grew up in a segregated society and spent part of his childhood in Dynamite Hill, an area in Birmingham that the Ku Klux Klan frequently bombed during the Civil rights movement. His father, a Tuskegee University graduate, owned the Apex Cab Company and also taught auto mechanics at Parker High School, whilst his mother, a graduate of Santa Barbara Junior College, worked for the US government. At the age of nine, Jackson contracted polio and had to spend a year out of school.

== Education ==
After completing tenth grade, Jackson joined Morehouse College as an early entrance student. He was awarded a full scholarship. At first Jackson considered majoring in mathematics, but decided to study chemistry after meeting Henry Cecil McBay. He graduated in 1956 and applied to several graduate schools, including Northwestern University and Purdue University. He received a response from Northwestern, who said that they had already fulfilled their three fellowships for African American students. Eventually he moved Washington, D.C., where he got a job and lived with his cousin. He studied at the Catholic University of America, where he was awarded a postgraduate research fellowship. During his doctoral studies, he worked in the Harry Diamond Laboratories, where he studied molten salt compounds. During the final year of his PhD, Jackson's wife became pregnant, and Jackson took time out of graduate school to earn money. During this time he worked at the National Institute of Standards and Technology. He returned to the Catholic University of America where he studied gasoline additives. After earning his PhD in 1961, he joined the Lockheed Martin, where he worked on formaldehyde resins and ways to protect missiles as they reenter the Atmosphere of Earth. He returned to the National Institute of Standards and Technology as a postdoctoral researcher, studying how radiant energy impacted chemical structures. He investigated how radiation impacted the coating applied to space vehicles.

== Research and careers ==
In 1964, Jackson joined the Goddard Space Flight Center. It was here that he became interested in the origins of free radicals in comets. While at the Goddard Space Flight Center he proposed to use the International Ultraviolet Explorer satellite to look for comets. Using the Haystack Observatory, Jackson made measurements of water emission in comets. He joined the faculty at the University of Pittsburgh in 1969, where he spent a year researching and teaching. At the University of Pittsburgh, he worked with Wade Fite and Ted Brackman on the detection of electron impact on molecules using mass spectrometry. A year later he returned to Goddard, where he developed a system to detect free radicals using laser beams.

In 1974, one of Jackson's colleagues, a professor of chemistry at Howard University, died suddenly. Jackson agreed to teach his course for the rest of the term and was subsequently appointed to a joint position in chemistry and physics. Here he began working on laser-induced fluorescence (LIF) to study the rovibronic coupling in cyano radicals. He was the first person to demonstrate LIF could be used to study molecular photodissociation. He primarily studied comets using satellites ground-based telescopes, using experimental data and theoretical predictions to establish how the free radicals inside comets form. Despite having left Goddard Space Flight Center, Jackson served as team leader for the International Ultraviolet Explorer telescope, which observed Halley's Comet. He joined University of California, Davis in 1985 and was promoted to Distinguished Professor in 1998. The Jackson laboratory ("Jackson's Photon Crusaders") developed tunable lasers that could be used to detect and characterize free radicals. These included excimer lasers, nitrogen-pumped lasers and an Alexandrite laser. By building laser systems in the laboratory, Jackson helped to establish the excited states of molecules that are present in planetary atmospheres. The experiments consisted of one laser for the photodissociation of the parent molecule, and another laser to excite the free radical into an excited state. When the excited molecule fluoresced back to the ground state, the fluorescence was captured in a photomultiplier tube. He has investigated the photochemistry of carbon monoxide, nitrogen and carbon dioxide. His laser systems exploit resonant four-wave mixing, which allows them to photodissociate gases observed in planetary atmospheres. He also showed that it is possible to ionise the resulting atomic fragments using a velocity imaging time-of-flight mass spectrometer.

In 1996 The Planetary Society named asteroid 1081 EE37 as (4322) Billjackson in his honour. He served as Chair of the Department of Chemistry at University of California, Davis in 2000. He retired in 2006, but has continued to research and recruit students. In 2013, he was made the Emile A. Dickenson Professor at University of California, Davis. In 2019 the Journal of Physical Chemistry dedicated a special issue to Jackson.

== Academic service and advocacy ==
Jackson has campaigned for equity, diversity and inclusion in science since he started his career. He was one of the founders of the National Organization for the Professional Advancement of Black Chemists and Chemical Engineers (NOBCChE). The organization began to promote and award minority scientists and engineers, as well as encouraging high school students to consider studying science or engineering. It was supported by Ted Kennedy and the National Science Foundation. Jackson served as NOBCChE's first treasurer from 1973. He stated that he was inspired to start the NOBCChE after attending a meeting of the American Chemical Society, and seeing no African Americans there. He has served in various capacities for the NOBCChE, attending every annual meeting other than one (San Diego, 1999) in protest of the 1996 California Proposition 209. He provided evidence to Congress in an effort to increase research funding to historically black colleges and universities. When he arrived at U.C. Davis, only two students from underrepresented minorities had ever earned chemistry PhDs there. While at UC Davis, he secured funding from the Alfred P. Sloan Foundation and increased the department's minority student population to about 15% of the academic cohort. Jackson was known for bringing students and researchers to his laboratory "who were the stones the builders rejected, and he made them the cornerstones for future scientific research".

== Awards and honors ==
His awards and honours include;

- 1986 NOBCChE Percy L. Julian Award
- 1989 Guggenheim Fellow
- 1991 Catholic University of America Alumni Award
- 1995 Elected Fellow of the American Physical Society
- 1996 Alexander von Humboldt Foundation Research Award
- 1997 American Association for the Advancement of Science Lifetime Mentor Award
- 2002, 2003 Sigma Xi Distinguished Lecturer
- 2004 Elected Fellow of the American Association for the Advancement of Science
- 2010 Elected Fellow of the American Chemical Society
- 2011 Morehouse College Bennie Trailblazer Award
- 2015 University of California, Davis Emeritus Award
- 2019 Astronomical Society of the Pacific Arthur B.C. Walker II Award
- 2021 American Physical Society Julius Edgar Lilienfeld Prize

== Selected publications ==
His publications include;

- Jackson, Wiiliam M. (1954). "A method for growing barium titanate single crystals". Journal of the American Chemical Society. 76 (3): 940–941. Bibcode:1954JAChS..76..940R. doi:10.1021/ja01632a107.
- Jackson, William M.; Conley, Robert T. (1964). "High temperature oxidative degradation of phenol–formaldehyde polycondensates". Journal of Applied Polymer Science. 8 (5): 2163–2193. Bibcode:1964JAPS....8.2163J. doi:10.1002/app.1964.070080516.
- Jackson, Wiiliam M. (8 July 2021). "A Black Scientist's Retrospective of His Life in Physical Chemistry". The Journal of Physical Chemistry A. 125 (26): 5711–5717. Bibcode:2021JPCA..125.5711J. doi:10.1021/acs.jpca.1c05194. ISSN 1089-5639. PMID 34259000.
