= William Otis Lester =

American politician and school administrator

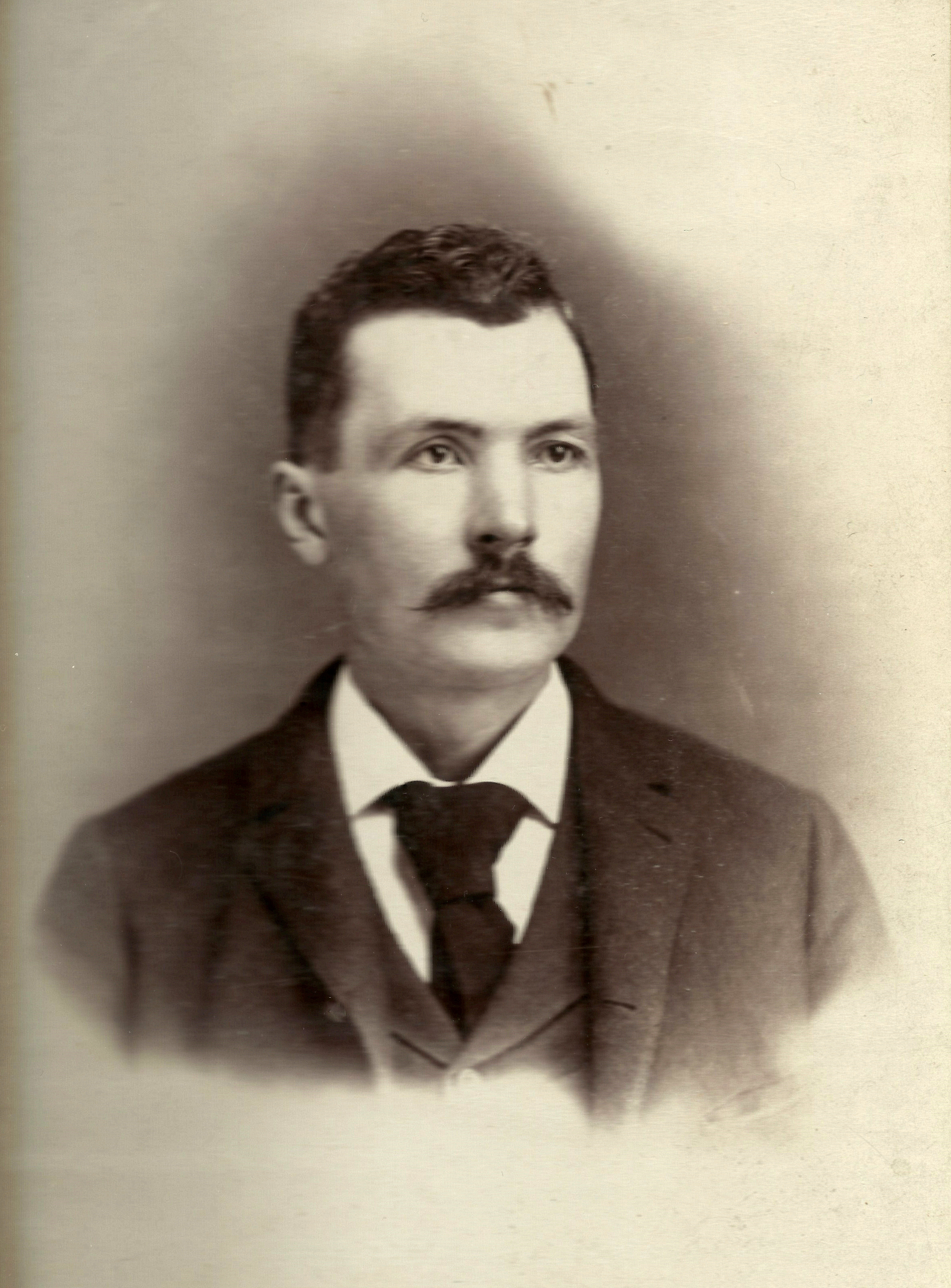
Wedding Portrait 1891

William Otis Lester (1864-1927) was an American politician and school administrator. He served as a member of the South Dakota House of Representatives from 1891 to 1892, representing the city of Hecla as an Independent. During this period, he also served as the editor of the Hecla Citizen newspaper.

He was born 10 February 1864 in Wisconsin and died 17 January 1927 in Washakie County, Wyoming.

Lester was married to Isabelle Osher on 1 November 1891, and they had seven children together. The couple moved to Minnesota and then to Wyoming in 1897. There they had a ranch and William acted as the Superintendent of Schools for Big Horn County from 1899 to 1905 and later held various other education-related roles. He was the second superintendent ever in that county and was widely known for his work in the local educational system. Lester was handicapped later in life after losing a leg.
