= Shlomo Havlin =

Israeli physicist

- שלמה הבלין
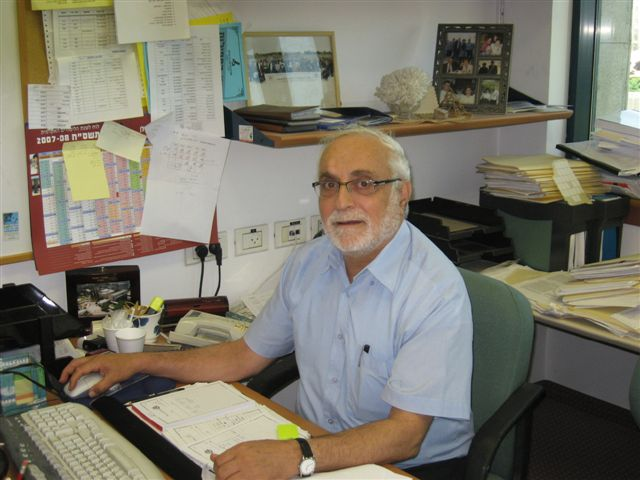
- Shlomo Havlin
- Born: July 21, 1942 (age 84)
- Citizenship: Israel
- Known for: Complex networks, Physical properties of disordered systems
- Awards: Israel Prize (2018); Rothschild Prize (2014); Lilienfeld Prize, APS (USA, 2010); Weizmann Prize (2009); Nicholson Medal, APS (USA, 2006)
- Scientific career
- Fields: Physics
- Workplaces: Bar-Ilan University

Shlomo Havlin (Hebrew: שלמה הבלין; born July 21, 1942) is a professor in the Department of Physics at Bar-Ilan University, Ramat-Gan, Israel. He served as President of the Israel Physical Society (1996–1999), Dean of Faculty of Exact Sciences (1999–2001), chairman, Department of Physics (1984–1988).

In 2018 he won the Israel Prize for his accomplishments in physics.

== Biography ==
Shlomo Havlin was born in Jerusalem, Israel (then part of The British Mandate of Palestine). He is named after his grandfather Rabbi Shlomo Zalman Havlin, founder of the Torat Emet yeshiva in Hebron. He is second cousins with Prof. Shlomo Zalman Havlin, founder of the Department of Information Studies and Librarianship at Bar-Ilan University. He graduated from Bar-Ilan and Tel-Aviv Universities with Highest Distinction. He obtained an academic position at Bar-Ilan University in 1972 where he became a full Professor in Physics at 1984. During 1978–1979 he was a Royal Society Visiting Fellow at the University of Edinburgh, where he worked with Professors William Cochran and Roger Cowley. In 1984 he became the Chair of the Physics Department at Bar-Ilan University until 1988. During 1983–1984 and 1989–1991, Havlin was a visiting scientist at NIH where he collaborated much with Drs. George Weiss, Ralph Nossal and other members of NIH. During 1984–1985 and 1991–1992 he was a visiting professor at Boston University, where he collaborated with Professor H. Eugene Stanley and many others. Between 2016 and 2019 Havlin was a visiting professor in Tokyo Institute of Technology, where he collaborated with Profs. Misako and Hideki Takayasu.

== Centers and research impact ==
Havlin established four Centers at Bar-Ilan, the Gonda-Goldschmiedt Medical Diagnostic Research Center (1994), the Minerva Center for Mesoscopics, Fractals and Neural Networks (1998), Science Beyond 2000 – Science Education Unit (1996) and Israel Science Foundation National Center for Complex Networks (2003). He was the President of the Israel Physical Society (1996–1999) and the Dean of the Faculty of Exact Sciences at Bar-Ilan University (1999–2001). Havlin had more than 200 graduate students and postdocs, and collaborated with more than 400 scientists around the globe. He published more than 700 articles and 11 books. He was in 2018 one of the two most cited Israel scientists. He is currently in the editorial board of several scientific journals: Fractals, Physica A, New Journal of Physics, Research Letters in Physics and co-editor of Europhysics Letters.

== Prizes and awards ==
Havlin obtained numerous prizes for his research, including the Landau Prize for Outstanding Research in Physics (1988), the Humboldt Award – Germany (1992), Prize for best scientific paper of 2000, Bar-Ilan University (2000) and Prize for best popular scientific paper Minister of Science, Israel (2002). He also obtained the Nicholson Medal of the American Physical Society (2006), the Chaim Weizmann Prize for Exact Sciences (2009), the Julius Edgar Lilienfeld Prize for outstanding contribution in physics (2010), the Rothschild Prize for Physical and Chemical Sciences (2014), an Honorary Professor, Beihang University, Beijing, China (2016), the Distinguished Scientist Award, Chinese Academy of Sciences (2017), the Order of the Star of Italy, President of Italy (2017) and the Israel Prize for Physics and Chemistry (2018).

Professor Havlin made many important contributions to science. The following are descriptions of his main contributions in randomness and complexity.

== Main contributions ==
Disordered systems that are self-similar on a broad range of length scales are ubiquitous and often modeled by percolation-type models. The laws that describe transport processes or chemical reactions in these systems are significantly different from those in homogeneous systems. The earlier works of Prof. Havlin, where he discovered several of these important anomalies, had an enormous impact on the development of the whole field and are summarized in the monograph "Diffusion and Reactions in Fractals and Disordered Systems" that he wrote together with his former graduate student Daniel ben-Avraham (Cambridge University Press, 2000). The book describes the anomalous physical laws discovered during 1980–2000 in fractals and disordered systems, many of them by Havlin and his collaborators. His review article (Adv. in Phys. (1987)) was cited more than 1100 times and was chosen by the journal's editors to be published again (Adv. in Phys. (2002)). In 2000, Havlin and his student Reuven Cohen, together with Daniel ben-Avraham developed a novel percolation-type approach and derived the first theory on the stability of realistic complex networks such as the Internet under random breakdown (Phys. Rev. Lett. 85, 4626 (2000)) and intentional attacks (Phys. Rev. Lett. 86, 3682 (2001)). This study is particularly useful for optimizing the stability of networks against intentional attacks and viruses. They also derived a novel result about the "small world" nature of complex networks and found that the diameter of scale free networks is significantly smaller and therefore called them "ultrasmall worlds" (Phys. Rev. Lett. 90, 58701 (2003)). Since 2010, Havlin and collaborators have focused heavily on interdependent networks. His paper with collaborators developed the percolation theory of network of networks (Nature, 464, 08932 (2010)) and initiated the current active research field of networks. In 2014, he introduced with collaborators the concept of recovery in percolation theory (Nature Physics, 10, 3438 (2014); Nature Comm., 2016).
