= National Organization for the Professional Advancement of Black Chemists and Chemical Engineers =

U.S. professional organization

- Founder: Lloyd Ferguson; Joseph Cannon; William M. Jackson; William Guillory; Henry C. McBay; Charles Merideth; James Porter
- Type: Scientific and engineering society
- Headquarters: 8221 Ritchie Hwy, Suite 202, Pasadena, MD 21122
- Key people: Tyrslai Williams-Carter (President); LaRico Treadwell (President-Elect)
- Website: www.nobcche.org

The National Organization for the Professional Advancement of Black Chemists and Chemical Engineers or NOBCChE (pronounced No-be-shay) is a nonprofit, professional organization. NOBCChE's goal is to increase the number of minorities in science, technology, and engineering fields. The organization accomplishes this by creating bonds with professionals working at science-related companies and faculty at local school districts in order to get more minorities to pursue a career in science and engineering fields. NOBCChE focuses on establishing diversity programs for the professional development of young kids and to spread knowledge in science and engineering. NOBCChE chapters can be found nationwide.

== History ==
NOBCChE was co-founded in 1972 by a group of chemists and chemical engineers. Initially, the organization was financially aided by the Haas Community Fund and Drexel University. After receiving positive feedback and interest from other black chemists and chemical engineers, the founders decided to expand on their idea and set up a structured idea of what they wanted the society to emphasize. Two years later, the first national meeting was held in New Orleans. At the conference, black chemists and chemical engineers found that they could discuss career-related issues with others who were in similar fields. Today, the national conference features various workshops, research presentations, and high school science bowls. NOBCChE also presents the Percy L. Julian Award, given to African-American scientists who have made significant contributions to the areas of pure or applied research in science or engineering.

=== Founders of NOBCChE ===
- Joseph N. Cannon, Chemical engineer and professor - Howard University
- Lloyd Ferguson, Chemist and professor - California State University
- William M. Jackson, Chemist and professor - Howard University
- William Guillory, Chemist and professor - Drexel University
- Henry C. McBay, Chemist and professor - Morehouse College
- Charles Merideth, Chemist and chancellor of the Atlanta University Center, Inc.
- James Porter, Chemical engineer and professor - MIT

== Presidents ==
The President has the overall responsibility for affecting the objectives of NOBCChE, oversees the day-to-day activities of the organization, and is the official representative of the organization. For over 45 years, professionals from industry, academia, and government have volunteered their time to lead the organization in the mission of encouraging education and careers in STEM for people of color. Each NOBCChE President develops his or her own set of goals with corresponding initiatives and events.

	Year	National president	Affiliation*
1	1974–1980	William Guillory	Drexel University
2	1981–1984	John B. Sapp Jr.	Texas Southern University
3	1984–1986	Edward D Walton	US Naval Academy
4	1986–1989	Phillip Merchant	Exxon Mobil
5	1989–1993	James Evans	Lawrence Livermore National Laboratory
6	1993–2001	Winifred Burks-Houck	Lawrence Livermore National Laboratory
7	2001–2003	Ella L. Davis	PQ Corporation
8	2003-2005	Marquita Qualls	GlaxoSmithKline
9	2005–2007	Joseph Francisco	Purdue University
10	2007–2013	Victor McCrary	Johns Hopkins Applied Physics Laboratory
11	2013–2015	Judson Haynes III	Procter & Gamble
12	2015–2017	Talitha Hampton	AstraZeneca
13	2017–2019	Emanuel Waddell	University of Alabama in Huntsville
14	2019–2021	Murrell Godfrey	University of Mississippi
15	2021–2023	Renã A. S. Robinson	Vanderbilt University
16	2023–2025	Bridgette Shannon	3M
17	2025-Present	Tyrslai M. Williams-Carter	Louisiana State University

*Affiliation at the time of election
