= African-American scientists and technicians on the Manhattan Project =

African-American scientists and technicians on the Manhattan Project held a small number of positions among the several hundred scientists and technicians involved. Nonetheless, African-American men and women made important contributions to the Manhattan Project during World War II. At the time, their work was shrouded in secrecy, intentionally compartmentalized and decontextualized so that almost no one knew the purpose or intended use of what they were doing.

As government documents have been declassified and historians have examined archives and collected oral histories, the work of people including physical chemist William Jacob Knox Jr., chemist Lloyd Quarterman, physicist Carolyn Parker, physicist and mass spectrometrist Robert Johnson Omohundro, and physicist and mathematician Jesse Ernest Wilkins Jr. is being recognized. They contributed to the theoretical understanding of nuclear physics (Wilkins), the extraction and processing of the fissionable uranium isotope, Uranium-235 (Knox, Quarterman), the use of polonium as an initiator (Parker), and the development of scientific instruments to detect radioactive materials and measure radiation (Omohundro).

The small number of African Americans employed as scientists and technicians is an indication of the structural discrimination that affected and continues to affect African Americans. The realities faced by African American scientists and technicians varied with location. No African Americans lived at Los Alamos, New Mexico, a primary site of the Manhattan Project, prior to 1947. At southern research facilities like Clinton Engineer Works in Oak Ridge, Tennessee, segregation and discriminatory policies were strictly enforced. For example, white couples were allowed to live together, while black couples were not. Conditions at the Hanford Engineer Works in Hanford, Washington were slightly better. Conditions improved at Columbia University in New York City and at the Metallurgical Laboratory at the University of Chicago in Chicago, Illinois, but African-American scientists still faced both structural barriers and overt incidents of racism.

Over time, researchers have begun to examine the role of African Americans in the Manhattan Project, the ways in which technology and ethnic identity intersect, and the variety of ways in which African Americans viewed their involvement.

== Background ==
The Manhattan Project was a massive research and development initiative led by the United States during World War II, to design and build the first atomic weapons. The project was coordinated under the direction of Major General Leslie Groves of the U.S. Army Corps of Engineers. Research and production of fissile material and weapons development took place at more than thirty sites across the United States, the United Kingdom, and Canada. Key sites included SAM Laboratories at Columbia University, where researchers considered the theoretical foundations, feasibility and design issues of dealing with atomic particles while carrying out experiments with the Columbia cyclotron; the Clinton Engineer Works at Oak Ridge, Tennessee, where researchers developed methods for uranium processing, enrichment, and plutonium production; the Metallurgical Laboratory at the University of Chicago, where the first nuclear reactor was designed and built; the Hanford Engineer Works, where plutonium was produced and separated from uranium; and the Los Alamos Laboratory, where nuclear weapon development was carried out.

An estimated 130,000 Americans worked at secret facilities in the United States and Canada on the Manhattan Project between 1941 and 1946. Their jobs varied widely, from construction workers and clerks to theoretical physicists. The project was attended by an extreme level of secrecy: in 1945 Life magazine estimated that before the bombing of Hiroshima and Nagasaki, "Probably no more than a few dozen men in the entire country knew the full meaning of the Manhattan Project, and perhaps only a thousand others even were aware that work on atoms was involved."

The end of World War II brought with it the end of the Manhattan Project. The Atomic Energy Act was signed into law on August 1, 1946, creating the Atomic Energy Commission (AEC). It went into effect on January 1, 1947. Los Alamos became the Los Alamos National Laboratory, under AEC direction. The Chicago Metallurgical Laboratory was succeeded by the Argonne National Laboratory. A number of the African-American scientists and technicians continued to work at the Argonne National Laboratory, while others sought jobs in teaching and industry.

== Scientists and technicians ==
Several hundred scientists and technicians were involved in the Manhattan Project, of whom a few men and women were African-American. Once the project ceased to be a secret, publications like Ebony hailed African-American scientists and technicians as role models and "progressive heroes".

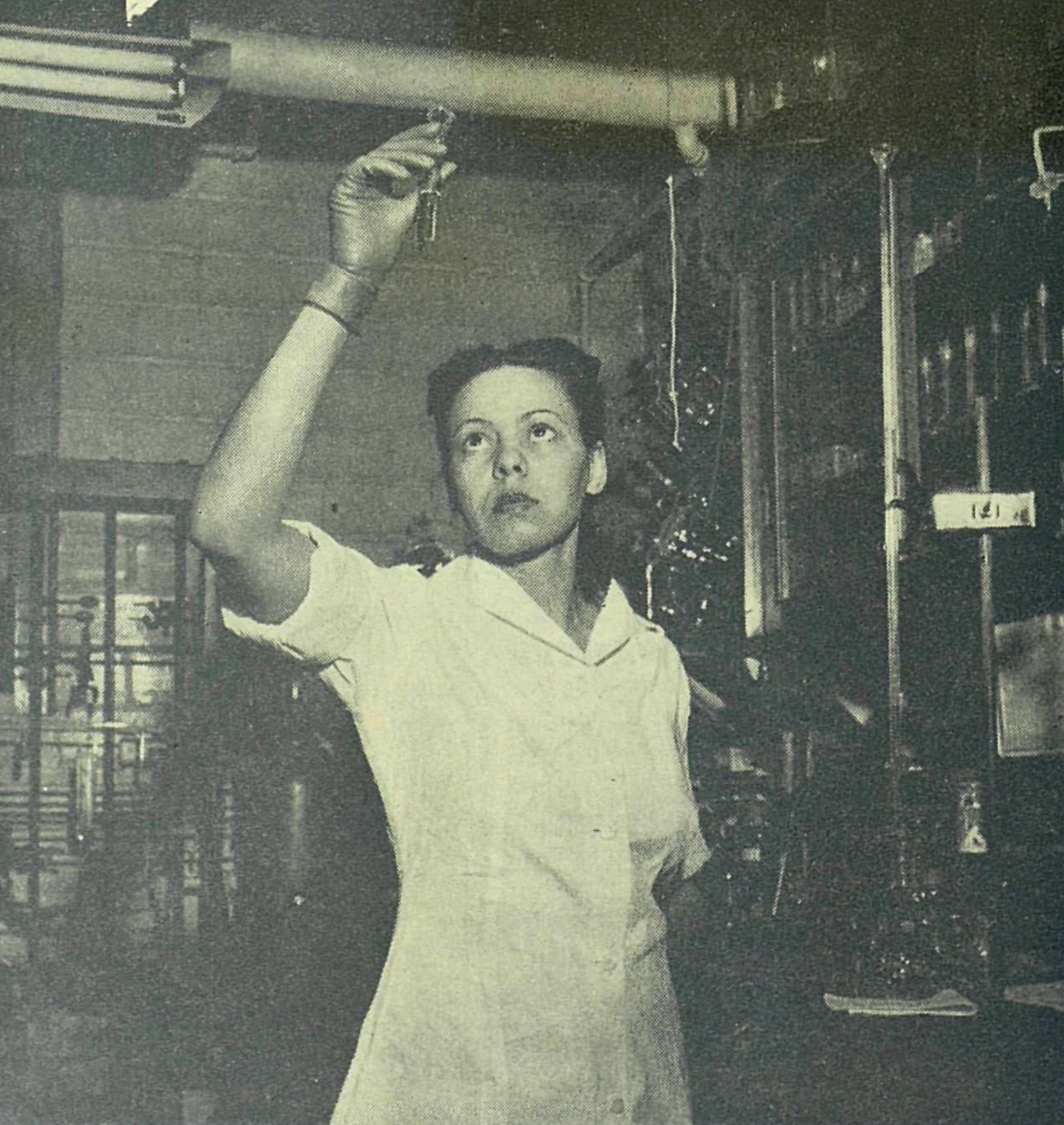
Blanche J. Lawrence

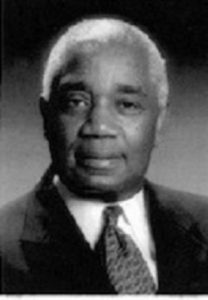
Benjamin Franklin Scott

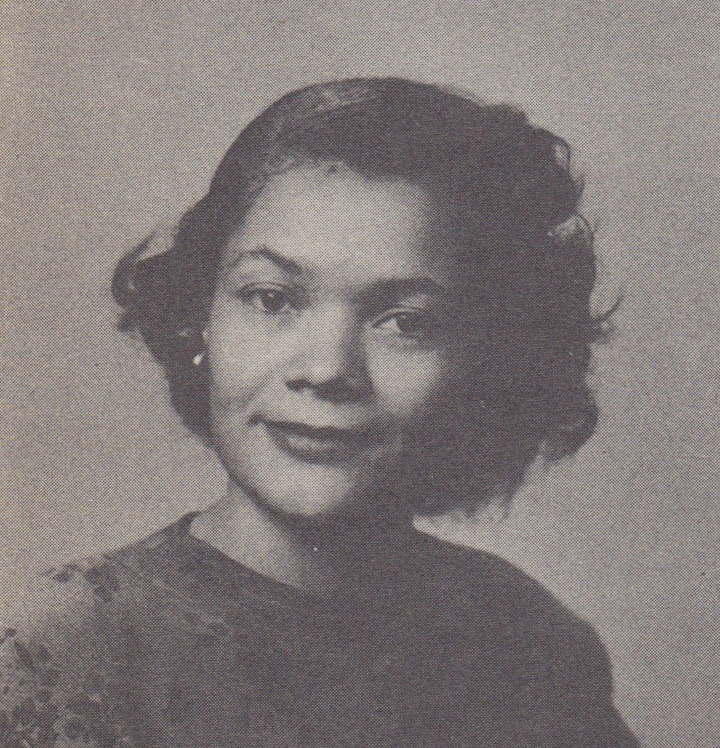
Carolyn Parker

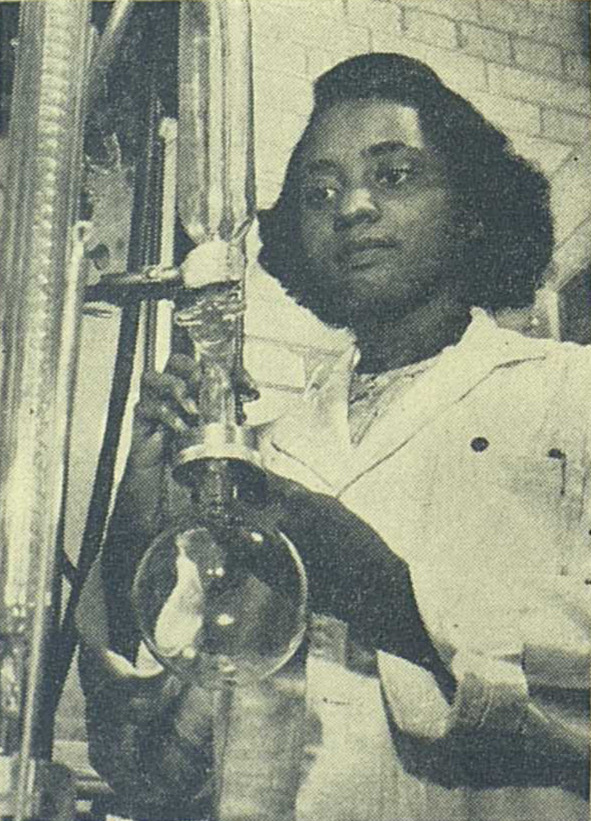
Cynthia Hall

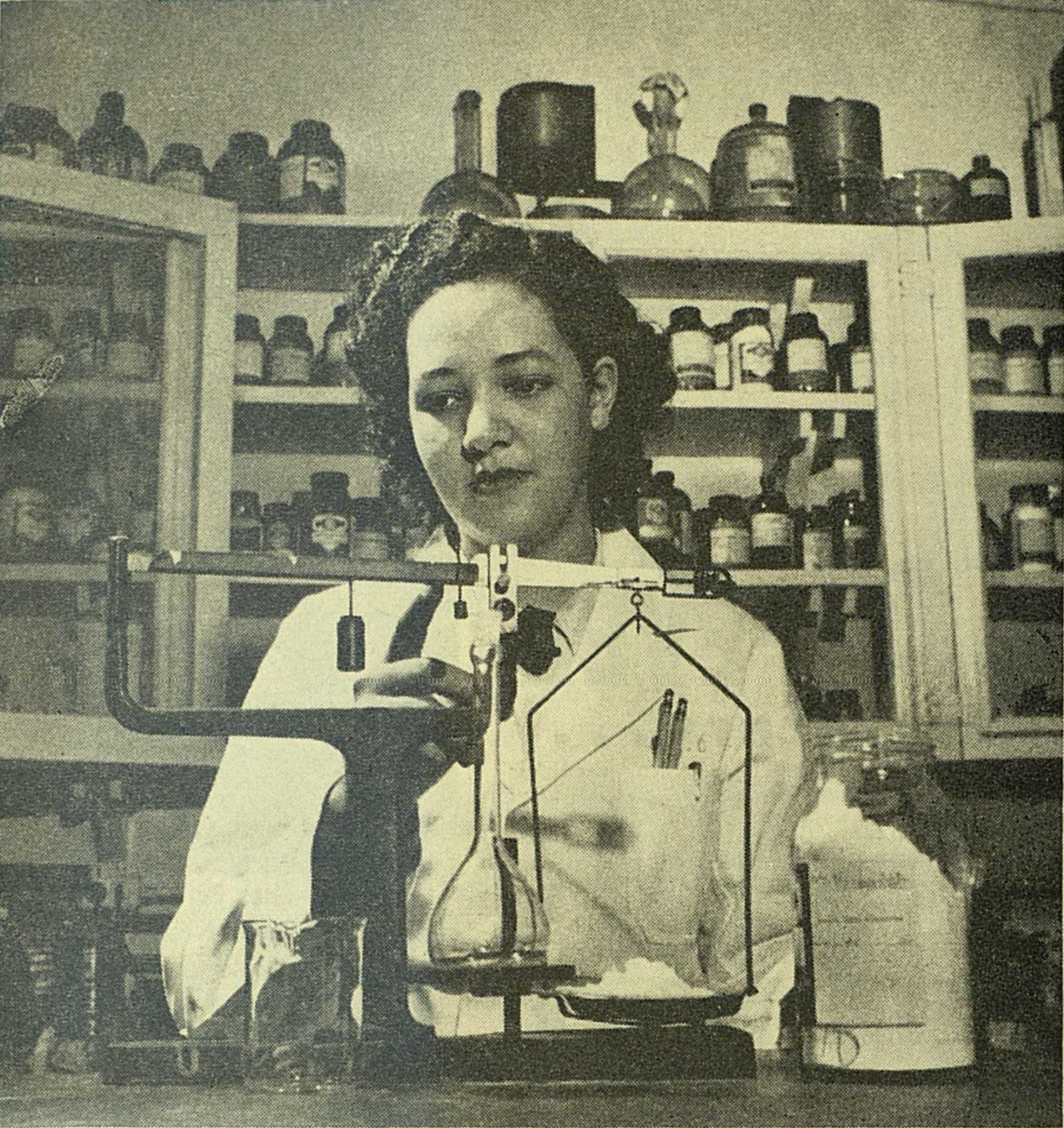
Ella Tyree

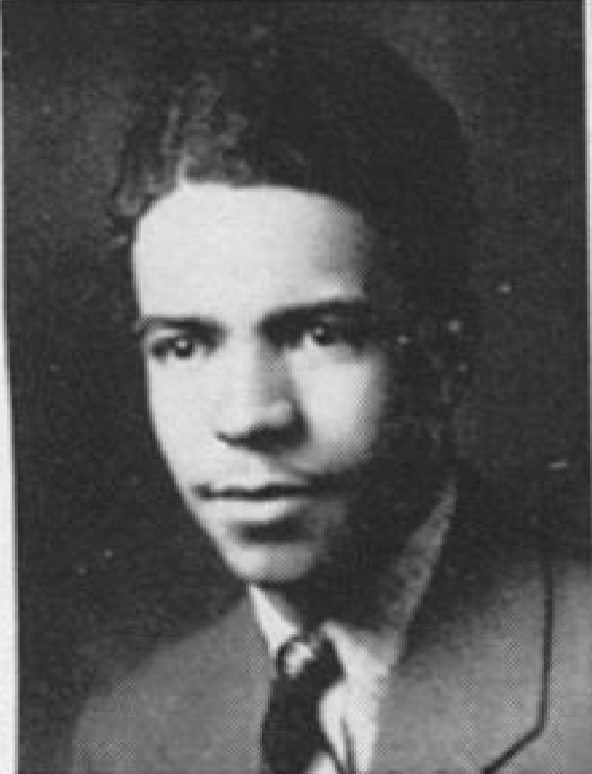
Jesse Ernest Wilkins Jr.

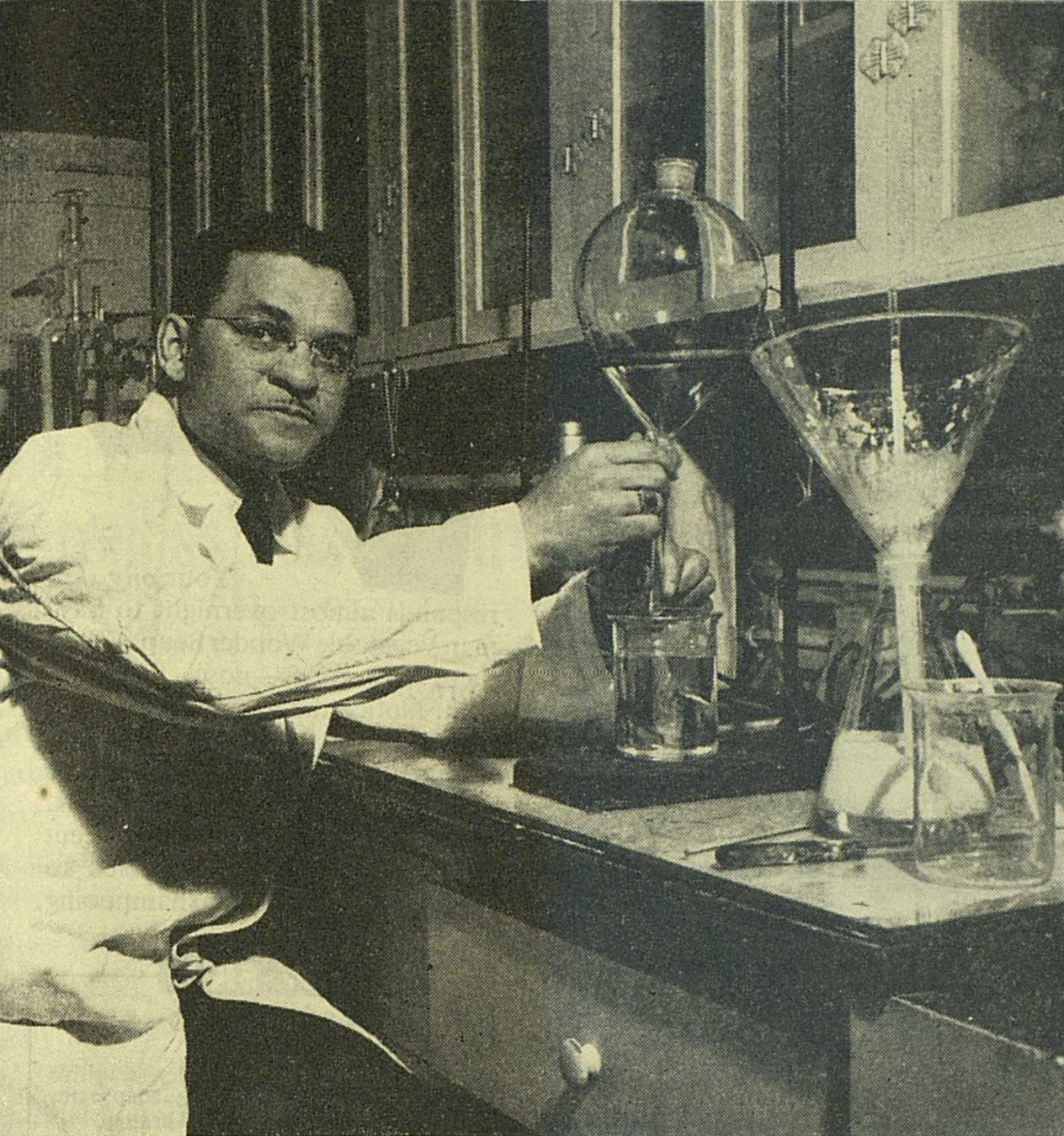
Harold B. Evans

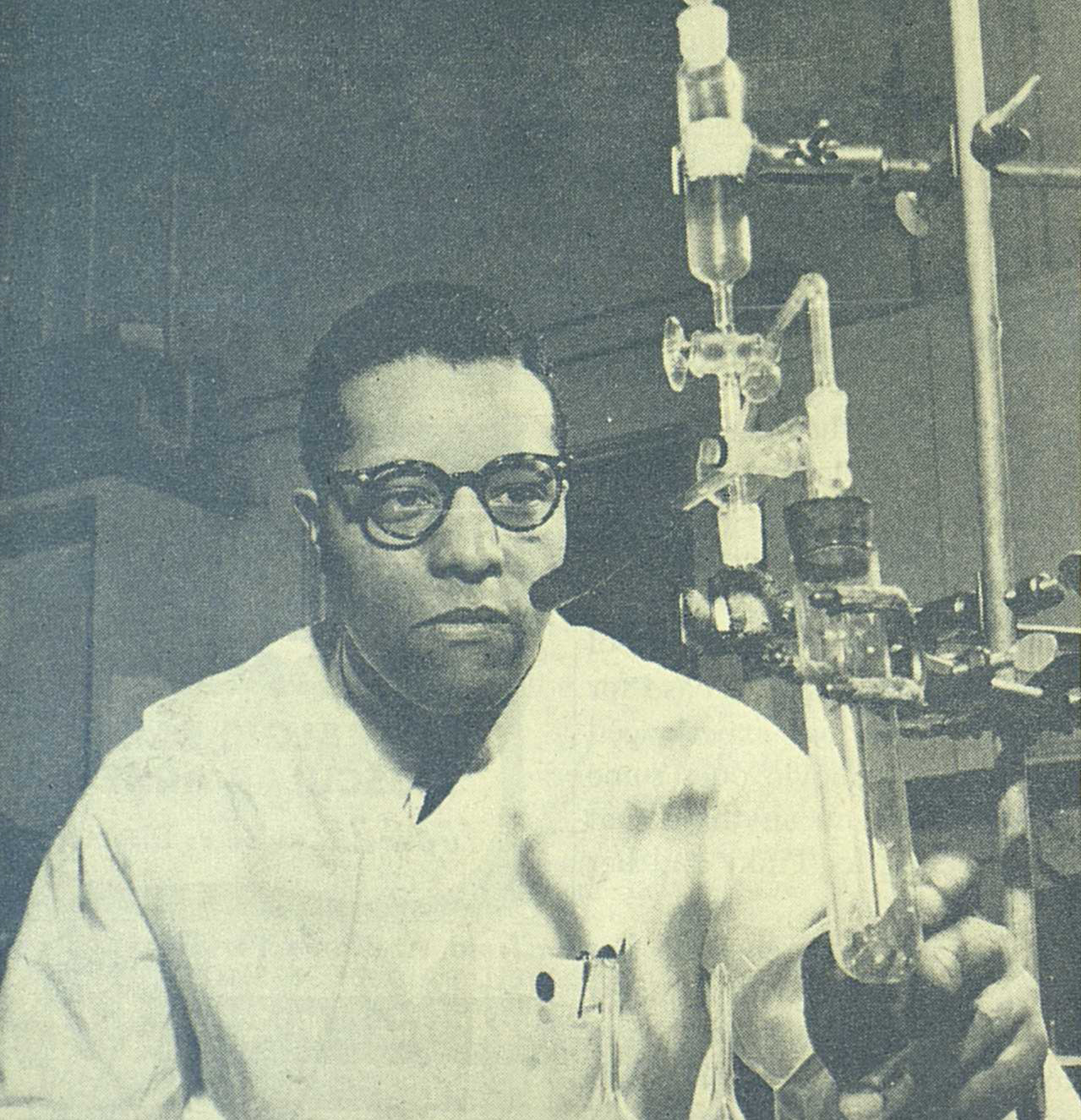
Herschel D. Wallace

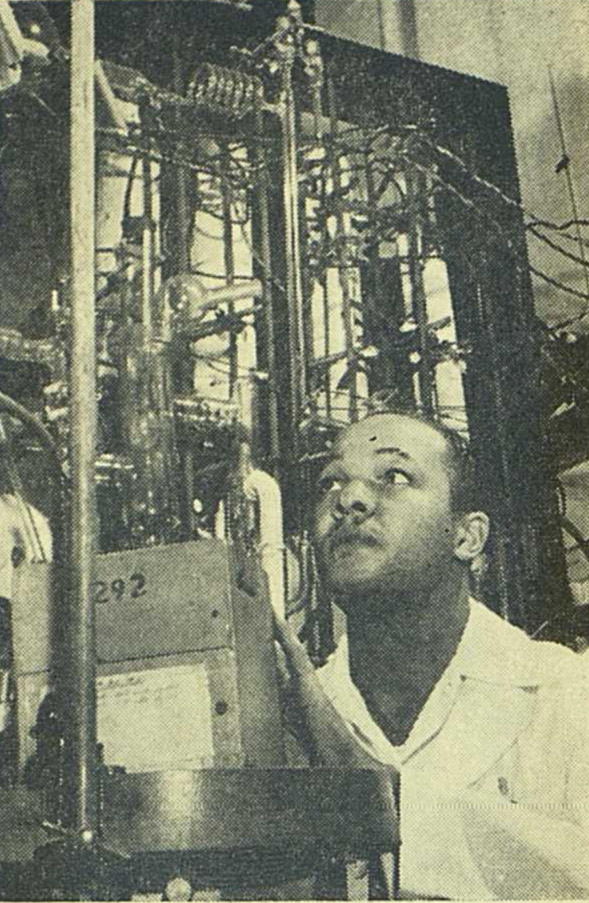
Lloyd A. Quarterman

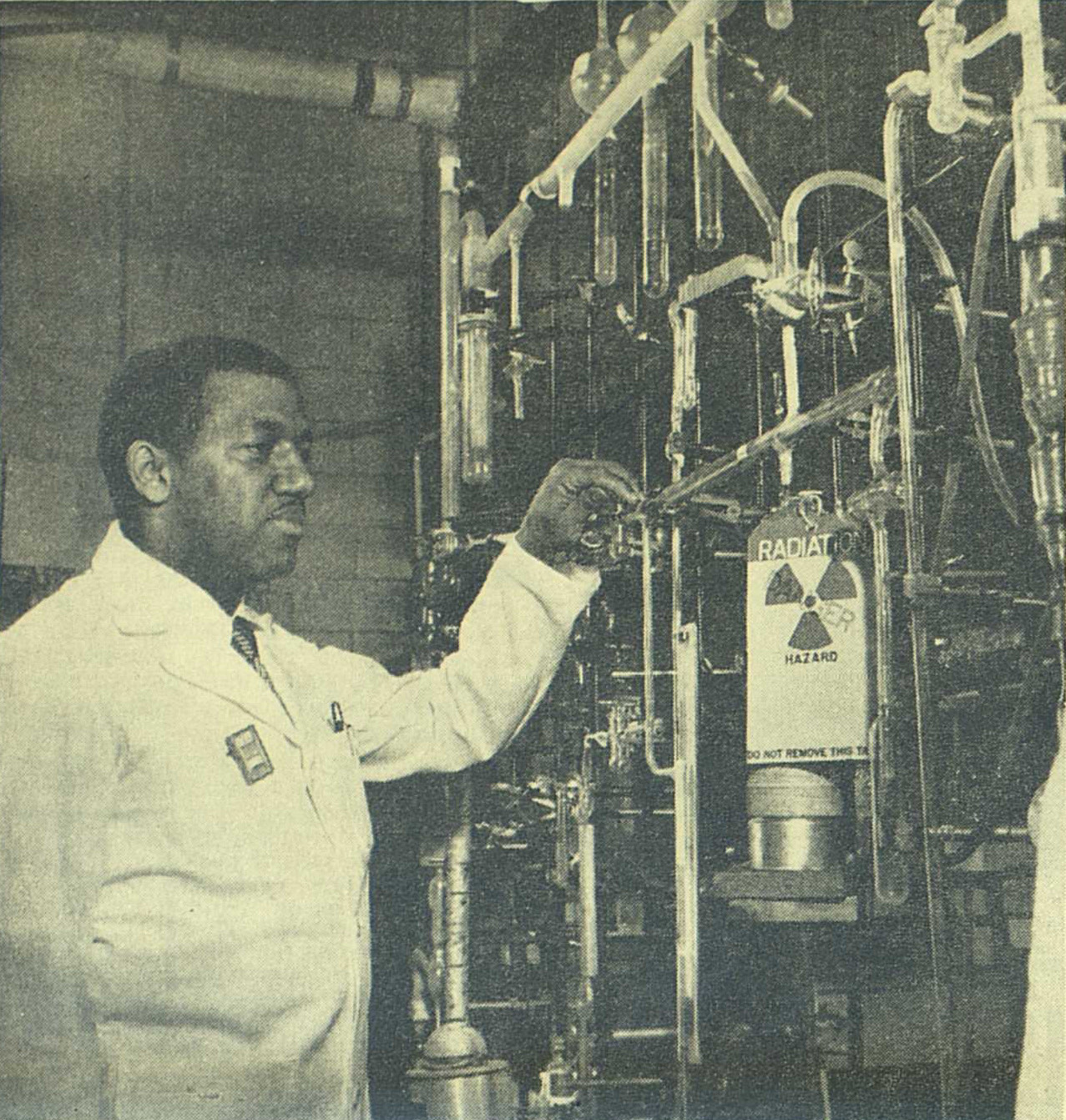
Phillip A. Sellars

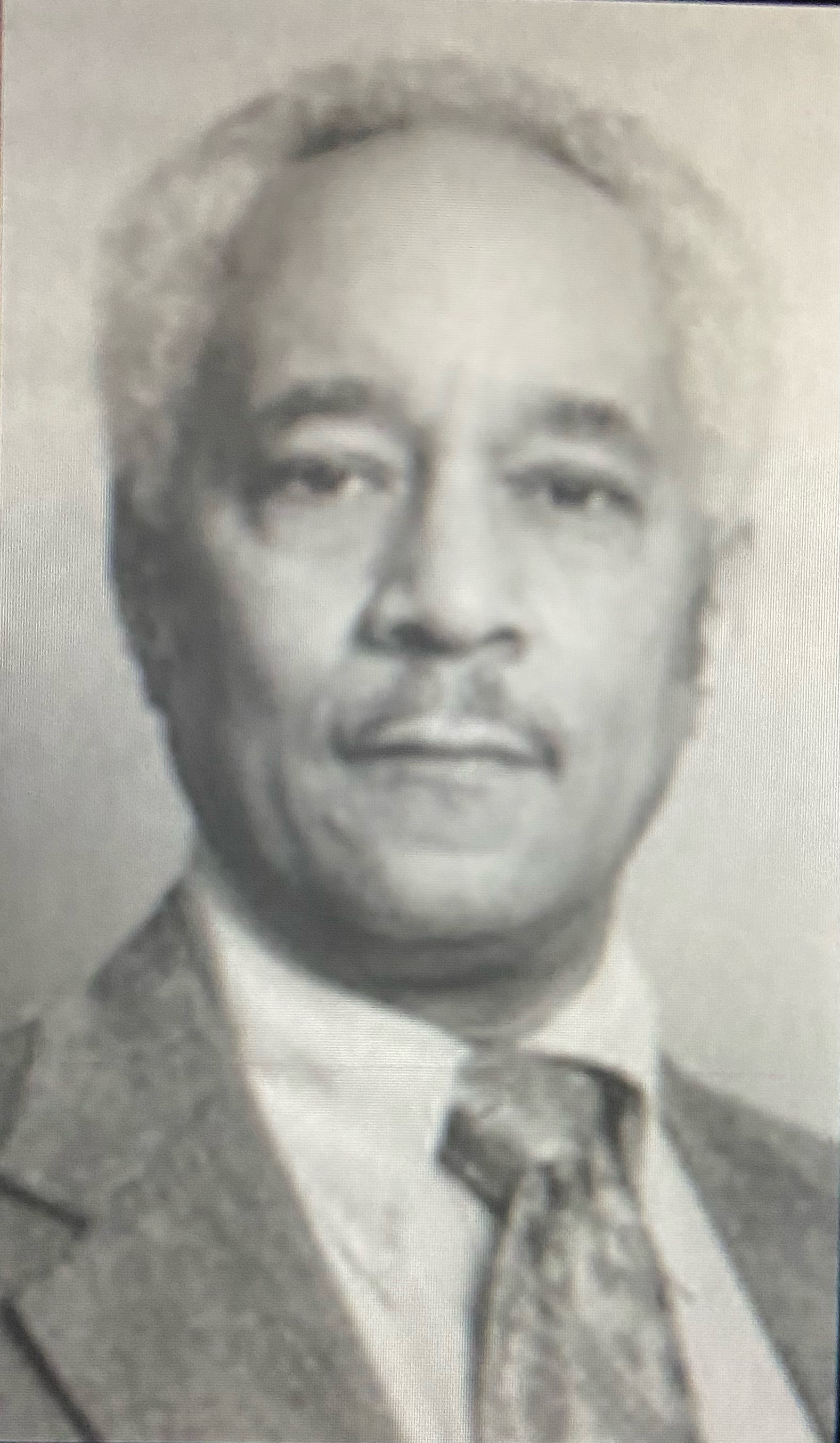
Ralph Gardner-Chavis

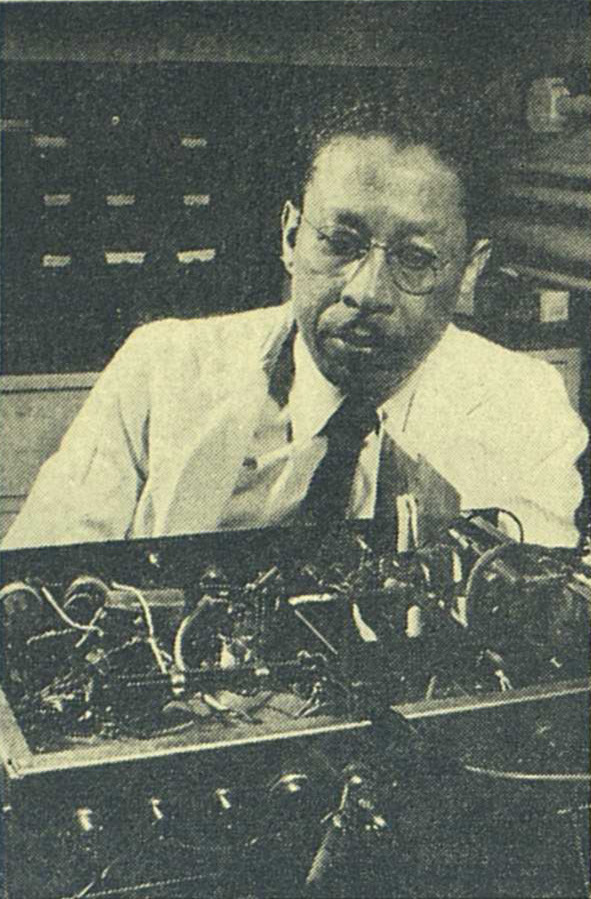
Robert B. Pairs

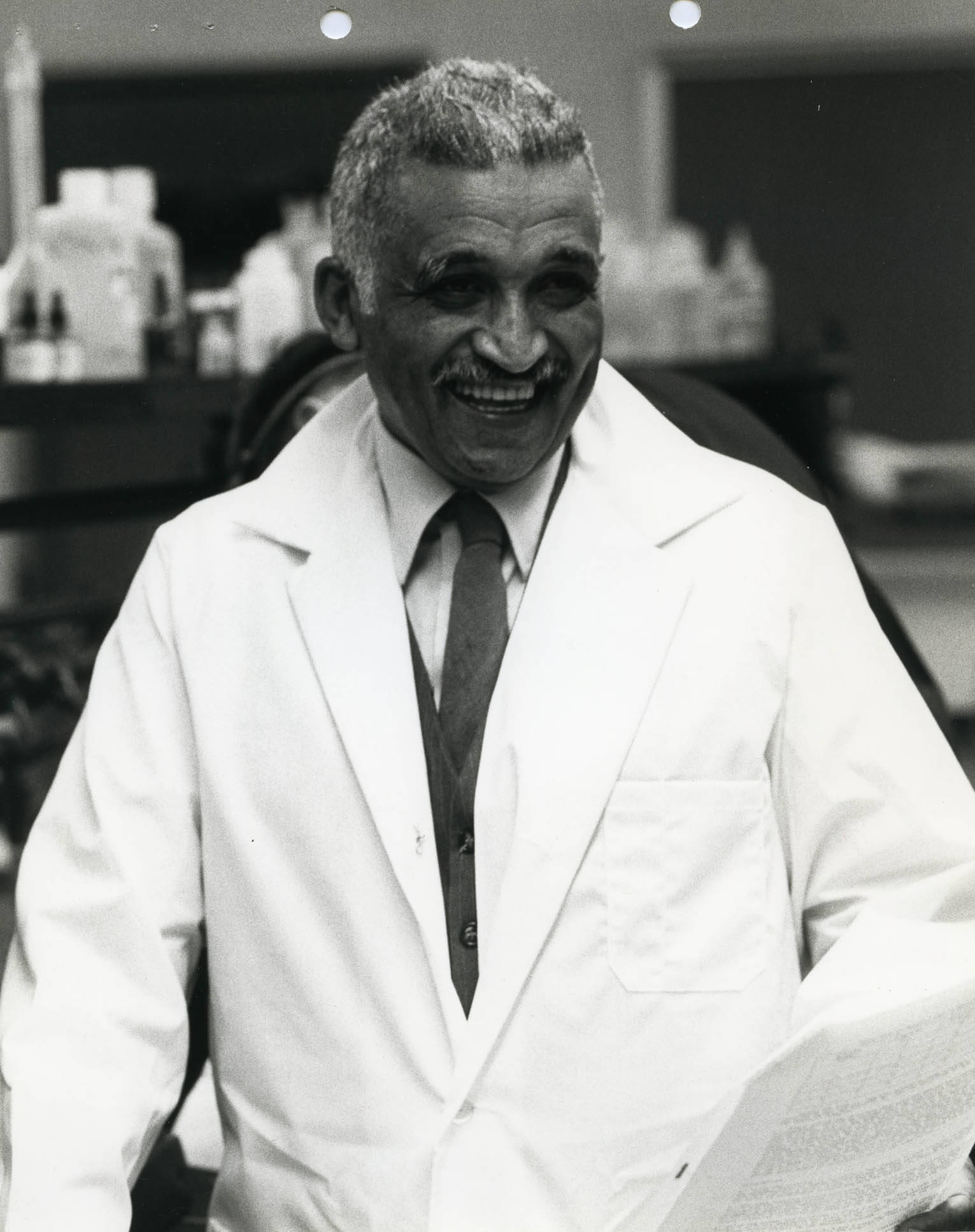
Samuel P. Massie

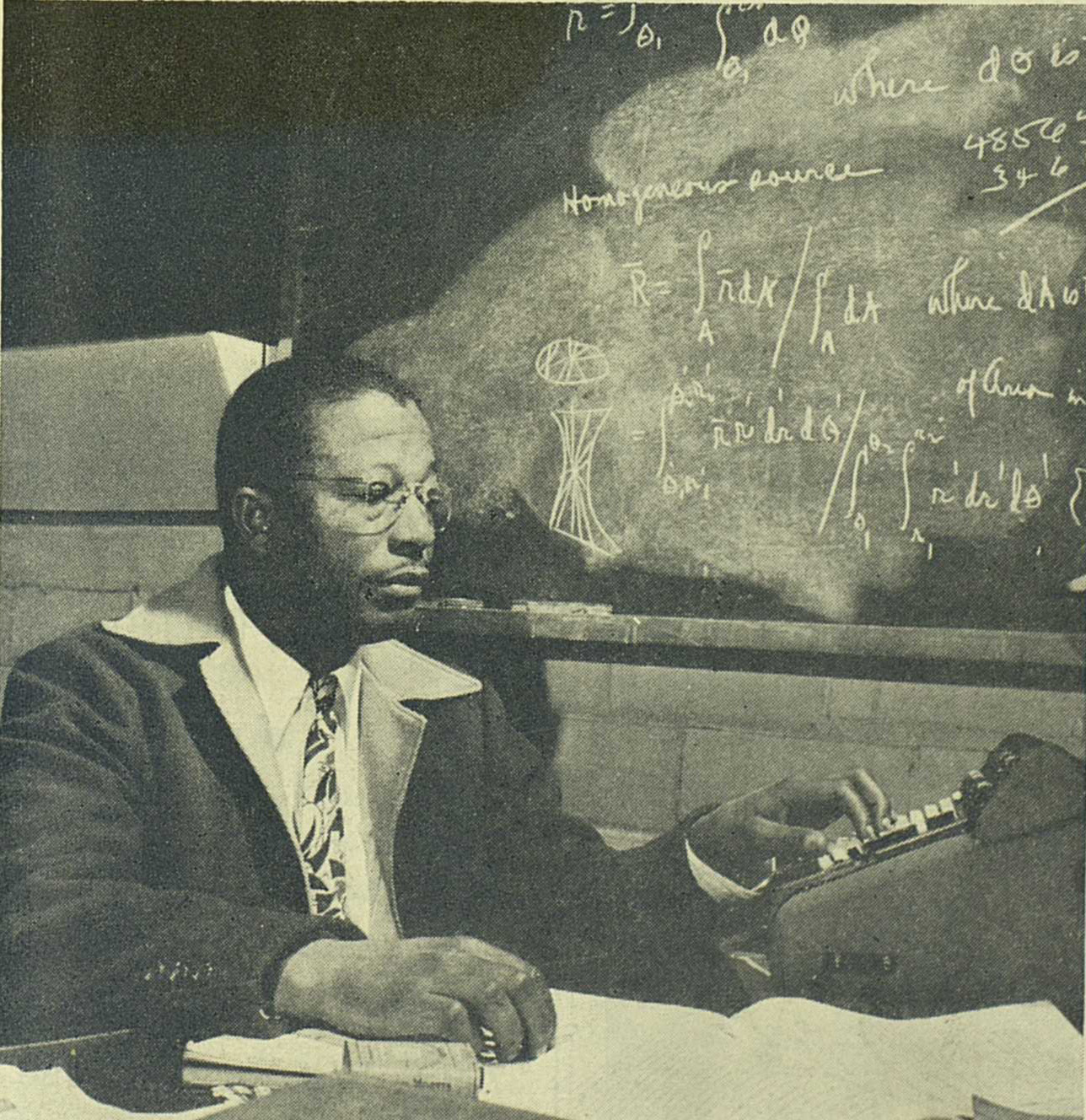
Sylvanus A. Tyler

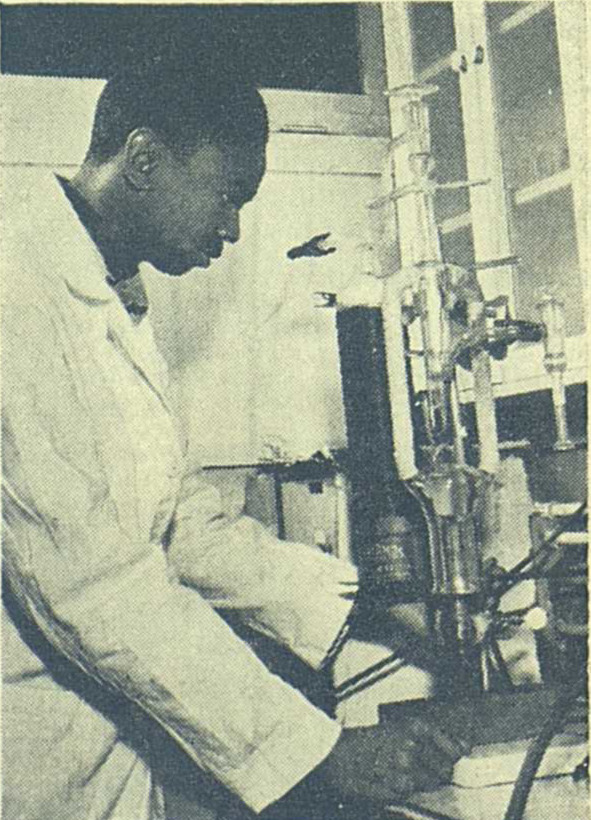
Virgil Trice

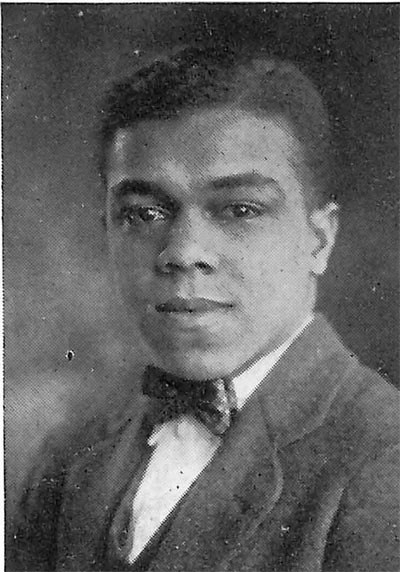
William Jacob Knox Jr.

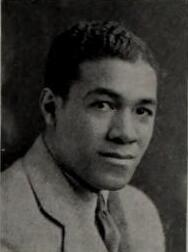
Lawrence H. Knox

== Race and education ==
The background and education of the scientists and technicians who worked on the Manhattan Project was strongly influenced by where they lived. As of 1910, over 90% of the African-American population lived in the Southern United States. Between 1916 and 1940, many African Americans moved from rural areas to cities, and from the southern to the north and western United States, in search of better economic and social conditions. This Great Migration was followed, beginning in 1940, by a Second Great Migration in which many African American urban laborers moved northward to take up skilled jobs, often in the defense industry.

Educational opportunities were limited, particularly in the south. In 1933, in the southern United States, just 54% of white students and only 18% of black students went on to attend high school. Segregated black high schools and colleges in the south had limited resources and were able to offer few opportunities for scientific training. Northern high schools and universities offered more opportunities to study science, though they too were affected by racism.

The educational paths open to African Americans can be illustrated by looking at specific examples of scientists who worked on the Manhattan Project. Moddie Daniel Taylor was born in Nymph, Alabama, later moving to St. Louis, Missouri. He studied and taught at Lincoln University, a public historically black land-grant university in Jefferson City, Missouri. He received his Ph.D. from the University of Chicago in 1943, and was employed by the Metallurgical Laboratory at the University of Chicago as part of the Manhattan Project. Jasper Brown Jeffries was born in Mocksville, North Carolina, near Winston-Salem, North Carolina. He attended an historically black college, West Virginia State College, where he was taught by Angie Turner King. He attended the University of Illinois during 1933–1935, before going to the University of Chicago, where he completed his M.S. degree in physical sciences in 1940.

Lloyd Quarterman was born in Philadelphia, Pennsylvania on May 31, 1918. He attended college and played football at St. Augustine’s College, a black college in Raleigh, North Carolina. He received a bachelor’s degree in 1943, and joined the Manhattan Project as a junior chemist. Another Philadelphian, Harold Delaney, received his bachelor's and master's degrees from traditionally black Howard University before joining the project.

William Jacob Knox Jr. and his younger brother Lawrence H. Knox, were born in New Bedford, Massachusetts. Both earned Ph.D.’s prior to World War II. In spite of being refused lodging in the dormitories with the white students upon his arrival at Harvard University, William earned his bachelor's degree from Harvard. He then attended Massachusetts Institute of Technology for his Master's and Ph.D. degrees, receiving his Ph.D. in 1935. His brother Lawrence completed degrees at Bates College and Stanford University before going to Harvard University and receiving his Ph.D. in 1940. Child prodigy J. Ernest Wilkins Jr. came from a prominent black family in Chicago. He entered the University of Chicago at age 13. When he received his Ph.D. in mathematics from the University in 1942 he was only 19. Wilkins taught at the Tuskegee Institute in Alabama from 1942 to 1944, and joined the Manhattan Project in 1944.

== Working and living conditions ==
Pressure from African American A. Philip Randolph and other labor unionists led to the signing of Executive Order 8802 by President Franklin D. Roosevelt in 1941. The preamble read:

"It is the policy of the United States to encourage full participation in the national defense program by all citizens of the United States, regardless of race, creed, color, or national origin, in the firm belief that the democratic way of life within the Nation can be defended successfully only with the help and support of all groups within its borders."

The order further stated, “There shall be no discrimination in the employment of workers in defense industries of Government because of race, creed, color, or national origin”. Clauses prohibiting discrimination were applied to training programs, defense contracts, and subcontractors.

Work on federal projects such as the Manhattan Project therefore offered opportunities for advancement for African Americans. However, those involved still experienced various forms of racism. Depending in part on location, workers were affected by segregation and inequities in pay and housing.

=== Los Alamos, New Mexico ===
A study assessing the involvement of African Americans at Los Alamos and Oak Ridge between 1942 and 1958 was prepared for the Manhattan Project National Historical Park as of September 2019. No evidence was found of African Americans working as scientists or technicians at Los Alamos prior to 1947. The first African American to work at Los Alamos was Clayborne Carson Sr., the father of Clayborne Carson Jr., who was hired as a laboratory security inspector by the United States Atomic Energy Commission.

=== Oak Ridge, Tennessee ===
The Clinton Engineer Works at Oak Ridge, Tennessee, was created for the Manhattan Project. Chosen in 1942, the area was made a military district outside of state control through a presidential proclamation of July 1943. Most but not all African Americans were laborers.

White and African American workers lived in separate areas, separated initially by a fence topped with barbed wire. Lower level laborers lived in cramped gender-segregated "hutments". The women's area was referred to as the "Pen". Higher paid white workers had the option of living in houses, in their own neighborhood, and white couples could live together. A neighborhood for higher paid black employees was planned but never provided. They were forced to live in the segregated "hutments", where couples were separated. Restrooms, water fountains, dining facilities and recreational activities were racially divided.

Living conditions for African Americans at Oak Ridge worsened over time as the buildings deteriorated. In 1945, ten years before Oak Ridge would start to desegregate, Enoch P. Waters wrote in the Chicago Tribune:

"If through the work done here America has advanced science, it is equally true that in the way it has forced Negroes to live here America has retarded the cause of democracy,... And this is ironical because it was to preserve democracy that this whole project was brought into being."

=== Hanford, Washington ===
The Hanford Engineer Works was also created in response to World War II. It displaced the population of Hanford, Washington, and disrupted local farming communities. The DuPont Company managed the site and actively recruited African American workers in accordance with departmental guidelines. However, they intentionally limited the number of African Americans they employed to around 10–20% of the workforce, just enough to satisfy regulations.

Housing was both segregated and limited. The only one of the nearby Tri-Cities which would accept African Americans as residents was Pasco, Washington. The company provided only two buildings for African American workers: others lived in substandard conditions in tents, shacks or trailers. The NAACP estimated that 80% of Hanford's businesses chose to segregate and refused to serve African American customers.

=== Columbia University, New York City ===
The SAM Laboratories at Columbia University in New York City employed African American scientists and technicians on the Manhattan Project. Some, like James Forde, held low-level positions within the lab. In contrast, William Jacob Knox Jr. was a research associate who developed gaseous diffusion techniques to use corrosive uranium hexafluoride gas in the separation of uranium isotopes. His work was essential to the project. Willard Libby appointed William Knox to be the supervisor of the otherwise all-white Corrosion Section of the nuclear research team at Columbia, the highest position held by any African American in the Manhattan Project. The rest of the staff in the section were white. (William's brother Lawrence H. Knox, a biochemist, came to Columbia in 1944 and did research on quinine and the effects of nuclear bombs.)

=== Chicago Metallurgical Laboratory, Chicago, Illinois ===
The Chicago Metallurgical Laboratory, at the University of Chicago, in Chicago, Illinois, was the site most likely to employ African American scientists in high-status positions. The University of Chicago admitted African American students from its founding in 1890, and Arthur Compton, the director of the Met Lab, supported the hiring of a diverse workforce.

A number of the African Americans at Met Lab were University of Chicago graduates, including Jesse Ernest Wilkins (Ph.D. 1942), Moddie Daniel Taylor (Ph.D. 1943), and Jasper Brown Jeffries (Masters, 1940). Edwin Roberts Russell was a Ph.D. student when he joined the Manhattan Project. He would later receive a patent for the method of separating Plutonium-239 from Uranium and ionic exchange absorption for Plutonium separation. Following the war, several men completed further degrees: George Warren Reed Jr. (Ph.D. University of Chicago, 1952), Harold Delaney (Ph.D. Howard University, 1958) Ralph Gardner-Chavis (Ph.D. Case Western Reserve, 1959) and Benjamin Franklin Scott (Masters, University of Chicago, 1950).

Mathematician and engineer Jesse Ernest Wilkins and Ralph Gardner-Chavis initially worked with Enrico Fermi on the study of plutonium. European-born refugee scientists like Fermi were generally more open to working with African Americans. In 1944, Wilkins was part of Eugene Wigner's project team at the Met Lab. Wigner and Wilkins worked on neutron absorption. Wilkins' discoveries include the Wilkins Effect, the Wilkins Spectra, and the Wigner-Wilkins approach for calculating thermal neutron spectra and estimating the distribution of nuclear energy in reactors.

When Wigner's team was slated to move from the Chicago Met Lab to Oak Ridge, it was considered impossible for Wilkins to go with them and hold a post comparable to his existing scientific position. (Some accounts say Wilkins would not consider a position under such conditions.) Edward Teller saw the opportunity to recruit Wilkins to New York, and recommended him to the director of war research, Harold Urey. Wilkins remained at the Met Lab.

"Knowing that men of high qualifications are scarce these days, I thought that it might be useful that I suggest a capable person for this job. Mr. Wilkins in Wigner's group at the Metallurgical Laboratory has been doing, according to Wigner, excellent work." Edward Teller to Harold Urey.

Jeffries and Wilkins later signed the Szilárd petition, appealing to President Truman to warn Japan or demonstrate the atomic bomb before using it against Japan. After the war, Wilkins worked for the American Optical Company in Buffalo, New York as a mathematician. In the 1950s, he managed the Research and Development Division of the United Nuclear Corporation, and researched peaceful uses of nuclear energy.

George Warren Reed Jr. earned a master's degree as an organic chemist at Howard University in 1944. He worked at the Met Lab on the purification of uranium. He tried to convince the draft board to grant him recognition and benefits under the G.I. Bill, comparable to white researchers he worked with, but was unsuccessful. After the war Reed continued to work with the University of Chicago and the Metallurgical Laboratory's successor, the Argonne National Laboratory. He later studied meteorites and lunar samples from the Apollo missions.

== Major contributions ==
The work involved in the Manhattan Project was kept deeply secret. However, a number of African-American scientists are known to have made significant scientific contributions in a variety of areas. African-Americans contributed to the theoretical understanding of nuclear physics and the extraction and processing of the fissionable uranium isotope, Uranium-235, which was used in Little Boy. An African-American physicist worked with polonium, which was used as an initiator for the Fat Man bomb. Others developed instruments for the detection of elements and radiation.

William Jacob Knox Jr., a physical chemist, joined Columbia in 1943 and was promoted to the head of the Corrosion section of the nuclear research team. Knox held an unprecedented position at Columbia University, serving as the only African-American supervisor on the Manhattan Project. Knox's group developed gaseous diffusion techniques for the isolation of uranium isotopes. He and his team developed a method in which uranium was vaporized and combined with fluorine to form the gas uranium hexafluoride. The gas was then pumped through a microscopic barrier that separated lighter U-235 based molecules from slightly heavier U-238. The complex process of breaking apart uranium isotopes utilizing uranium hexafluoride was crucial to the development of the atomic bombs. Following the war, Knox joined Eastman Kodak Company where he became highly respected for his expertise with surfactants, photographic emulsions and the coating of photographs.

Chemist Lloyd Albert Quarterman worked at Chicago's Met Lab from 1943 to 1949. Quarterman worked with fluorine, one of the most reactive and dangerous elements. He was chiefly responsible for the design and construction of a distillation system that used electrolysis to purify large quantities of hydrogen fluoride (also extremely dangerous), which was used to isolate the isotope U-235 from uranium. He later helped to design the atomic reactor for the first nuclear powered submarine.

Carolyn Parker, physicist, worked from 1943 to 1947 on the Dayton Project at Wright-Patterson Air Force Base in Dayton, Ohio. The Monsanto Chemical Company led top-secret research work on the use of polonium and beryllium for the "Urchin" initiator used in the implosion design for Fat Man. Parker is believed to have worked with polonium on the development of Urchin: she died of leukemia at age 48.

Jesse Ernest Wilkins Jr. worked on the Manhattan Project at the University of Chicago beginning in 1944, As a physicist and mathematician, he worked immediately under Eugene Wigner, director of the Theoretical Physics group. The group's theoretical work provided the basis for the Hanford, Washington fission reactor. Wilkins was instrumental in resolving several issues related to reactor design and quantifying what are now known as "the Wilkins effect, and the Wigner-Wilkins and Wilkins spectra for thermal neutrons." The Wigner-Wilkins approach was used to calculate thermal neutron spectra and estimate the distribution of nuclear energy in reactors. Wilkins went on to lead "one of the most exemplary careers of scholarship and application of an American mathematician/physicist/engineer in the 20th century."

Physicist Robert Johnson Omohundro used mass spectrometry to identify the elements in samples of materials. During World War II he was based in Arizona. He developed instruments to detect and measure radioactive materials and radiation emissions. Following the war, he worked at the Naval Research Laboratory, where he continued to develop and patent instruments for radiation detection. His technology was used by the International Atomic Energy Agency, in airports to detect fissionable material, and in portable neutron detectors.

== Scientists and technicians by location ==
Name	Date of birth	Date of death	Gender	Work location	Position	Sources
Carter, George Sherman	1911	1998	male	Columbia University	scientist	
Knox, Lawrence H.	1906	1966	male	Columbia University	scientist	
Knox Jr., William Jacob	1904	1995	male	Columbia University	scientist	
Massie, Samuel P.	1919	2005	male	Ames Laboratory, Iowa State University,	scientist	
Omohundro, Robert Johnson	1921	2000	male	Arizona-based	technician	
Parker, Carolyn Beatrice	1917	1966	female	Dayton Project	scientist	
Boykin, Pearline (or Perline)	c. 1911		female	Met Lab	technician	
Delaney, Harold	1919	1994	male	Met Lab	scientist	
Evans Jr., Harold B.	1907	1995	male	Met Lab	scientist	
Gardner-Chavis, Ralph	1922	2018	male	Met Lab	scientist	
Jeffries, Jasper Brown	1912	1994	male	Met Lab	scientist	
Lawrence, Blanche J.	1921		female	Met Lab	technician	
Quarterman, Lloyd	1918	1982	male	Met Lab	scientist	
Reed, George Warren	1920	2015	male	Met Lab	scientist	
Russell, Edwin Roberts	1913	1996	male	Met Lab	scientist	
Scott, Benjamin Franklin	1922	2000	male	Met Lab	scientist	
Summers, Mildred M.	1913		female	Met Lab, Hanford and Argonne Labs		
Taylor, Moddie Daniel	1912	1976	male	Met Lab	scientist	
Wilkins Jr., Jesse Ernest	1923	2011	male	Met Lab	scientist	
Forde, James	1927		male	Columbia University	technician	
Hall, Cynthia			female	Argonne Lab		
Tyree, Ella B.			female	Argonne Lab		
Wallace, Herschel			male	Argonne Lab		
Sellars, Phillip A.			male	Argonne Lab		
Pairs, Robert B.			male	Argonne Lab		
Tyler, Sylvanus			male	Argonne Lab		
Trice Jr., Virgil Garnett	1926	1997	male	Argonne Lab		

== Legacy ==
The legacy of the Manhattan Project is complex and emotionally difficult. Uranium-235 was used to create the Little Boy atomic bomb, which was dropped on the city of Hiroshima. Plutonium and polonium were used in the Fat Man bomb, which was detonated over Nagasaki. While most of those working on the Manhattan Project had no idea that their work would lead to the devastating destruction of two cities full of people, they knew that their work supported the war effort.

At least two African American scientists, Jasper Brown Jeffries and Jesse Ernest Wilkins Jr., were among the tiny group of people aware by July 1945 of the proposal to bomb Japan. Both of them signed the Szilárd petition in an attempt to prevent such use. Others were unaware of what their work was contributing to. James Forde, a 17-year-old laboratory assistant who cleaned beakers and tubes in a sulfuric acid bath, recalls his moment of realization: 'I saw the headline where we had dropped the bomb. I said, “Oh my God. That is what I was working on.”'

African-Americans, like other Americans, were divided in their response to the Manhattan Project. Use of the atomic bomb was viewed variously as a horrific act, as a necessary act to end the war, and as a patriotic accomplishment. Some African-Americans saw inclusion in the scientific community of the Manhattan Project as evidence that African Americans had earned and shown themselves worthy of civil rights. Optimists applauded the participation of African Americans scientists in the Manhattan project as indicating a scientific "enlightenment" in which racism could be overcome by scientific rationalism. African-American scientists and technicians who worked on the Manhattan Project have been described as "ideal symbols of enlightenment within the struggle for African-American political rights".

At the same time W. E. B. Du Bois, Langston Hughes, Walter Francis White and other African Americans critiqued the bomb and its implications in black newspapers. Roy Wilkins wrote an editorial in the September 1945 issue of The Crisis connecting use of atomic weapons and racist portrayals of the Japanese as subhuman, asking "Who is barbarian and who is civilized?" He and others questioned whether the Allies were fighting a "racial war" when they used the bomb against the Japanese but not against Europeans. Langston Hughes summed up the concern in an August 18, 1945 Chicago Defender column, concluding through the voice of "Simple" that "Japs is colored."

Over the longer term, African American leaders including Malcolm X, Bayard Rustin, Coretta Scott King, Martin Luther King Jr., and members of the Black Panther Party protested the use of nuclear weapons and nuclear testing. King's spiritual and moral analysis of society explored and called out the connections between racial injustice, poverty, and war. Those who viewed the atomic bomb in the context of anti-colonialism, internationalism, and the development of world community tended to be more critical of it than those who focused on national opportunities for civil rights and citizenship.

As a Ph.D. student, Samuel P. Massie was faced with the choice of being drafted to the front lines, or working on the Manhattan Project. He did not talk about his involvement in the Manhattan Project later beyond saying “All of us had to make a decision how we would serve the war efforts. I dropped out of school and went into the chemical warfare service with Dr. Gilman at Ames.” After the war, Massie built an exceptional career as an organic chemist, researching anti-bacterial agents and the treatment of malaria, herpes, and meningitis. His granddaughter, Victoria Massie, has written about the difficulty she experiences in reconciling these sides of her grandfather's life, when he is gone and cannot answer her questions.
