= George Warren Reed Jr. =

American chemist (1920 – 2015)

George Warren Reed Jr. (1920–2015) was an African American physicist known for his contributions to nuclear physics and his active involvement in civil rights activism.

== Early life and education ==
George Warren Reed, Jr. was born in Washington, D.C. on September 25, 1920. His mother graduated from Miner Teachers College and worked hard to provide for him. In early childhood, he was not allowed to work, even though the family had slight difficulties. His only focus was to attend school and come home to complete all his assignments. Reed demonstrated exceptional academic aptitude and a strong interest in physics from an early age.

Reed attended Howard University, where he received a Bachelor of Science in chemistry in 1942 and a Master of Science in 1944. He then obtained his Doctor of Philosophy from the University of Chicago in 1952.

== Career ==
Reed became a nuclear and geo-chemist and worked on the Manhattan Project during World War II, where he helped advance nuclear physics and atomic weapons. Reed's main purpose was to make fissionable uranium to produce and sustain a nuclear reaction; he also examined the radiation of two chemicals, uranium and plutonium, in different stages at the chemistry division of the Argonne National Laboratory. Reed’s work had a huge influence on the construction of the atomic bomb. He studied, and research fission yields related to uranium and thorium to a definitive nuclear chain reaction.

At the University of Chicago's Metallurgical Laboratory, he worked alongside twelve famous Black Americans who made an impact to the projects mission. He worked with individuals such as Ralph Gardner-Chavis, Jasper Jeffries, Lawrence and William Jacob Knox, Blanche J. Lawrence, Carolyn Parker, Ella Tyree, and J. Ernest Wilkins. In light of Reed accomplishments, he was faced with racism with all his peers. At first, numerous black scientists who worked on Oak Ridge's atomic bomb were not recognized for their knowledge and expertise. In the 1940s due to Jim Crow segregation laws only the white Americans and European refugee scientists could work freely on the site, black researchers could not. Therefore a "Solid South" bloc of Democrats in Congress insisted that the new city reflected the Jim Crow segregation where African American could work. A "secret city" was built in the rural farmland of Anderson County, and African- American chemists and scientists were transferred to live there. Reed's contributions to the Manhattan Project in Oak Ridge by black scientists was not heard of. Reed and J. Ernest Wilkins worked with European refugee scientists Enrico Fermi and Leo Szilard in the Chicago Metallurgical Laboratory, known as the "Met Lab". Their research was moved to the south without receiving credit for their work. Since Reed and J. Ernest Wilkin's knowledge and expertise had a crucial role in the Manhattan Project in today's society they are now credited. Reed and his fellow peers were acknowledged the by National Nuclear Security Administration (NNSA) because it was the start of nuclear security missions, and it is a use in today's society.

In 2006, Reed's son, Mark Morrison-Reed, interviewed Reed about his experiences with the Manhattan Project. Morrison-Reed donated the interview to the Atomic Heritage Foundation. In the interview, Reed stated,

My life story would be very different had not World War II intervened with the need to more fully utilize all the nation’s manpower and with the continued opening up of opportunities to all. [...] We didn’t know it at the time, but we were developing the atomic bomb. [...] I was trained as an organic chemist and we were purifying uranium, but at that time I was totally in the dark; we didn’t even talk to the people in the lab next to us.

After the war, Reed made significant contributions to the development of nuclear energy and its applications, including publishing over 120 scientific papers. From 1952 to 1968, Reed worked at the Argonne National Laboratory in the chemistry division as an associate chemist. He was then promoted to a senior scientist beginning in 1968. At the laboratory Reed did scientific research subsidiary of the university.

Reed worked with the Meteoritical Society from 1970 to 1972 and National Aeronautics and Space Administration (NASA) from 1972 to 1980. While at NASA, he analyzed a sample of the moon rock from the first moon landing. His conclusion were the rock was contained with minerals not found on earth, a conclusion he made using a nuclear reactor.

Along with his scientific endeavors, Reed was an active civil rights activist, advocating for African Americans' equality and justice.

== Personal life ==
Reed married Selina Edwards, with whom he had four children: Mark, Philip, Carole, and Lauren.

Reed had been brought up in the Christian Science faith and was an attendee of the predominantly African American Eighth Church of Christ, Scientist.

Reed died in Chicago on August 31, 2015, from natural causes.

== See also ==
- African-American scientists and technicians on the Manhattan Project
