= Clinton E. Knox =

American diplomat (1908–1980)

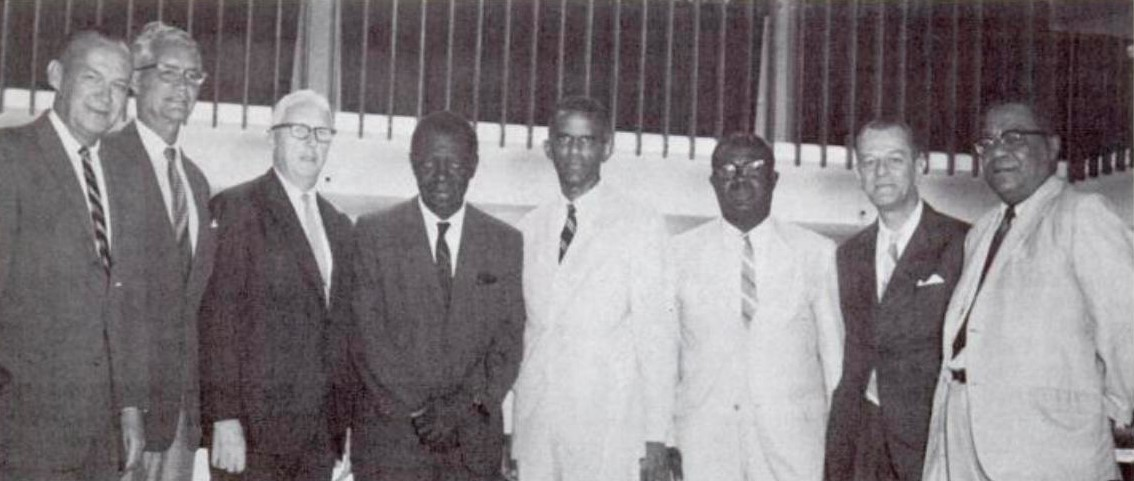
Knox (far right) with other diplomats in 1967

Clinton Everett Knox (May 5, 1908 – October 14, 1980) was an American diplomat who was the U.S. ambassador to Haiti. He was held hostage in his residence in Port-au-Prince for almost 20 hours on January 24, 1973. Knox and Consul General Ward L. Christensen were released in exchange for the release of 12 Haitian prisoners, safe conduct to Mexico and a ransom of $70,000.

Knox was also the ambassador to Dahomey (now Benin) from 1964 to 1969. He was the first African American secretary to the United States Mission to the North Atlantic Treaty Organization (NATO).

== Biography ==
Knox was born in New Bedford, Massachusetts, on May 5, 1908 to William Jacob Knox Sr., a US postal worker, and Estella Briggs. Knox was one of 5 siblings and the youngest. Knox and his older brothers, Lawrence H. Knox and William Jacob Knox Jr., all went on to attend Harvard University and earn doctoral degrees in their respective fields of study.

He started his career at the State Department in 1945. He graduated from New Bedford High School in 1926. Knox graduated from Williams College (A.B., 1930) and earned an M.A. from Brown University in 1931. Knox was as an instructor at Morgan State College, teaching history and international relations between 1931 and 1936 and again between 1939 and 1943. While not at Morgan State, he was studying European History at Harvard University (Ph.D., 1940). Knox was the Bayard-Cutting Fellow at Harvard University (1938–1939).

Knox died in Silver Springs, Maryland, on October 14, 1980, at the age of 72.
