= Edwin Russell =

Edwin Russell may refer to:

- Edwin F. Russell (1914–2001), American newspaper publisher
- Edwin Russell (artist) (1939–2013), British sculptor
- Edwin R. Russell (1913–1996), African American chemist

== See also ==
- E. R. Jackman (Edwin Russell Jackman, 1894–1967), American agricultural expert
