= Moddie Taylor =

- Born: Moddie Daniel Taylor; March 3, 1912; Nymph, Alabama
- Died: September 15, 1976 (aged 64); Washington, DC
- Education: Lincoln University (BS); University of Chicago (MS, PhD)
- Occupation: Chemist
- Employers: University of Chicago's Metallurgical Laboratory, 1943–1945; Lincoln University, 1946–1948; Howard University, 1948–1976
- Known for: Contributions to the Manhattan Project
- Spouse: Vivian Ellis
- Children: Herbert Moddie Taylor
- Awards: Certificate of Merit Medal

Moddie Daniel Taylor (March 3, 1912 – September 15, 1976) was an African American chemist who specialized in rare earth minerals. He was one of the African American scientists and technicians on the Manhattan Project from 1943 to 1945, working to develop the atomic bomb. For his work on the Manhattan Project, he was awarded a Certificate of Merit Medal for his contributions by Secretary of War Robert P. Patterson.

== Early life and education ==
Taylor was born in Nymph, Alabama in 1912, growing up in the segregated South. His mother was Celeste (Oliver) Taylor and father was Herbert L. Taylor. His family subsequently moved to St. Louis where his father worked as a postal clerk. Taylor earned a B.S. in chemistry from Lincoln University in Jefferson City, Missouri in 1935, graduating as valedictorian. He remained at Lincoln University, teaching chemistry before deciding to pursue his graduate studies at the University of Chicago. There, he received an M.S. in 1939 and a PhD in 1943 specializing in rare earth minerals. His graduate thesis was entitled Acid-Base Studies in Gaseous Systems; The Dissociation of the Addition Compounds of Trimethylboron with Aliphatic Amines.

== Research and career ==
From 1943 to 1945, Taylor began working on the Manhattan Project as a research associate in the Metallurgical Laboratory. The researchers at the Metallurgical Laboratory worked on developing the casing for the atomic bomb. Following the war, he returned to his alma mater at Lincoln University School of Law continuing to teach chemistry before moving to Howard University in 1948 to become an associate professor of chemistry. He was promoted to full professor in 1959 before leading the university's chemistry department from 1969 to 1976. He retired on April 1, 1976, as a professor emeritus.

At Howard, Taylor's research interests centered on the vapor phase dissociation of some carboxylic acids. In 1952, he was inducted into the Washington Academy of Sciences in recognition for this work and in 1956, he was awarded a research grant from the American Academy of Arts and Sciences to continue this line of work. He was recognized for his excellence in teaching by numerous scientific organizations and societies, including the Manufacturing Chemists' Association and the Washington Institute of Chemists. In 1960, he wrote the chemistry textbook First Principles of Chemistry, which became popularly used in colleges across the United States.

== Awards and honors ==
- Certificate of Merit Medal, 1946
- Inducted Member, Washington Academy of Sciences, 1952
- Top College Chemistry Professor, Manufacturing Chemists' Association, 1960
- Honor Scroll, Washington Institute of Chemists, 1972
- Fellow, American Institute of Chemists

== Personal life ==
Taylor married Vivian Ellis in 1937 and they had a son named Herbert Moddie Taylor. Taylor died on May 30, 1976, in Washington, DC.
