= George Sherman Carter =

African-American physicist, chemist

George Sherman Carter (1911–1998) was an African American physicist known for being one of the few African-American scientists working on the Manhattan Project at Columbia University. He was a member of The American Association of Scientific Workers, an organization founded in the 1930s that consisted of scientists and engineers who were interested in the social and ethical implications of science and technology.

== Early life and education ==
George Sherman Carter was born on May 10, 1911, in Gloucester County, Virginia. He is among four boys and one girl, and he was born to George Peter and Emily Maude Carter. In 1940, he earned his Bachelor of Science in Biology from Lincoln University. While at the university, he actively participated in various extracurriculars, including joining the Alpha Phi Alpha fraternity, contributing to the track team, and participating in the New York Club and the Wissenschaft Verein (Science Club). From there, he began studying at Columbia University Teachers College and later on the City of New York College.

== Career ==
Carter later wed Kathleen Francis, and together they had a daughter named Beverly Kathleen. In 1943, George Sherman Carter was employed by Columbia University in New York to collaborate with the University of Chicago on research into nuclear fission. This initiative, orchestrated by the Army Corps of Engineers, was a part of the renowned Manhattan Project that led to the development of the first atomic bomb. The Manhattan Project was a secret World War II effort by the U.S., UK, and Canada to develop the first atomic bombs, responding to fears of Nazi Germany's nuclear ambitions. Led by the U.S., it united top scientists and military to produce the bombs, which were later used on Japan, hastening the war's end. He was among the limited number of African Americans scientists involved in the project. While there, Carter was employed under Nobel laureate Isidor Rabi. Following the conclusion of the Manhattan Project, Carter and his family continued to reside in Harlem. He became deeply involved in the community, playing an essential role. Initially, he participated actively in the Abyssinian Baptist Church, but later he transitioned to the Unity Church, both located in Harlem.
