= Harold B. Evans =

African American research chemist of the Manhattan Project

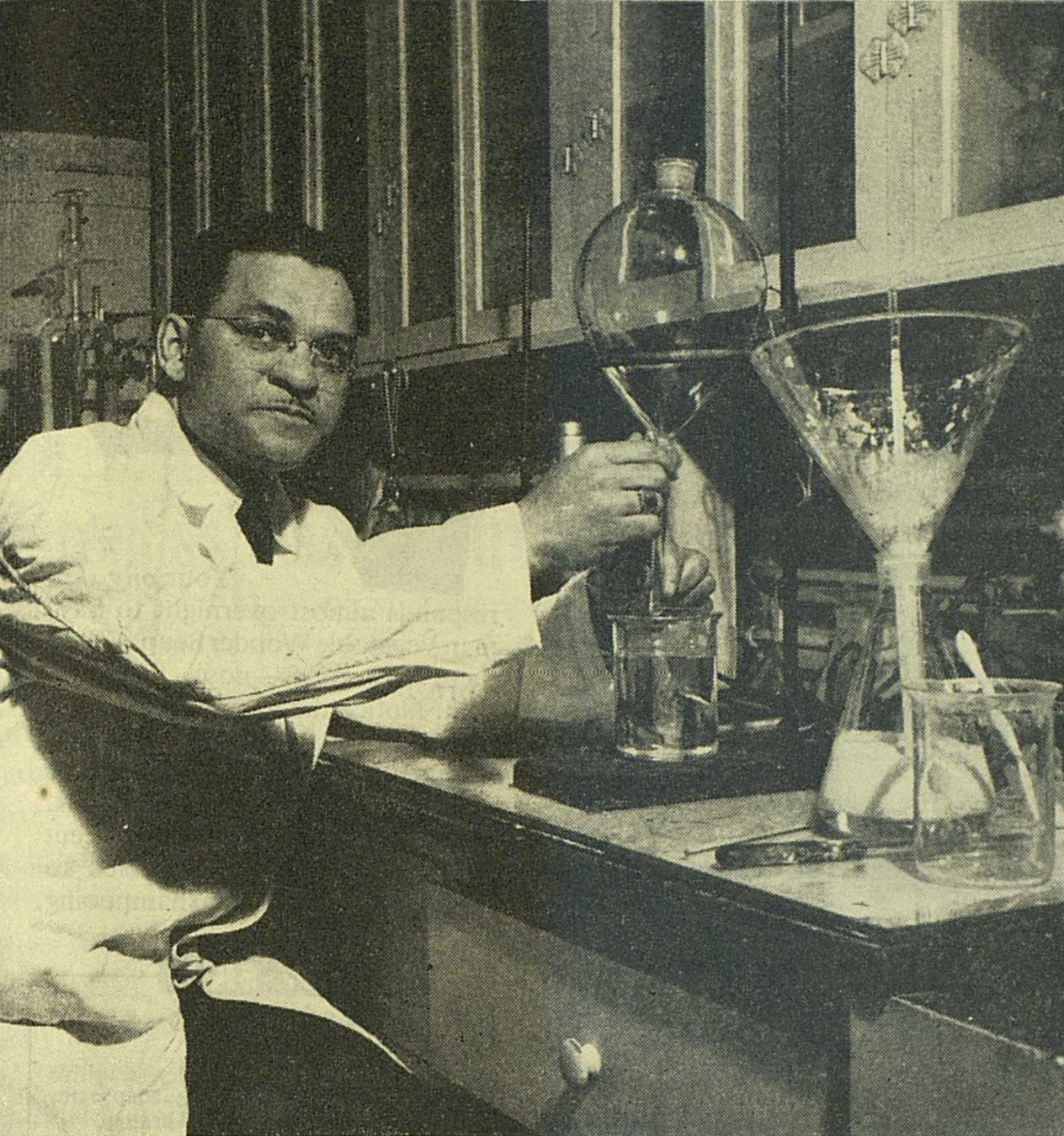
- Born: October 31, 1907; Brazil, Indiana, U.S.
- Died: July 28, 1995 (aged 87)
- Education: Michigan State University
- Known for: Involvement in the Manhattan Project
- Scientific career
- Workplaces: Argonne National Laboratory

Harold B. Evans (October 31, 1907 - July 28, 1995) was an African American research chemist, one of the few African American scientists to work on the Manhattan Project. While working on the Manhattan Project, he researched radioactive elements and chemical reactions. Evans later became a member of the American Chemical Society and the Science Research Society of America.

== Early life and education ==
Harold B. Evans was born on October 31, 1907 in Brazil, Indiana. Evans attended Michigan State University and majored in applied science. He graduated from Michigan State in 1931 with a master's degree. Harold wrote his thesis on a chemical process called Benzylation of Thymol. After, he married and had one child. He was a member of the American Chemical Society and of the Science Research Society of America.

== Career ==
Harold B. Evans was a research chemist. Evans was a teacher at Georgia State College and taught African American students for a year. He was then hired by Kankakee Ordnance Works in 1941. At Kankakee Ordnance Works, Harold helped Great Britain by working on projects that supported them until the United States entered World War II. Evans also helped the United States during the war for two years by working on their military projects. Later, Harold started working at the Met Lab which is now known as Argonne. At Argonne, Evans researched chemical reactions and relations that refers to radioactive elements. Harold also worked on the Manhattan Project as one of the few junior African American chemists.

== Later life ==
Evans retired from Argonne when he and his wife moved to MacClenny, Florida. Harold B. Evans died on July 28, 1995, in MacClenny, Florida.
