= James Forde (administrator) =

American health official and social worker

James A. Forde
- Born: January 23, 1927; Brooklyn, New York, U.S.
- Died: April 18, 2024 (aged 97)
- Other name: Jim
- Education: Brooklyn College
- Occupations: Scientist, social worker, healthcare administrator
- Known for: Manhattan Project

James A. Forde (January 23, 1927 – April 18, 2024), also known as Jim, worked on the Manhattan Project from 1944 to 1945. Forde was hired by the Union Carbide and Carbon Company to clean test tubes as scientists worked to develop the gaseous diffusion process. He was the only African American working in the building at the time.

== Early life and education ==
Forde was born on January 23, 1927 in Brooklyn, New York.

Forde graduated from High School at the age of 15, and attended Brooklyn College.

Forde returned to Brooklyn College after his time as a lab assistant for the Manhattan Project. Forde continued his education and received a master's in public administration in 1955.

== Career ==
In 1944, Forde worked for Union Carbon and Carbide Company, which led him to become a part of the Manhattan Project. Forde started the Manhattan Project at the age of 17 as a lab assistant at the Nash Garage building at Columbia University. This meant he did clean-up work which included cleaning the beakers and other materials, but his most important job was to clean tubes used to test barrier solutions. After the Manhattan Project, Forde was laid off, instead of getting transferred to Los Alamos.

After getting laid off, he continued his studies at Brooklyn College, and received a job at the Columbia Broadcasting System (CBS). He was able to be a part of CBS in the early stages of development.

After graduating college, he went on to become a social worker for New York City. He later finished his master's degree and moved to the Albany/Schenectady area where he worked for the Department of Mental Health and Hygiene. He worked for the state for about 20 years in many different positions. He later became the regional director for mental health facilities.

He moved to San Diego and in 1979 became director of the Department of Health Services for 10 years in the county of San Diego. Forde retired after leaving the San Diego Health Services and went into community work. He organized local and state healthcare for African Americans.
