= Benjamin Franklin Scott =

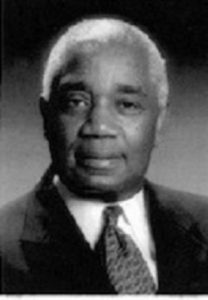
- Born: October 19, 1922; Florence, South Carolina
- Died: October 16, 2000 (aged 77); Sumter, South Carolina
- Known for: Manhattan Project
- Scientific career
- Fields: Chemistry

Benjamin Franklin Scott (1922–2000) was an American chemist and one of the African American scientists and technicians on the Manhattan Project, working at the University of Chicago.

== Early life and education ==
Scott was born in Florence, South Carolina, on October 19, 1922, the son of Benny and Viola Scott. He had two older sisters, Mary and Rosa.

Scott earned a Bachelor of Arts degree from Morehouse College, an HBCU (historically black college university), in 1942, where he later became president of the Alumni Club. In 1950, he earned a Master of Science degree from the University of Chicago.

== Career ==
During World War II from 1943 to 1946, Scott worked at the Met Lab, metallurgical laboratory, at the University of Chicago, as part of the instrumentation and measurements section; likely working on isotope isolation and fission, although records have been unclear. He was one of fifteen African-American scientists who contributed to the development the Manhattan Project, which was authorized by President Franklin D. Roosevelt on December 28, 1942, the year Scott graduated from Morehouse. The year before, President Roosevelt outlawed racial discrimination in the defense industries, Executive Order 8802 of 1941.

Scott described the project to the Chicago Daily Tribune as a "not only a successful experiment in physical science, but also in sociology". He added that working alongside white people maintained a fair spirit.

While getting his master's degree after the war, he also worked as a subcontractor and manufacturer of Geiger counters, instruments that are used to detect radiation, from 1946 to 1950. From 1949 to 1963, he served as a radiochemist and then chief chemist for the Nuclear Instrument Company (which was renamed to the Nuclear-Chicago Corporation). In 1963, Scott began working as a Technical Director for the New England Nuclear (NEN) Assay Corporation (Boston, Massachusetts). While there, he published several peer-reviewed journal articles, in journals such as Analytical Chemistry and Journal of Radioanalytical Chemistry, which is a top-tier journal in the chemistry field, as well as Atomic Energy Commission reports. Scott published his research efforts in the Journal of Radioanalytical Chemistry and several reports published by the Atomic Energy Commission in 1952, 1959, and 1961 focusing on radiometric methods and emission by uranium-235. Uranium-235 is used as a primary element used to power nuclear reactions and embodies many chemical structures.

Following his scientific career, Scott became the executive director of United Mortgage Bankers of America, the trade association of black mortgage bankers in the United States. Following his time there, he returned to Sumter, SC in 1979 to teach at the University of South Carolina, briefly teaching Sumter High School and Hillcrest Middle School in 1985.

In 1969, Scott published his first book, The Coming of The Black Man.

== Personal ==
Scott married Bessie Joyce Sampson, of South Carolina, and had one son, Christopher Jehu Scott, in 1950. He later had a daughter, Joyce Scott Burton-Edwards.

He died on October 16, 2000, at the age of 77, at Tuomey Regional Medical Center, Sumter, South Carolina.
