= Jasper Brown Jeffries =

African American physicist

Jasper Brown Jeffries (April 15, 1912 - July 16, 1994) was an African American physicist, one of the few African Americans to work on the Manhattan Project.

== Early life and education ==
Jasper Brown Jeffries was born on April 15, 1912, in Winston-Salem, North Carolina. Jeffries attended West Virginia State College and earned his B.S. degree in 1933. After in 1937, Jeffries got engaged to his wife Marguerite Diffay. Together, they have three daughters. Later in 1940, Jeffries earned his master's degree in physical sciences from the University of Chicago.

== Career ==
After earning his degrees, Jeffries worked at the Met Lab from 1943 to 1946 as physicist on the Manhattan Project. While working at the Met Lab, Jeffries signed the Szilárd petition that requested President Truman to avoid dropping atomic bombs on Japan. After the Manhattan project, atomic bombs were developed, and World War II ended. After working at the Met Lab, Jeffries served as a Professor and Chair in the Department of Physics at North Carolina Agricultural & Technical University, from 1946 to 1949. Next, from 1951 to 1959, Jeffries was a Senior Engineer for the Control Instrument Company. Then, from 1963 to 1971 Jeffries was an Assistant Professor of Mathematics at Westchester Community College. Jasper Brown Jeffries was promoted to professor and became chair of department in 1971.

== Later life ==
Jasper Brown Jeffries died on July 16, 1994, in White Plains, NY. When Jeffries died, he was eighty-two years old.
