= Lloyd Quarterman =

American biochemist

Lloyd A. Quarterman
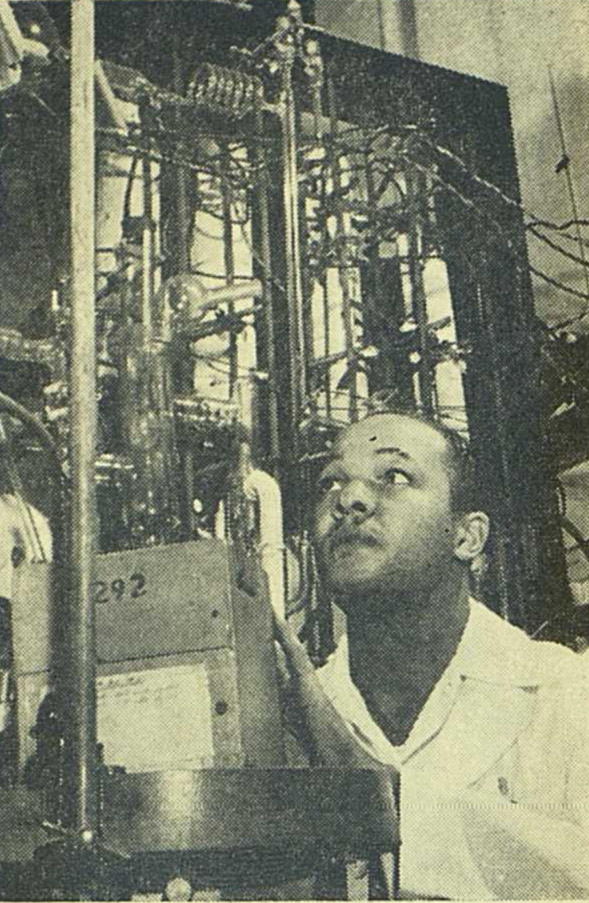
- Born: May 31, 1918; Philadelphia, Pennsylvania, US
- Died: 1982; Chicago, Illinois
- Education: St. Augustine's College, Northwestern University
- Scientific career
- Fields: gaseous diffusion method of obtaining fissionable materials
- Workplaces: Manhattan Project, Argonne National Laboratory

Lloyd Albert Quarterman (May 31, 1918 – July 1982) was an American chemist working mainly with fluorine. During the Second World War, he was one of the first six African American scientists and technicians on the Manhattan Project.

== Life ==
Born on May 31, 1918, in Philadelphia, Pennsylvania, he displayed a love of the scientific method early in life, frequently experimenting with chemistry sets. As a young man, Quarterman attended St. Augustine's College in Raleigh, North Carolina, where he earned his bachelor's degree in 1943.

== Career ==
After earning his degree, Quarterman was hired to work on the Manhattan Project. As one of the few African Americans to work on the project, Quarterman was chiefly responsible for the design and construction of a special distillation system for purifying large quantities of hydrogen fluoride. This hydrogen fluoride would be used to separate the Uranium isotope U-235 for the construction of the atomic bombs. The U-235 that Quarterman helped accumulate was used to make Little Boy, the uranium bomb that was exploded over Hiroshima, Japan, in 1945. After the war, Quarterman was presented with a certificate of recognition for his development of the Atom Bomb and his contribution to the conclusion of World War II.

There were two primary laboratories associated with the Manhattan Project; one at the University of Chicago and the other at Columbia University. At the University of Chicago, Quarterman worked under Dr. Enrico Fermi, a notable Italian physicist. While at Columbia University, Quarterman worked with Albert Einstein. After the war, Quarterman worked at the then newly established Argonne National Laboratory in Chicago, Illinois, where he continued to work for over 30 years. At Argonne, Quarterman was an assistant to the associate research scientist and chemist from 1943 to 1949. He assisted with the first nuclear reactor for atomic-powered submarines. Quarterman graduated from Northwestern University with a Master of Science in 1952. After graduating, Quarterman continued his work with F, synthesizing new compounds by reacting F with noble gases, especially xenon. These compounds were surprising because noble gases were considered unable to combine with other atoms at the time. After several years of influential work, Lloyd Quarterman received an honorary Ph.D. in chemistry from St. Augustine's College in 1971. Quarterman remained a member of the Chicago chapter of the NAACP and gave frequent lectures, inspiring African Americans to pursue education in the sciences.

== External sources ==
- Black History Pages: Dr. Lloyd Quarterman
