= Virgil Garnett Trice Jr. =

African-American chemical engineer (1926-1997)

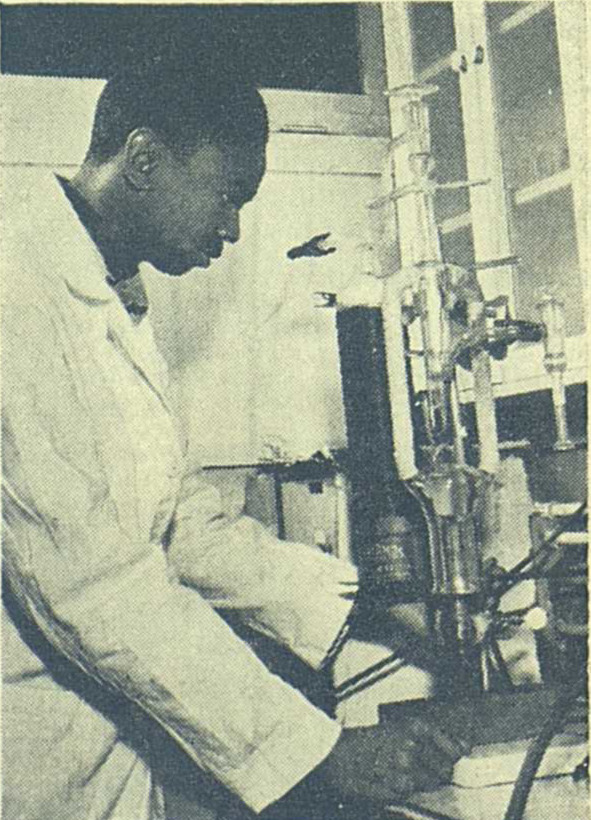
Virgil Trice

Virgil Garnett Trice Jr. was one of few African-American chemical engineers during the 20th century in the United States.

== Education ==
Trice was born on February 3, 1926, in Indianapolis. Trice obtained three degrees within the discipline of engineering: Bachelor of Science in Chemical Engineering from Purdue University, Master of Science in Chemical Engineering from Purdue University, and a Master of Science in Industrial Engineering from Illinois Institute of Technology.

== Career ==
Subsequent to his education, Trice enlisted into the navy, the highest rank he achieved being ensign. Throughout his career, Virgil worked part time as an associate professor of Chemical Engineering at Howard University. For twenty-two years of his career, from 1949 to 1971, Trice worked at the Argonne National Laboratory as a chemical engineer. Trice's contributions here earned him a profile on Ebony magazine. Then, in 1971 Trice became a member of the Atomic Energy Commission. His work consisted of transforming atomic matter into useful items for the medical and industrial field. He also researched possible nuclear fuel reprocessing, while still considering the economical aspect of it. After he finished at Argonne National Laboratory, Trice went on to be a nuclear waste management engineer, employed by the Nuclear Regulatory Commission until it dissolved, and then for the Energy Research and Development Administration. Finally, his last position was for the U.S. Department of Energy where he worked as a program manager and senior program analyst in radioactive waste management.

Trice lived to be 71, dying on October 31, 1997, in Gaithersburg.
