= Sylvanus A. Tyler =

American nuclear biostatistician and mathematician

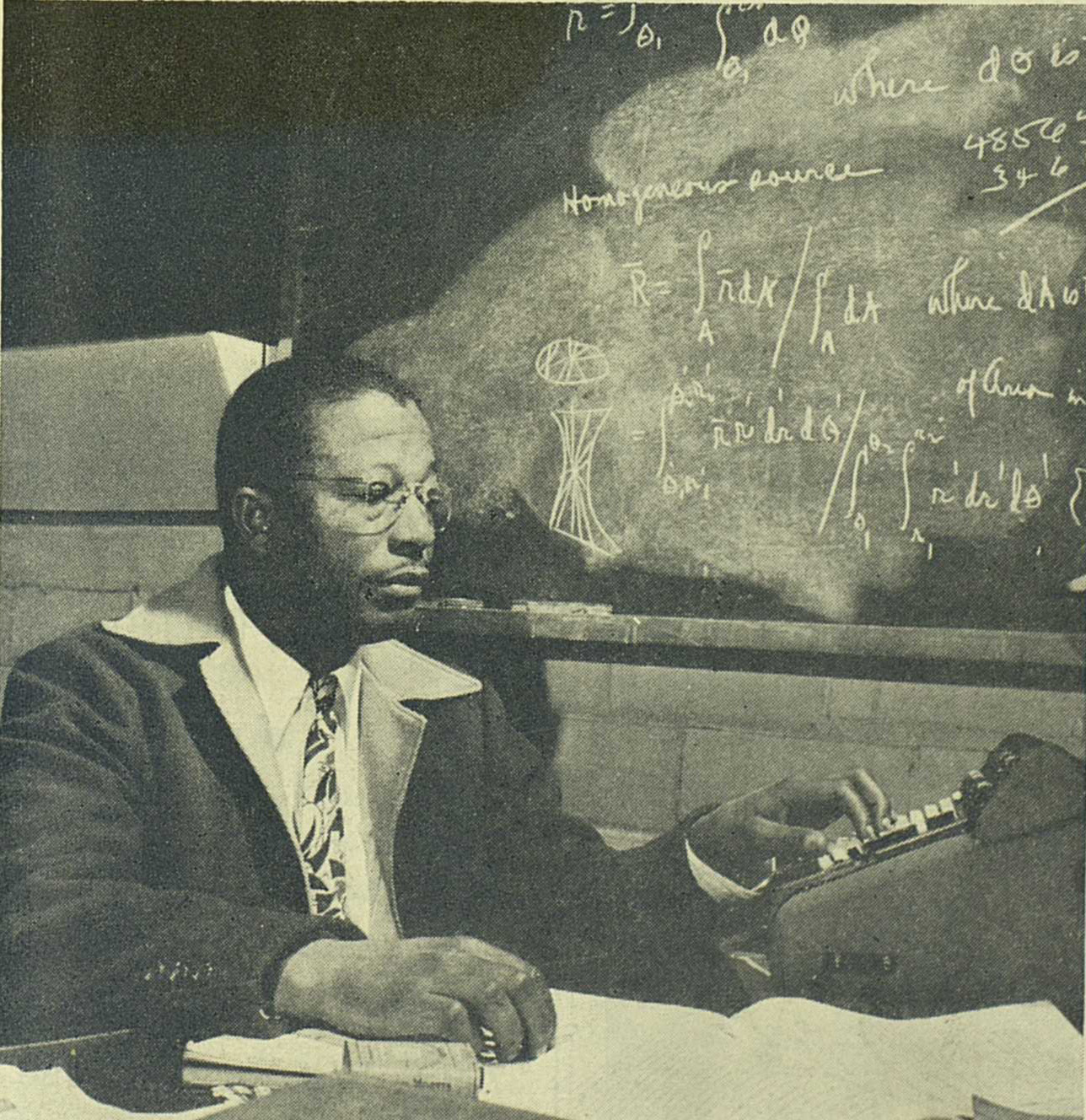
- Photograph of Tyler in 1949
- Born: August 21, 1914; Chicago, Illinois, U.S.
- Died: July 23, 1986 (aged 71); Chicago, Illinois, U.S.
- Education: Fisk University; University of Chicago
- Known for: Manhattan Project
- Spouse: Addie Marion Butler (1906 - 1986)
- Children: 2 (Sylvia Langford and Sylvanus A. Tyler Jr.)
- Scientific career
- Fields: Biostatistics
- Workplaces: Argonne National Laboratory; Metallurgical Laboratory

Sylvanus A. Tyler Sr. (August 21, 1914 – July 23, 1986) was an American mathematician and biostatistician. Tyler worked on the Manhattan Project at the Argonne National Laboratory, where he was one of the few African American mathematicians assigned to the project.

== Life and career ==
Tyler was born in Chicago in 1914 and attended city public schools. He earned an undergraduate degree from Fisk University and a master's degree from the University of Chicago. During World War II, Tyler served in the United States Army Signal Corps and was stationed in Italy.

Tyler becan working at the Argonne National Laboratory in 1946 and worked at the lab for 34 years, retiring in 1980. Tyler also served as faculty at Tougaloo College and Alabama A&M University. Tyler was published in over 75 journal articles during his career.

After his retirement, Tyler continued to support the Argonne lab and the United States Department of the Interior as a statistical consultant.

== Death ==
Tyler died in July 1986 at the age of 71. His obituary was published in the Chicago Tribune.

== Recognition ==
In 1949, Tyler was featured in an Ebony magazine article titled "Atom Scientists: Ten Negro Scientists at Argonne Lab Help in Race to Harness Atomic Materials."
