= Edwin R. Russell =

African American chemist

Edwin Roberts Russell (1913 – 1996) was an American chemist. He was one of the few African American to work on the Manhattan Project, researching the isolation and extraction of plutonium-239 from uranium at Chicago's Met Lab.

== Early life and education ==
Russell was born June 19, 1913 in Columbia, South Carolina.

In 1935, Russell earned his B.S. degree from Benedict College, and in 1937 earned his M.S. Degree in Chemistry from Howard University. While working as a chemistry assistant and instructor at Howard University from 1936 to 1942, Russell decided to further his career at the University of Chicago earning a PhD in surface chemistry in 1942.

== Career ==
Russell worked on the Manhattan Project from 1942 to 1946 at the University of Chicago's Met Lab, researching the isolation and extraction of plutonium-239 from uranium. In 1947 to 1953, Edwin served as chairman of the Division of Science at Allen University in Columbia, SC. From 1953 to 1976, Russell worked at Savannah River Nuclear Laboratory in Aiken, South Carolina.

Edwin R. Russell received an Honorary Doctorate Of Science from Benedict College. He died on April. 7, 1996 at the age 82 while living in Waverly Historic District (Columbia, South Carolina). In honor of Edwin R. Russell, the South Carolina Legislature declared Russell “One of South Carolina's ablest and distinguished leaders".
