= Robert Johnson Omohundro =

Nuclear Physicist

- Born: June 21, 1921; Norfolk, Virginia
- Died: May 15, 2000 (aged 78); Washington University hospital
- Education: Howard University
- Known for: Contributions to the Manhattan Project
- Scientific career
- Fields: Nuclear physics
- Workplaces: Naval Research Laboratory

Robert Johnson Omohundro (June 21, 1921 – May 15, 2000) was a nuclear physicist who contributed to The Manhattan Project's efforts in the atomic bomb development during World War II. Omohundro's notable work included aiding in the creation of radiation detection devices, portable neutron detectors, and holding patents for scintillation counters and selective detectors for fission neutrons.

== Early life and education ==
Robert Johnson Omohundro was born on June 21, 1921, in Norfolk, Virginia, to Henry Omohundro and Brownie Pierce Omohundro. He had a younger sister named Gladice and four half-siblings, Joseph, Mildred, Annie Mae, and Dorothy.

Omohundro graduated from Booker T. Washington high school in his hometown then went to work for the Western Electric Company as a radio tester. Later, he earned a bachelor’s degree in mathematics and a master’s in physics from Howard University in Washington, D.C. He was also a member of the Alpha Phi Alpha fraternity, which is the oldest and largest African American fraternity and made huge contributions to the fight for African Americans' civil rights.

== Career ==
Robert Johnson Omohundro was a research nuclear physicist for the Naval Research Laboratory in Washington. He worked at the laboratory from 1948 to 1984 for 36 years. Some of his most notable work included being a part of the Manhattan Project where he helped develop the atomic bomb, created instruments for measuring, and identified radiation emissions coming from nuclear warheads. He also developed a satellite-based system to detect vacuum ultraviolet radiation and a mass spectrometer carried by rockets for studying in the upper atmosphere. Additionally, he worked on airport screening devices to identify fissionable materials and portable neutron detectors supplied to the International Atomic Energy Agency to prevent plutonium proliferation. Along with his work on the projects, Omohundro received two patents in nuclear physics and contributed as an author or co-author to over 40 scientific articles. During his time working on the Manhattan Project, he was subjected to keeping everything done on the job a secret. While being part of the Manhattan Project during World War II, he worked on a secret test facility located in Arizona. The secret test facility worked on developing devices to locate radiation emissions.

Omohundro lived to be 78 years old and died of cardiac arrest on May 15, 2000 in the Washington University hospital.
