= Ralph Gardner-Chavis =

African American chemist and researcher

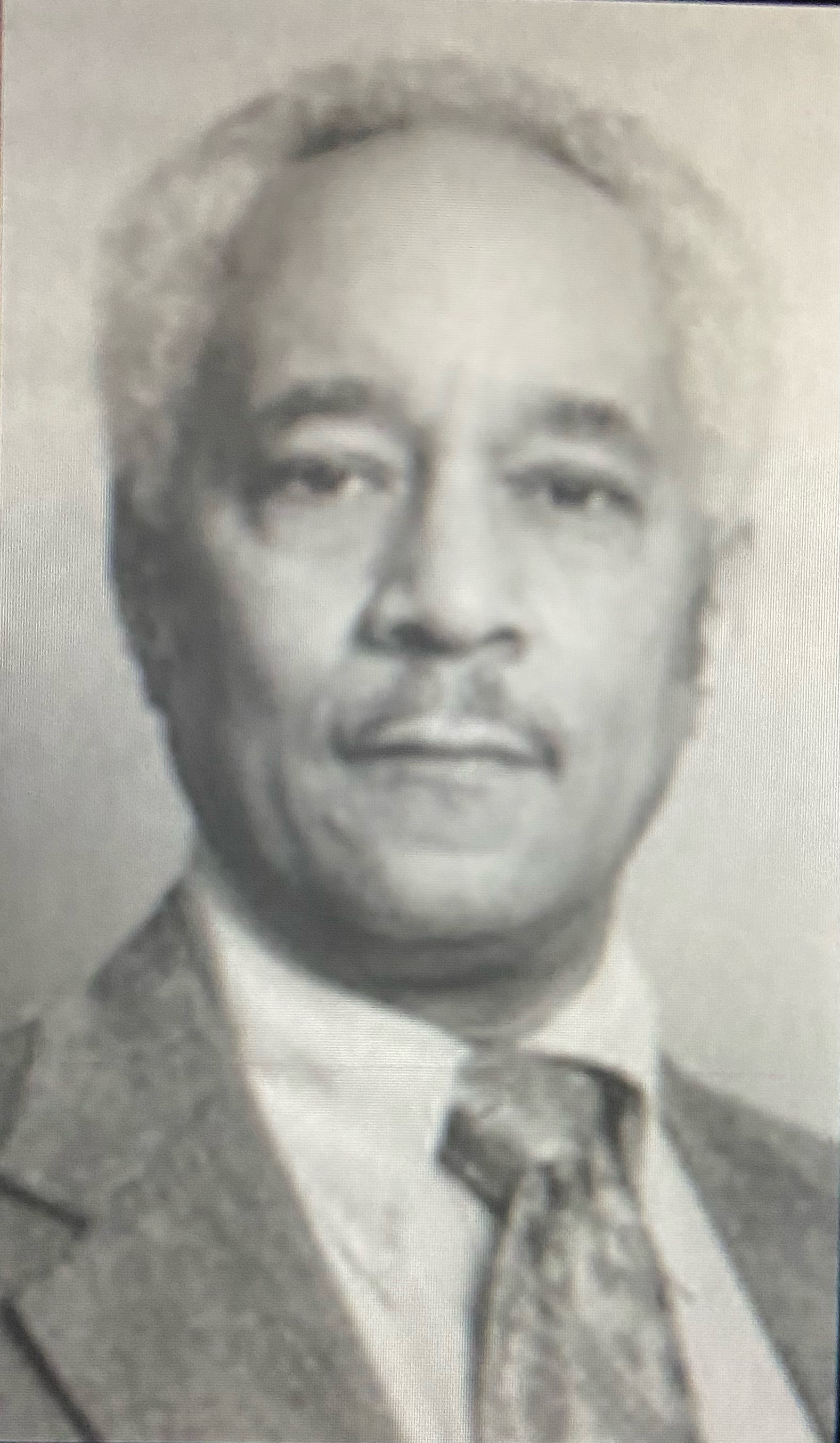
- Born: December 3, 1922; Cleveland, Ohio, U.S.
- Died: March 27, 2018 (aged 95)
- Education: Case Western Reserve University
- Known for: Involvement in the Manhattan Project
- Scientific career
- Workplaces: Argonne National Laboratory; Standard Oil of Ohio; Cleveland State University; Molecular Technology Corporation

Ralph Gardner-Chavis (December 3, 1922 – March 27, 2018) was an African American researcher, chemist, and educator. He is best known for his involvement in the Manhattan Project, where his research on plutonium would be used to develop the Fat Man atomic bomb. After working on the Manhattan Project, he became a professor at Cleveland State University. He was a major proponent of diversity and racial inclusion in academic studies. He died at age 95 on March 27, 2018.

== Early life and education ==
Ralph Gardner-Chavis was born in Cleveland, Ohio on December 3, 1922. His given name was Richard Alexander Gardner. His father was a musician named Clarence Chavis Gardner, and his mother was a government worker for a welfare department named Vivian Hicks Gardner. He attended both Bolton Elementary School and Audubon Junior High School. He would then go on to attend John Adams Highschool, which is where his passion for chemistry began to develop.

After graduating high school in 1939, he began attending college at the Case School of Applied Science in 1939. The school attempted to place him in a food service position, which he felt was not his true goal in life. For part of his college career, he traveled west and attended the University of California at Berkley. He would eventually complete his bachelor's degree at the University of Illinois at Urbana-Champaign in the year 1943. He would later complete his graduate degrees at Case Western Reserve University in Cleveland Ohio. It was at Cape Western Reserve University where he would earn his master's degree in chemistry in 1952, and his PhD in chemistry in 1959.

== Career and contributions to science ==
Gardner-Chavis began work as a research assistant at the Argonne National Laboratory in Chicago in 1943. This job would become the start of his involvement with the Manhattan Project. He had taken this job shortly after earning his bachelor's degree. He had taken the job in order to avoid getting drafted in WW II, but he also took it in order to still contribute to the war effort. While working on the project, he worked closely with radiology scientist Nathan Sugarman and nuclear scientist Enrico Fermi. Gardner-Chavis was part of a small handful of black scientists who dedicated their time and effort to the Manhattan Project. His research in plutonium led to the development in America's first atomic bomb, the Fat Man, which was used to end WW II in 1945.

Despite Gardner-Chavis's involvement with the Manhattan project, he had trouble finding a job as a chemist after the war ended. For this reason, he took a job waiting tables in Cleveland from 1947 until 1949. Eventually, Ohio's Standard Oil hired him as a project leader and a research chemist. He remained in this position for roughly 20 years. Gardner-Chavis later took a teaching position for the chemistry department at the Cleveland State University. He remained a full-time faculty member at the university from 1968 until 1985. As a college professor, Gardner-Chavis expressed interest in early childhood learning and development. As a result, started a program with his adult program with his students advocating the importance of reading to infant children. Gardner-Chavis also proposed that African American and multi-racial studies should be taught at CSU, and he fervently battled for these courses to be taught. Gardner-Chavis also worked in a research lab for the Molecular Technology Corporation. While working for the Molecular Technology Corporation, he became a member of their board of directors and served as a vice president of research. He would incorporate elements of his teaching with the research he conducted for the corporation. While continuously working on his research in molecular technology and catalysis, Gardner-Chavis gained emeritus status at the CSU Department of Chemistry.

Gardner-Chavis published countless academic articles throughout his career. By 2001, he had become a member of the American Institute of Chemical Engineers (AIChE). Dr. Ralph Gardner-Chavis joined, as a partner, the Spectrum Blue Steel company in 2009. He died at age 95 on March 27, 2018.

In 2008, Gardner-Chavis and other researchers theorized that without Spectroscopy at the beginning, catalysis research proceeded in the wrong direction for more than 100 years.

Ralph Gardner added “Chavis” to his surname later in life to honor John Chavis who in 1792 became the first African American to enroll in Princeton University.

== See also ==
- African-American scientists and technicians on the Manhattan Project
