= Blanche J. Lawrence =

African-American biochemist (1920–1989)

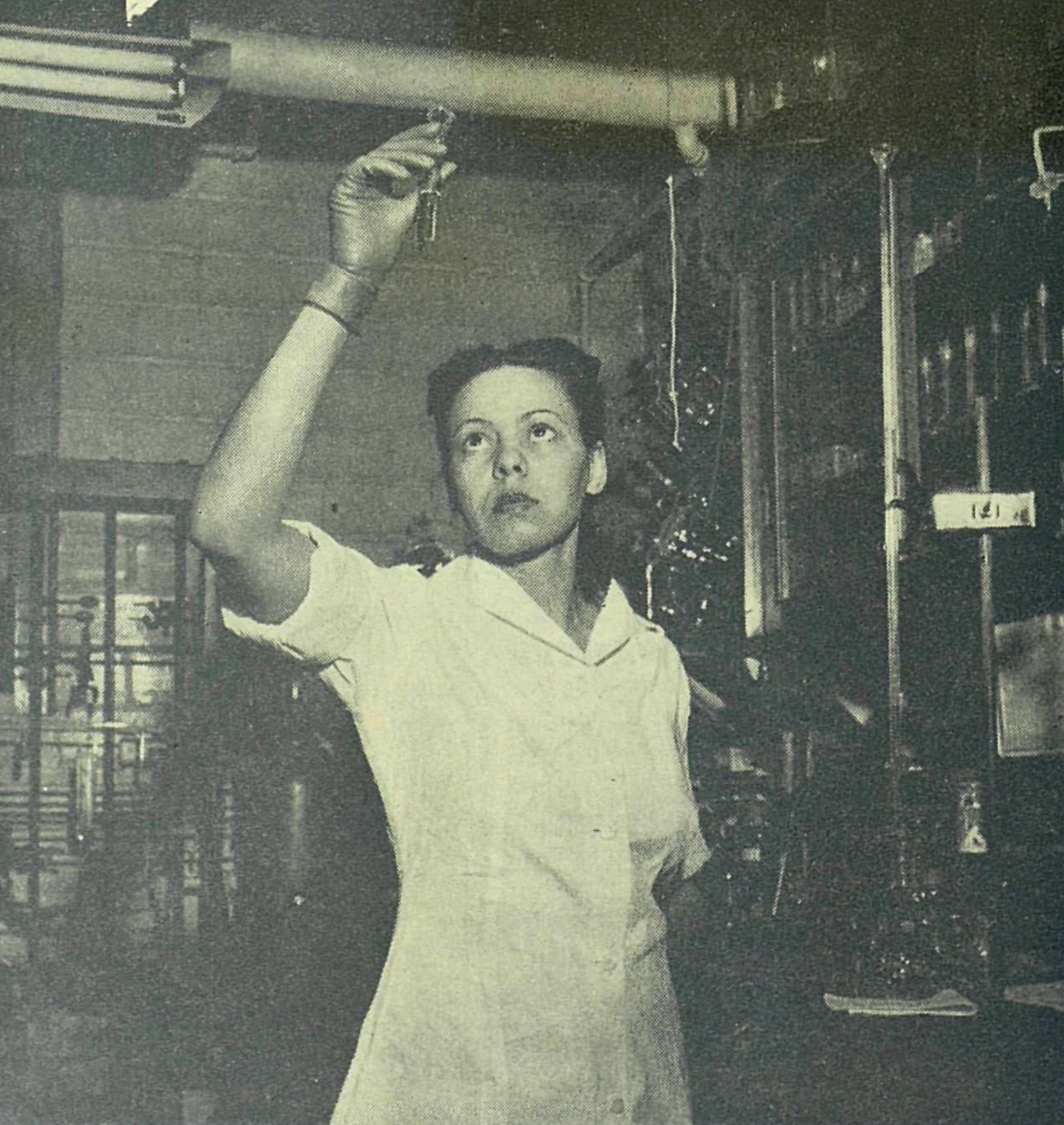
- Born: June 18, 1920
- Died: February 9, 1989 (aged 68)
- Education: Tuskegee University
- Spouses: Erwin Lawrence; Robert Holloway
- Scientific career
- Workplaces: University of Chicago; Argonne National Laboratory

Blanche J. Lawrence (June 18, 1920 – February 9, 1989) was an African-American biochemist who originally began work as a research assistant in the Health Division of the University of Chicago's Metallurgical Laboratory during the Manhattan Project. After World War II, Lawrence continued her career at the Argonne National Laboratory and became a junior biochemist after four years in 1949. During this time, Lawrence was publicized in an edition of Ebony Magazine featuring "Atom Scientists".

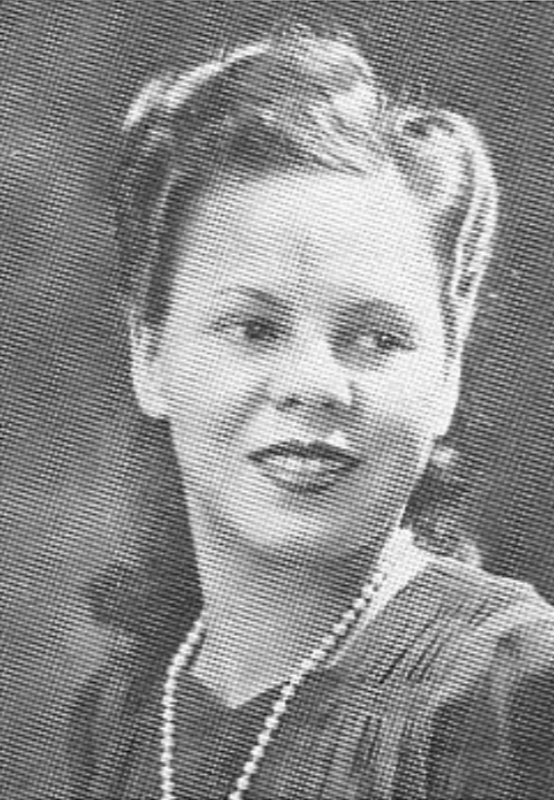
Blanche Jackson Lawrence, 1943, Tuskegee Yearbook

Blanche Jackson Lawrence of Aurora, Illinois graduated from Tuskegee University in 1943. She was married to Captain Erwin Lawrence, a 99th Pursuit Squadron pilot who was killed during World War II. While attending Tuskegee University, Lawrence joined the Creative Dance Group, as well as the Physical Education Club.

== Selected publications ==
- Norris, W. P., and Lawrence, Blanche J. "Determination of Calcium in Biological Materials". Analytical Chemistry, vol. 25, no. 6, 1953, pp. 956–960., doi: 10.1021/ac60078a031.

== See also ==
- African-American scientists and technicians on the Manhattan Project
