= Cynthia Hall (scientist) =

American nuclear scientist and poisons expert

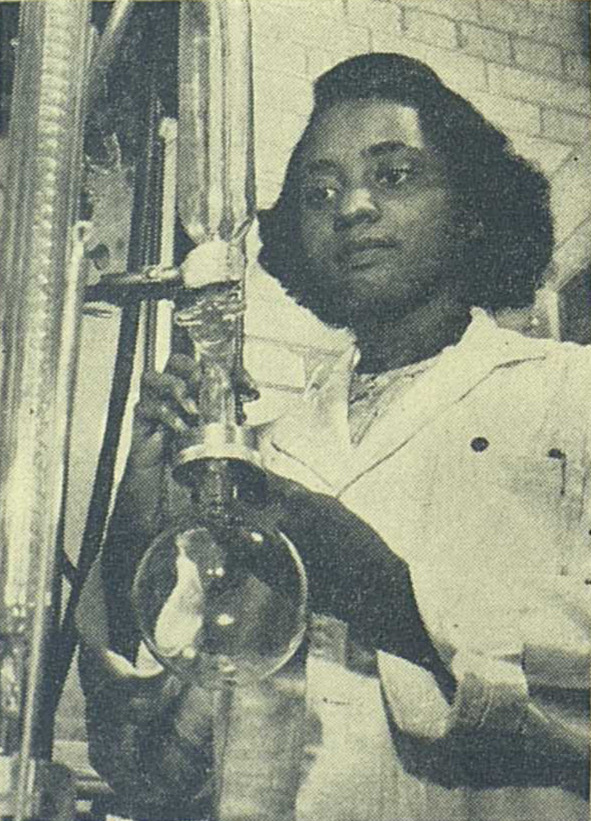
- Photograph of Hall in 1949
- Known for: Manhattan Project
- Scientific career
- Fields: Nuclear Chemistry, Poison
- Workplaces: Argonne National Laboratory; Metallurgical Laboratory

Cynthia Hall (1922/3? - ?) was an American nuclear scientist and expert in poisons. She worked on the Manhattan Project at the Argonne National Laboratory, where she was one of the few female African American scientists assigned to the project.

== Career ==
Hall began her career as a researcher in a morgue where she analyzed the effects of poisons on humans. In the 1940s, Hall began working at the Metallurgical Laboratory at the University of Chicago. In the role, she analyzed potential solutions for radiation poisoning. She worked at the Argonne National Laboratory as a researcher for the 10-member analytical group of the Chemical Engineering Division during the Manhattan Project.

== Recognition ==
In 1949, age 26, Hall was featured in an Ebony magazine article titled "Atom Scientists: Ten Negro Scientists at Argonne Lab Help in Race to Harness Atomic Materials."

In 2020, Hall was featured in a 'Women in Stem' series by the Science History Institute. In 2021, Hall was recognized by the National Museum of Nuclear Science & History during Black History Month for "remarkable" contributions to nuclear sciences.
