= Lawrence H. Knox =

American chemist (1906–1966)

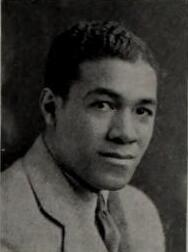
- Born: 30 September 1906; New Bedford
- Died: 6 January 1966; Mexico City
- Education: Bates College, Stanford University
- Occupation: Chemist
- Employers: Manhattan Project; Morehouse College
- Relatives: William Jacob Knox Jr., Clinton E. Knox

Lawrence Howland Knox (September 30, 1906 – January 6, 1966) was born in New Bedford, Massachusetts and died of carbon monoxide poisoning at Colegio Vista Hermosa, Mexico City. He was among the first African-Americans to receive a PhD in chemistry, following his eldest brother William Jacob Knox Jr. (1904–1995). Both brothers were among the African American scientists and technicians on the Manhattan Project. Lawrence worked with Paul Doughty Bartlett on an experiment for testing organic mechanisms in chemistry which involved the use of the molecule bicyclo(2.2.1)heptane, a type of bicyclic molecule. Additionally, Lawrence made significant contributions such as publishing papers about aromatic hydrocarbon molecules and proved Erick Hückel's theory about aromatic hydrocarbons correct.

== Family ==
In the 1820s Elijah Knox -grandfather of Lawrence- was born in North Carolina to a slave family. Through hard-work and determination he became an expert carpenter then bought his freedom in 1846. He travelled North and settled in New Bedford, Massachusetts. Elijah's son -William Jacob- established an important precedent for future generations of upward mobility through education. William received the highest score on the New Bedford civil-service exam in 1903 and then acquired a position at the post-office in 1905. He eventually married Estella and the two had 5 children; two daughters and three sons (William, Lawrence, and Clinton).

All three sons went on to become distinguished experts in their respective fields of study. William Jacob graduated from Harvard University with a PhD in chemistry and joined Lawrence as a part of the Manhattan Project. Their youngest brother, Clinton E. Knox, also graduated from Harvard University, with a PhD in history, and he served as an ambassador to Dahomey (now Benin, 1964–69) and Haiti (1969–73). By 1935, the Knox family made up a total of 7% of all African Americans to hold a PhD in chemistry.

== Education ==
In 1928, Knox received a Bachelor of Science degree in chemistry at Bates College. During his attendance at Bates College he participated in numerous extracurriculars; member of the Jordan Scientific Society and lettered football as a right halfback. For two years after his graduation, Knox taught chemistry at Morehouse College in Atlanta. In 1930, Lawrence started at Stanford University and after one year he received a Master of Science degree. Knox continued his education at Harvard University and received his doctorate in organic chemistry in 1940. His dissertation was titled "Bicyclic structures prohibiting the Walden inversion. Replacement reactions in 1-substituted 1-apocamphanes".

== Career ==
For four years after his graduation from Harvard University, with limited options due to his race, Knox returned to teaching chemistry at what is now North Carolina Central University in Durham, North Carolina. He is considered a pioneer of the Beta Theta Lambda Chapter, which was founded in May 7th, 1938 in Durham. In 1944, Knox worked for the Division of War Research at Columbia University where he studied radiation. His work was utilized in research for the Manhattan Project in regards to the effects of atomic bombs. After the war, Knox found an industrial position at the chemical company Nopco in Harrison, New Jersey.

In 1948, he was invited by William von Eggers Doering (with whom he had worked during his time at the Division of War Research) to become the resident director at the Hickrill Chemical Research Foundation in Katonah, New York, where they specialized in long-term, speculative research.

Throughout his career, Knox was an inspiration and a kind-hearted coworker to those around him. Doering described him as "the finest experimental coworker I ever had." Meanwhile, Knox inspired a number of youths to become experts in chemistry, including Maitland Jones Jr., who went on to become a professor at Princeton University and New York University, and Caleb Finch, who is a professor in neurobiology at the University of Southern California.

Knox is credited with at least two U.S. Patents, Production of Arecoline accepted on May 2, 1950 and Photochemical Preparation of Tropilidenes in 1953.

Knox was head of the chemistry department at North Carolina Central University and taught at North Carolina Agricultural and Technical State University.

== Personal life ==
Knox married a woman named Hazel, and they had a son. Their relocation to Katonah in 1948 was met with staunch opposition from the local white community, who demanded that they live in the marginal district reserved for Black residents known as Greenville. Consequently, Sylvan and Ruth Weil, the philanthropists who founded Hickrill Chemical Research Foundation, built a home for the Knox family on their estate. The family faced not only residential isolation but also persistent social isolation during their time in Katonah. They joined the local Episcopal church and personally invited residents to their house for a party, only to be shunned by the predominantly white community.

With the foundation's closure in the late 1950s, the estate on which Knox's house was built was sold, and Knox's marriage fell apart. He divorced Hazel and remarried the foundation's former secretary, a white woman named Anne Juren. The couple moved to Mexico City after Knox worked with Laboratorios Syntex S.A., a small pharmaceutical company. There, Lawrence and Anne adopted a local baby, Naomi. Knox died of carbon monoxide poisoning in 1966, an accident due to a kerosene heater.
