= Ella Tyree =

American medical researcher

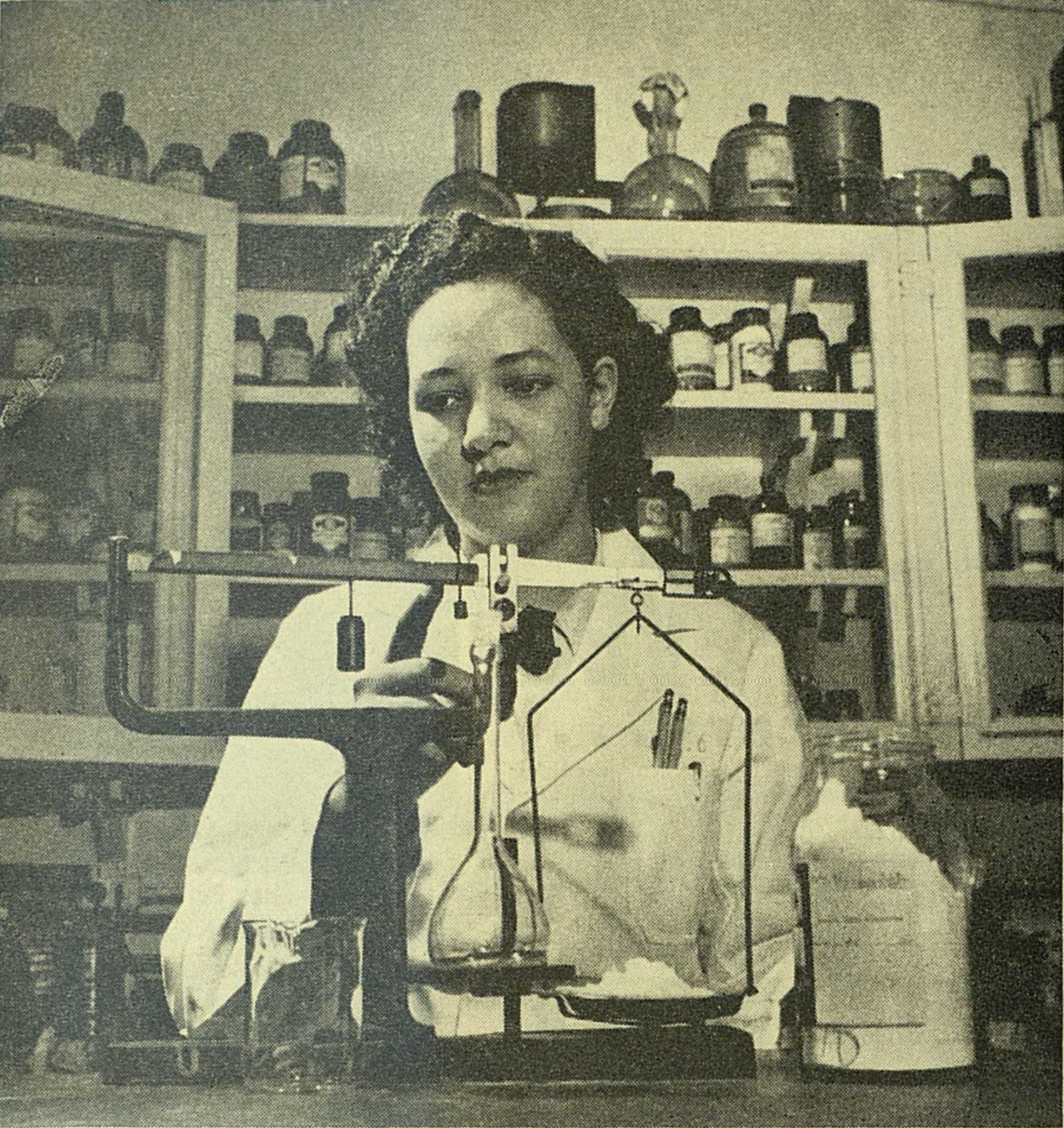
- Born: 13 March 1920; Kentucky
- Died: 2 February 1989 (aged 68)
- Alma mater: Spelman College
- Academic career
- Institutions: Argonne National Laboratory

Ella Burton Tyree (March 13, 1920-February 2, 1989) was an American medical researcher. She worked in the mid-twentieth century investigating effects of radiation poisoning in animals and potential treatments.

== Education ==
Tyree was born in Battle Creek, Michigan on March 13 1920. Tyree attended Spelman College, graduated with a degree in physics in 1944. She also trained in biology.

== Career ==
In 1941, Executive Order 8802 was passed to prevent discriminatory hiring practices in defense and many Black Americans sought work in government projects related to the Manhattan Project. The type of position varied according to education and training, but there were scientists, technicians, construction workers, domestic workers and janitors. In the Jim Crow era, these positions were an opportunity for higher, stable pay and for advancement. However, segregation and racist practices in housing were still common.

Tyree became a laboratory technician at the Metallurgical Laboratory in Chicago during the Manhattan Project. She worked in the Health Division and managed the animal farm which supplied the researchers with subjects for radiation experiments. In 1949, her team, led by Dr. Harvey M. Patt, reported that preemptively treating mice with cysteine provided protection from normally-lethal radiation doses. They theorized that the amino acid could prevent damage to cells exposed to X-rays. The treatment could be delivered orally or by injection in the hour preceding radiation exposure, and led to approximate survival rates of 80% compared to 20% when untreated. It did not help after exposure. In addition to the growing interest in radiation research from the perspective of atomic weapons, it was also seen as a potential aid in cancer treatments to protect surrounding areas from radiation damage when administering high radiation doses.

Tyree died on February 2, 1989.

== Publications ==
- Nickson, James J; Lawrence, Walter; Rachwalsky, Irene; Tyree, Ella (1953). "Roentgen rays and wound healing:II. Fractionated irradiation an experimental study". YMSY Surgery. 34 (5): 859–862. ISSN 0039-6060. OCLC 4927667588.
- Smith, Douglas E.; Tyree, Ella B. (1954-05-01). "Influence of X-Irradiation Upon Body Weight and Food Consumption of the Rat". American Journal of Physiology. Legacy Content. 177 (2): 251–260. doi: 10.1152/ajplegacy.1954.177.2.251. ISSN 0002-9513.
- Smith, Douglas E.; Tyree, Ella B. (1955-12-31). "Influence of X-Irradiation Upon Water Consumption by the Rat". American Journal of Physiology. Legacy Content. 184 (1): 127–133. doi: 10.1152/ajplegacy.1955.184.1.127. ISSN 0002-9513.
- Smith, Douglas E.; Tyree, Ella B. (1956). "Attempts to Provide the Rat with Nutrition during Post-Irradiation Anorexia". Radiation Research. 4 (5): 435–448. doi: 10.2307/3570265. ISSN 0033-7587.
- Gunter, Shirley E.; Kohn, Henry I.; Tyree, Ella B.; Laughlin, John S.; Ovadia, Jacques; Shapiro, Gerald; Thompson, Patricia (1956). "The Relative Biological Effectiveness of 180-Kevp and 22.5-Mevp X-Rays Determined from the Dose-Survival Curve of Saccharomyces cerevisiae". Radiation Research. 4 (4): 326–338. doi: 10.2307/3570213. ISSN 0033-7587.
- Kitagawa, Toshio; Glicksman, Arvin S.; Tyree, Ella B.; Nickson, James J. (1961). "Radiation Effects on Skin and Subcutaneous Tissue: A Quantitative Study of Collagen Content: Modification with l-Triiodothyronine". Radiation Research. 15 (6): 761–766. doi: 10.2307/3571112. ISSN 0033-7587.
- Clapp, Paul; Tayao, Manuel S.; Tyree, Ella B.; Nickson, James J.; Clarkson, Bayard; Lawrence, Walter (1964-08-01). "An experimental study of simultaneous irradiation and regional chemotherapeutic perfusion". Journal of Surgical Research. 4 (8): 371–376. doi: 10.1016/S0022-4804(64)80086-X. ISSN 0022-4804. PMID 14200441.
- Clapp, Paul; Charyulu, K. K. N.; Tayao, Manuel S.; Tyree, Ella B.; Nickson, James J.; Lawrence, Walter (1965). "Regional oxygenation and therapeutic response to irradiation. An experimental study". Cancer. 18 (8): 927–936. doi: 10.1002/1097-0142(196508)18:83.0.CO;2-K. ISSN 1097-0142.
- Tyree, Ella B.; Glicksman, Arvin S.; Nickson, James J. (1966). "Effect of L-Triiodothyronine on Radiation-Induced Pulmonary Fibrosis in Dogs". Radiation Research. 28 (1): 30–36. doi: 10.2307/3571925. ISSN 0033-7587.

== See also ==
- African-American scientists and technicians on the Manhattan Project
- History of radiation therapy
