= Nymph, Alabama =

Unincorporated community in Brownsville, Alabama

- Unincorporated community
- Location within Alabama Location within the United States
- Coordinates: 31°20′18″N 86°56′23″W
- Country: United States
- State: Alabama
- County: Conecuh
- Elevation: 318 ft (97 m)
- Time zone: UTC-6 (Central (CST))
  - Summer (DST): UTC-5 (CDT)
- Area code: 251
- GNIS feature ID: 133158

Nymph is an unincorporated community in Conecuh County, Alabama, United States.

== History ==
A post office operated under the name Nymph from 1901 to 1927.
