= Eric Porterfield =

American politician (born 1974)

Member of the West Virginia House of Delegates from the 27th district
- In office December 1, 2018 – December 1, 2020
- Preceded by: Marty Gearheart
- Succeeded by: Marty Gearheart

Personal details
- Born: Eric Earl Porterfield; November 17, 1974 (age 51) Princeton, West Virginia, U.S.
- Party: Republican
- Children: 2

Eric Earl Porterfield (born November 17, 1974) is an American politician and a former Republican member of the West Virginia House of Delegates, representing District 27, which includes parts of Mercer and Raleigh counties. First elected in 2018, Porterfield is the second blind person ever to serve in the West Virginia legislature. Alongside being known for being a physically disabled politician, Porterfield is also well known for his unwavering opposition to rights for LGBT people, who he has compared to terrorists and the Ku Klux Klan. He is on video expressing that, should his daughter or son come out gay, he would "see if they knew how to swim", implying he would drown them. In the June 2020 primary he was defeated in his bid for re-election, coming in last of Republican candidates running.

== Early life and education ==
Porterfield was born and raised in Princeton, West Virginia. Describing himself as a "pretty wild, out-of-control teenager", he later attended a Bible college at age 20. In 2006, at age 32, he was blinded as a result of a head injury received in a physical altercation. Porterfield has not discussed the cause or nature of the altercation, noting: "I can't fully get into all the details of it, because there's still some stuff pending on it, but a major altercation with a multitude of men ended up leaving me instantaneously blind on December 10, 2006."

According to a police report, the altercation occurred shortly after 3 a.m. in the parking lot of Cavanaugh's Sports Bar and Eatery in Schererville, Indiana. The responding officer indicated that he saw two individuals "jump" Porterfield after a verbal argument with Porterfield and another man, later identified as Steve McPherson. When the officer asked Porterfield what happened, Porterfield responded: "[You're] a cop so fucking figure it out." The officer further detailed that Porterfield was "very uncooperative" and "refused to answer any questions other than his name" or provide photo identification. Porterfield was initially charged with one count of misdemeanor disorderly conduct. Porterfield was taken to the emergency room by ambulance and diagnosed with bilateral globe perforation. Despite the severity of his injuries and resulting blindness, Porterfield declined to press criminal charges against anyone involved in the incident and declined to give a formal statement, leading police to discontinue the investigation.

Porterfield subsequently filed a civil personal injury action against the sports bar for negligent and/or reckless conduct in failing to take reasonable care for his safety as a patron. In a sworn deposition taken November 25, 2008, Porterfield stated he and McPherson arrived at Cavanaugh's around 11:00 p.m. on December 9, 2006, after leaving a strip club in Harvey, Illinois. According to the police report, a verbal altercation began shortly after 3:00 a.m. in the bar's parking lot after McPherson touched a woman without her consent. McPherson apologized to the woman, at which point Porterfield approached and asked: "What are you apologizing to this bitch for? You don't have to apologize." Porterfield then asked two of the woman's friends, Jesus Venegas and Jason Dorado: "What are you bitches going to do about it?" Dorado later stated in a sworn deposition that he then saw Porterfield knock down Venegas. According to Dorado, Anthony Acevedo, the woman's cousin, hit Porterfield, leading Dorado to put Porterfield in a headlock. Dorado stated he "poked [Porterfield's] eyes out" after Porterfield bit off part of Dorado's ear.

== Political career ==
=== Electoral history ===
Porterfield was spurred to run for political office after a Republican Mercer County magistrate granted a protective order against him and his wife; this was in response to their organizing a boycott of a local OB-GYN over her support of abortion rights. Porterfield has also cited his opposition to a law banning conversion therapy as a contributing factor in his decision to run. He succeeded incumbent delegate Marty Gearheart, who decided to forgo reelection in 2018 and seek West Virginia's 3rd congressional district seat. Porterfield was defeated in his re-election bid on June 9, 2020, coming in last of Republican candidates running.

He ran for the West Virginia State Senate, District 6, in 2024, placing third out of three Republican candidates in a primary. He ran for the same seat in 2026, but lost in the primary.

=== Political views ===
Porterfield strongly opposes LGBT rights. In February 2019, Porterfield faced criticism and calls to resign after he made a series of homophobic comments. After using the slur "faggot" in committee on February 6 while advocating for an amendment that would nullify local LGBT anti-discrimination ordinances, he appeared in interviews on February 8 calling the LGBT community "a modern day version of the Ku Klux Klan" and a "terrorist group". On February 10, when asked during a television interview on WVVA what he would do if his son and daughter ever came out to him as gay, Porterfield repeatedly responded that he would "see if they could swim" and declined to clarify what he meant. This was taken by many as implying he would drown them, though Porterfield later rejected this interpretation. West Virginia Republican Party chair Melody Potter denounced Porterfield's words as unacceptable, saying further that they were "hateful, hurtful, and do not reflect the values of our country, our state, and the Republican Party". In response, Porterfield refused to apologize and doubled-down on his original statements, calling LGBTQ people "brutal monsters".

=== Election results ===
2018 Republican primary, House of Delegates, District 27
Party	Candidate	Votes	%
Republican	John Shott	2,220	23.77%
Republican	Joe Ellington	2,033	21.77%
Republican	Eric Porterfield	1,854	19.85%
Republican	Zane Lawhorn	1,845	19.75%
Republican	Mike Swatts	1,388	14.86%

2018 general election, House of Delegates, District 27
Party	Candidate	Votes	%
Republican	John Shott	9,721	23.31%
Republican	Eric Porterfield	8,821	21.15%
Republican	Joe Ellington	8,729	20.93%
Democratic	Carol Bailey	6,066	14.55%
Democratic	Phoebe Meadows	4,208	10.09%
Democratic	Lacy Watson	3,373	8.09%
Mountain	Karen White	785	1.88%

2020 Republican primary, House of Delegates, District 27
Party	Candidate	Votes	%
Republican	Marty Gearheart	4,165	28%
Republican	Joe C. Ellington, Jr.	3,787	25%
Republican	Doug Smith	3,028	20%
Republican	Jeremiah Nelson	2,079	14%
Republican	Eric Porterfield	2,005	13%

== Personal life ==
Porterfield married Jessica (née Worrell) and has two children, Beth and John. They live in Princeton. He is a born-again Baptist missionary. He founded Blind Faith Ministries in 2012 and has done missionary work with the group in South Sudan, Venezuela, and Cuba. He is a member and holds a position at Rich Creek Baptist Church in Spanishburg, West Virginia. The pastor of Rich Creek Baptist, Jamie Mattox, is also Vice Chairman of Porterfield's Blind Faith Ministries. He is legally blind.
