= Lorton Lick, West Virginia =

- Unincorporated community
- Location within the state of West Virginia Lorton Lick, West Virginia (the United States)
- Coordinates: 37°19′47″N 81°14′33″W
- Country: United States
- State: West Virginia
- County: Mercer
- Elevation: 2,339 ft (713 m)
- Time zone: UTC-5 (Eastern (EST))
  - Summer (DST): UTC-4 (EDT)
- Area codes: 304 & 681
- GNIS feature ID: 1554997

Lorton Lick is an unincorporated community in Mercer County, West Virginia, United States. Lorton Lick is located on West Virginia Route 71, 1.5 miles (2.4 km) south-southeast of Montcalm.
