= East River (New River tributary) =

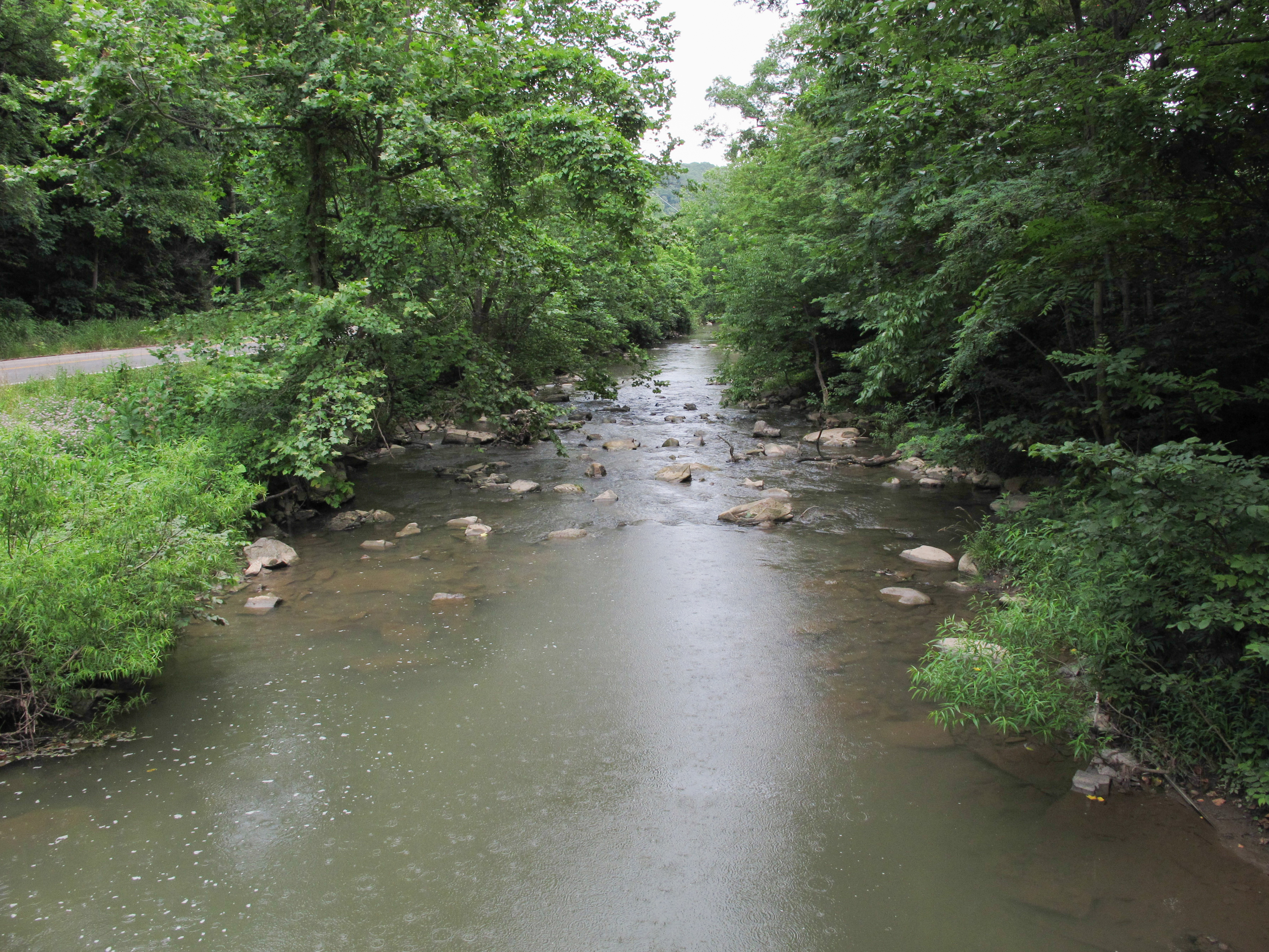
- The East River in Hardy, West Virginia

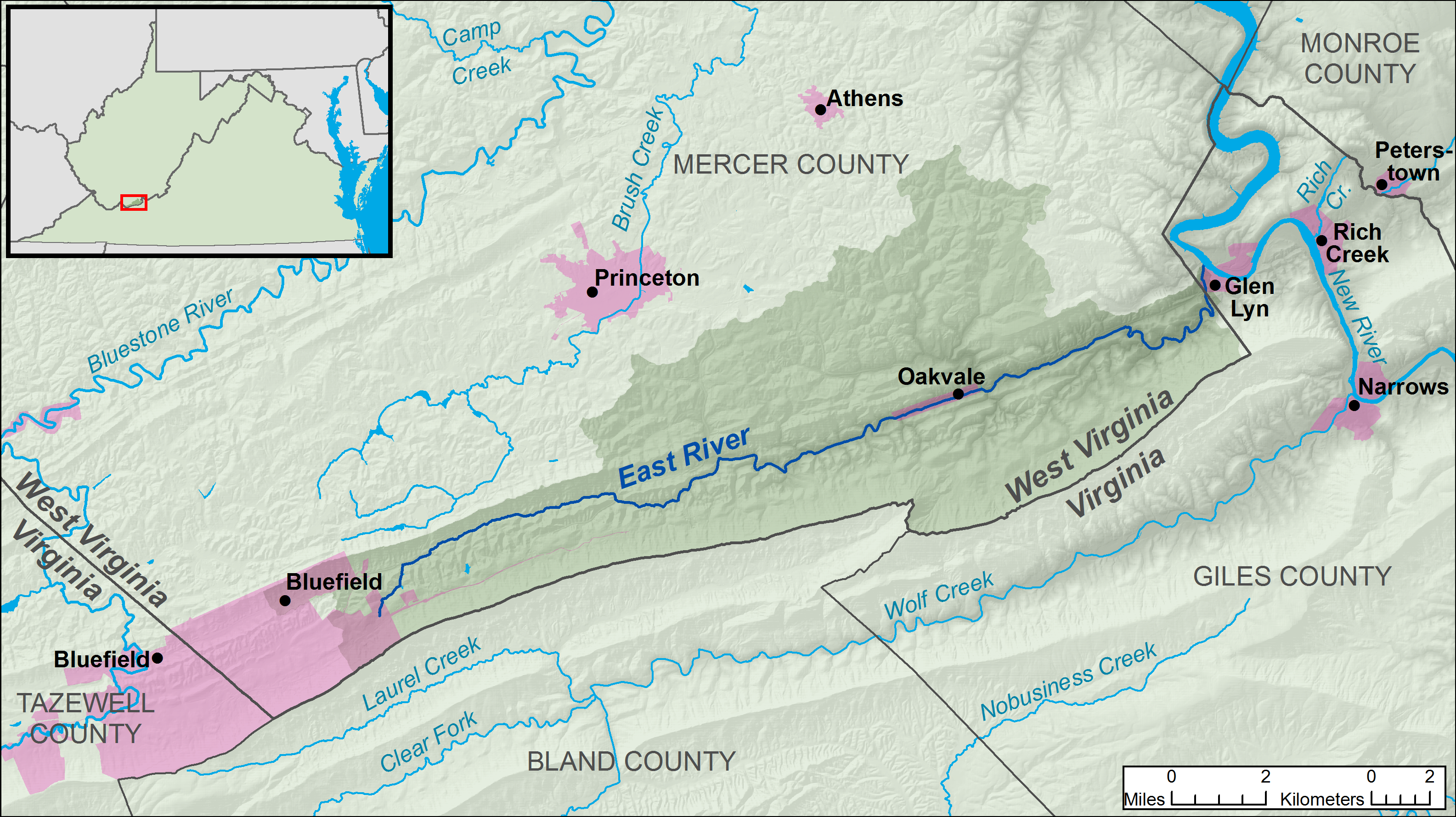
- A map of the East River and its watershed

Location
- Country: United States
- State: West Virginia, Virginia
- Counties: Mercer, Giles

Physical characteristics
- Source
  - location: Bluefield, West Virginia
  - coordinates: 37.2815066°N 81.1753726°W
  - elevation: 2,304 ft (702 m)
- Mouth: New River
  - location: Glen Lyn, Virginia
  - coordinates: 37.3740097°N 80.8670240°W
  - elevation: 1,489 ft (454 m)
- Length: 24 mi (39 km)
- Basin size: 76.4 sq mi (198 km^{2})

Basin features
- Hydrologic Unit Codes: 050500020603, 050500020604 (USGS)

The East River is a tributary of the New River, 24 miles (39 km) long, in southern West Virginia and southwestern Virginia in the United States. Via the New, Kanawha and Ohio rivers, it is part of the watershed of the Mississippi River, draining an area of 76.4 square miles (198 km^{2}) in the Ridge-and-Valley Appalachians.

The East River was named for its easterly course. It rises from East River Mountain in Mercer County, West Virginia, in the eastern part of the city of Bluefield, and flows generally east-northeastward through southern Mercer County, generally in parallel to East River Mountain to its south, through the unincorporated communities of Ada, Ingleside, and Hardy; the town of Oakvale; and the unincorporated communities of Kellysville and Willowton. It flows into the New River soon after entering Virginia, in the town of Glen Lyn in Giles County. The stream is paralleled for much of its course upstream of Oakvale by West Virginia Route 112, and downstream of Oakvale by U.S. Route 460.

== See also ==
- List of rivers of Virginia
- List of rivers of West Virginia
