= Spanishburg, West Virginia =

- Unincorporated community
- Nickname: The Burg
- Location within the state of West Virginia Spanishburg, West Virginia (the United States)
- Coordinates: 37°26′45″N 81°07′12″W
- Country: United States
- State: West Virginia
- County: Mercer
- Elevation: 2,060 ft (630 m)

Population (2020)
  - Total: 208
- Time zone: UTC-5 (Eastern (EST))
  - Summer (DST): UTC-4 (EDT)
- ZIP code: 25922
- Area codes: 304 & 681
- GNIS feature ID: 1555678

Spanishburg is an unincorporated community in Mercer County, West Virginia, United States. Spanishburg is located on U.S. Route 19, 9 miles (14 km) north of Princeton. The Bluestone River flows northward through the community. Spanishburg has a post office with ZIP code 25922. Spanishburg has a population of around 200.

The first pioneer settlers were James Calahan and Robert McCullock, who surveyed and claimed the land. The community was named after Spanish Brown, a family member of Calahan who settled in the region soon after. The community expanded with settlers from Virginia and North Carolina. The first church constructed in the region was a Baptist church. The community was first electrified in the fall of 1936.

Spanishburg is served by PikeView High School, alongside the communities of Athens, Matoaka, and Oakvale.
