= Hatcher, West Virginia =

- Unincorporated community
- Location within the state of West Virginia Hatcher, West Virginia (the United States)
- Coordinates: 37°21′57″N 80°58′41″W
- Country: United States
- State: West Virginia
- County: Mercer
- Elevation: 2,028 ft (618 m)
- Time zone: UTC-5 (Eastern (EST))
  - Summer (DST): UTC-4 (EDT)
- Area codes: 304 & 681
- GNIS feature ID: 1551386

Hatcher is an unincorporated community in Mercer County, West Virginia, United States. Hatcher is 7 miles (11 km) east of Princeton.
