= Gardner Junction, West Virginia =

Unincorporated community in West Virginia, United States

- Unincorporated community
- Location within the state of West Virginia Gardner Junction, West Virginia (the United States)
- Coordinates: 37°23′45″N 81°05′08″W
- Country: United States
- State: West Virginia
- County: Mercer
- Elevation: 2,405 ft (733 m)
- Time zone: UTC-5 (Eastern (EST))
  - Summer (DST): UTC-4 (EDT)
- Area codes: 304 & 681
- GNIS feature ID: 1554531

Gardner Junction is an unincorporated community in Mercer County, West Virginia, United States. Gardner Junction is 2.5 miles (4.0 km) north-northeast of Princeton.
