= Giatto, West Virginia =

Unincorporated community in West Virginia, United States

- Unincorporated community
- Location within the state of West Virginia Giatto, West Virginia (the United States)
- Coordinates: 37°25′03″N 81°15′21″W
- Country: United States
- State: West Virginia
- County: Mercer
- Elevation: 2,395 ft (730 m)
- Time zone: UTC-5 (Eastern (EST))
  - Summer (DST): UTC-4 (EDT)
- Area codes: 304 & 681
- GNIS feature ID: 1554550

Giatto is an unincorporated community in Mercer County, West Virginia, United States. Giatto is 1 mile (1.6 km) west of Matoaka.

The community was named after Giotto, an Italian artist (a recording error by postal officials accounts for the error in spelling, which was never corrected).
