= West Virginia Route 71 =

State highway in West Virginia, United States

West Virginia Route 71

Route information
- Maintained by WVDOH
- Length: 11.3 mi (18.2 km)

Major junctions
- South end: US 52 / CR 52/16 in Bluewell
- North end: WV 10 in Matoaka

Location
- Country: United States
- State: West Virginia
- Counties: Mercer

Highway system
- West Virginia State Highway System; Interstate; US; State
← I-70	→ WV 72

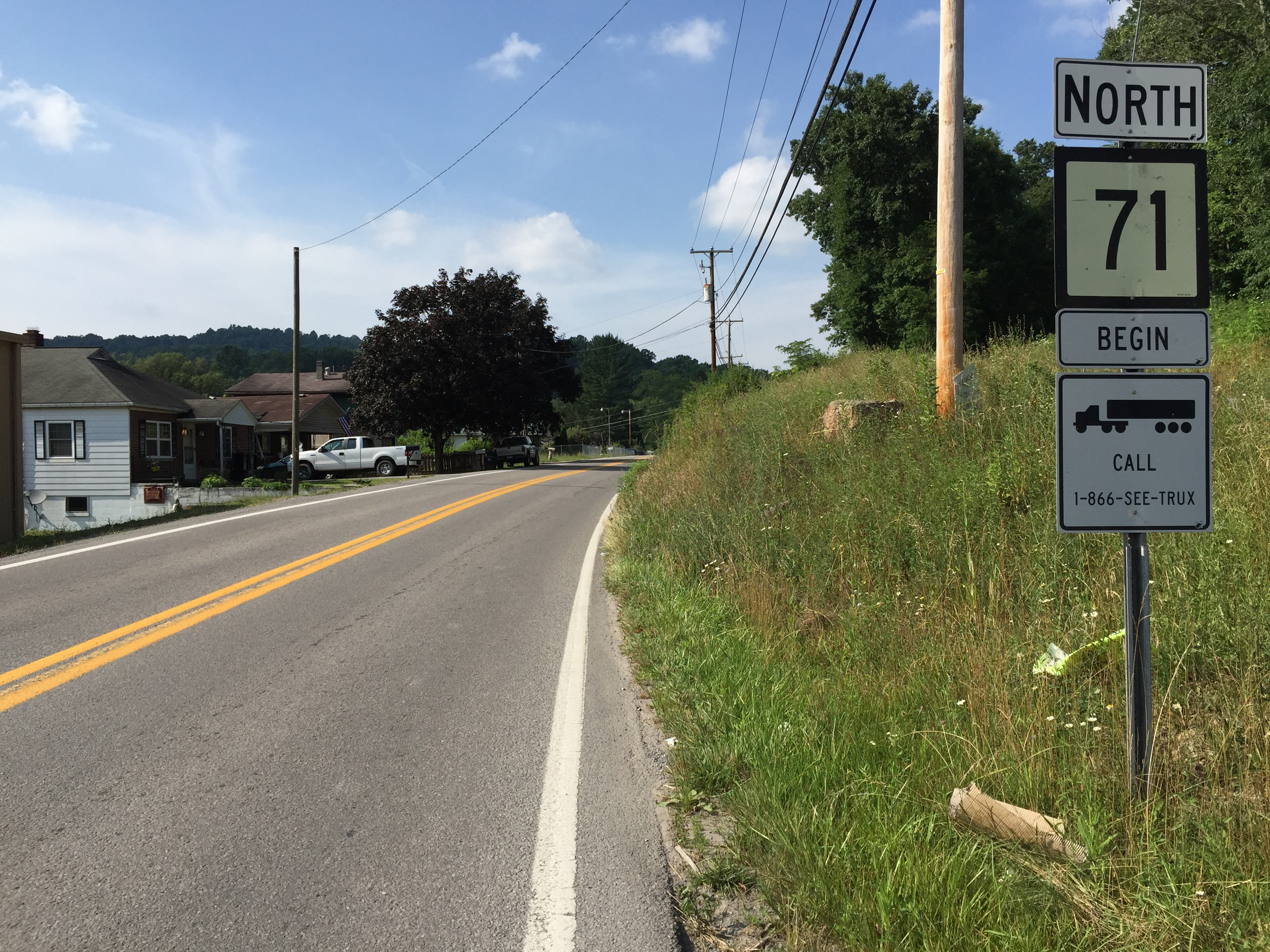
View north along WV 71 at US 52 in Bluewell

West Virginia Route 71 is a north–south state highway located within Mercer County, West Virginia. The southern terminus of the route is at U.S. Route 52 in Bluewell, north of Bluefield. The northern terminus is at West Virginia Route 10 in Matoaka.

== Major intersections ==
The entire route is in Mercer County.

Location	mi	km	Destinations	Notes
Bluewell			US 52 / CR 52/16 (Cutoff Road)	
Matoaka			WV 10 – Matoaka, Princeton	
1.000 mi = 1.609 km; 1.000 km = 0.621 mi
