= Maple Acre, West Virginia =

- Unincorporated community
- Location within the state of West Virginia Maple Acre, West Virginia (the United States)
- Coordinates: 37°19′27″N 81°08′18″W
- Country: United States
- State: West Virginia
- County: Mercer
- Elevation: 2,441 ft (744 m)
- Time zone: UTC-5 (Eastern (EST))
  - Summer (DST): UTC-4 (EDT)
- Area codes: 304 & 681
- GNIS feature ID: 1551992

Maple Acre is an unincorporated community in Mercer County, West Virginia, United States. Maple Acre is located near U.S. Route 19, 3.5 miles (5.6 km) south-southwest of Princeton.
