= Pinoak, West Virginia =

- Unincorporated community
- Location within the state of West Virginia Pinoak, West Virginia (the United States)
- Coordinates: 37°26′44″N 81°12′28″W
- Country: United States
- State: West Virginia
- County: Mercer
- Elevation: 2,739 ft (835 m)
- Time zone: UTC-5 (Eastern (EST))
  - Summer (DST): UTC-4 (EDT)
- Area codes: 304 & 681
- GNIS feature ID: 1555364

Pinoak is an unincorporated community in Mercer County, West Virginia, United States. Pinoak is 2.5 miles (4.0 km) northeast of Matoaka.

The community was named after the nearby Pinoak School.
