= List of killings by law enforcement officers in the United States, January 2012 =

This is a list of people reported killed by non-military law enforcement officers in the United States in January 2012, whether in the line of duty or not, and regardless of reason or method. The listing documents the occurrence of a death, making no implications regarding wrongdoing or justification on the part of the person killed or officer involved. Killings are arranged by date of the incident that caused death. Different death dates, if known, are noted in the description. The table below lists 32 people.

== January 2012 ==
Date	Name (age) of deceased	City, State	Description
2012‑01‑31	Raymond LaMadeleine	Roy, Washington	Officers were serving an arrest warrant to Roy after he had threatened to kill neighbors and shot at them. When police and SWAT arrived, LaMadeleine allegedly began firing at them with an assault rifle, and they shot him to death with one round.
2012-01-30	Antwain White (17)	Brooklyn, New York	Shot once in the chest after hitting an off-duty detective in the face with a wooden cane. White and another individual had approached the detective from behind in an attempt to mug him.
2012-01-29	Jackie Spalding Jr.	Bluewell, West Virginia	State troopers and county officers responded to a report of a man armed with a rifle and found Spalding in a vehicle behind a cemetery mausoleum. Spalding refused State Trooper J.R. Coburn's commands to show his hands and reportedly began to reach for his rifle, and the trooper shot Spalding to death.
2012-01-28	Jason Edward Prostrollo	Scottsdale, Arizona	Prostrollo was shot to death by officers after holding pool cues in a threatening manner and approaching officers. Police had responded to a 911 call from a woman who said a man with a knife was fighting with her boyfriend.
2012-01-27	Larry M. McKinney (37)	Fairview, Oregon	Larry's mother called 911 when her son showed up at her apartment drunk and she feared he would play loud music and get her evicted. She waited outside of her 2nd story apartment and met officers when they arrived. McKinney emerged at the top of the staircase holding a kitchen knife, and officers shot him to death after ordering him to drop the weapon.
2012-01-27	Alberto Covarrubias, Jr. (29)	Santa Maria, California	Covarrubias, a Santa Maria police officer, was shot and killed by a fellow officer as supervisors struggled to arrest him for an alleged sexual relationship with a 17-year-old Police Explorer.
2012-01-26	Christopher Kissane	Brooklyn, New York	Shot below his right eye by an off-duty officer. Kissane, 22, had just committed several armed robberies and shot at officers before he was killed.
2012-01-25	Brad Lee Morgan (21)	Portland, Oregon	Morgan called 911 saying he had committed a robbery and was going to jump off a building. He told the dispatcher he might be armed. Two officers located him atop a parking garage, and when they approached Morgan he pointed a black handgun at them. The officers shot him to death. The gun turned out to be a toy that had been spray painted.
2012-01-24	Edward Flener (72)	Chandler, Arizona	Officers shot and killed Flener after he allegedly pointed a gun at them. Police were responding to a report of a suicidal man.
2012-01-24	Kevin Carlson	Mesa, Arizona	Undercover officers attempted to arrest Carlson on parole violations. When the officers turned on the flashing lights of their unmarked vehicle, Carlson and another man started shooting. The officers returned fire, hitting both men, and killing Carlson.
2012-01-23	Christopher Kenney (23)	Stone Mountain, Georgia	Kenney was shot in a stolen pick-up truck after being cornered by 10 officers who blocked him in using their vehicles. Officers broke the truck window and tased Kenny multiple times as he rammed his truck into the squad cars, and then was shot by officers. Kenney had several outstanding warrants and was a primary suspect in several vehicle theft cases.
2012-01-23	Steven Rodriguez (22)	Monterey Park, California	Rodriguez had broken all of the windows in a restaurant with a metal bar when officers confronted him in the parking lot. An officer attempted to fire a taser at him, and Rodriguez allegedly approached that officer with the metal bar. Another officer fired 10 shots at Rodriguez, killing him.
2012-01-22	Beverly Kirk (43)	Pleasant Grove, Texas	A police officer in a marked car with lights and siren off was following an ambulance with lights and siren on. The officer struck Kirk when she "failed to yield the right of way to the marked police car."
2012-01-22	Elias Angel Ruiz (18)	Medford, Oregon	Officers responded after the teenager called 911 making suicidal threats. They found Ruiz on his front porch waving a butcher knife and attempted use of a stun gun. When that did not subdue him, another officer shot him to death.
2012-01-21	Christian Cobian (26)	Lancaster, California	Cobian, a 26-year-old Hispanic male, was killed by Los Angeles County Sheriffs on the 44200 block of 10th Street West in Lancaster. According to police, two deputies on patrol attempted to stop Cobian shortly before 11 p.m. near the intersection of 10th Street and Avenue J-4. Officials said Cobian was riding a bicycle without a headlight in a dimly lit area. As deputies approached, Cobian dropped his bicycle and ran into the rear of a nearby business. The deputies then chased him. The deputies alleged that he reached toward his waistband. Fearing for their safety, they opened fire. Cobian was pronounced dead at the scene. He was shot five times; once in the head, three times in the abdomen and once in the scrotum. The deputies were not injured. No weapon was found and no deputies were hurt.
2012-01-19	Roscoe Cambridge(29)	Anaheim, California	According to police, Cambridge approached an officer sitting in his cruiser in a parking lot while holding a large kitchen knife. The officer shot him to death. A knife and a bible were reportedly found near his body.
2012-01-16	unnamed man	Nassau County, New York	Police responded to report of a home invasion and found multiple people bound. A shoot-out ensued during which one burglar was killed and the other surrendered.
2012-01-13	Maksim Mayba (21)	Federal Way, Washington	An officer moved to arrest men in a parked car that she suspected were engaged in a drug deal and ordered a man to show his hands. When Mayba did not do as ordered, the officer fired twice, killing him.
2012-01-12	Duane Browne (26)	Brooklyn, New York	Officers responded to a report of an armed home invasion. When they arrived Dale Ogarro stepped out of the door with his hands up and told the officers there was not a problem. Moments later Duane Browne came out the door with a handgun. The officer fatally shot Browne with a single bullet when he failed to "freeze" and made a move. Browne lived with the Ogarro and had responded to the home invasion.
2012-01-12	Gregory Ehlers (34)	Hallandale Beach, Florida	Ehlers was fatally shot by officers investigating a recent theft of items from a store.
2012-01-12	Robert Long	Raytown, Missouri	Long was in his front yard when officers, responding to a "shots fired" call, arrived. Long was armed with a rifle and threatened to kill his roommate and officers. Officers fired when Long pointed the rifle at them.
2012-01-09	unnamed man	Houston, Texas	An officer responded to report of a home burglary. As officer arrived, three suspects fled. The officer caught one suspect who struggled with officer and reportedly attempted to take the officer's gun. Officer fatally shot suspect.
2012-01-09	Laura Zepeda (41)	San Antonio, Texas	Officer pursuing a stolen vehicle drove through a red light and collided with a vehicle not being pursued. The driver of the vehicle suffered severe head trauma and died on May 4, 2012.
2012-01-07	Bernie Cervantes	Anaheim, California	Police responded to report of a man shooting out lights and fatally shot Cervantes. The weapon was a BB gun.
2012-01-07	David Ledezma (52)	Riverside, California	Ledezma was shot to death by officers at his home after he threatened to kill himself with a knife and then threw pipes in their direction. Three officers fired 18 shots. Police had been called by a relative after Ledezma had allegedly struck his wife that day.
2012-01-07	unnamed man	Brighton, Colorado	Officers responded to report of a man threatening others with a gun. The suspect fled in a vehicle. Officers scattered tire-deflation devices which stopped the vehicle. Suspect exited vehicle and walked towards officers which what appeared to be a gun in his hand. After suspect ignored commands to drop the weapon an officer shot him.
2012-01-05	James Georgeson (20)	Medford, Oregon	Georgeson was shot to death by two U.S. marshals after he allegedly tried to crash into their patrol car. They were trying to arrest him for a federal probation violation. A U.S. Marshals Service spokesperson said there was no indication that Georgeson was armed.
2012-01-04	Jazmyne Eng (40)	Rosemead, California	Jazmyne Eng, a 40-year-old Asian woman, was shot and killed by sheriff's deputies Wednesday, January 4, in the 9300 block of East Valley Boulevard in Rosemead, according to Los Angeles County coroner's records. Eng appeared to be mentally ill as she held a hammer and allegedly threatened to strike people outside a mental health clinic Wednesday afternoon.
2012-01-04	Jaime Gonzalez (15)	Brownsville, Texas	Shot at least twice by officers in a middle school after refusing to put down his gun, later determined to be a pellet gun. Authorities had been called by the school who reported that a student had a gun and then put the school on lockdown.
2012-01-01	Kathy Porter	Atlanta, Georgia	An officer responding to a call drove through a red light at an intersection, striking another vehicle. Several occupants of the other vehicle were injured and Porter was killed. Witnesses report the squad car had lights on, but no siren.
2012-01-01	Michael Smith	Chicago, Illinois	Officers investigated an alley after hearing gunfire. They identified themselves to a man holding a gun and ordered him to drop his weapon. The suspect fled and the officers pursued. When the suspect turned towards the officers and pointed a handgun in their direction, they shot him. He died at a local hospital.
2012-01-01	unnamed man	Kansas City, Kansas	An officer was conducting a pedestrian check on a suspicious individual and a struggle ensued, during which the officer shot the man to death.

== See also ==
- Death in custody § United States
- Henry A. Wallace Police Crime Public Database
- List of cases of police brutality
- List of countries with annual rates and counts for killings by law enforcement officers
- List of law enforcement officers killed in the line of duty in the United States
- List of law enforcement officers convicted for an on-duty killing in the United States
- List of shootings by US immigration agents
- List of police reforms related to the George Floyd protests
- List of unarmed African Americans killed by law enforcement officers in the United States
- Lists of killings by law enforcement officers
- Police brutality in the United States
- Police misconduct § United States
- Police riot § United States
- Police use of deadly force in the United States
