= Lovern, West Virginia =

- Unincorporated community
- Location within the state of West Virginia Lovern, West Virginia (the United States)
- Coordinates: 37°26′03″N 80°52′31″W
- Country: United States
- State: West Virginia
- County: Mercer
- Elevation: 1,847 ft (563 m)
- Time zone: UTC-5 (Eastern (EST))
  - Summer (DST): UTC-4 (EDT)
- Area codes: 304 & 681
- GNIS feature ID: 1554921

Lovern is an unincorporated community in Mercer County, West Virginia, United States. Lovern is 8 miles (13 km) east of Athens.

Lily Lovern, an early postmaster, gave the community her name.
