= Mercer Street =

Mercer Street may refer to:

- Mercer Street, London
- Mercer Street (Manhattan)
- Mercer Street (Princeton, New Jersey)
- Mercer Street (Seattle)
- Mercer Street Historic District, Princeton, West Virginia
- MT Mercer Street, the oil tanker involved in the 2021 Gulf of Oman incident
