= Lashmeet, West Virginia =

Lashmeet
- Census-designated place (CDP)
- Location in Mercer County and the state of West Virginia.
- Coordinates: 37°25′22″N 81°11′48″W
- Country: United States
- State: West Virginia
- County: Mercer

Area
  - Total: 0.750 sq mi (1.94 km^{2})
  - Land: 0.750 sq mi (1.94 km^{2})
  - Water: 0 sq mi (0 km^{2})
- Elevation: 2,533 ft (772 m)

Population (2020)
  - Total: 409
  - Density: 545/sq mi (211/km^{2})
- Time zone: UTC-5 (Eastern (EST))
  - Summer (DST): UTC-4 (EDT)
- ZIP codes: 24733
- GNIS feature ID: 2586841

Lashmeet is a census-designated place (CDP) in western Mercer County, West Virginia, United States. It lies along West Virginia Route 10 northwest of the city of Princeton, the county seat of Mercer County. Although Lashmeet is unincorporated, it has a post office, with the ZIP code of 24733. As of the 2020 census, its population was 409 (down from 479 at the 2010 census).

The community most likely derives its name from the local Lashmeet (or Lashmutt) family.
