= Virginian Railway Yard Historic District =

Historic district in West Virginia, United States

- U.S. National Register of Historic Places
- U.S. Historic district
- Location within West Virginia Location within the United States
- Location: 0.5 mi. N of jct. of WV 20 and RR tracks, Princeton, West Virginia
- Coordinates: 37°22′41″N 81°5′11″W
- Area: 33 acres (13 ha)
- Built: 1905
- Architectural style: Romanesque
- NRHP reference No.: 03000351
- Added to NRHP: May 1, 2003

Virginian Railway Yard Historic District is a national historic district located at Princeton, Mercer County, West Virginia. The district includes 14 contributing buildings, 1 contributing site, and 1 contributing structure related to the Virginian Railway property at Princeton. Many date to the founding of the railway in 1905–1909, with others related to a physical improvements campaign in the 1920s. A number of the buildings are a vernacular interpretation of the Romanesque Revival style. They include the Locomotive Erecting Shop, transfer table pit (c. 1905), machine shop foundations, three water pump houses (c. 1910–1920), North Repair Shop (c. 1925), Brick Storehouse (c. 1940), and Car Wheel Shop (c. 1905).

It was listed on the National Register of Historic Places in 2003.
