= James Hale (disambiguation) =

James Hale (1810-1865) was a politician.

James Hale may also refer to:

- Dr. James W. Hale House

== See also ==
- James Hales, English judge, Baron of the Exchequer
