= Cashers Hill, West Virginia =

Unincorporated community in West Virginia, United States

- Unincorporated community
- Location within the state of West Virginia Cashers Hill, West Virginia (the United States)
- Coordinates: 37°26′52″N 80°53′19″W
- Country: United States
- State: West Virginia
- County: Mercer
- Elevation: 2,126 ft (648 m)
- Time zone: UTC-5 (Eastern (EST))
  - Summer (DST): UTC-4 (EDT)
- Area codes: 304 & 681
- GNIS feature ID: 1557154

Cashers Hill is an unincorporated community in Mercer County, West Virginia, United States. Cashers Hill is 7 miles (11 km) east-northeast of Athens.
