= Ada, West Virginia =

Unincorporated community in West Virginia, United States

- Unincorporated community
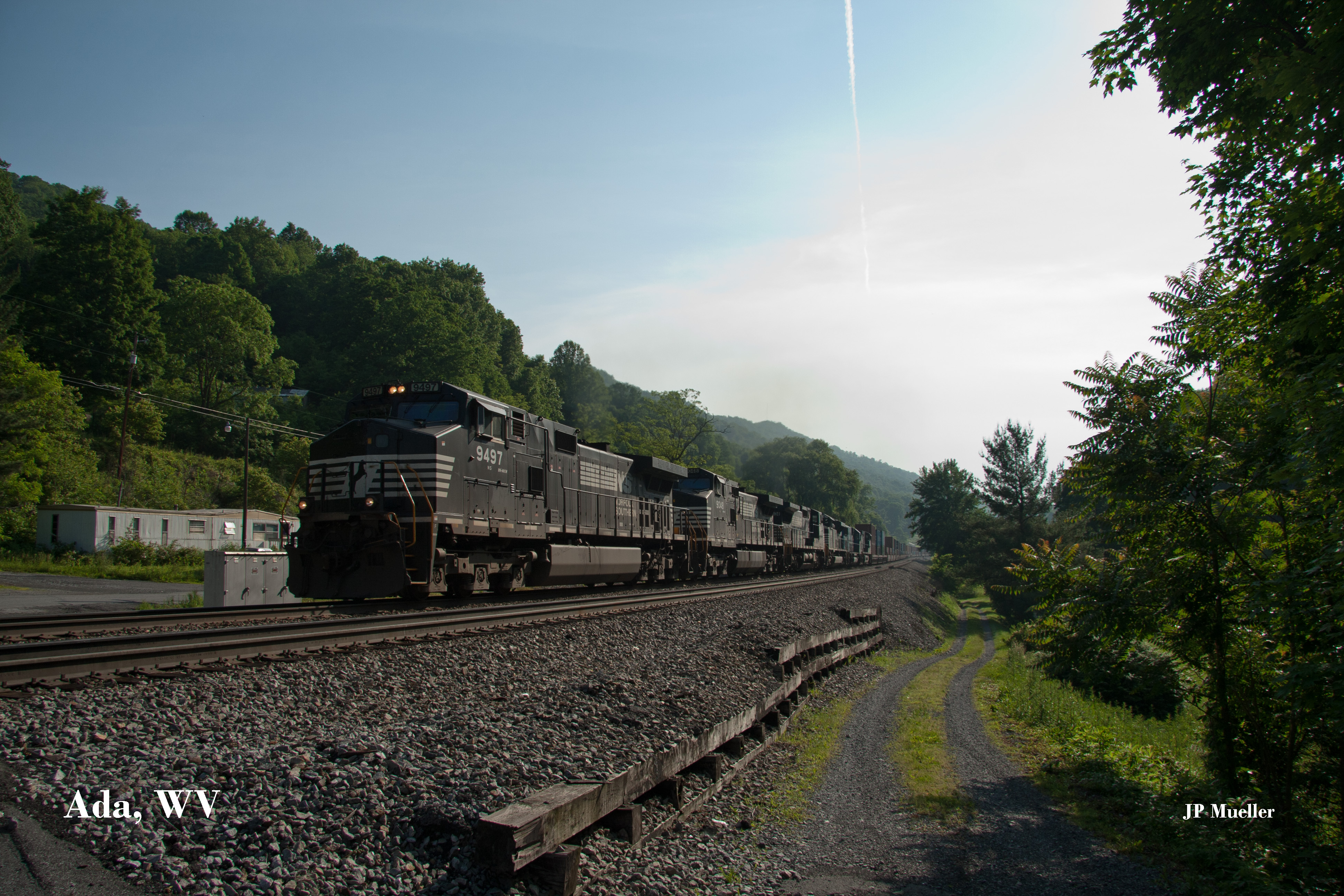
- A Norfolk Southern train passes through Ada on the Christiansburg District

- Location within the state of West Virginia Ada, West Virginia (the United States)
- Coordinates: 37°17′41″N 81°08′48″W
- Country: United States
- State: West Virginia
- County: Mercer
- Elevation: 2,280 ft (690 m)
- Time zone: UTC-5 (Eastern (EST))
  - Summer (DST): UTC-4 (EDT)
- Area codes: 304 & 681
- GNIS feature ID: 1553691

Ada is an unincorporated community in Mercer County, West Virginia, United States. Ada is located on the Norfolk Southern Railway Christiansburg District line and West Virginia Route 112, 4.5 miles (7.2 km) east-northeast of Bluefield, in the East River valley. The community has also been known as Long Falls.

Ada was named for a young local girl.
