= Kellysville, West Virginia =

- Unincorporated community
- Location within the state of West Virginia Kellysville, West Virginia (the United States)
- Coordinates: 37°20′41″N 80°55′40″W
- Country: United States
- State: West Virginia
- County: Mercer
- Elevation: 1,673 ft (510 m)
- Time zone: UTC-5 (Eastern (EST))
  - Summer (DST): UTC-4 (EDT)
- ZIP code: 24732
- Area codes: 304 & 681
- GNIS feature ID: 1551631

Kellysville is an unincorporated community in Mercer County, West Virginia, United States. Kellysville is 2 miles (3.2 km) northeast of Oakvale. Kellysville has a post office with ZIP code 24732.
