= Howard Wellman =

American political leader (born 1944)

Howard Wellman (born July 23, 1944, in Bluefield, West Virginia) is a political leader who has held multiple state offices in West Virginia and currently serves as 49th Sergeant at Arms of the West Virginia Senate.

== Education ==
Wellman is a 1962 graduate of Montcalm High School in Montcalm, West Virginia and completed a Bachelor of Science degree at Bluefield State College.

== Personal life ==
Wellman is the son of David and Betty Wellman. He is married to Beverly (Crane) Wellman and has two children Wendy and Jennifer.

== Political career ==
Wellman served the State of West Virginia as Assistant to the Commissioner of the Department of Highways from 1978 to 1980. He then served as Assistant to West Virginia Governor Jay Rockefeller from 1981 to 1984 when he was appointed to the West Virginia House of Delegates in 1984 to fill a vacancy created by the death of Don Anello. He was elected to the House of Delegates in his own right in 1986 and served until 1988, when he was forced to leave to address personal health issues. He returned to active public life in 2005 when he was elected Sergeant at Arms of the Senate.
