= Pettry, West Virginia =

Unincorporated community in West Virginia, US

Coordinates: 37°26′10″N 80°57′50″W

Pettry is an unincorporated community in Mercer County, in the U.S. state of West Virginia.

== History ==
A post office called Pettry was established in 1907, and remained in operation until 1952. C. W. Pettrey, an early postmaster, gave the community his name.
