= Tate Lohr Wildlife Management Area =

State Wildlife Management Area in Mercer County, West Virginia

- IUCN category V (protected landscape/seascape)
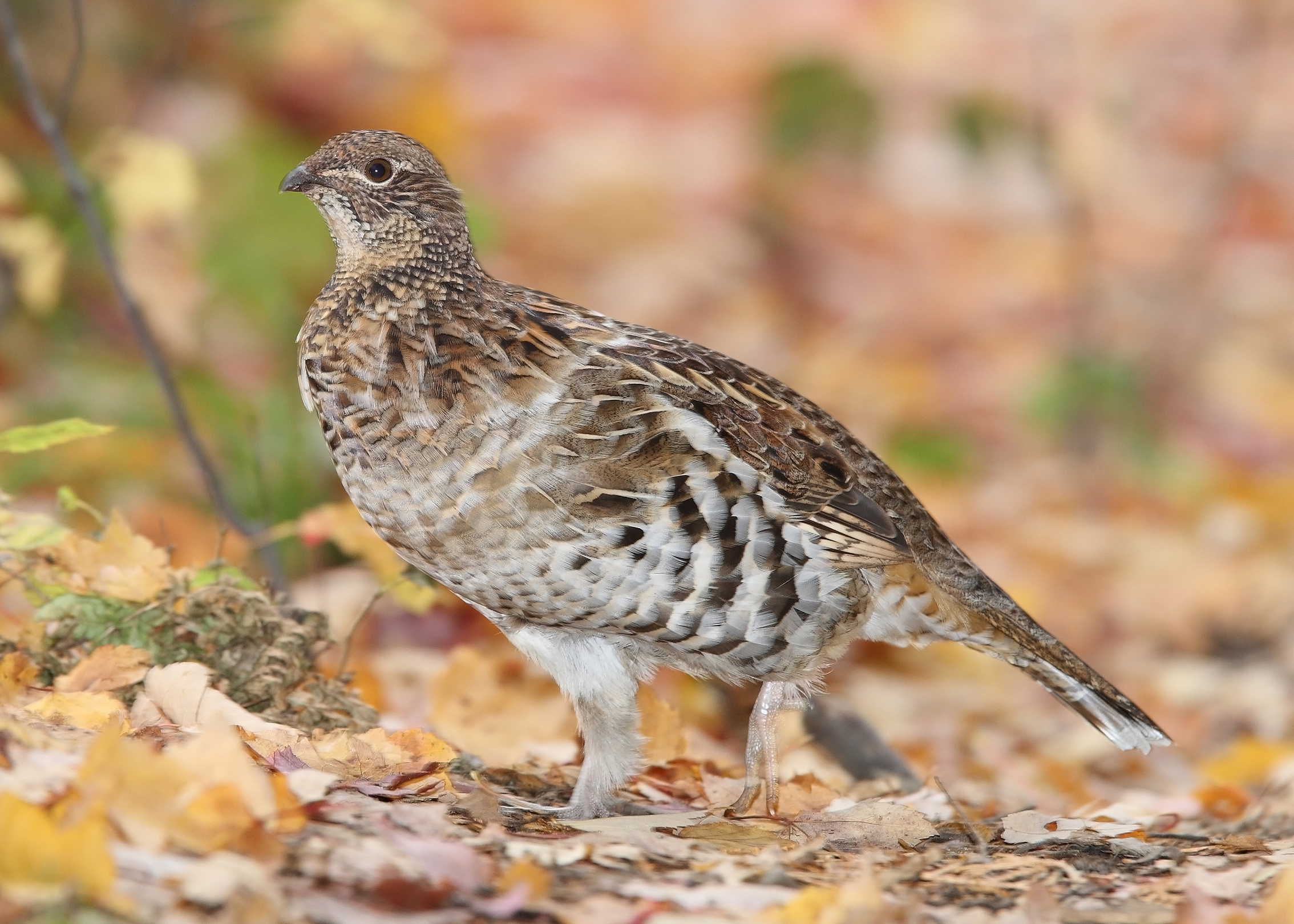
- Ruffed grouse (Bonasa umbellus) may be found at the Tate Lohr WMA

- Location within West Virginia
- Location: Mercer, West Virginia, United States
- Coordinates: 37°18′20″N 80°57′49″W
- Area: 500 acres (200 ha)
- Elevation: 2,380 ft (730 m)
- Operator: Wildlife Resources Section, WV Division of Natural Resources

Tate Lohr Wildlife Management Area, is located in Mercer County near the community of Oakvale, West Virginia. Tate Lohr WMA is located on 500 acres (200 ha) of sloping terrain varying from 2,100 feet (640 m) to 3,500 feet (1,100 m).

The WMA is accessed from Pigeon Creek Road south of Oakvale off U.S. Route 460.

== Hunting ==
Hunting opportunities in Tate Lohr WMA include deer, grouse, raccoon, squirrel, and turkey. Hunting opportunities are limited by the small size of the WMA.

Camping is not allowed in the WMA.

== See also ==
- Animal conservation
- Hunting
- List of West Virginia wildlife management areas
