= Joseph Shrader =

U.S. Marine Corps general

Joseph F. Shrader
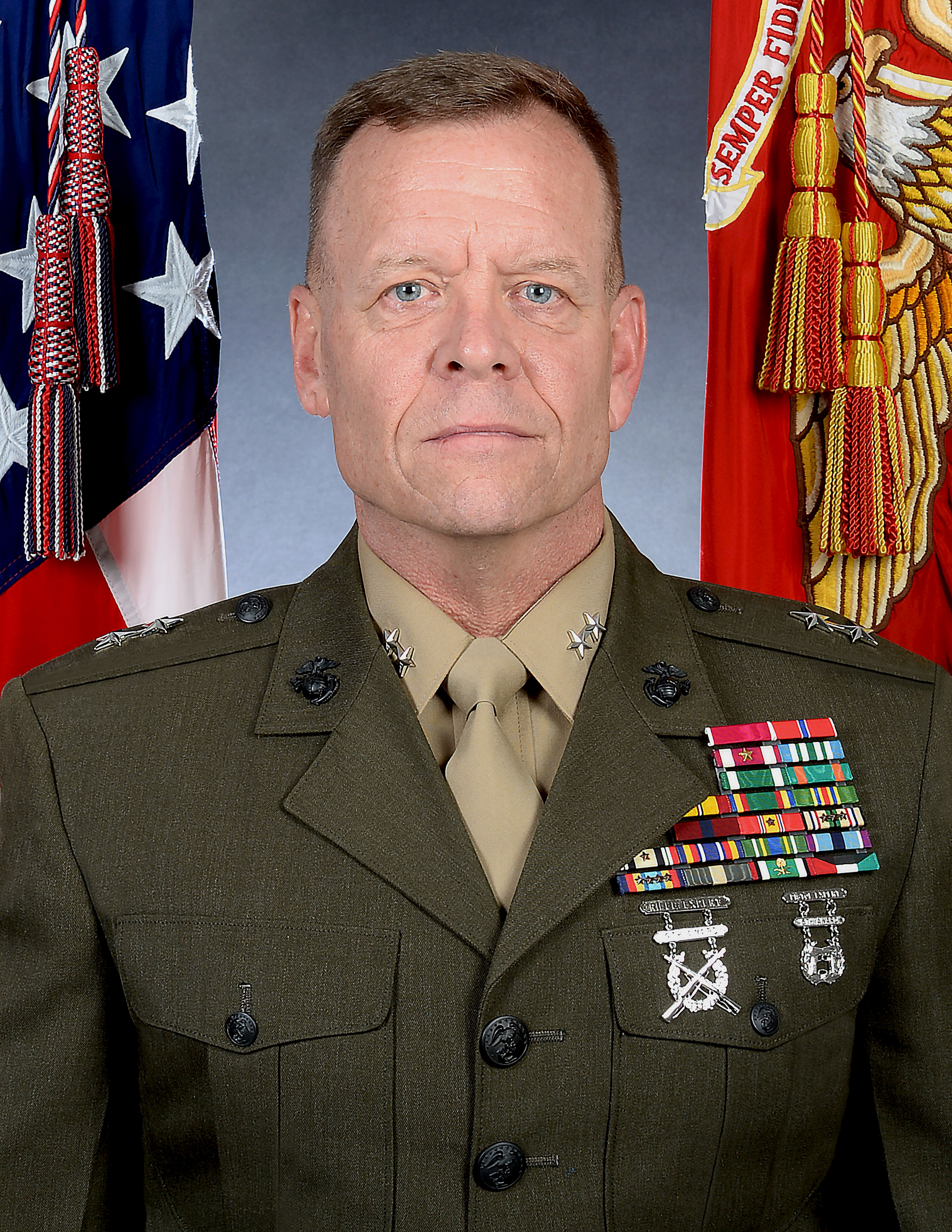
- Official portrait, 2019
- Born: Princeton, West Virginia, U.S.
- Military career
- Allegiance: United States
- Branch: United States Marine Corps
- Service years: 1981–2022
- Rank: Major General
- Commands: Marine Corps Logistics Command; Marine Corps Systems Command; 5th Air Naval Gunfire Liaison Company

Joseph F. Shrader is a retired United States Marine Corps major general who last served as the Commanding General of the Marine Corps Logistics Command from June 14, 2018 to July 18, 2022. Previously, he served as the Commander of the Marine Corps Systems Command from July 11, 2014, to May 22, 2018.

Military offices
Preceded by Francis L. Kelley	Commander of the Marine Corps Systems Command; 2014–2018	Succeeded by Arthur J. Pasagian
Preceded by Craig C. Crenshaw	Commanding General of the Marine Corps Logistics Command; 2018–2022	Succeeded by Keith D. Reventlow
