= Battle of Clark's House =

Battle of the American Civil War

Coordinates: 37°31.785′N 81°6.537′W

The Battle of Clark's House was a Western Virginia military operation in Mercer County on May 1 that was a part of Jackson's 1862 Campaign that was outside of the Shenandoah Valley.
