= Dr. Robert B. McNutt House =

Historic house in West Virginia, United States

- U.S. National Register of Historic Places
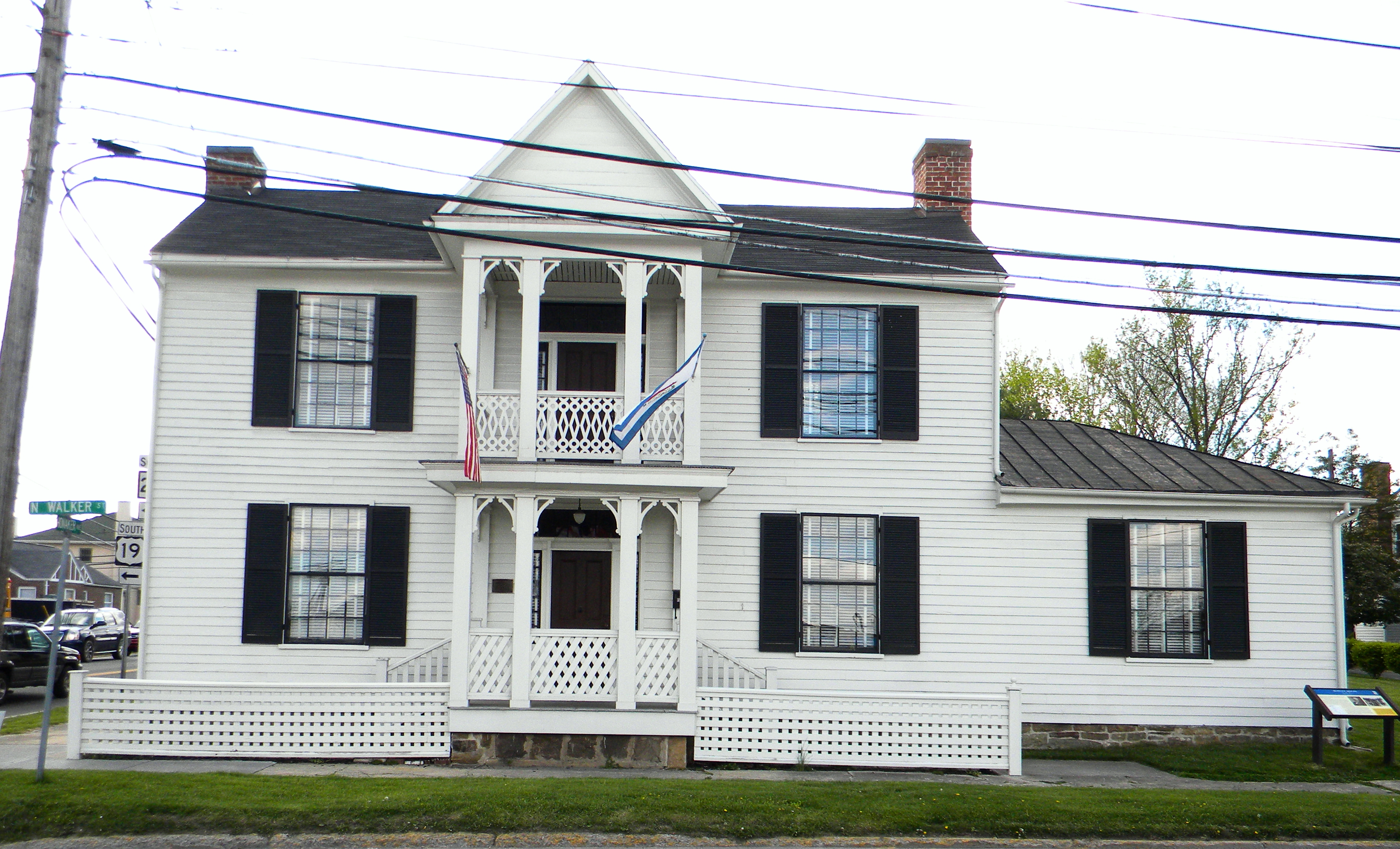

- Location within West Virginia Location within the United States
- Location: 1522 N. Walker St., Princeton, West Virginia
- Coordinates: 37°22′2″N 81°6′10″W
- Area: less than one acre
- Built: c. 1840
- Architectural style: Gothic Revival
- NRHP reference No.: 01000777
- Added to NRHP: July 25, 2001

Dr. Robert B. McNutt House is a historic home located at Princeton, Mercer County, West Virginia, United States. The original section was built about 1840, and is a classic I house configuration, with a two-story, three-bay main facade and a one-bay-wide, two-story centered portico. Later additions include a one-story, hip-roofed section and a two-story ell. The portico has curvilinear brackets and a second story railing in the Gothic Revival style. The house sits on a random ashlar sandstone foundation. Also on the property is a contributing stone storage building / well house. The house was used as a headquarters and field hospital by the Union Army in the spring of 1862.

It was listed on the National Register of Historic Places in 2001.
