= Dr. James W. Hale House =

Historic house in West Virginia, United States

- U.S. National Register of Historic Places
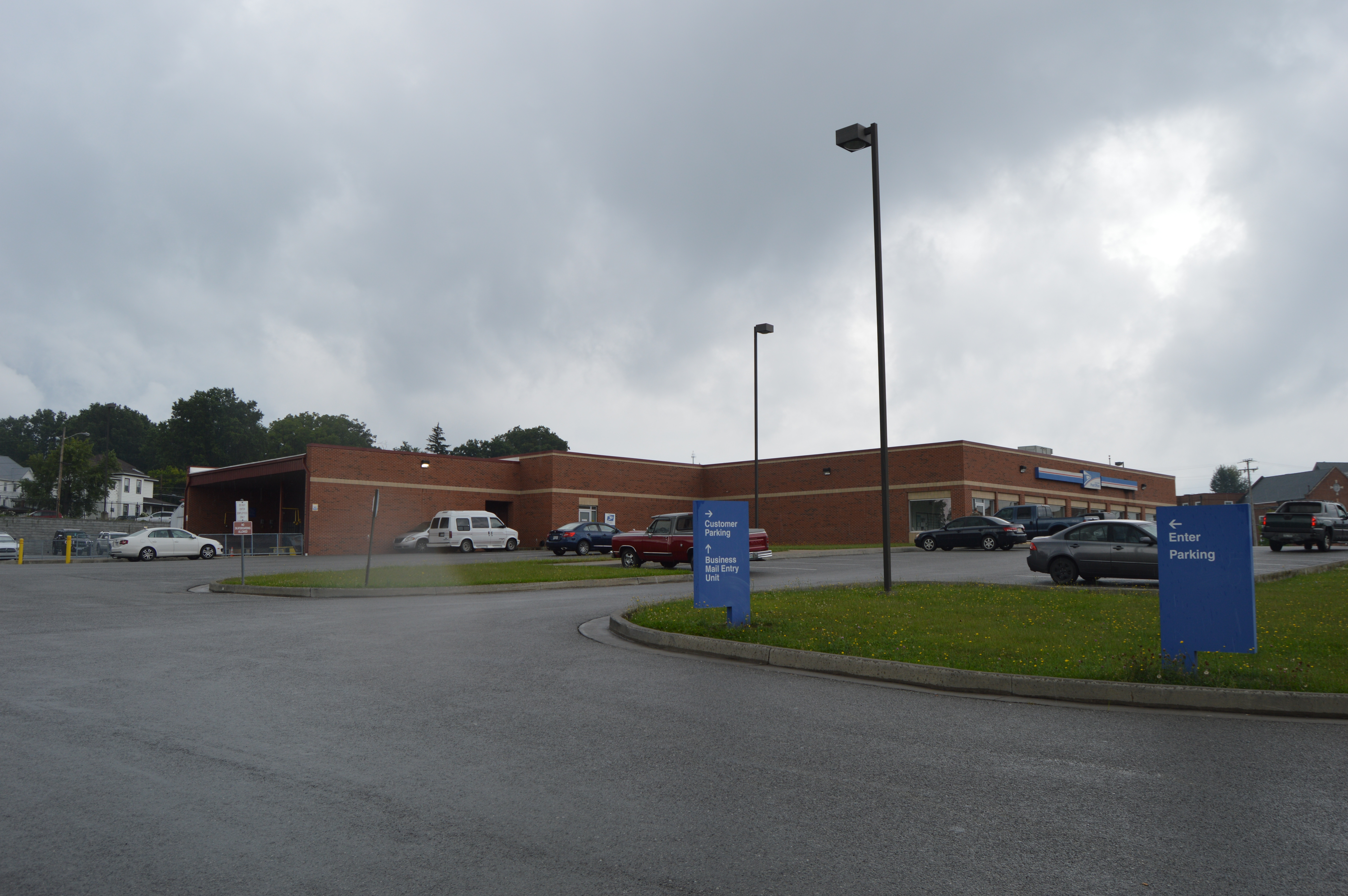
- Site, now occupied by a post office

- Location within West Virginia Location within the United States
- Location: 1034 Mercer St., Princeton, West Virginia
- Coordinates: 37°22′6″N 81°5′54″W
- Area: 1.5 acres (0.61 ha)
- Built: c. 1885
- Architectural style: Greek Revival, Gothic
- NRHP reference No.: 76001941
- Added to NRHP: March 12, 1976

Dr. James W. Hale House, also known as the Hale-Pendleton House, "Temple Knob," and "Temple Hill," was a historic home located at Princeton, Mercer County, West Virginia. Built about 1885, it was a large, two-story plus basement brick house. The house had many Gothic Revival features, such as pointed-arch windows with panes divided by simple geometric tracery, gingerbread bargeboards, and a large verandah completely around the west and south elevations. The verandah roof was supported by more than 12 fluted columns and a cornice with dentil molding in the Greek Revival style. The house sat atop Temple Knob, a small rise said to have been used as a signal point by both Union and Confederate soldiers during the American Civil War.

It was listed on the National Register of Historic Places in 1976.
