= Mercer Street Historic District =

Historic district in West Virginia, United States

- U.S. National Register of Historic Places
- U.S. Historic district
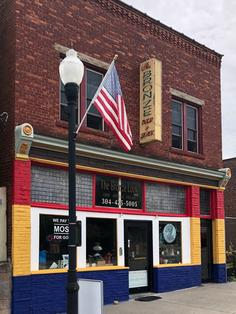
- Contributing Business to the Historic District--The Bronze Look

- Location within West Virginia Location within the United States
- Location: Mercer St. bet. North First St. and North St., Princeton, West Virginia
- Coordinates: 37°22′13″N 81°5′15″W
- Area: 6 acres (2.4 ha)
- Built: 1908
- Architectural style: Late Victorian, Late 19th And Early 20th Century American Movements
- NRHP reference No.: 03001060
- Added to NRHP: October 17, 2003

Mercer Street Historic District is a national historic district located at Princeton, Mercer County, West Virginia. The district includes 28 contributing buildings in the central business district of Princeton. The buildings are primarily two and three-story, masonry commercial buildings with storefronts on the first floor and housing in the upper stories. Almost all of the buildings date from the opening of the Virginian Railway in 1908 and 1909. Notable buildings include the Old Stag Clothing Store, Mercer County Schools Warehouse (c. 1930), Cleaners and Laundry Building (c. 1915), Sively Company Building (1913), Mullins Brothers Building (1912), and D&D Saddle and Tack Building (c. 1915).

It was listed on the National Register of Historic Places in 2003.
