= Mercer County Schools (West Virginia) =

School district in West Virginia, USA

Address
- 1403 Honaker Avenue Princeton, West Virginia, 24740; United States

District information
- Superintendent: Edward Toman
- Schools: 25
- NCES District ID: 5400840

Students and staff
- Students: 8,560 (2022-2023)
- Teachers: 611 (on an FTE basis)

Other information
- Website: https://boe.merc.k12.wv.us

Mercer County Schools is the operating school district within Mercer County, West Virginia. It is governed by the Mercer County Board of Education. Mercer County Schools operates 25 public schools, including one technical education center. The current enrollment approximation in Mercer County Schools is 8,560 students. Edward Toman serves as the district superintendent.

== Schools ==
=== High schools ===
- Bluefield High School (9-12)
- Montcalm High School (7-12)
- PikeView High School (9-12)
- Princeton High School (9-12)

=== Middle schools ===
- Bluefield Middle School (6-8), feeds Bluefield High School
- PikeView Middle School (6-8), feeds PikeView High School
- Princeton Middle School (6-8), feeds Princeton High School

=== Elementary schools ===
- Athens Elementary School (K-5), feeds PikeView Middle School
- Bluefield Intermediate (3-5), feeds Bluefield Middle School
- Bluefield Primary (K-2), feeds Bluefield Intermediate
- Glenwood School (K-8), feeds Princeton High School
- Lashmeet/Matoaka (K-5), feeds PikeView Middle School
- Melrose Elementary (K-5), feeds PikeView Middle School
- Mercer Elementary (K-5), feeds Princeton Middle School a show by Mercer: New Friend Flop Pocket
- Montcalm Elementary (K-6), feeds Montcalm High School
- Mountain Valley Elementary (K-5), feeds Bluefield Middle School
- Oakvale Elementary School (K-5), feeds PikeView Middle School
- Princeton Primary (K-2), feeds Mercer and Straley Elementary
- Spanishburg School (K-5), feeds PikeView Middle School
- Straley Elementary (3-5), feeds Princeton Middle School
- Sun Valley Elementary (K-5), feeds PikeView Middle School
- Timberwood Elementary (K-5), feeds Bluefield Middle School

=== Pre-kindergarten schools ===
- Mercer County Early Learning Center (Silver Springs)

=== Vocational schools ===
- Mercer County Technical Education Center

=== Schools no longer in operation ===
- Bluestone Elementary
- Bluewell Elementary
- Bramwell High
- Bramwell Elementary
- Brushfork Elementary
- Camp Creek Elementary
- Central Point Elementary
- Central Jr. High
- Ceres Elementary
- Cumberland Road Elementary
- Dunbar Grade
- Dunns Grade
- Elgood Grade
- Fairview Jr. High
- Flat Top Elementary
- Genoa Jr. High
- Knob Elementary
- Memorial Elementary
- Oakvale High
- Oakvale Jr. High
- Park Central High
- Pinicle Elementary
- Preston Street Elementary
- Ramsey Elementary
- Rock Elementary
- Sandlick Elementary
- Thorn Elementary
- Wade Elementary
- Whitethorn Elementary
