= Montcalm, West Virginia =

- Census-designated place (CDP)
- Location in Mercer County and the state of West Virginia.
- Coordinates: 37°21′03″N 81°14′48″W
- Country: United States
- State: West Virginia
- County: Mercer

Area
  - Total: 2.7 sq mi (7.1 km^{2})
  - Land: 2.7 sq mi (7.1 km^{2})
  - Water: 0 sq mi (0.0 km^{2})
- Elevation: 2,274 ft (693 m)

Population (2020)
  - Total: 575
  - Density: 210/sq mi (81/km^{2})
- Time zone: UTC-5 (Eastern (EST))
  - Summer (DST): UTC-4 (EDT)
- ZIP code: 24737
- Area code: 304
- FIPS code: 54-55372
- GNIS feature ID: 2389496

Montcalm is a census-designated place (CDP) in Mercer County, West Virginia, United States. The population was 575 at the 2020 census, down from 726 at the 2010 census. It is part of the Bluefield, WV-VA micropolitan area which has a population of 107,342. Residents of Montcalm are called Montcalmers.

== History ==
The first record of continuous European settlement of the Montcalm area is the 1840 census of Mercer County in what was then the state of Virginia. A 700-acre farm, located where Crane Creek joins the Bluestone, was the property of George Bailey. He, his wife, and six children lived on the farm that included a farmhouse, likely located on the lower slopes of Tabernacle Mountain, an orchard and in what would be today's Main Street, and a field of timothy grass. About one hundred acres of corn field could be found at the top of a mountain on "the opposite side of the river" (either Methodist Church Hill or Browning Lambert Mountain). The farm also featured a small dam on the Crane Creek that powered a corn grist mill, the only one in the area and the farm's most valuable property.

The Bailey family occupied this farm until 1852 when, in preparation for a move to the West, they sold their considerable estate and all of what would one day be the village of Montcalm for $1,500 to Robert Williams, a recently arrived retired sailor from the British Navy.

Williams wrote and published his experiences in Mercer County and in the events that led up to the Civil War in Kansas in a memoir published in 1908 titled With the Border Ruffians, which is the earliest narrative of life in Montcalm's Bluestone Valley.

Williams wrote about meeting the leaders of the early Mercer County communities, a court day in Princeton, a church camp meeting in what would one day be Glenwood Park, hunting in the hills around the Bluestone, community dances and several threats to his life while homesteading on the former Bailey Farm.

After several legal disputes in which he was largely not at fault, Williams sold the farm for $2,000 to the Herndon family, a slave-holding clan who owned a neighboring farm. According to West Virginia historian Kyle McCormick, descendants of the family lived in Montcalm a century later.

According to local tradition, the name of the town that grew up around the former Bailey Farm was first identified as "Riverside". As it grew with the coming of first local coal mines and then railway lines, it was decided to place a local post office in the town circa 1910. It was then discovered that there was already a town in the state having a post office with the Riverside name and it was necessary to choose a new name. Undocumented tradition states that a group of local schoolchildren, when asked to help select a new town name, selected "Montcalm" as they had just completed their study of the French and Indian War, wherein Louis-Joseph de Montcalm had been the commander of the French forces in North America, and they liked the name.

In 1924 an enormous rainstorm resulted in the collapse of the mountainside along Crane Creek, causing a flash flood to inundate Montcalm and its neighboring town of McComas. An explosion of a mining ash and debris dump was touched off by the storm and began a mudslide that covered the train track in fifteen feet of mud and debris. Eight people were killed in what became known as the Catastrophe of Crane Creek.

At some point in the 19th century the first formal school in the Montcalm area, known as the Mullins School, was established on Browning Lambert Mountain.

Montcalm High School was founded as a junior high in 1931 and converted to a senior high in the 1950s. A new Montcalm High School was completed in 1983.

== Notable people ==
- Hazel Dickens, American bluegrass singer, songwriter, double bassist and guitarist, member of the West Virginia Music Hall of Fame
- Howard Wellman, West Virginia politician and graduate of Montcalm High School

== Geography ==
Montcalm is located along the Bluestone River. The Bluestone River has been identified as having significant PCB contamination and high levels of fecal coliform bacteria.

According to the United States Census Bureau, the CDP has a total area of 2.7 square miles (7.1 km^{2}), all land.

=== Climate ===
The climate in this area has mild differences between highs and lows, and there is adequate rainfall year-round. According to the Köppen Climate Classification system, Montcalm has a marine west coast climate, abbreviated "Cfb" on climate maps.

== Demographics ==
As of the census of 2000, there were 885 people, 344 households, and 256 families residing in the CDP. The population density was 321.4 people per square mile (124.3/km^{2}). There were 384 housing units at an average density of 139.4/sq mi (53.9/km^{2}). The racial makeup of the CDP was 97.74% White, 0.56% African American, 0.79% Native American, 0.11% from other races, and 0.79% from two or more races. Hispanic or Latino of any race were 1.81% of the population.

There were 344 households, out of which 30.2% had children under the age of 18 living with them, 56.1% were married couples living together, 13.1% had a female householder with no husband present, and 25.3% were non-families. 22.1% of all households were made up of individuals, and 10.2% had someone living alone who was 65 years of age or older. The average household size was 2.57 and the average family size was 2.99.

In the CDP, the population was spread out, with 23.8% under the age of 18, 9.9% from 18 to 24, 27.3% from 25 to 44, 25.9% from 45 to 64, and 13.0% who were 65 years of age or older. The median age was 37 years. For every 100 females, there were 95.8 males. For every 100 females age 18 and over, there were 89.3 males.

The median income for a household in the CDP was $20,435, and the median income for a family was $21,630. Males had a median income of $28,750 versus $13,750 for females. The per capita income for the CDP was $9,671. About 19.3% of families and 24.3% of the population were below the poverty line, including 35.1% of those under age 18 and 12.0% of those age 65 or over.
