= Oakvale, West Virginia =

- Town
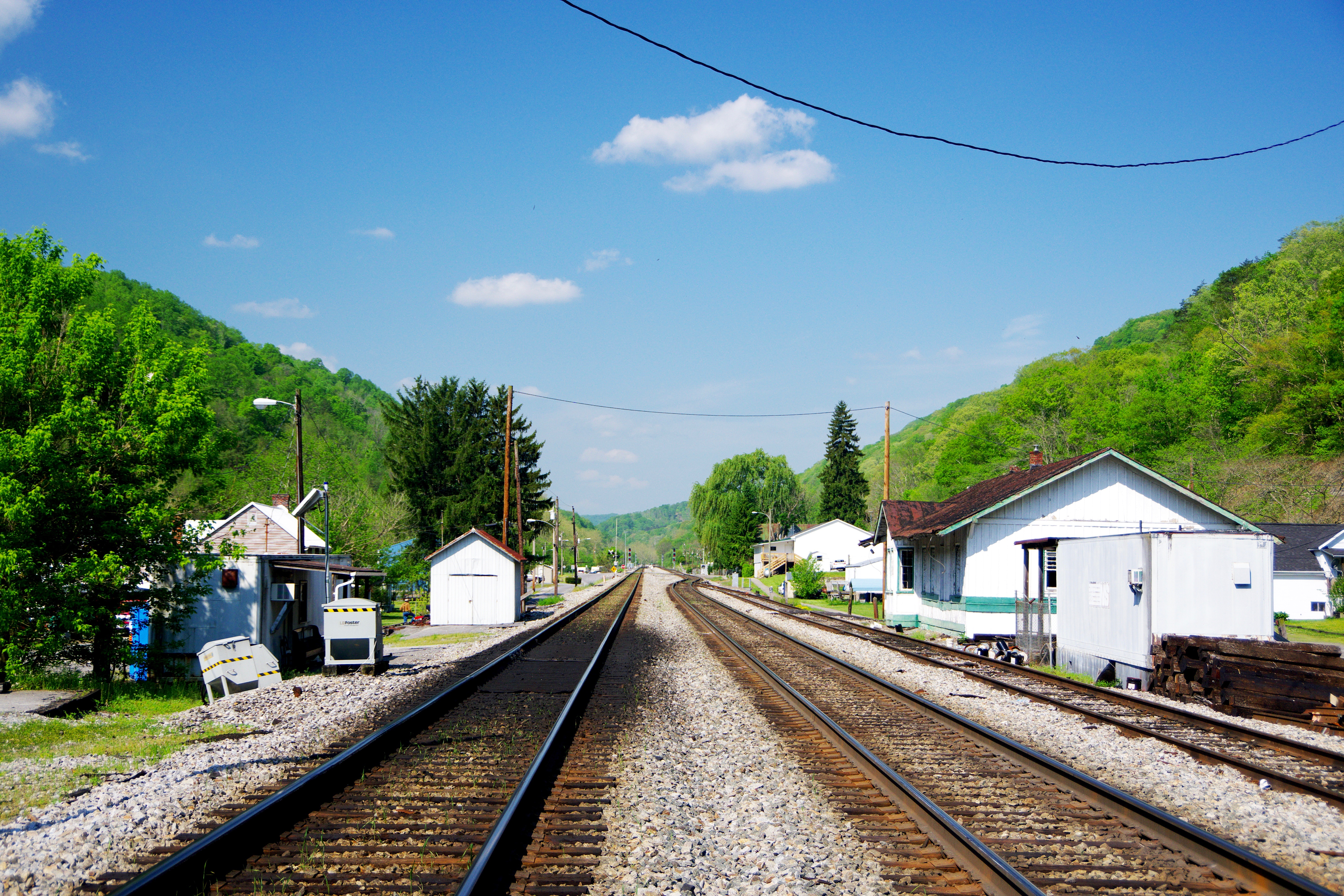
- View along the railroad tracks in Oakvale

- Location of Oakvale in Mercer County, West Virginia.
- Coordinates: 37°19′56″N 80°58′13″W
- Country: United States
- State: West Virginia
- County: Mercer

Area
  - Total: 0.42 sq mi (1.09 km^{2})
  - Land: 0.42 sq mi (1.08 km^{2})
  - Water: 0.0039 sq mi (0.01 km^{2})
- Elevation: 1,732 ft (528 m)

Population (2020)
  - Total: 133
  - Estimate (2021): 136
  - Density: 268/sq mi (103.5/km^{2})
- Time zone: UTC-5 (Eastern (EST))
  - Summer (DST): UTC-4 (EDT)
- ZIP code: 24739
- Area code: 304
- FIPS code: 54-60196
- GNIS feature ID: 2391339
- Website: local.wv.gov/oakvale/Pages/default.aspx

Oakvale is a town in Mercer County, West Virginia, United States, along the East River. The population was 137 at the 2020 census. It is part of the Bluefield, WV-VA micropolitan area which has a population of 107,578.

== History ==
Oakvale was originally known as "Frenchville" after an early settler, Captain Napoleon French. It was renamed Oakvale after the dense stands of oak trees that grew in the valley. The town incorporated in 1907.

== Geography ==
The town is situated in a narrow valley along the East River, a few miles west of the state line between Virginia and West Virginia. West Virginia Route 112 (Ingleside Road) traverses Oakvale, connecting the town with Bluefield to the southwest. U.S. Route 460 passes just north of the town.

According to the United States Census Bureau, the town has a total area of 0.42 square miles (1.09 km^{2}), all land.

== Demographics ==
Historical population
Census	Pop.	Note	%±
1910	278		—
1920	281		1.1%
1930	261		−7.1%
1940	273		4.6%
1950	239		−12.5%
1960	267		11.7%
1970	292		9.4%
1980	208		−28.8%
1990	165		−20.7%
2000	142		−13.9%
2010	121		−14.8%
2020	133		9.9%
2021 (est.)	136	▲	2.3%
U.S. Decennial Census

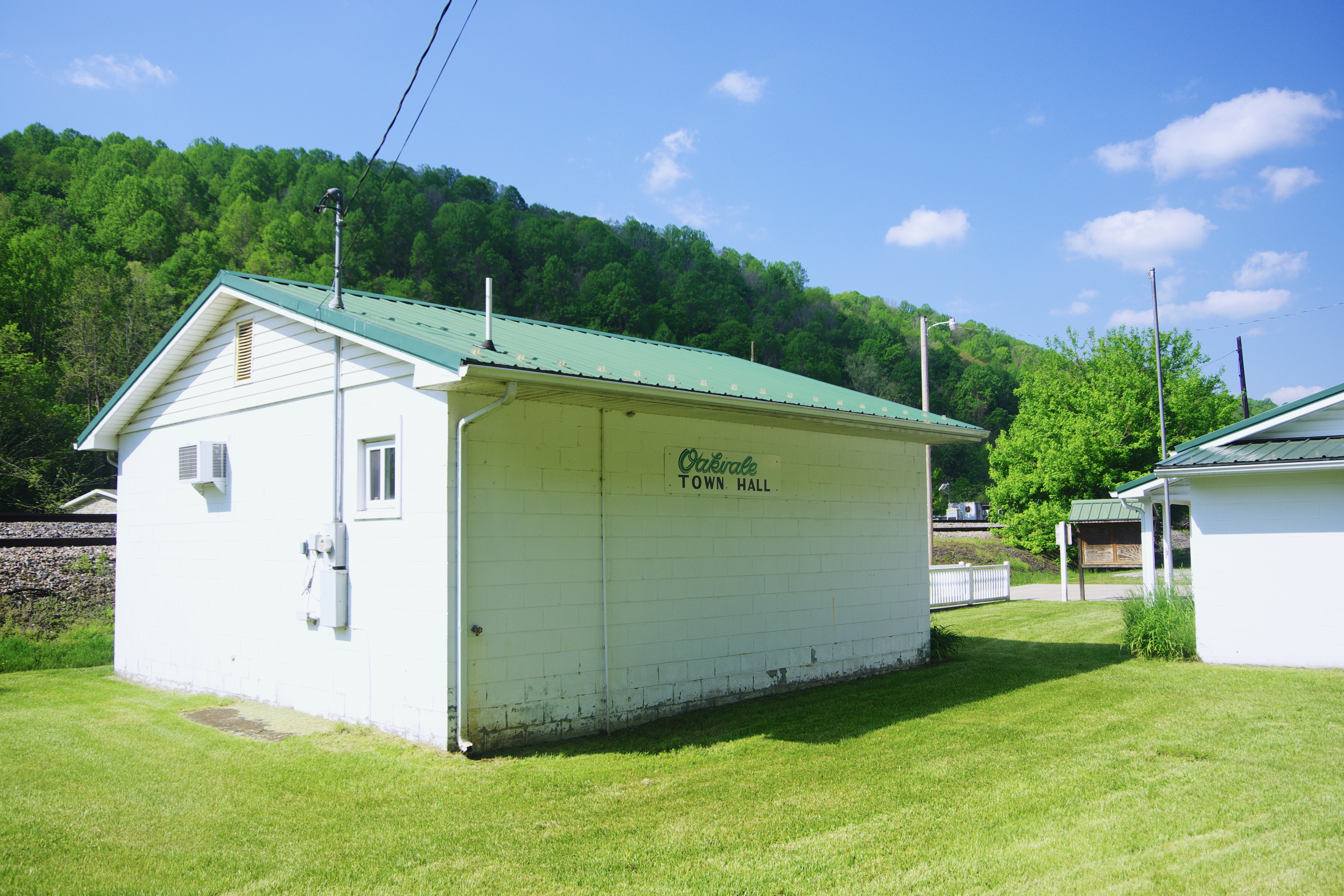
Oakvale Town Hall

=== 2010 census ===
At the 2010 census there were 121 people, 49 households, and 31 families living in the town. The population density was 288.1 inhabitants per square mile (111.2/km^{2}). There were 55 housing units at an average density of 131.0 per square mile (50.6/km^{2}). The racial makeup of the town was 100.0% White. Of the 49 households 28.6% had children under the age of 18 living with them, 42.9% were married couples living together, 12.2% had a female householder with no husband present, 8.2% had a male householder with no wife present, and 36.7% were non-families. 22.4% of households were one person and 10.2% were one person aged 65 or older. The average household size was 2.47 and the average family size was 2.94.

The median age in the town was 41.9 years. 24% of residents were under the age of 18; 4.9% were between the ages of 18 and 24; 27.3% were from 25 to 44; 27.3% were from 45 to 64; and 16.5% were 65 or older. The gender makeup of the town was 52.1% male and 47.9% female.

=== 2000 census ===
At the 2000 census there were 142 people, 58 households, and 45 families living in the town. The population density was 332.2 inhabitants per square mile (127.5/km^{2}). There were 65 housing units at an average density of 152.0 per square mile (58.4/km^{2}). The racial makeup of the town was 97.89% White, 1.41% African American, and 0.70% from two or more races. Of the 58 households 29.3% had children under the age of 18 living with them, 48.3% were married couples living together, 20.7% had a female householder with no husband present, and 22.4% were non-families. 20.7% of households were one person and 12.1% were one person aged 65 or older. The average household size was 2.45 and the average family size was 2.73.

The age distribution was 23.2% under the age of 18, 10.6% from 18 to 24, 28.9% from 25 to 44, 25.4% from 45 to 64, and 12.0% 65 or older. The median age was 37 years. For every 100 females, there were 91.9 males. For every 100 females age 18 and over, there were 91.2 males.

The median household income was $22,500 and the median family income was $23,750. Males had a median income of $24,375 versus $22,500 for females. The per capita income for the town was $9,593. There were 9.5% of families and 19.0% of the population living below the poverty line, including 16.0% of under eighteens and 25.0% of those over 64.

== See also ==
- Tate Lohr Wildlife Management Area
