= Montcalm High School =

Location
- 37°20′46.4″N 81°15′19.6″W

Information
- Established: 1931
- School district: Mercer County Schools
- Faculty: 19.00 (FTE)
- Grades: 7-12
- Student to teacher ratio: 14.84
- Colors: White and blue
- Mascot: General
- Website: https://www.boe.merc.k12.wv.us/o/mhs

Montcalm High School, a "school within a school", is located in Montcalm, West Virginia, United States. It is the smallest secondary school in the Mercer County Schools district, and currently has approximately 375 students enrolled in grades 7-12.

== History ==
MHS began in 1931, housing grades 7–10. 11th and 12th grade students went on to Bramwell High School. In 1954, a west wing was added to accommodate much needed classrooms, which allowed students to graduate from this school for the first time. In 1964, a gymnasium was built. Due to lack of room, students had to use the elementary school next door to have lunch. In the late 1970s, a new elementary school was constructed, and students were then bused to the new elementary school. In 1983, a new school was completed, complete with a gym, commons area known as the lunch room, and a band section. In 1991, Bramwell High School was closed, and was consolidated with Montcalm High School.
