= Bluewell, West Virginia =

- Census-designated place
- Location in Mercer County and the state of West Virginia.
- Coordinates: 37°18′45″N 81°15′05″W
- Country: United States
- State: West Virginia
- County: Mercer

Area
  - Total: 4.521911 sq mi (11.711697 km^{2})
  - Land: 4.493871 sq mi (11.639073 km^{2})
  - Water: 0.028040 sq mi (0.072624 km^{2})
- Elevation: 2,631 ft (802 m)

Population (2020)
  - Total: 2,162
  - Density: 481.1/sq mi (185.8/km^{2})
- Time zone: UTC-5 (Eastern (EST))
  - Summer (DST): UTC-4 (EDT)
- ZIP code: 24701
- Area codes: 304, 681
- GNIS feature ID: 2585054

Bluewell, West Virginia is an unincorporated census-designated place on U.S. Route 52 in Mercer County, West Virginia, United States. As of the 2020 census, its population is 2,162 (slightly down from 2,184 at the 2010 census). It is the terminus of West Virginia Route 20.

The community has no post office, its residences being a part of Bluefield for postal purposes. Its name is derived from being halfway between Bluefield and Bramwell.

The community is adjacent to Pinnacle Rock State Park. It has become an active spot for Pocahontas Trail ATV riders of the Hatfield-Mcoy Trail system with many business catering to them.

== Educational institutions ==
- Bluewell Elementary

== See also ==
- Southern West Virginia
