= Matoaka, West Virginia =

- Census-designated place
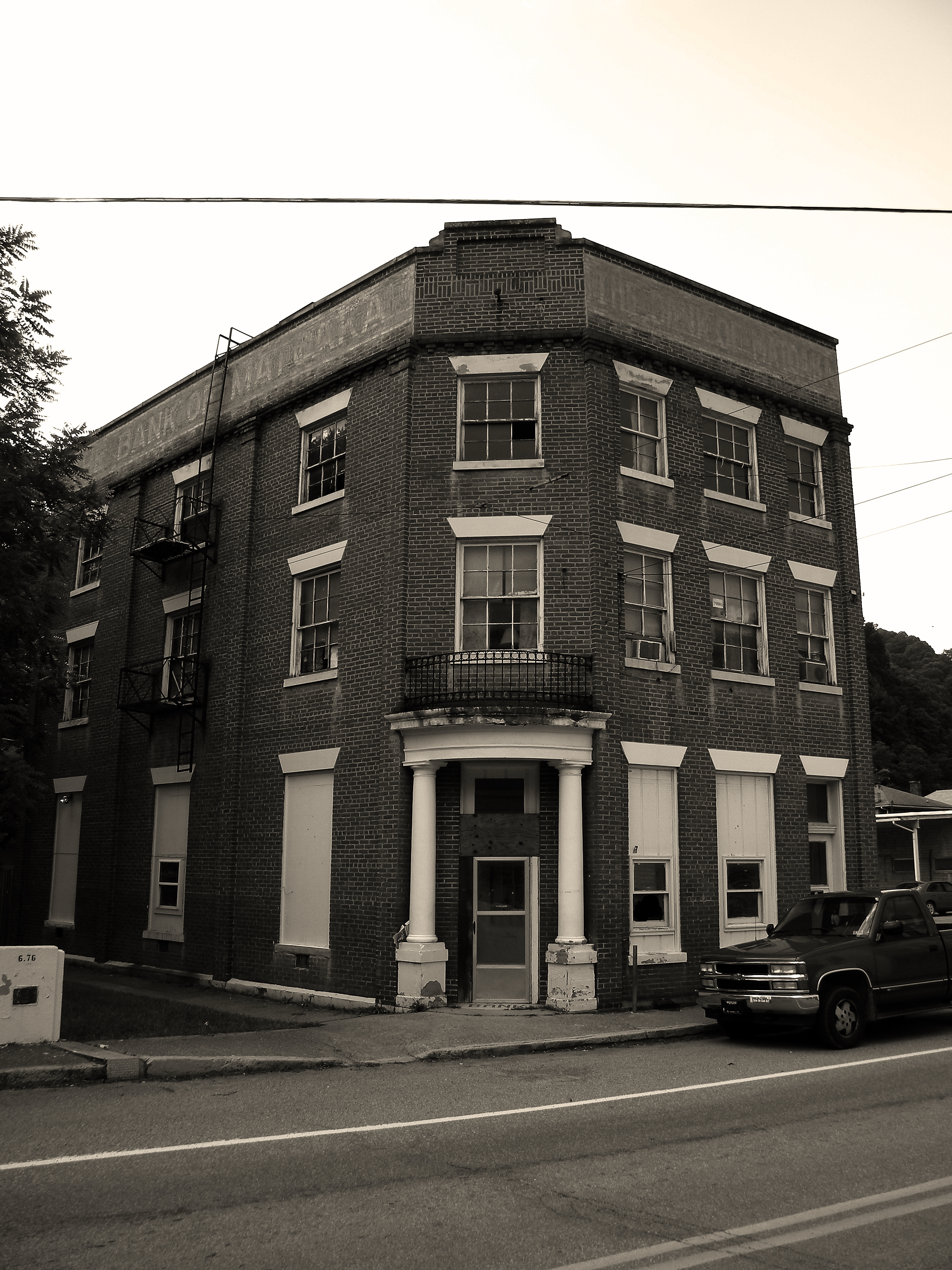
- Bank of Matoaka West Virginia

- Location of Matoaka in Mercer County, West Virginia.
- Coordinates: 37°25′12″N 81°14′35″W
- Country: United States
- State: West Virginia
- County: Mercer
- Incorporated: 1910

Area
  - Total: 0.26 sq mi (0.68 km^{2})
  - Land: 0.26 sq mi (0.68 km^{2})
  - Water: 0 sq mi (0.00 km^{2})
- Elevation: 2,359 ft (719 m)

Population (2020)
  - Total: 173
  - Density: 655.3/sq mi (253.0/km^{2})
- Time zone: UTC-5 (Eastern (EST))
  - Summer (DST): UTC-4 (EDT)
- ZIP code: 24736
- Area code: 304
- FIPS code: 54-52420
- GNIS feature ID: 1542868

Matoaka is a census-designated place in Mercer County, West Virginia, United States. The population was 173 at the 2020 census. It is part of the Bluefield, WV-VA micropolitan area which has a population of 100,093. This town is named for Chief Powhatan's daughter Matoaka who was better known by her nickname "Pocahontas". Matoaka became an unincorporated town when it voted to dissolve its charter in May 2018.

== History ==
In 2014, a fire in downtown Matoaka caused an estimated four million dollars in damage and destroyed five buildings.

In May 2018, the town voted to dissolve its charter and begin the process of unincorporating.

== Geography ==
According to the United States Census Bureau, the town has a total area of 0.26 square miles (0.67 km^{2}), all land.

=== Climate ===
The climate in this area has mild differences between highs and lows, and there is adequate rainfall year-round. According to the Köppen Climate Classification system, Matoaka has a marine west coast climate, abbreviated "Cfb" on climate maps.

== Demographics ==
Historical population
Census	Pop.	Note	%±
1920	647		—
1930	929		43.6%
1940	926		−0.3%
1950	1,003		8.3%
1960	613		−38.9%
1970	608		−0.8%
1980	613		0.8%
1990	366		−40.3%
2000	317		−13.4%
2010	227		−28.4%
2020	173		−23.8%
U.S. Decennial Census

The United States Census Bureau redefined Matoaka as a census designated place in the 2023 American Community Survey.

=== 2010 census ===
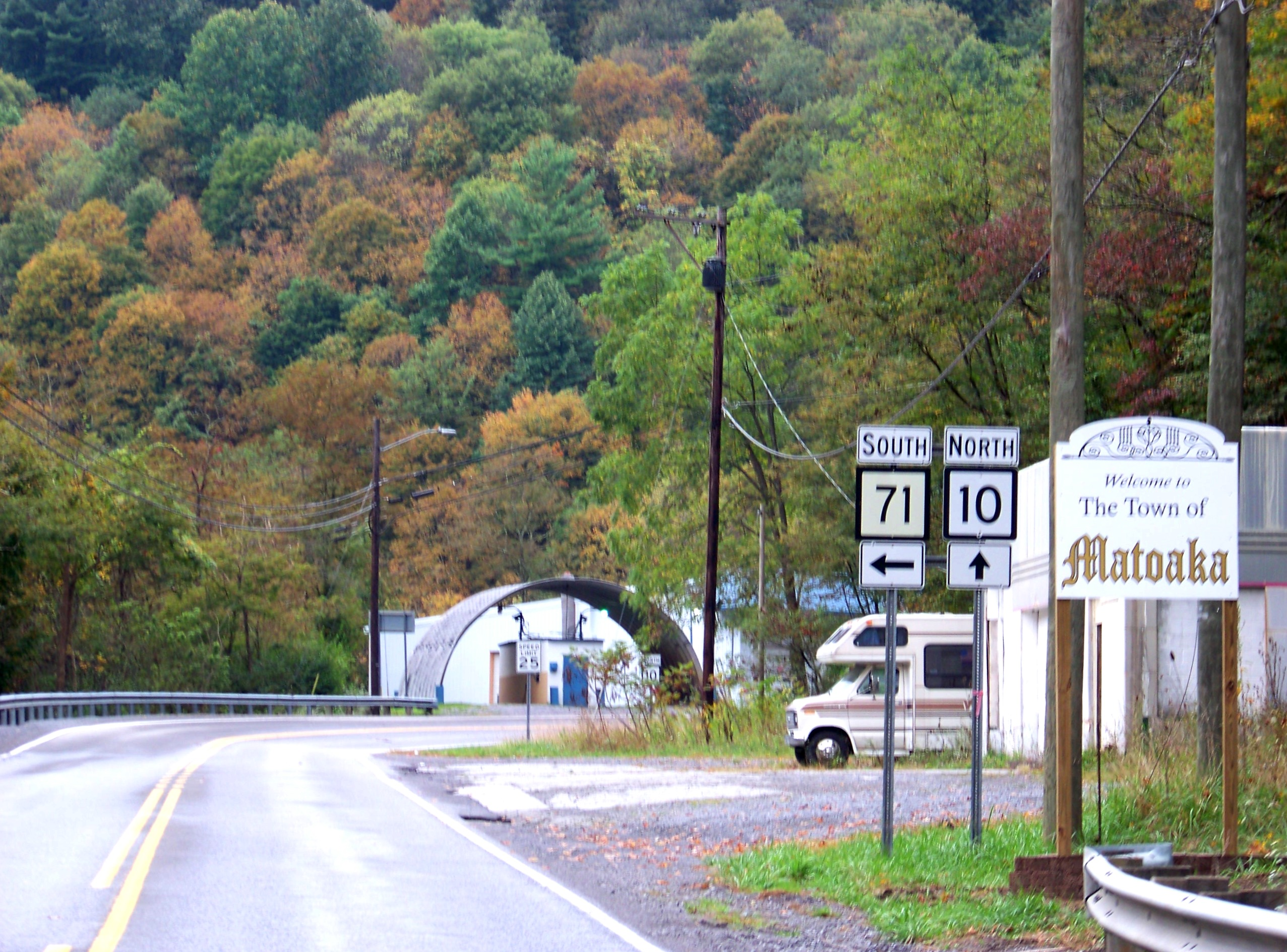
Welcome sign at the entrance of town

At the 2010 census there were 227 people, 87 households, and 60 families living in the town. The population density was 873.1 inhabitants per square mile (337.1/km^{2}). There were 145 housing units at an average density of 557.7 per square mile (215.3/km^{2}). The racial makeup of the town was 98.7% White, 0.4% African American, and 0.9% Asian. Of the 87 households 35.6% had children under the age of 18 living with them, 55.2% were married couples living together, 8.0% had a female householder with no husband present, 5.7% had a male householder with no wife present, and 31.0% were non-families. 24.1% of households were one person and 12.6% were one person aged 65 or older. The average household size was 2.61 and the average family size was 3.12.

The median age in the town was 40.2 years. 26.4% of residents were under the age of 18; 7% were between the ages of 18 and 24; 22.5% were from 25 to 44; 25% were from 45 to 64; and 18.9% were 65 or older. The gender makeup of the town was 50.2% male and 49.8% female.

=== 2000 census ===
At the 2000 census there were 317 people, 125 households, and 93 families living in the town. The population density was 1,181.9 inhabitants per square mile (453.3/km^{2}). There were 155 housing units at an average density of 577.9 per square mile (221.7/km^{2}). The racial makeup of the town was 98.74% White, 0.32% Asian, and 0.95% from two or more races. Of the 125 households 30.4% had children under the age of 18 living with them, 48.0% were married couples living together, 20.0% had a female householder with no husband present, and 25.6% were non-families. 23.2% of households were one person and 16.8% were one person aged 65 or older. The average household size was 2.49 and the average family size was 2.89.

The age distribution was 26.8% under the age of 18, 5.4% from 18 to 24, 26.2% from 25 to 44, 21.8% from 45 to 64, and 19.9% 65 or older. The median age was 36 years. For every 100 females, there were 77.1 males. For every 100 females age 18 and over, there were 82.7 males.

The median household income was $17,159 and the median family income was $19,792. Males had a median income of $25,000 versus $13,750 for females. The per capita income for the town was $9,522. About 28.0% of families and 29.5% of the population were below the poverty line, including 43.9% of those under age 18 and 14.9% of those age 65 or over.
