= Princeton, West Virginia =

- City
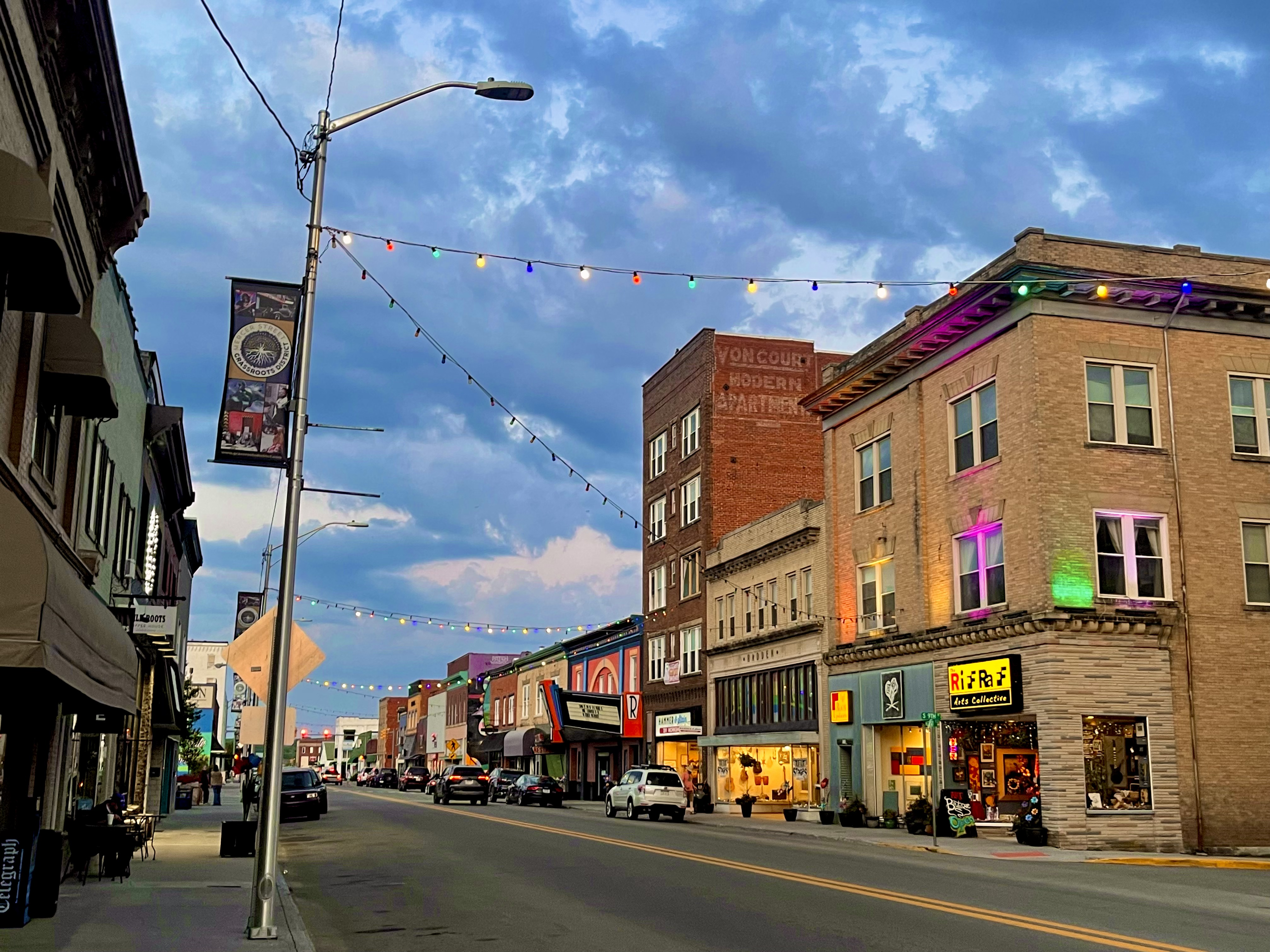
- Downtown Princeton

- Seal
- Nickname: The Heart of Mercer County
- Interactive map of Princeton, West Virginia
- Location within West Virginia Location within the United States
- Coordinates: 37°22′20″N 81°05′32″W
- Country: United States
- State: West Virginia
- County: Mercer
- Incorporated: 1909

Area
  - Total: 3.05 sq mi (7.91 km^{2})
  - Land: 3.02 sq mi (7.81 km^{2})
  - Water: 0.039 sq mi (0.10 km^{2})
- Elevation: 2,431 ft (741 m)

Population (2020)
  - Total: 5,872
  - Density: 1,950/sq mi (752/km^{2})
- Time zone: UTC-5 (Eastern (EST))
  - Summer (DST): UTC-4 (EDT)
- ZIP codes: 24739 & 24740
- Area code: 304
- FIPS code: 54-65692
- GNIS feature ID: 2390640
- Website: www.cityofprinceton.org

Princeton is a city in Mercer County, West Virginia, United States, and its county seat. The population was 5,872 at the 2020 census. It is part of the Bluefield micropolitan area.

== History ==
=== Early history ===
Princeton was named after the Battle of Princeton in Princeton, New Jersey, where General Hugh Mercer, the namesake of Mercer County, had died. When the county was formed in 1837, William Smith donated 1.5 acres of land for the county courthouse in what would become Princeton. Princeton was incorporated on February 20, 1909.

Although Princeton did not see any major battles on its soil, there was the Battle of Pigeon Roost, or the Battle of Princeton Courthouse on May 17, 1862, a victory for the Confederates defending the Dublin railroad.

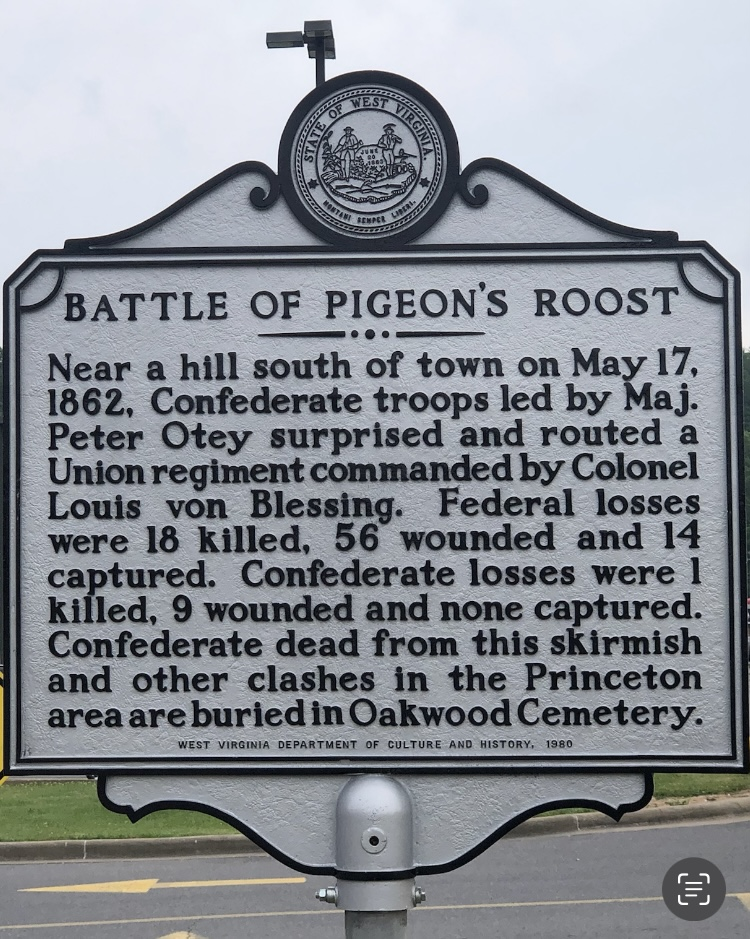
Battle of Pigeon's Roost roadside marker

Princeton had been burned a couple of weeks earlier on May 1 under the command of Captain Walter Jenifer, CSA to prevent the Union army from acquiring their supplies. The town was not burned in retaliation or anger toward the residents of Princeton. According to local history, many of the residents of Princeton torched their own homes and moved on from the area. Few structures would remain after the fire. The Robert McNutt house is the only structure that remains in Princeton which, ironically, served as headquarters for the Union army at one time. Princeton and Mercer County would remain supportive of the Confederacy, and was not included in the original counties that made up the new State of Kanawha, ultimately named West Virginia.

By the end of 1865 Judge Nathaniel Harrison was appointed as circuit judge, and Princeton residents shunned him because he was a Confederate turncoat. Princeton slowly rebuilt during Reconstruction, but the railroad would eventually bring significant growth to Princeton.

=== Growth of coal industry ===
In Southern West Virginia, in the late 19th century, coal mining and transportation by the emerging technology of the railroads combined to form a new industry. Much of the region's bituminous coal was sent northwest to the Great Lakes, or northeast to the Baltimore and Ohio Railroad's coal piers at Baltimore, or to the world's greatest ice-free port of Hampton Roads in eastern Virginia.

Princeton's location was east of the primary coalfields, and most of the coal mining and railroad activity was initially elsewhere. However, a combination of factors would soon change that, and have profound financial and developmental impact on Princeton.

=== Railway development ===
In 1896, engineer William Nelson Page developed the Loup Creek and Deepwater Railway, a logging railroad connecting a small sawmill on the old Loup Creek Estate at Robson with the C&O railroad's main line at Deepwater on the Kanawha River. In 1898, it was rechartered as the Deepwater Railway, with modest plans to extend to nearby coal mines at Glen Jean. Around 1903, the new town of Page became the location of one of the earliest stations on the expanding Deepwater Railway, as well as home of the Page Coal and Coke Company.

In 1902, William Page enlisted the support of millionaire industrialist Henry H. Rogers as a silent partner to finance the expansion of the Deepwater Railway much further, about 80 miles through Mullens to reach a N&W railroad branch line at Matoaka to open up new territory with untapped deposits of high volatile bituminous coal. Page, Rogers, and other wealthy investors owned much of this land.

However, as construction of the expanded Deepwater Railway line got underway, Page found he was unsuccessful in negotiating fair rates to interchange traffic with either major railroad, nor in interesting them in buying his short line railroad. This was later revealed to be caused by collusion by the leaders of the big railroads, notably Alexander Cassatt, William Kissam Vanderbilt, and Frederick J. Kimball, who sought to control shipping rates and coal prices, and prevent any newcomers from entry. They assumed that any entrepreneurs of modest means, such as William Page appeared to be, would become discouraged and give up. In their experience, building costly enterprises such as railroads customarily meant raising large sums of money through public stock offerings and bonds.

As construction on the Deepwater Railway continued, William Page's continued efforts to establish reasonable joint rates with the big railroads continued to prove fruitless. To the puzzlement of the leaders of the big railroads, who were unaware of Rogers' financial backing, Page (and Rogers) did not give up. Instead, they quietly expanded their plans again to build to the Virginia state line. This expansion brought right-of-way for the planned Deepwater Railway through Mercer County and Princeton.

==== Tidewater Railway ====
In Virginia, Page (and Rogers) formed another intrastate railroad, the new Tidewater Railway, which was legally based in Staunton, a city located along the Chesapeake and Ohio Railway (C&O). Notwithstanding its corporate location on the C&O, agents for the new Tidewater Railway quietly surveyed and secured rights-of-way many miles away from the C&O across southern Virginia, roughly paralleling the Norfolk and Western Railway (N&W). With the help of Rogers' fortune, they were successful, even in the City of Roanoke, where the N&W had its corporate headquarters and major shops.

From Roanoke, the new line ran almost due east, missing major cities and towns, to reach Suffolk. With the help of local leaders in Norfolk, (and more funds from Rogers), a route was obtained set which passed around the City of Norfolk (and the N&W) in a wide, 13-mile long circular path through rural Norfolk County to be headed almost due west again when it reached the site for a new coal pier on the harbor at Hampton Roads at Sewell's Point.

By the time the leaders of the big railroads finally realized that the Deepwater and Tidewater railroads were related, the rights-of-way were secure, and the new competitor could not be blocked. In 1906, N&W president Lucius E. Johnson was brought to the Standard Oil building at 26 Broadway in New York City by Andrew Carnegie to meet with one of Carnegie's old friends: Henry Huttleston Rogers. N&W corporate records only record that the meeting lasted only a few minutes. Thus, the leaders of the big railroads finally learned the source of William Nelson Page's deep pockets. Despite their collusion, there would be new player in their games.

==== Virginian Railway growth and decline ====
In 1907, the Deepwater and Tidewater were combined to become the Virginian Railway (VGN). Victoria, a new town created in Lunenburg County, Virginia, became the Division Headquarters east of Roanoke. Using more modern techniques than had been available to the older major railroads during the 19th century, and the Rogers fortune to build to the highest standards and acquire the finest equipment and rolling stock, it was widely considered an engineering marvel of the times when completed all the way from Deepwater to reach a port near Norfolk, Virginia on Hampton Roads in 1909, a distance of about 360 miles (580 km).Princeton was designated to be the headquarters of the New River Division, extending from Roanoke westward.

The changes from steam to diesel-electric motive power and the mergers and consolidations resulted in elimination of many shops and jobs, aggravated by a reduction in coal mining activity in West Virginia. Eventually, all but a few of these jobs in Princeton were eliminated by the late 20th century. The Norfolk and Western Railroad maintained coal piers and export facilities at a major facility near downtown Norfolk known as Lambert's Point. After the 1959 merger, the VGN's former coal piers and yards at Sewell's Point were redundant with the Lambert's Point operations. They were eventually shut down, and the land became part of the massive U.S. Naval Station Norfolk, the largest Navy base in the world.

Most of the unused former VGN Princeton Shops facilities were demolished by 2006. The local residents of Princeton were devastated. However, despite the community's loss, a new replica of the VGN's two-story Princeton Passenger Station and Offices had been recently built, the largest such effort in the entire state. A modern structure functionally, while appearing like the original built 100 about years earlier, the new Princeton Station Museum should last for future generations. It hosts a museum to the town's rich railroading heritage and the Virginian Railway.

== Geography and climate ==
According to the United States Census Bureau, the city has a total area of 3.05 square miles (7.90 km^{2}), of which 3.01 square miles (7.80 km^{2}) is land and 0.04 square miles (0.10 km^{2}) is water.

The average altitude of Princeton is 2400 ft, with highest points at 3100 ft and lowest points at 1700 ft, above sea level.

Climate data for Princeton, West Virginia
Month	Jan	Feb	Mar	Apr	May	Jun	Jul	Aug	Sep	Oct	Nov	Dec	Year
Record high °F (°C)	72 (22)	75 (24)	83 (28)	88 (31)	89 (32)	97 (36)	96 (36)	95 (35)	93 (34)	88 (31)	81 (27)	74 (23)	97 (36)
Mean daily maximum °F (°C)	42 (6)	46 (8)	54 (12)	65 (18)	72 (22)	79 (26)	81 (27)	81 (27)	75 (24)	66 (19)	56 (13)	45 (7)	64 (17)
Mean daily minimum °F (°C)	26 (−3)	29 (−2)	36 (2)	45 (7)	53 (12)	61 (16)	65 (18)	64 (18)	57 (14)	47 (8)	39 (4)	30 (−1)	46 (8)
Record low °F (°C)	−21 (−29)	−9 (−23)	−2 (−19)	15 (−9)	24 (−4)	37 (3)	40 (4)	39 (4)	30 (−1)	18 (−8)	7 (−14)	−13 (−25)	−21 (−29)
Source: The Weather Channel

== Demographics ==
Historical population
Census	Pop.	Note	%±
1890	320		—
1910	3,027		—
1920	6,224		105.6%
1930	6,955		11.7%
1940	7,426		6.8%
1950	8,279		11.5%
1960	8,393		1.4%
1970	7,253		−13.6%
1980	7,538		3.9%
1990	7,043		−6.6%
2000	6,347		−9.9%
2010	6,432		1.3%
2020	5,872		−8.7%
U.S. Decennial Census 2020

=== 2020 census ===
As of the 2020 census, Princeton had a population of 5,872. The median age was 42.9 years. 19.0% of residents were under the age of 18 and 22.5% of residents were 65 years of age or older. For every 100 females there were 90.3 males, and for every 100 females age 18 and over there were 87.3 males age 18 and over.

100.0% of residents lived in urban areas, while 0.0% lived in rural areas.

There were 2,664 households in Princeton, of which 25.2% had children under the age of 18 living in them. Of all households, 34.3% were married-couple households, 20.6% were households with a male householder and no spouse or partner present, and 37.8% were households with a female householder and no spouse or partner present. About 37.5% of all households were made up of individuals and 18.7% had someone living alone who was 65 years of age or older.

There were 3,091 housing units, of which 13.8% were vacant. The homeowner vacancy rate was 3.0% and the rental vacancy rate was 12.8%.

Racial composition as of the 2020 census
Race	Number	Percent
White	5,014	85.4%
Black or African American	396	6.7%
American Indian and Alaska Native	23	0.4%
Asian	52	0.9%
Native Hawaiian and Other Pacific Islander	2	0.0%
Some other race	48	0.8%
Two or more races	337	5.7%
Hispanic or Latino (of any race)	132	2.2%

=== 2010 census ===
As of the census of 2010, there were 6,432 people, 3,030 households, and 1,683 families residing in the city. The population density was 2,136.9 inhabitants per square mile (825.1/km^{2}). There were 3,489 housing units at an average density of 1,159.1 per square mile (447.5/km^{2}). The racial makeup of the city was 90.7% White, 6.3% African American, 0.3% Native American, 0.8% Asian, 0.2% from other races, and 1.8% from two or more races. Hispanic or Latino people of any race were 1.1% of the population.

There were 3,030 households, of which 24.1% had children under the age of 18 living with them, 36.5% were married couples living together, 14.6% had a female householder with no husband present, 4.5% had a male householder with no wife present, and 44.5% were non-families. 38.3% of all households were made up of individuals, and 18.4% had someone living alone who was 65 years of age or older. The average household size was 2.12 and the average family size was 2.79.

The median age in the city was 42.6 years. 19.4% of residents were under the age of 18; 9.2% were between the ages of 18 and 24; 24.4% were from 25 to 44; 26.6% were from 45 to 64; and 20.7% were 65 years of age or older. The gender makeup of the city was 46.5% male and 53.5% female.

=== 2000 census ===
As of the census of 2000, there were 6,347 people, 2,967 households, and 1,661 families residing in the city. The population density was 2,116.6 people per square mile (816.9/km^{2}). There were 3,371 housing units at an average density of 1,124.2 per square mile (433.9/km^{2}). The racial makeup of the city was 92.03% White, 6.21% African American, 0.30% Native American, 0.43% Asian, 0.02% Pacific Islander, 0.19% from other races, and 0.84% from two or more races. Hispanic or Latino people of any race were 0.52% of the population.

There were 2,967 households, out of which 20.0% had children under the age of 18 living with them, 40.8% were married couples living together, 12.0% had a female householder with no husband present, and 44.0% were non-families. 39.6% of all households were made up of individuals, and 21.9% had someone living alone who was 65 years of age or older. The average household size was 2.09 and the average family size was 2.79.

In the city, the population was spread out, with 18.4% under the age of 18, 7.9% from 18 to 24, 24.1% from 25 to 44, 23.8% from 45 to 64, and 25.8% who were 65 years of age or older. The median age was 45 years. For every 100 females, there were 81.2 males. For every 100 females age 18 and over, there were 77.7 males.

The median income for a household in the city was $21,736, and the median income for a family was $32,443. Males had a median income of $25,347 versus $19,750 for females. The per capita income for the city was $14,931. About 16.0% of families and 24.1% of the population were below the poverty line, including 35.9% of those under age 18 and 15.9% of those age 65 or over.

== Education ==
All county residents are in the Mercer County School District.

== Culture ==
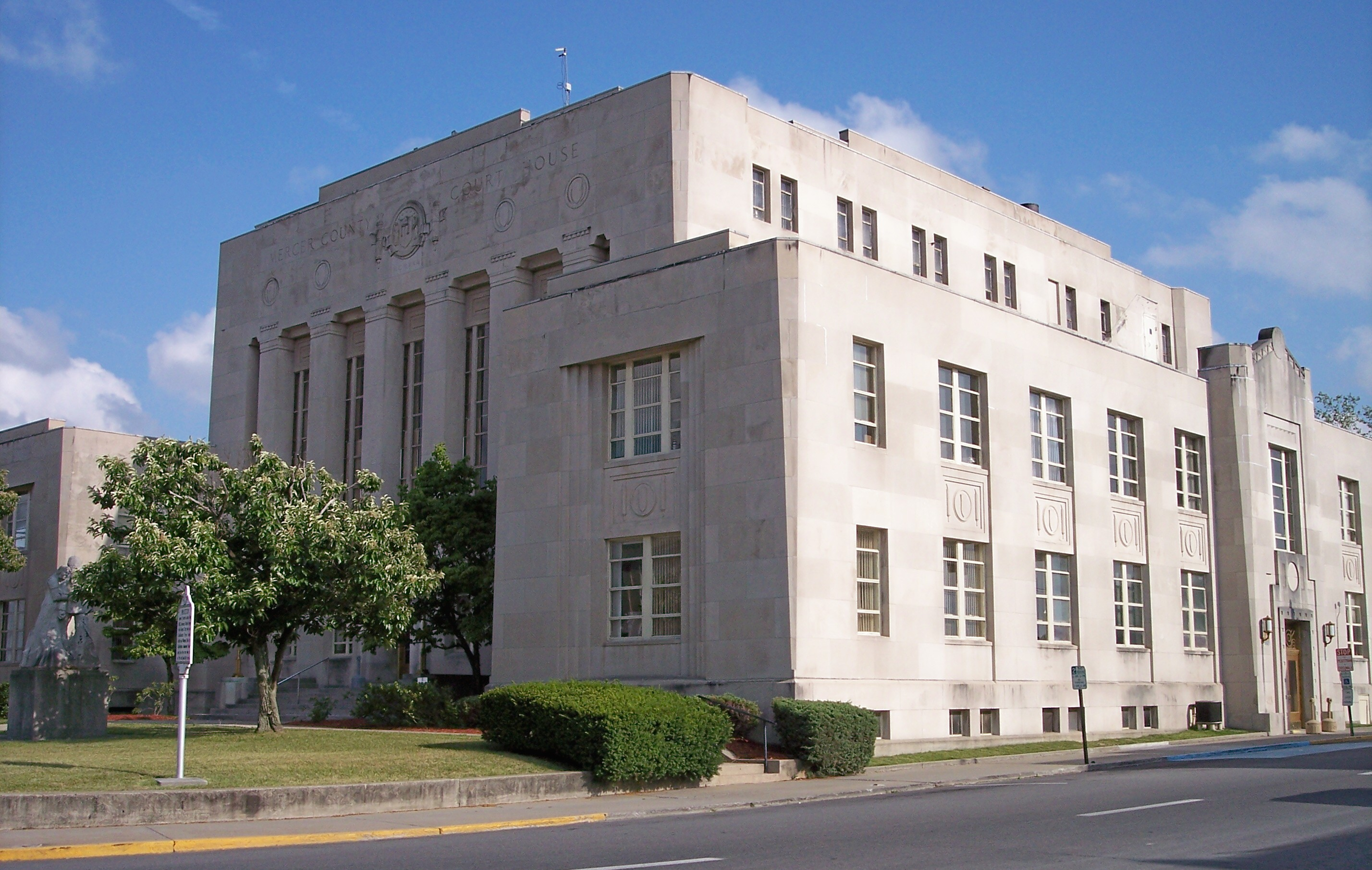
Mercer County Courthouse

The cultural hub is the Chuck Mathena Center, which opened in July 2008, contains a 1,000-seat theater and meeting rooms for civic groups and events. Other cultural endeavors include the RiffRaff Arts Collective, the remodeled Princeton Public Library and a Railroad Museum.

The Dr. James W. Hale House, Dr. Robert B. McNutt House, and Mercer County Courthouse are listed on the National Register of Historic Places. The Mercer Street Historic District and Virginian Railway Yard Historic District are nationally recognized historic districts.

== Sports ==
The Princeton Whistlepigs is the town's Minor league baseball team. They are now discontinued. The team played its home games at H. P. Hunnicutt Field. In conjunction with a contraction of Minor League Baseball beginning with the 2021 season, the Appalachian League was reorganized as a collegiate summer baseball league, and the Rays were replaced by a new franchise, the Whistlepigs, in the revamped league designed for rising college freshmen and sophomores.

== Twin town ==
- Yoshkar-Ola, Russia

== Notable people ==
- Bob Denver, television actor.
- William Eskridge, American legal scholar.
- Lee Patton, legendary coach at Princeton High School and West Virginia University.
- Nat Reese, former blues musician
- Joseph Shrader, retired United States Marine Corps major general
- Rod Thorn, Hall of Fame basketball player and executive.
