= Mercer County, West Virginia =

County in West Virginia, United States

- County
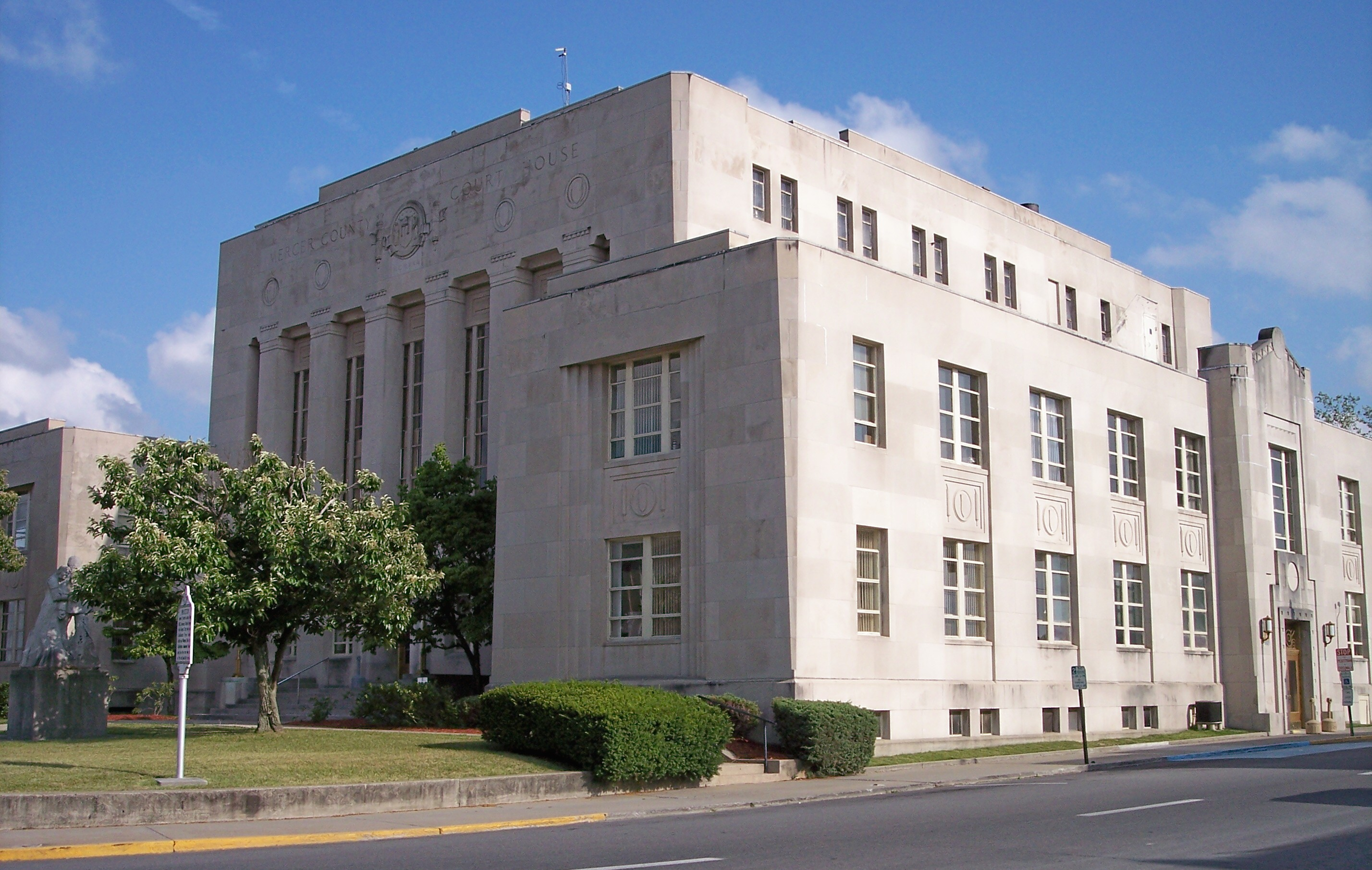
- The Mercer County Courthouse in Princeton in 2007

- Flag Seal

- Location within the U.S. state of West Virginia
- Coordinates: 37°25′N 81°07′W
- Country: United States
- State: West Virginia
- Founded: March 17, 1837
- Seat: Princeton
- Largest town: Bluefield

Area
  - Total: 421 sq mi (1,090 km^{2})
  - Land: 419 sq mi (1,090 km^{2})
  - Water: 1.7 sq mi (4.4 km^{2}) 0.4%

Population (2020)
  - Total: 59,664
  - Estimate (2025): 57,503 ▼
  - Density: 142/sq mi (55.0/km^{2})
- Time zone: UTC−5 (Eastern)
  - Summer (DST): UTC−4 (EDT)
- Congressional district: 1st
- Website: https://mercercountywv.com/

Mercer County is a county in Southern West Virginia on the southeastern border of the U.S. state of West Virginia. At the 2020 census, the population was 59,664. Its county seat is Princeton. The county was originally established in the State of Virginia by act of its General Assembly on March 17, 1837, using lands taken from Giles and Tazewell counties.

Mercer County is part of the Bluefield, WV-VA Micropolitan Statistical Area.

== History ==
Mercer County was named for the American Revolutionary General Hugh Mercer.

- Battle of Clark's House (1862)

== Geography ==
According to the United States Census Bureau, the county has a total area of 421 square miles (1,090 km^{2}), of which 419 square miles (1,090 km^{2}) is land and 1.7 square miles (4.4 km^{2}) (0.4%) is water.

In 1863, West Virginia's counties were divided into civil townships, with the intention of encouraging local government. This proved impractical in the heavily rural state, and in 1872 the townships were converted into magisterial districts. Mercer County was divided into five districts: Beaver Pond, East River, Jumping Branch, Plymouth, and Rock. In the 1970s, Mercer County's five historic districts were consolidated into three new magisterial districts: District 1, District 2, and District 3. The new districts were renamed "District I", "District II" and "District III" during the 1980s.

=== Major highways ===
- I-73 (future)
- I-74 (future)
- Interstate 77
- U.S. Highway 19
- U.S. Highway 52
- U.S. Highway 460
- West Virginia Route 10
- West Virginia Route 20
- West Virginia Route 44
- West Virginia Route 71
- West Virginia Route 112

The West Virginia Turnpike, now part of Interstate 77, begins in Princeton.

=== Adjacent counties ===
- Raleigh County (north)
- Summers County (northeast)
- Giles County, Virginia (east)
- Bland County, Virginia (south)
- Tazewell County, Virginia (southwest)
- McDowell County (west)
- Wyoming County (northwest)

=== National protected area ===
- Bluestone National Scenic River (part)

== Demographics ==
Historical population
Census	Pop.	Note	%±
1840	2,233		—
1850	4,222		89.1%
1860	6,819		61.5%
1870	7,064		3.6%
1880	7,467		5.7%
1890	16,002		114.3%
1900	23,023		43.9%
1910	38,371		66.7%
1920	49,558		29.2%
1930	61,323		23.7%
1940	68,289		11.4%
1950	75,013		9.8%
1960	68,206		−9.1%
1970	63,206		−7.3%
1980	73,942		17.0%
1990	64,980		−12.1%
2000	62,980		−3.1%
2010	62,264		−1.1%
2020	59,664		−4.2%
2025 (est.)	57,503	▼	−3.6%
U.S. Decennial Census; 1790–1960 1900–1990; 1990–2000 2010–2020

=== 2020 census ===
As of the 2020 census, the county had a population of 59,664. Of the residents, 20.2% were under the age of 18 and 22.1% were 65 years of age or older; the median age was 44.0 years. For every 100 females there were 93.3 males, and for every 100 females age 18 and over there were 90.1 males.

The racial makeup of the county was 88.1% White, 6.2% Black or African American, 0.3% American Indian and Alaska Native, 0.5% Asian, 0.4% from some other race, and 4.4% from two or more races. Hispanic or Latino residents of any race comprised 1.2% of the population.

There were 25,356 households in the county, of which 25.8% had children under the age of 18 living with them and 30.5% had a female householder with no spouse or partner present. About 31.5% of all households were made up of individuals and 15.0% had someone living alone who was 65 years of age or older.

There were 29,321 housing units, of which 13.5% were vacant. Among occupied housing units, 70.3% were owner-occupied and 29.7% were renter-occupied. The homeowner vacancy rate was 2.1% and the rental vacancy rate was 12.3%.

Mercer County, West Virginia – Racial and ethnic composition Note: the US Census treats Hispanic/Latino as an ethnic category. This table excludes Latinos from the racial categories and assigns them to a separate category. Hispanics/Latinos may be of any race.
Race / Ethnicity (NH = Non-Hispanic)	Pop 2000	Pop 2010	Pop 2020	% 2000	% 2010	% 2020
White alone (NH)	58,073	56,711	52,264	92.20%	91.08%	87.59%
Black or African American alone (NH)	3,657	3,740	3,694	5.80%	6.00%	6.19%
Native American or Alaska Native alone (NH)	121	135	159	0.19%	0.21%	0.26%
Asian alone (NH)	288	323	292	0.45%	0.51%	0.48%
Pacific Islander alone (NH)	7	2	6	0.01%	0.00%	0.01%
Other race alone (NH)	37	38	139	0.05%	0.06%	0.23%
Mixed race or Multiracial (NH)	512	835	2,405	0.81%	1.34%	4.03%
Hispanic or Latino (any race)	285	480	705	0.45%	0.77%	1.18%
Total	62,980	62,264	59,664	100.00%	100.00%	100.00%

=== 2010 census ===
As of the census of 2010, there were 62,264 people, 26,603 households, and 17,313 families living in the county. The population density was 148.6 inhabitants per square mile (57.4/km^{2}). There were 30,115 housing units at an average density of 71.9 units per square mile (27.8 units/km^{2}). The racial makeup of the county was 91.6% white, 6.1% black or African American, 0.5% Asian, 0.2% American Indian, 0.2% from other races, and 1.4% from two or more races. Those of Hispanic or Latino origin made up 0.8% of the population. In terms of ancestry, 16.4% were Irish, 14.2% were German, 12.0% were English, and 11.2% were American.

Of the 26,603 households, 27.8% had children under the age of 18 living with them, 47.6% were married couples living together, 12.9% had a female householder with no husband present, 34.9% were non-families, and 30.1% of all households were made up of individuals. The average household size was 2.30 and the average family size was 2.83. The median age was 42.5 years.

The median income for a household in the county was $32,131 and the median income for a family was $42,517. Males had a median income of $37,423 versus $25,778 for females. The per capita income for the county was $18,431. About 16.0% of families and 22.8% of the population were below the poverty line, including 32.5% of those under age 18 and 11.4% of those age 65 or over.

=== 2000 census ===
As of the census of 2000, there were 62,980 people, 26,509 households, and 17,946 families living in the county. The population density was 150 people per square mile (58 people/km^{2}). There were 30,143 housing units at an average density of 72 units per square mile (28 units/km^{2}). The racial makeup of the county was 92.56% White, 5.82% Black or African American, 0.19% Native American, 0.46% Asian, 0.01% Pacific Islander, 0.10% from other races, and 0.85% from two or more races. 0.45% of the population were Hispanic or Latino of any race.

There were 26,509 households, out of which 26.70% had children under the age of 18 living with them, 53.00% were married couples living together, 11.20% had a female householder with no husband present, and 32.30% were non-families. 28.70% of all households were made up of individuals, and 13.60% had someone living alone who was 65 years of age or older. The average household size was 2.33 and the average family size was 2.85.

In the county, the population was spread out, with 21.10% under the age of 18, 9.80% from 18 to 24, 26.20% from 25 to 44, 25.50% from 45 to 64, and 17.40% who were 65 years of age or older. The median age was 40 years. For every 100 females, there were 91.10 males. For every 100 females age 18 and over, there were 87.70 males.

The median income for a household in the county was $26,628, and the median income for a family was $33,524. Males had a median income of $29,243 versus $19,013 for females. The per capita income for the county was $15,564. About 14.70% of families and 19.70% of the population were below the poverty line, including 28.90% of those under age 18 and 12.70% of those age 65 or over.

The county is part of the Bluefield, WV-VA micropolitan area.

== Politics ==
Mercer County's political history is largely typical of West Virginia. It was supportive of remaining with Confederate Virginia when the state was created and voted Democratic in the first few post-Civil War elections. However, the influence of coal industry executives turned the county towards the GOP during the "System of 1896". As with most of West Virginia, extensive unionization caused the county to swing to the Democratic Party during most of the twentieth century, but an extremely rapid swing towards the Republican Party has occurred since 2000, due to declining unionization, along with regional views on environmental, social and cultural issues that are increasingly at odds with the national Democratic Party.

Political Party	Number of registered voters (March 31, 2022)	%
Republican	14,120	39.57
Democratic	10,861	30.43
Independent	9,266	25.96
Libertarian	222	0.62
Mountain	78	0.22
Other	1,141	3.20
Total	35,688	100.00

United States presidential election results for Mercer County, West Virginia
Year	Republican		Democratic		Third party(ies)	
Year	No.	%	No.	%	No.	%
1912	1,507	18.56%	3,497	43.07%	3,116	38.37%
1916	4,788	49.47%	4,836	49.96%	55	0.57%
1920	8,613	51.73%	7,981	47.93%	56	0.34%
1924	9,159	42.86%	10,058	47.07%	2,153	10.07%
1928	12,887	55.52%	10,273	44.26%	50	0.22%
1932	11,088	40.93%	15,900	58.69%	105	0.39%
1936	10,762	36.88%	18,391	63.02%	30	0.10%
1940	11,395	38.55%	18,163	61.45%	0	0.00%
1944	10,034	40.31%	14,861	59.69%	0	0.00%
1948	10,065	39.71%	15,201	59.97%	82	0.32%
1952	14,267	46.08%	16,694	53.92%	0	0.00%
1956	14,648	52.53%	13,236	47.47%	0	0.00%
1960	11,719	40.40%	17,289	59.60%	0	0.00%
1964	8,905	32.74%	18,298	67.26%	0	0.00%
1968	9,985	38.28%	12,739	48.83%	3,363	12.89%
1972	17,846	69.52%	7,826	30.48%	0	0.00%
1976	10,791	42.23%	14,761	57.77%	0	0.00%
1980	12,273	49.61%	11,804	47.71%	664	2.68%
1984	13,910	60.07%	9,164	39.58%	81	0.35%
1988	10,221	50.03%	10,152	49.69%	57	0.28%
1992	7,888	38.91%	9,511	46.91%	2,876	14.18%
1996	7,768	41.54%	8,721	46.64%	2,211	11.82%
2000	10,206	54.07%	8,347	44.22%	322	1.71%
2004	13,057	58.34%	9,178	41.01%	144	0.64%
2008	13,246	62.81%	7,450	35.33%	393	1.86%
2012	15,450	72.49%	5,432	25.49%	431	2.02%
2016	17,404	75.03%	4,704	20.28%	1,089	4.69%
2020	19,237	76.53%	5,556	22.10%	342	1.36%
2024	18,372	77.90%	4,851	20.57%	361	1.53%

== Education ==
The Mercer County Public School System has nineteen elementary schools, including Athens, Bluefield Intermediate, Bluewell, Brushfork, Ceres, Glenwood Elementary, Lashmeet-Matoaka, Melrose, Memorial, Mercer County Early Learning - Bluefield and Princeton sites, Mercer, Montcalm, Oakvale (funding for constructing a new Oakvale school has been approved), Princeton Primary, Spanishburg, Straley, Sun Valley and Whitethorn. There are six middle school facilities including Princeton Middle, Bluefield Middle, Montcalm Middle, PikeView Middle, and Glenwood Middle. There are also four high school facilities, including Princeton Senior (AAA), Bluefield High (AA), Montcalm High (A) and PikeView High (AA). The Mercer County Technical Education Center, which is being transitioned into a comprehensive technical high school. Mercer County Schools educates approximately 9200 students. The professional and service staff number about 1200.

Higher educational institutions include Bluefield State College, located in Bluefield; Concord University, located in Athens; and New River Community and Technical College, located in Princeton, West Virginia.

== Law enforcement ==
Mercer County is protected by seven agencies. Five agencies protect the incorporated areas of the county, but the non-incorporated area is the primary responsibility of the Mercer County Sheriff's Department. The Mercer County Sheriff's Department consists of 30 sworn law enforcement officers and a number of civilian employees. Within the Mercer County Sheriff's Department are several specialized units to better serve the citizens.

K-9 Unit: Deputy Ballard (Quando), Deputy Parks (Arrow), Deputy Rose (Mitis), & Deputy Ellsion (Max).

Detective Bureau: Cpl. Murphy, Detective Sparks, & Detective Combs.

SWAT: Sgt. G. W. Woods, Cpl. J. J. Ruble, Cpl. S. A. Sommers, & Detective Combs. The rest of the team consists of other agencies within the county, excluding the State Police.

The Sheriff's Department has one dedicated Deputy who serves on the Southern Regional Drug and Violent Crime Task Force.

Mercer County is also home to the Princeton Detachment of the West Virginia State Police and a Turnpike Detachment (Highway Patrol).

== Communities ==
=== Cities ===
- Bluefield (largest city)
- Princeton (county seat)

=== Towns ===
- Athens
- Bramwell
- Oakvale

=== Magisterial districts ===
- District I
- District II
- District III

=== Census-designated places ===
- Bluewell
- Brush Fork
- Lashmeet
- Montcalm
- Matoaka

== See also ==
- Camp Creek State Park
- National Register of Historic Places listings in Mercer County, West Virginia
- Pinnacle Rock State Park
- Pipestem Resort State Park
- Pocahontas coalfield
- Tate Lohr Wildlife Management Area
