= U.S. Route 52 in West Virginia =

Section of U.S. highway in West Virginia

U.S. Route 52
- US 52 highlighted in red

Route information
- Length: 184.9 mi (297.6 km)
- Existed: 1926–present

Major junctions
- South end: I-77 / US 52 at Rocky Gap, VA
- US 460 / WV 108 near Bluefield; WV 20 at Bluewell; WV 16 / WV 103 at Welch; WV 80 from Iaeger to Justice; WV 44 at Mountain View; US 119 in Williamson; WV 65 at Naugatuck; I-64 in Huntington
- North end: US 52 near Chesapeake, OH

Location
- Country: United States
- Counties: Mercer, McDowell, Wyoming, Logan, Mingo, Pike (KY), Wayne, Cabell

Highway system
- United States Numbered Highway System; List; Special; Divided
- West Virginia State Highway System; Interstate; US; State
- Kentucky State Highway System; Interstate; US; State; Parkways
← WV 51	WV	→ WV 53
← US 51	KY	→ KY 52

U.S. Route 52 (US 52) skirts the western fringes of the U.S. state of West Virginia. It runs from the Virginia state line near Bluefield, where it is concurrent with Interstate 77 (I-77), in a general northwest and north direction to I-64 at Kenova. There it turns east, overlapping I-64 for five miles (8.0 km) before splitting off onto the West Huntington Expressway into Ohio via the West Huntington Bridge. Despite having an even number, US 52 is signed north–south in West Virginia. In some other states along its route, it is signed east-west. The West Virginia segment is signed such that US 52 north corresponds to the general westward direction of the highway, and vice versa. For a while, US 52 parallels US 23, which is on the other side of the Big Sandy River in Kentucky. This continues into Ohio, where US 52 travels on the Ohio side of the Ohio River while US 23 travels on the Kentucky side.

Most of the route is being converted to a four-lane divided highway, but not to interstate standards. From I-77 south of Bluefield to near Williamson, the new highway has been referenced to as the King Coal Highway; from Williamson north to Kenova, it is the Tolsia Highway.

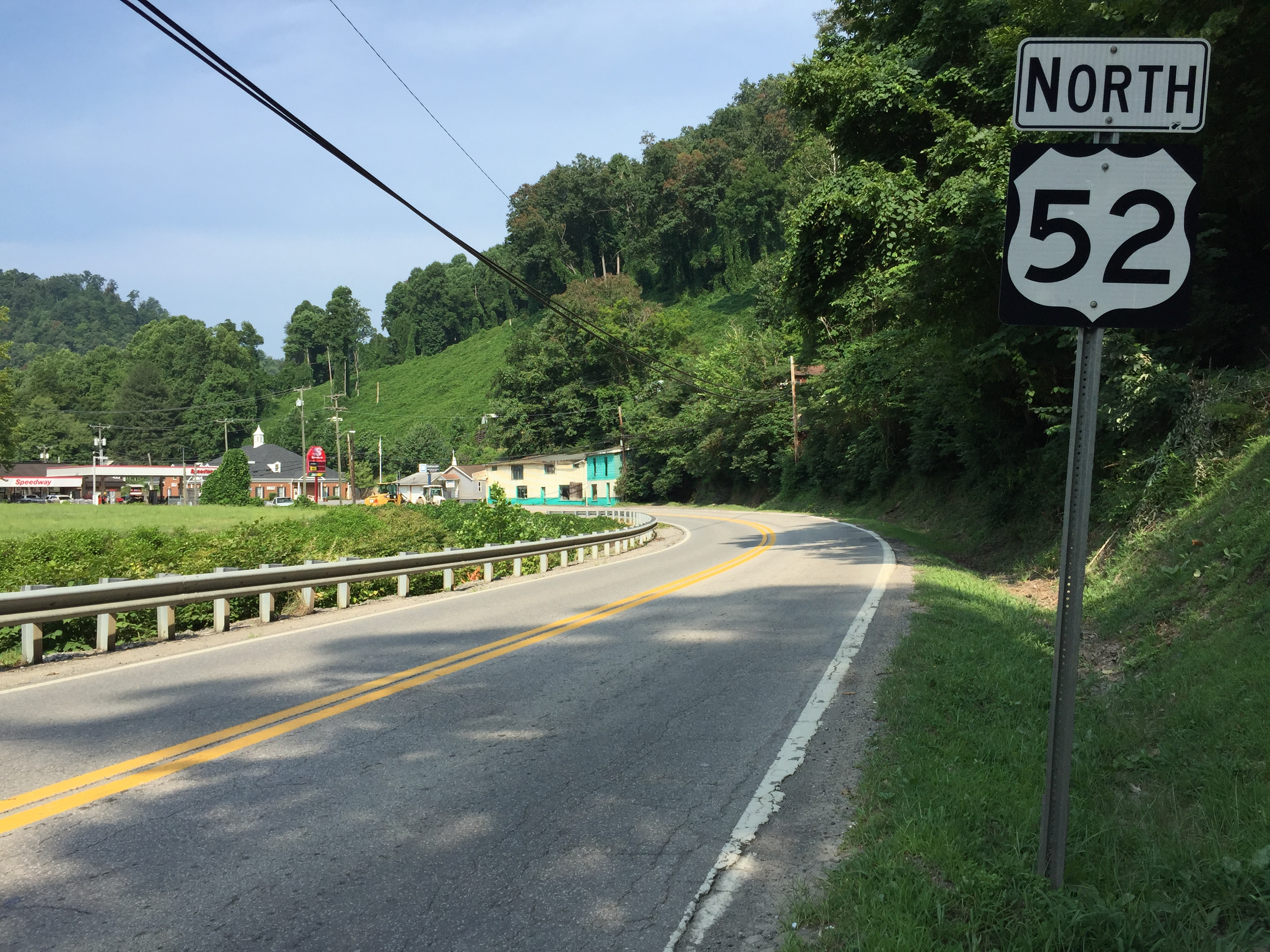
View north along current US 52 in Gilbert

== History ==
=== West Huntington Expressway ===
The West Huntington Expressway is a controlled-access elevated highway that crosses the west end of Huntington WV. It was constructed in 1965 and originally signed as West Virginia Route 94 (WV 94). The first segment to open was a stub from I-64 to Jefferson Avenue in West Huntington in the fall of 1965. This included a bridge over a CSX railroad mainline. In the early 1970s, the expressway was extended northward across what is now the Nick Joe Rahall II Bridge across the Ohio River to US 52 and State Route 7 in Ohio.

Tolls were collected at the Ohio River bridge until the mid-1980s. The expressway has four lanes from I-64 to the US 60 interchange, where it drops to two lanes for the remainder of the highway, which includes the Ohio River bridge. The expressway was renumbered US 52 in 1979 when that highway was re-routed out of downtown Huntington to a new alignment on I-64 west to the Tolsia Highway south of Kenova.

=== Tolsia Highway ===
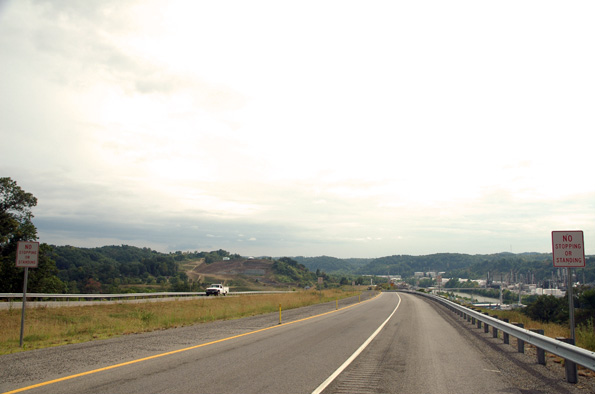
A 2005 photograph of US 52 and WV 75 ending at an interchange stub south of Kenova, West Virginia.

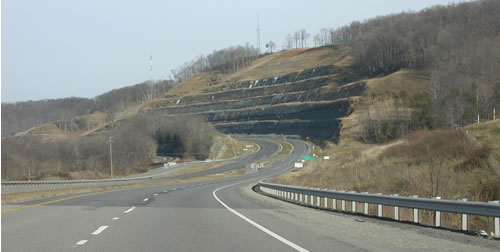
US 52 at Prichard, West Virginia where the 1998 and 2001 sections join; it is visible by the change of pavement.

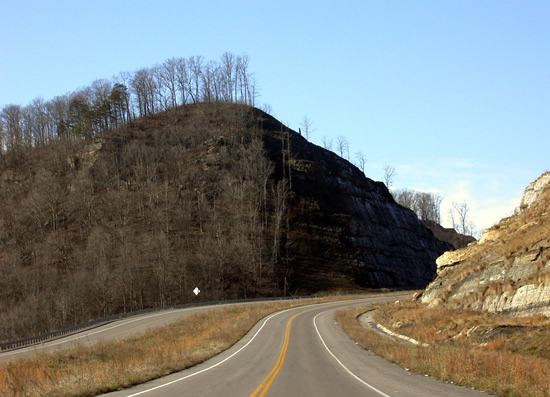
The Crum, West Virginia bypass.

The Tolsia Highway is defined as running from I-64 at Kenova to Corridor G (US 119) north of Williamson. The name Tolsia takes the names from the first initials of the Tug, Ohio, Levisa, and Sandy Improvement Association. US 52 originally took the path of WV 152, approximately 10 miles (16 km) east of the current alignment. In the mid-1960s, state funding was secured for a construction project along most of County Route 1 (CR 1), which ran along the Big Sandy River and Tug Fork River. The rebuilt CR 1 and CR 29 was renumbered as US 52 in 1979.

Portions of the 66-mile (106 km) highway have been widened to four lanes. In 1998, US 52 south of the I-64 interchange in Kenova was widened to four-lane highway standards to the access road for Tri-State Airport. In that same year, the Prichard bypass was opened to traffic with one interchange and one at-grade intersection. This four-mile (6.4 km) bypass includes very large rock cuts and a long and winding grade down a hill. In 2001, the four-lane highway was extended southward approximately two miles (3.2 km) to a stub interchange with WV 75. Also in that year, the four-lane highway near Prichard was extended northward for one-mile (1.6 km), removing some grades and curves along US 52. The extension was completed in 2002 at a cost of $9.6 million.

In 2001, the Crum segment of the Tolsia Highway opened to traffic. The highway, designated CR 152-46, begins just north of Crum at an incomplete diamond interchange and heads eastward towards CR 2. It has at-grade intersections with CR 52-47 and CR 52-31 along with a side road at the eastern terminus that takes traffic to CR 2. There are stubs for future bridges and ramps. Signage along this segment is minimal, with only a handful of arrows to designate the route. While the highway was built to four-lane standards, it is only striped for two.

In late 2002, Senator Robert C. Byrd received $20 million in funds to jump-start construction on the northern half of the Tolsia Highway. The money would be used to speed up construction on the 10-mile (16 km) link between Huntington and Prichard, serving several industrial parks and relieving two-lane US 52 of coal-truck congestion.

In 2003, survey and design of five miles (8.0 km) of four-lane US 52 from Prichard north to Cyrus were completed. Plans include an interchange and five bridge structures.

=== Williamson Bypass ===
US 52 enters Kentucky twice along the Williamson, West Virginia bypass; bridging the Tug Fork River was preferred because it prevented the blasting of several hillsides in West Virginia. It was completed in 1996 as part of the Corridor G (US 119) project. The speed limit in West Virginia is 65 mph (105 km/h) but drops to 55 mph (89 km/h) in Kentucky.

== Future ==
=== King Coal Highway ===
The King Coal Highway, also known as WV 108 near the Virginia border, is defined to run from WV 65 and Corridor G (US 119) near Belo, West Virginia, to I-77 at its US 52 interchange near Bluefield. The Coalfields Expressway (US 121) and the Shawnee Expressway will connect to the King Coal Highway.

The travel time, currently over 120 minutes from Williamson to Bluefield, will be reduced to 87 minutes. South of Ikes Fork, a two-hour trip to Bluefield will be reduced to 44 minutes.

Interchanges and intersections proposed for the King Coal Highway include:

Note that this is WVDOT’s preferred route and is subject to change.

- Mingo County:
  - Near Head of Isaban
  - Near Taylorville, West Virginia
  - Near Twisted Gun Gap, West Virginia
  - Near Delbarton
  - Near Sharon Heights
- Logan County:
  - Horsepen Mountain at Mountain View
- McDowell County:
  - Johnny Cake Mountain
  - Sandy Huff
  - Davy
  - Welch at Indian Ridge
  - Carswell Hollow near Kimball
  - Burke Mountain near Keystone
  - Near Crumpler
  - Near the head of Long Pole
  - Near the head of Isaban
- Wyoming County:
  - Indian Ridge near Steeles
  - Near Fanrock and Bailysville at Davy Mountain on Indian Ridge
  - Near Head of North Springs
  - Head of Burke Mountain near Herndon
- Mercer County:
  - Near Crystal
  - Near McComas
  - Near Sandlick
  - Near Montcalm
  - West Virginia Route 20 near Littlesburgh Road
  - West Virginia Route 123 - Airport Road
  - John Nash Boulevard

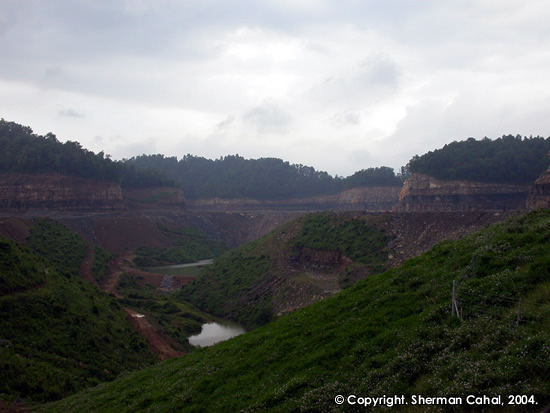
A former strip mining site being converted for the King Coal Highway and Coalfields Expressway three-level diamond interchange. Taken in 2004, construction is not expected on the actual interchange itself for years.

Construction began in 1999 on the three-level diamond interchange on Indian Ridge near Welch that will facilitate traffic between the King Coal Highway (US 52, Interstate 73/74) and the Coalfields Expressway (US 121).

Initial site work was completed in 2003, with grading evident; this required the filling in of a large valley. It will also be the site of a new state prison along with future industrial development.

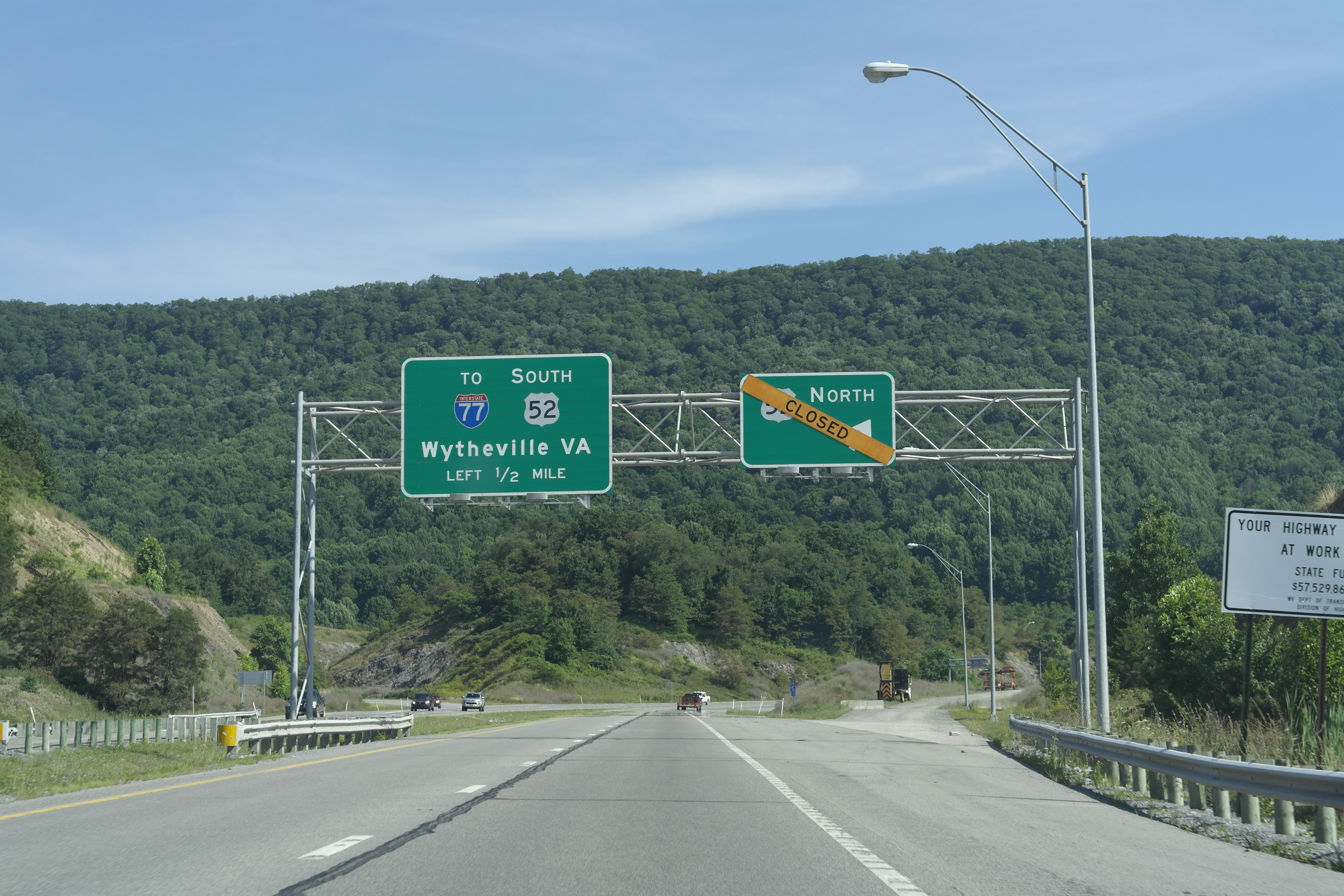
Unopened ramp leading to the King Coal Highway in Bluefield as seen on U.S. Route 460 in July 2019. This ramp opened to traffic on December 13, 2023.

Work has progressed on the four-lane widening of US 52 in Mercer County just east of Bluefield. On November 24, 2003, a contract totaling $2,057,914 was let to move approximately 500,000 cubic yards (380,000 m^{3}) of dirt and to grade and drain 0.22 miles (0.35 km) from the recently completed $27 million interchange with Corridor Q (US 460) east of Bluefield to US 19 just north of James P. Bailey Lake. Six buildings will be demolished. This is the first of several projects that will extend the King Coal Highway to WV 123 (Airport Road) north of Bluefield. Extending this project east, another contract was awarded December 15, 2003, and totals $1,371,251. The contract calls for more than 200,000 cubic yards (150,000 m^{3}) of excavation to grade and drain 0.18 miles (0.29 km) of the King Coal Highway from County Route 25 just north of the US 460 interchange to south of the old Raleigh-Grayson Turnpike. 36 buildings will be demolished. A future contract will include a bridge over US 19 which will cost $15 million.

Design work is being commenced on a 11-mile (18 km) segment of the King Coal Highway from Horsepen Mountain to Isaban and from the Mercer County Interchange to West Virginia Route 123/Airport Road. The work being done on a 2.5-mile (4.0 km) section of highway near Horsepen Mountain is being done by mining companies that will save taxpayers over $20 million.

The future of the project as a whole is very uncertain. In 2017, state lawmakers eliminated funding for the King Coal Highway Authority and its executive director as well as the Coalfields Expressway Authority. Both authorities were later shut down and local officials have been pushing for state lawmakers to reprioritize the construction of the King Coal Highway ever since. In June 2023, the West Virginia Department of Transportation (WVDOT) announced that bids were let for the construction of the highway near Gilbert. In August of the same year, design work began to extend the highway from its current construction at Airport Road in Bluefield northward towards Littlesburg Road. However, the state still has not made the King Coal Highway one of its top priorities and doubt about whether the highway will ever be completed remains.

== Major intersections ==
State	County	Location	mi	km	Destinations	Notes
West Virginia	East River Mountain		0.0	0.0	I-77 south / US 52 south – Wytheville	Continuation into Virginia
West Virginia	East River Mountain		0.0– 0.5	0.0– 0.80	East River Mountain Tunnel; Virginia–West Virginia state line	
West Virginia	Mercer	Bluefield	0.6	0.97	I-77 north / CR 2901 (Cumberland Industrial Center Road) – Beckley	Northern end of I-77 overlap; US 52 north follows exit 1
West Virginia	Mercer		2.9	4.7	US 460 east / WV 108 north – Princeton, Bluefield	Interchange; southern end of US 460 overlap
West Virginia	Mercer	Bluefield	5.2	8.4	US 460 west	Northern end of US 460 overlap
West Virginia	Mercer	Bluefield	6.6	10.6	WV 598 south to US 460	
West Virginia	Mercer	Bluefield	8.2	13.2	US 19 north / US 52 Truck south (Princeton Avenue)	Southern end of US 19 overlap
West Virginia	Mercer	Bluefield	9.0	14.5	US 19 south – Bluefield, VA	Northern end of US 19 overlap
West Virginia	Mercer	Brush Fork	10.9	17.5	WV 123 – Airport	
West Virginia	Mercer	Bluewell	13.1	21.1	WV 20 north – Princeton	
West Virginia	Mercer	Bluewell	13.3	21.4	WV 71 north / CR 526 (Cutoff Road) – Matoaka	
West Virginia	Mercer	Bramwell	13.7	22.0	CR 120 south – Pocahontas, VA, Bramwell Historic District	
West Virginia	McDowell	Elkhorn	25.1	40.4	WV 161 south – Anawalt	
West Virginia	McDowell	Welch	40.1	64.5	US 52 Alt. north to WV 16 – Welch	
West Virginia	McDowell	Welch	42.1	67.8	US 52 Alt. south / WV 16 north / WV 103 east – Gary, Welch	Southern end of WV 16 overlap
West Virginia	McDowell	Welch	43.0	69.2	WV 16 south – Coalwood, War	Northern end of WV 16 overlap
West Virginia	McDowell	Iaeger	57.9	93.2	WV 80 south – Downtown Iaeger, Bradshaw	Southern end of WV 80 overlap
West Virginia	Wyoming	Hanover	68.4	110.1	WV 97 east – Pineville	
West Virginia	Mingo	Gilbert	74.9	120.5	WV 80 north – Man	Northern end of WV 80 overlap
West Virginia	Mingo	Mountain View	84.5	136.0	WV 44 north / CR 25257 (Old US 52) – Logan	Southern end of WV 44 overlap
West Virginia	Mingo		86.1	138.6	CR 8 (Beech Creek Road)	Northern end of WV 44 overlap
West Virginia	Mingo		95.6	153.9	WV 65 south – Matewan	Southern end of WV 65 overlap
West Virginia	Mingo		96.7	155.6	CR 25257 (Old US 52)	
West Virginia	Mingo	Delbarton	100.3	161.4	WV 65 north	Northern end of WV 65 overlap
West Virginia	Mingo	Williamson	106.0	170.6	WV 49 south – Matewan	
West Virginia	Mingo	Williamson	108.4	174.5	US 52 Truck north (Prichard Street)	
West Virginia	Mingo	Williamson	108.7	174.9	US 119 south – Williamson, Pikeville, KY	Southern end of US 119 overlap
			109.7– 0.0	176.5– 0.0	West Virginia–Kentucky state line	
Kentucky	Pike		0.085	0.137	To KY 292	
			0.2– 109.9	0.32– 176.9	Kentucky–West Virginia state line	
West Virginia	Mingo		110.6	178.0	CR 14 – Chattaroy	
			110.7– 0.8	178.2– 1.3	West Virginia–Kentucky state line	
Kentucky	Pike		1.0	1.6	KY 292	Interchange
			1.6– 112.3	2.6– 180.7	Kentucky–West Virginia state line	
West Virginia	Mingo	Nolan	115.2	185.4	CR 5219 (Nolan Street)	To permanently closed Nolan Toll Bridge
West Virginia	Mingo		116.9	188.1	US 119 north – Logan	Northern end of US 119 overlap
West Virginia	Mingo	Naugatuck	122.0	196.3	WV 65 south – Delbarton	
West Virginia	Mingo	Kermit	128.3	206.5	To Virginia Avenue / KY 292 – Inez, KY	To Kermit Bridge
West Virginia	Wayne		136.4	219.5	CR 15246 (Crum Bypass)	
West Virginia	Wayne		138.7	223.2	WV 152 north	
West Virginia	Wayne	Fort Gay	156.4	251.7	WV 37 west – Fort Gay, Louisa, KY	Southern end of WV 37 overlap
West Virginia	Wayne		157.5	253.5	WV 37 east – Wayne	Northern end of WV 37 overlap
West Virginia	Wayne		165.4	266.2	CR 5283 – Prichard	Interchange
West Virginia	Wayne		176.5	284.0	WV 75 east – Wayne	Southern end of WV 75 overlap
West Virginia	Wayne	Kenova	178.3	286.9	I-64 west / WV 75 west – Ceredo, Kenova, Ashland, KY	Northern end of WV 75 overlap; southern end of I-64 overlap; US 52 south follows exit 1
West Virginia	Cabell	Huntington	183.3	295.0	I-64 east – Huntington, Charleston	Northern end of I-64 overlap; US 52 north follows exit 6
West Virginia	Cabell	Huntington	184.0	296.1	Madison Avenue - VA Medical Center	Interchange; northbound exit and southbound entrance
West Virginia	Cabell	Huntington	184.3	296.6	US 60 (Adams Avenue) – West Huntington	Interchange
West Virginia	Ohio River		184.9	297.6	West Huntington Bridge; West Virginia–Ohio state line	
West Virginia	Ohio River		184.9	297.6	US 52 west – Ironton	Continuation into Ohio
1.000 mi = 1.609 km; 1.000 km = 0.621 mi: Concurrency terminus

U.S. Route 52
Previous state: Ohio	West Virginia	Next state: Kentucky
Previous state: Kentucky	West Virginia	Next state: Virginia

Interstate 73
Previous state: Virginia	West Virginia	Next state: Kentucky
Previous state: Kentucky	West Virginia	Next state: Ohio

Interstate 74
Previous state: Ohio	West Virginia	Next state: Kentucky
Previous state: Kentucky	West Virginia	Next state: Virginia
