= West Virginia Route 94 =

State highway in West Virginia, United States

West Virginia Route 94

Route information
- Maintained by WVDOH
- Length: 10.0 mi (16.1 km)

Major junctions
- South end: WV 3 in Racine
- I-64 / I-77 in Marmet
- North end: WV 61 in Marmet

Location
- Country: United States
- State: West Virginia
- Counties: Boone, Kanawha

Highway system
- West Virginia State Highway System; Interstate; US; State
← WV 93	→ WV 95

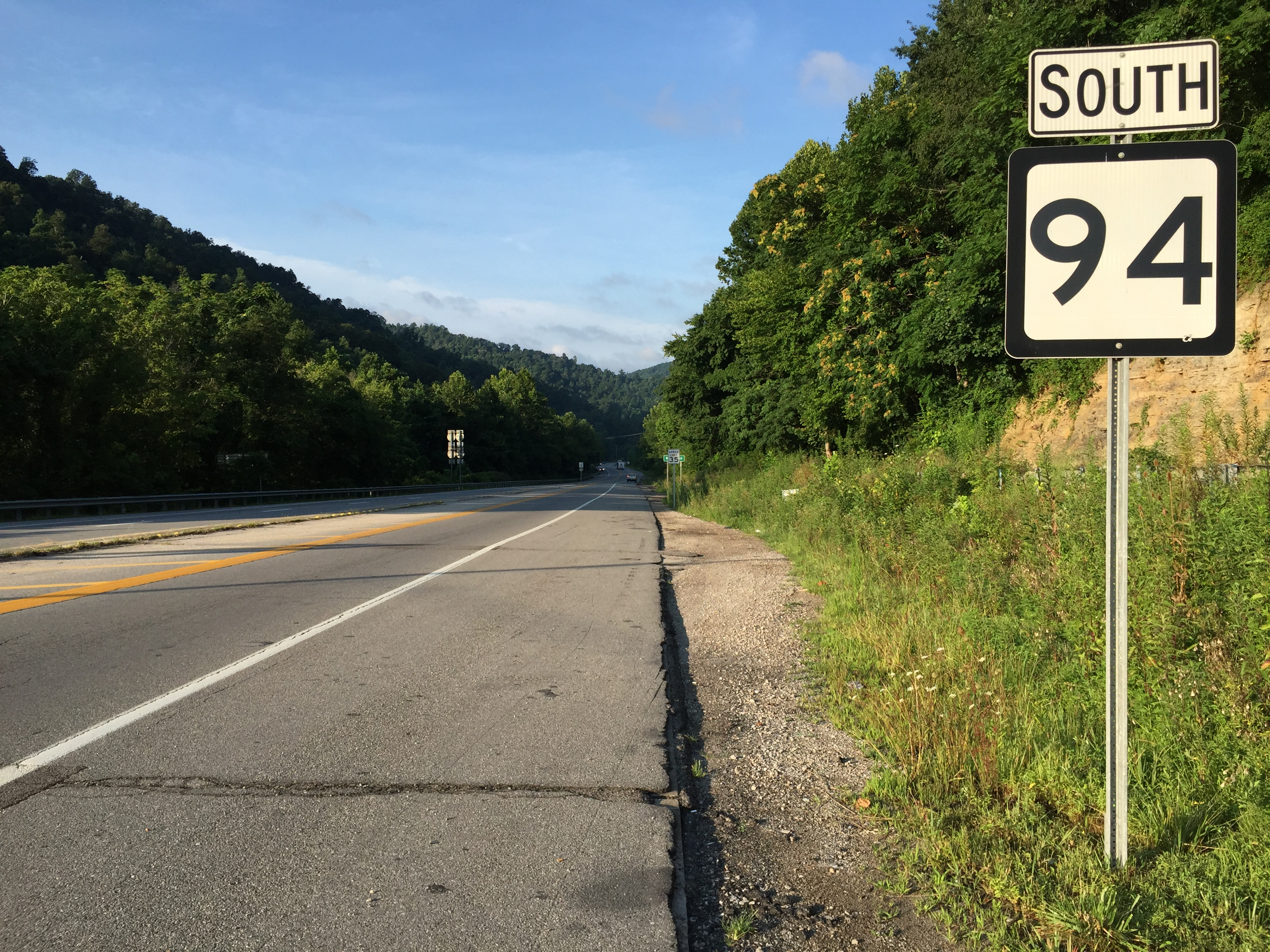
View south along WV 94 at I-64/I-77 in Marmet

West Virginia Route 94 is a 10-mile (16 km) long north–south route connecting Marmet and Racine in West Virginia. The southern terminus of the route is at West Virginia Route 3 in Racine. The northern terminus is at West Virginia Route 61 in Marmet.

WV 94 was once signed in West Huntington from Interstate 64 to the Nick Joe Rahall II Bridge beginning in 1970. In 1984, the route was decommissioned and replaced instead by US 52. With the completion of Corridor G in the 1980s and 1990s, WV 94 would later resurface, replacing U.S. Route 119's former corridor as it was realigned with Corridor G.

== Major intersections ==
County	Location	mi	km	Destinations	Notes
Boone	Racine			WV 3 – Whitesville, Madison	
Kanawha	Marmet			I-64 / I-77 – Charleston, Beckley	I-77 exit 89
Kanawha	Marmet			WV 61 – Marmet, Chesapeake, Montgomery	
1.000 mi = 1.609 km; 1.000 km = 0.621 mi
