= West Virginia Route 123 =

State highway in West Virginia, United States

West Virginia Route 123

Route information
- Maintained by WVDOH
- Length: 9.9 mi (15.9 km)

Major junctions
- West end: SR 643 near Falls Mills, VA
- US 52 at Brush Fork
- East end: US 19 / US 460 / CR 34 near Bluefield

Location
- Country: United States
- State: West Virginia
- Counties: Mercer

Highway system
- West Virginia State Highway System; Interstate; US; State
← WV 122	→ WV 125

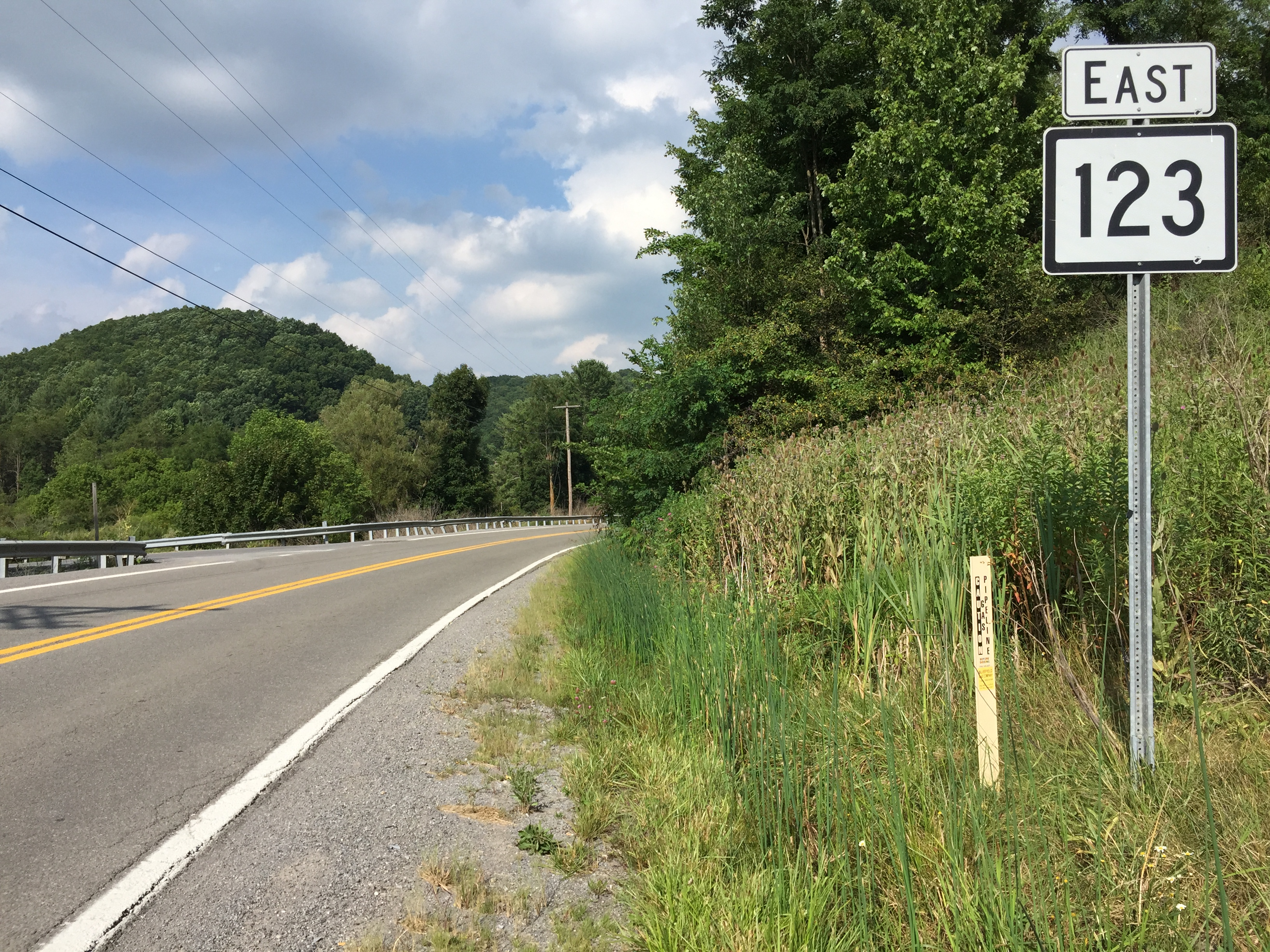
View east along WV 123 at US 52 in Brush Fork

West Virginia Route 123 is an east–west state highway located in the Bluefield, West Virginia area. The western terminus of the route is at the Virginia state line northwest of Bluefield, where WV 123 continues west as secondary State Route 643. The eastern terminus is at U.S. Route 19 and U.S. Route 460 northeast of Bluefield.

== Major intersections ==
The entire route is in Mercer County.

Location	mi	km	Destinations	Notes
	0.0	0.0	SR 643	Virginia state line; to SR 102
Brush Fork			US 52 – Welch, Bluefield	
Bluefield			WV 108 – Littlesburg, Bluefield	To be finished in the future
Green Valley	9.9	15.9	US 19 / US 460 / CR 34 (Clover Dew Dairy Road) – Princeton, Bluefield	
1.000 mi = 1.609 km; 1.000 km = 0.621 mi
