= The Turning (1992 film) =

1992 American film by L.A. Puopolo

- Film poster
- Directed by: L.A. Puopolo
- Screenplay by: L.A. Puopolo; Chris Ceraso
- Based on: Home Fires Burning by Chris Ceraso
- Produced by: William B. O'Boyle; L.A. Puopolo
- Starring: Karen Allen; Raymond J. Barry; Michael Dolan; Tess Harper; Gillian Anderson
- Cinematography: J. Michael McClary
- Edited by: Lesley Topping
- Music by: Herb Pilhofer
- Production companies: Puopolo Productions; White Deer Productions
- Distributed by: Phaedra Cinema
- Release date: May 2, 1992
- Running time: 91 minutes
- Country: United States
- Language: English

The Turning (alternately titled Home Fires Burning, Pocahontas or Pocahontas, Virginia) is a 1992 American independent Southern Gothic drama thriller film directed by L.A. Puopolo, based on the play Home Fires Burning by Chris Ceraso.

It is the film debut of actress Gillian Anderson. Both she and co-star Raymond J. Barry later appeared in the TV series The X-Files, although they did not have any scenes together.

The film was shot on location in Pocahontas, Virginia and the neighboring communities of Abbs Valley, Virginia and Nemours, West Virginia. It was released on home video in 1997.

== Plot ==
After four years away, Cliff Harnish (Michael Dolan) returns to his hometown of Pocahontas, Virginia in a bid to stop his parents' divorce. Unsuccessful, he finds that his mother, Martha (Tess Harper), has turned to alcohol while his father, Mark (Raymond J. Barry), is seeing a woman called Glory (Karen Allen). Cliff also has an awkward reunion with his ex-girlfriend, April (Gillian Anderson).

Desperate to bring his parents back together, Cliff poses as a delivery driver to gain entry to Glory's house. Inside, he reveals his true identity and threatens Glory, calling her a "homewrecker" and ordering her to break off her relationship with his father. During this confrontation, it becomes clear that Cliff has formed white supremacist and neo-Nazi views. Disturbed by Cliff's actions, Mark disowns him.

Later, Cliff breaks into Glory's house while Mark is present and holds Glory at knifepoint, threatening to hurt her unless Mark – to whom he passes Glory's gun – shoots him first. Unable to kill his son, Mark fires into the wall behind Cliff and Glory. Glory seizes the gun and aims it at Cliff but Mark dissuades her from shooting him. Mark forces Cliff to drop the knife and tells him that he must learn to live with the pain of his parents' divorce. Mark and Cliff leave the house together.

== Cast ==
- Karen Allen as Gloria "Glory" Lawson
- Raymond J. Barry as Mark Harnish
- Michael Dolan as Clifford "Cliff" Harnish
- Tess Harper as Martha Harnish
- Gillian Anderson as April Cavanaugh
- Michael P. Moran as Jim McCutcheon
- Jim Simmons as Mayor
- Madison Arnold as Mr. Cavanaugh
- Tannis Benedict as Vivian Sinott
- John Newton as Mr. Creasy

== Production ==
Filming took place in November 1991. Shooting locations included Pocahontas and Abbs Valley in Tazewell County, Virginia, as well as Nemours, West Virginia.

== Critical response ==
Michael Dolan has described the film as "not very good ... My agent saw [it] and wouldn't talk to me for months."

Reviewing The Turning at the time of its original 1992 release, David Stratton of Variety commented that the film "still smacks of the theater. Though it packs an undeniable emotional punch, [it] comes across as overwritten and contrived as a cinema experience." He described the ending as "an anticlimax, since the audience has been led to anticipate an act of cathartic violence that never occurs." However, he praised Dolan's "genuinely scary character" as well as the "strong performances" of the other cast members. Ray Pride of the Chicago Reader wrote that despite its "pictorial and emotional strengths", the film is "too rooted in its theatrical origins to be truly memorable." He also criticised the film for its characters' "unconvincing" insights and its "distracting" musical score.

In 1997, Kevin Thomas of the Los Angeles Times gave the film a negative review, writing that "at every turn, The Turning is ridiculously vague. We get no real idea of what Martha and Mark did – or what happened to Cliff during his absence – that has turned him into a psychopath clutching madly at 'traditional family values.'" He also commented that Puopolo "directs his cast as if they were giving a stage performance, which means that the realism of the film's location not only ensures the artificiality of the entire endeavor but also shows up the many flaws in the basic material as well." In a negative review of the home video release, Dave Nuttycombe of the Washington City Paper called the film a "tiredly talky Southern Gothic drama".

=== Controversy ===
The film features a sex scene between Dolan and Anderson's characters. After the film was bought by British film distributor David Lewis in 1996, his company Unique Films released it on home video nationwide. By then appearing in the TV series The X-Files, Anderson hired lawyers in an attempt to stop the film's release. The British tabloid press, which described the film as a "B movie", reported that Anderson had tried to buy it back for "large sums of money" without success. They described the scene as "semi-topless". According to Dolan, the scene was shot at 4 A.M. after a long day and both he and Anderson were exhausted.

Anderson had a clause in her contract stating that her breasts could not be exposed in any scenes. Despite the controversy, the Orange County Register judged the scene to be "fleeting" and argued that the film "deserves better than to serve as a salacious footnote to a television show." Nuttycombe called the scene "gratuitous" and "irrelevant".

In 2002, Keith Phipps of The A.V. Club, who described The Turning as an "unconvincing melodrama", argued that the film had been re-released purely for the "one brief love scene featuring Anderson, much tamer than the video box's lurid cover would suggest."

== See also ==
- List of films featuring home invasions
