= John Lincoln =

John Lincoln may refer to:

- John Lincoln (judge) (1916–2011), Australian judge
- John C. Lincoln (1866–1959), American inventor, entrepreneur, and philanthropist
- John Lincoln (politician) (born 1981), member of the Alaska House of Representatives
- John Lincoln Williams (born 1961), Welsh author, who also used John Lincoln as a pen name

== See also ==
- John J. Lincoln House, historic building in Elkhorn, West Virginia.
