= Route 102 (Virginia–West Virginia) =

Adjoining state highways in Virginia and West Virginia, US

Virginia State Route 102 and West Virginia Route 102
- Route 102 highlighted in red

Route information
- Maintained by VDOT and WVDOH
- Length: 11.4 mi (18.3 km)

Virginia
- Length: 8.20 mi (13.20 km) 3 sections; both overall termini are in Virginia
- West end: SR 1103 in Pocahontas
- Major intersections: WV 102; US 19 in Bluefield
- East end: Stadium Drive in Bluefield

West Virginia
- Length: 3.2 mi (5.1 km) 2 sections
- Major intersections: SR 102

Location
- Country: United States
- States: Virginia, West Virginia
- Counties: VA: Tazewell WV: Mercer

Highway system
- Virginia Routes; Interstate; US; Primary; Secondary; Byways; History; HOT lanes
- West Virginia State Highway System; Interstate; US; State
← SR 101	Virginia	→ SR 103
← WV 101	West Virginia	→ WV 103

Virginia State Route 102 (SR 102) and West Virginia Route 102 (WV 102) are adjoining state highways in the U.S. states of Virginia and West Virginia. The two state highways together run 11.4 miles (18.3 km) from Center Street in Pocahontas, Virginia east to the Virginia – West Virginia state line between the twin cities of Bluefield, Virginia and Bluefield, West Virginia. Most of Route 102 consists of three sections in Virginia maintained by the Virginia Department of Transportation (VDOT); the two intervening sections in West Virginia are maintained by the West Virginia Division of Highways. In addition to connecting Pocahontas with the two Bluefields, the state highway passes through Nemours, West Virginia and Falls Mills, Virginia and provides access to Bluefield College.

== Route description ==
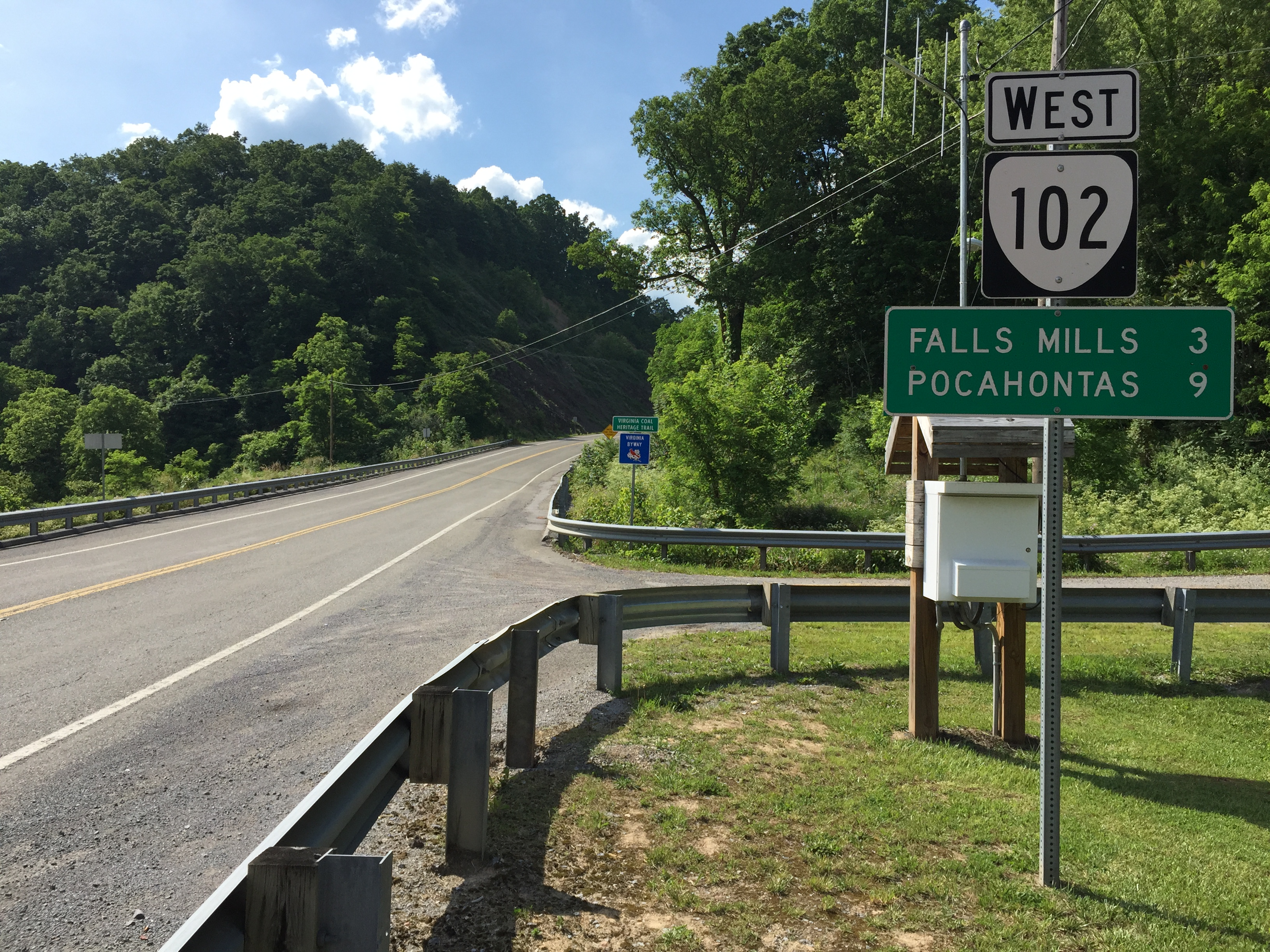
View west along SR 102 just northwest of Bluefield, Virginia

Route 102 begins at the north end of Center Street (SR 1103) in the town of Pocahontas on the Virginia side of the state line. Center Street leads to SR 659 (Water Street), which leads to the Pocahontas Exhibition Coal Mine. Route 102 intersects an old railroad grade and parallels Laurel Fork out of the town of Pocahontas. After spending 0.85 miles (1.37 km) in Virginia, the state highway has its first crossing of the state line. Route 102 passes through West Virginia for 0.2 miles (0.32 km), then loops through Virginia for another 0.20 miles (0.32 km). The state highway re-enters West Virginia at the hamlet of Wolfe. Route 102 follows Laurel Fork north to its confluence with the Bluestone River. The highway parallels the river and Norfolk Southern Railway's Pocahontas District southeast through the communities of Bluestone and Nemours. After 3.0 miles (4.8 km) in West Virginia, Route 102 has its final crossing of the state line at the hamlet of Yards, which is adjacent to a rail yard.

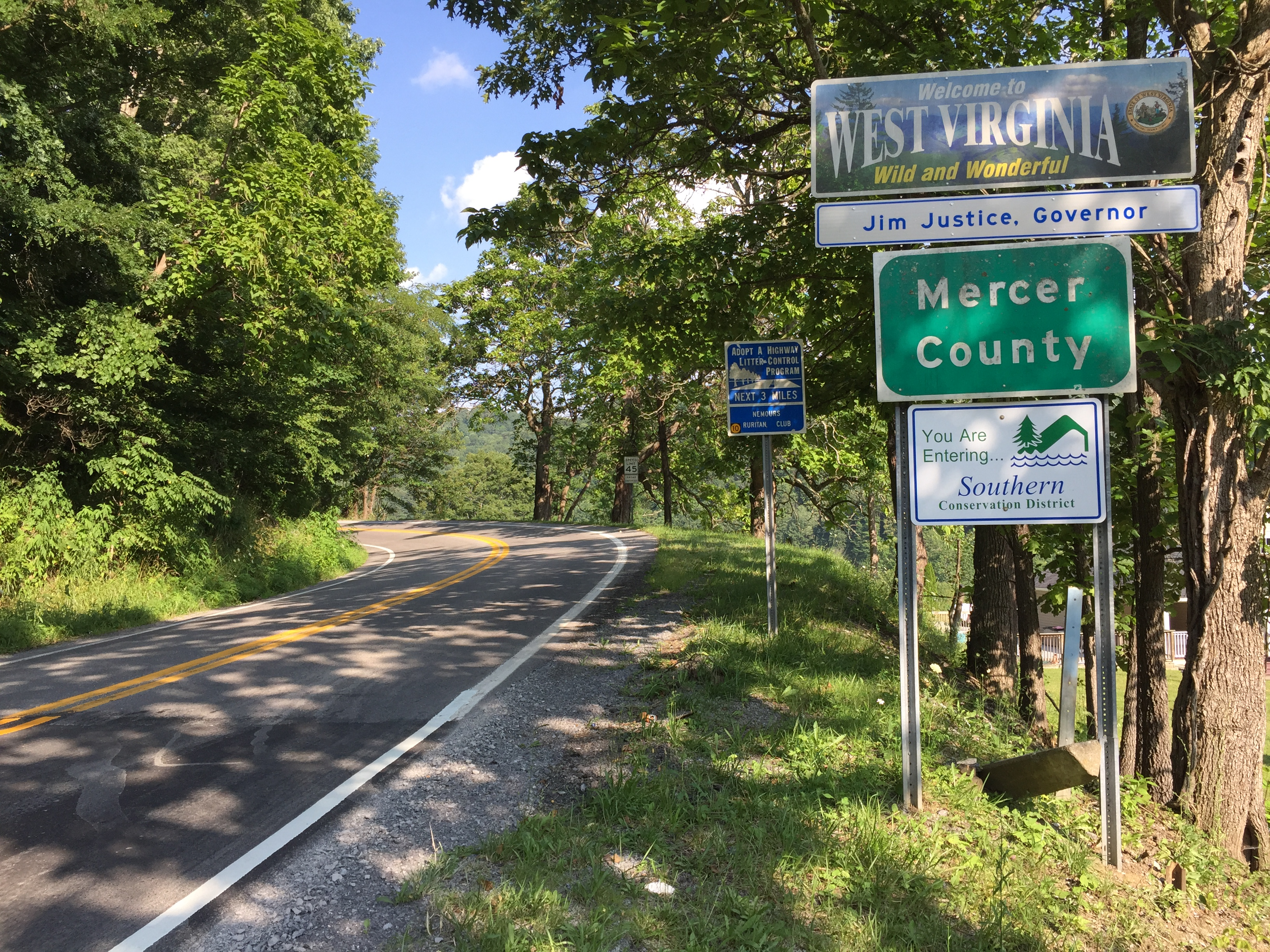
View west along Route 102 as it crosses into West Virginia

Route 102 continues south along the Bluestone River and Pocahontas District rail line through Falls Mills to the Virginia town of Bluefield, where the highway's name becomes College Avenue. The highway passes under the Pocahontas District rail line just east of its junction with the Clinch Valley District and enters downtown Bluefield, where the highway intersects US 19 (Virginia Avenue). Route 102 heads south through a pair of ridges to SR 720 (Valleydale Street), which heads south toward a partial cloverleaf interchange with US 460. Route 102 heads east through the campus of Bluefield College. Just before College Avenue crosses the state line into Bluefield, West Virginia, the state highway turns north onto Stadium Drive and passes Bluefield City Park. The park contains Bowen Field, which was the home of the Bluefield Blue Jays minor league baseball team and the Bluefield College baseball team, and Mitchell Stadium, which hosts high school and Bluefield College football games. Route 102 reaches its eastern terminus at the state line—and the boundary between the two Bluefields—next to the stadium parking lots. The eastern segment of the highway in Virginia has a length of 7.15 miles (11.51 km).

== History ==
WV 102 formerly re-entered West Virginia west of Pocahontas along SR 659 (Exhibition Coal Mine Road). WV 102's western section followed what is now County Route 84, WV 161, and WV 103 to Welch. The western section of WV 102 was eliminated sometime between 1976 and 1980, at which point WV 103 gained its current number.

A new highway project is being crafted that would bypass the section of Route 102 running through Pocahontas and weaving in and out of Virginia and West Virginia. The new route, beginning in Abb's Valley, would reconnect with Route 102 in Falls Mills, and provide an entire route that would only run in Virginia.

== Major intersections ==
County	Location	mi	km	Destinations	Notes
Tazewell	Pocahontas	0.00	0.00	SR 1103 (Center Street) / West Railroad Avenue	Western terminus
Tazewell				SR 644 – Bramwell	to CR 120
		0.85 0.0	1.37 0.0	Virginia – West Virginia state line	
		0.2 0.00	0.32 0.00	West Virginia – Virginia state line	
		0.20 0.0	0.32 0.0	Virginia – West Virginia state line	
		3.0 0.00	4.8 0.00	West Virginia – Virginia state line	
Tazewell	Falls Mills	2.11	3.40	SR 643 to WV 123 / US 52	
Tazewell	Bluefield	4.71	7.58	US 19 (Virginia Avenue) to US 460	
Tazewell	Bluefield	5.89	9.48	SR 720 west (Valleydale Street) to US 460 / I-77 – Tazewell, Princeton	
Tazewell	Bluefield	6.76	10.88	College Avenue	SR 102 turns from College Avenue onto Stadium Drive
Tazewell	Bluefield	7.15	11.51	Stadium Drive – Bluefield, WV	West Virginia state line; eastern terminus
1.000 mi = 1.609 km; 1.000 km = 0.621 mi

< SR 116	Spurs of SR 11; 1923–1928	SR 118 >
< SR 127	District 1 State Routes; 1928–1933	SR 129 >
