= Shawnee Expressway =

Shawnee Expressway may refer to:

- Shawnee Expressway (Kentucky)
- Shawnee Expressway (West Virginia)
