= West Virginia Route 108 =

State highway in Mercer County, West Virginia, United States

West Virginia Route 108
- King Coal Highway
- WV 108 highlighted in red

Route information
- Maintained by WVDOH
- Existed: December 13, 2023–present

Major junctions
- South end: US 52 / US 460 near Bluefield
- North end: WV 123 near Bluefield

Location
- Country: United States
- State: West Virginia

Highway system
- West Virginia State Highway System; Interstate; US; State
← WV 107	→ WV 112

West Virginia Route 108 is the designation given to a highway currently open that is intended to be a part of Interstate 73 (I-73) and I-74. The first section opened near Bluefield. The state started this route in 2007, but the West Virginia Department of Transportation (WVDOT) did not have the funding to connect it to other roadways. This delayed opening to traffic until 2023.

== Route description ==
WV 108 is a four-lane divided freeway up until Christine West Bridge; lanes on each side are currently being constructed so that the freeway will extend to Airport Road. WV 108 currently goes from US 52 and US 460 to WV 123 (Airport Road).

== History ==
The King Coal Highway is thought to be intended to open West Virginia’s southern coalfields to economic development, so in the early 1990s, the West Virginia Department of Transportation (WVDOT) decided to start construction on a segment from US 52 and US 460 (John Nash Boulevard) to WV 123 (Airport Road). Construction started sometime in the 1990s, but due to a lack of funding, WVDOT had to wait until funding was available. In 2018, Gov. Jim Justice revitalized the project and brought back funding. On December 13, 2023, the section was complete and was opened to traffic after a ceremony.

On February 20, 2024, people learned about the next segment of WV 108 from WV 123 (Airport Road) to WV 20 near Littlesburg Road.

On November 4, 2024, Gov. Justice broke ground for the extension of WV 108, from Airport Road to Littesburg Road.

Sometime in March, 2025, trees were being cut down to make way for the extension from Airport Road to Littlesburg Road.

== Future ==
WV 108 is planned to run from WV 65 and Corridor G (US 119) near Belo, to I-77 at its US 52 interchange near Bluefield. The Coalfields Expressway (US 121) and the Shawnee Expressway will connect to the King Coal Highway.

The West Virginia Division of Highways (WVDOH) announced an extension towards Littlesburg Road and are planning to start construction in 2025. The extension is 2.4 miles (3.9 km) long, and before WVDOH will have to make a bridge over Littlesburg Road they will stop construction, and continue it after the next extension. The extension will be built four lanes. The extension from Littlesburg Road to Montcalm is in planning stages.

WV 108 is currently a four-lane freeway up until the Christine West Bridge; after the bridge it turns into a two-lane highway. Construction is underway to turn it four lanes to WV 123 (Airport Road).

When it's finished, it will be part of Future US 52 / Future Interstate 73.

== Exit list ==
The entire route is in Bluefield, Mercer County.

mi	km	Exit	Destinations	Notes
0.00	0.00	—	US 52 / US 460 – Bluefield	Opened in December 2023
		—	WV 123 (Airport Road)	Opened in December 2023; completed interchange starts construction in 2025
		—	WV 20 (Littlesburg Road)	Construction to start in mid-to-late 2025
1.000 mi = 1.609 km; 1.000 km = 0.621 mi: Incomplete access; Unopened
