= New River Parkway =

West Virginia Route 125
- New River Parkway

Route information
- Maintained by West Virginia Division of Highways
- Length: 10.0 mi (16.1 km)

Major junctions
- South end: WV 20 near Hinton
- North end: I-64 in Sandstone

Location
- Country: United States
- State: West Virginia

Highway system
- West Virginia State Highway System; Interstate; US; State
← WV 123	→ WV 127

The New River Parkway, planned to be West Virginia Route 125, is a proposed road that will run alongside the New River in Summers and Raleigh Counties in southern West Virginia. The parkway's planned route will run 10 miles (16 km) from West Virginia Route 20 near Hinton to Interstate 64 at Sandstone; an extension from Hinton to Princeton has also been proposed. As of 2018, construction has only been completed on a segment of the route north of Hinton.

The West Virginia Legislature approved the parkway in 1985, and plans for its route were proposed in 1991. The route between Hinton and Sandstone was finalized in 1998, but a controversy of the buying of land for the highway stalled its construction. In 2011, construction began on the first piece of the route, a 1.3-mile (2.1 km) segment north of Hinton; another segment to the north of the first is under construction as of October 2017.

== Route description ==
Three segments of the route have been planned, running for a combined 10 miles (16 km) along the New River in Summers and Raleigh Counties. The first section, which has been built, spans 1.3 miles (2.1 km) from West Virginia Route 20 near Hinton north along River Road; the second and third sections continue along the New River into Raleigh County before crossing the river into Summers County at Sandstone, terminating at Interstate 64. According to the New River Turnpike Authority's long-term plans for the highway, it will ultimately reach south from Hinton to the West Virginia Turnpike in Princeton, though a route south of Hinton has not yet been developed.

== History ==
The Hinton Chamber of Commerce and Jim Carrico, then superintendent of the New River Gorge National River, initially proposed the parkway in the early 1980s to establish a scenic highway along the New River to Sandstone Falls. Planning for the highway begin in 1985 when the West Virginia Legislature authorized the road and established the New River Parkway Authority. The highway was funded in 1987, and the West Virginia Division of Highways released the first plans for the route in 1991. Environmental concerns stalled the project through the 1990s, but in 1998 the Parkway Authority finalized a route along County Route 26. The plans became contentious, however, when local residents learned that all private property between the route and the river would be claimed for the parkway by eminent domain. After a 1999 public hearing, the Division of Highways opted to change the buyout plan in the face of public opposition.

On August 10, 2011, the Division of Highways broke ground on construction of the first segment of the highway north of Hinton. The initial section is being built by Triton Construction of Nitro and is expected to cost $11.32 million. A second section north of the first is being designed and is expected to cost $22 million; the third portion of the parkway, which would complete the route to Sandstone, has not been designed. The Parkway Authority plans to build another part of the route between Hinton and Princeton, though the route of this section has not been planned.
