= Falls Mills, Virginia =

- Census-designated place
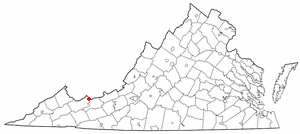
- Location in the Commonwealth of Virginia
- Coordinates: 37°27′56″N 81°31′14″W
- Country: United States
- State: Virginia
- County: Tazewell

Area
  - Total: 0.89 sq mi (2.3 km^{2})
  - Land: 0.878 sq mi (2.27 km^{2})
  - Water: 0.012 sq mi (0.031 km^{2}) 1.348%
- Elevation: 2,858.00 ft (871.118 m)

Population (2020)
  - Total: 305
- Time zone: UTC-5 (EST)
  - Summer (DST): UTC-4 (EDT)
- ZIP code: 24613
- Area code: 276

Falls Mills is an unincorporated community and census-designated place along Virginia State Route 102 in Tazewell County, Virginia, United States and is located at the mouth of the valley of Mud Fork creek. As of the 2020 census, Falls Mills had a population of 305. It is part of the Bluefield, WV-VA micropolitan area, which has a population of 107,578.

== History ==
Falls Mills received its name from a mill there, located at a natural dam in the Bluestone River. Another dam, built by Norfolk and Western Railroad across Mud Fork creek, reaches twenty feet high and spans several hundred feet to form a lake more than a mile long. Through the mid- to late 1900s the lake was a summer resort area with boating, fishing and cabins. Residents still enjoy fishing in the lake, which is maintained and stocked by the Falls Mills Fishing Club.

Perhaps the most notable event to occur there is known as the Engagement at Falls Mills. On July 20, 1863 at dawn, the Confederate cavalry of Major Andrew J. May surprised a Union raiding party led by Lt. Col Freeman E. Franklin. The Union cavalry was chased from its bivouac in nearby Brown's Meadow, where it was preparing to burn the Falls Mill, and fled north toward Abbs Valley. Brigadier General John Stuart Williams' Confederate cavalry struck the Union raiders as they withdrew up the valley, causing them to abandon captured livestock and slaves.

Falls Mills' population was 300 in 1940.

== Demographics ==
Historical population
Census	Pop.	Note	%±
U.S. Decennial Census; 2010

Falls Mills first appeared as a census designated place in the 2020 U.S. census.
