= West Virginia Route 103 =

State highway in McDowell County, West Virginia, United States

West Virginia Route 103

Route information
- Maintained by WVDOH
- Length: 11.1 mi (17.9 km)

Major junctions
- West end: US 52 / WV 16 near Welch
- East end: WV 161 near Pageton

Location
- Country: United States
- State: West Virginia
- Counties: McDowell

Highway system
- West Virginia State Highway System; Interstate; US; State
← WV 102	→ WV 104

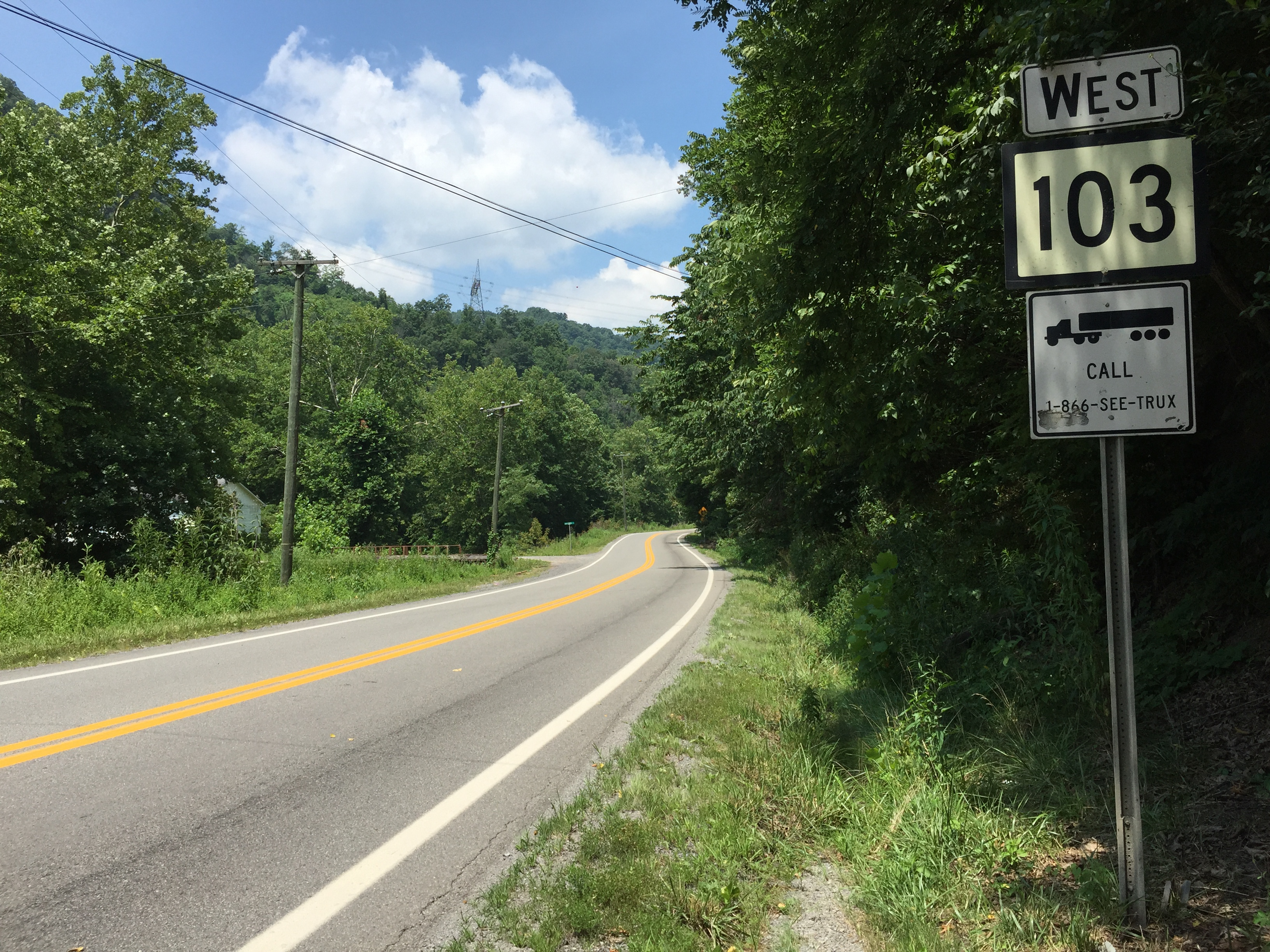
View west along WV 103 at WV 161 near Pageton

West Virginia Route 103 is an east-west state highway located in McDowell County, West Virginia. The eastern terminus of the route is at West Virginia Route 161 southwest of Pageton. The western terminus is at U.S. Route 52 and West Virginia Route 16 in southern Welch.

WV 103 was formerly part of West Virginia Route 102, which previously reentered West Virginia from Tazewell County, Virginia. WV 102 ran along the route of County Route 84, WV 161, and WV 103 into Welch. Sometime between 1976 and 1980, the western section of WV 102 was eliminated and WV 103 gained its current number.

== Major intersections ==
The entire route is in McDowell County.

Location	mi	km	Destinations	Notes
Welch			US 52 / WV 16	
			WV 161 – Anawalt	
1.000 mi = 1.609 km; 1.000 km = 0.621 mi
