= Green Valley, Mercer County, West Virginia =

Green Valley, West Virginia
- Unincorporated community
- Location within the state of West Virginia Green Valley, West Virginia (the United States)
- Coordinates: 37°18′40″N 81°08′21″W
- Country: United States
- State: West Virginia
- County: Mercer
- Elevation: 2,431 ft (741 m)
- Time zone: UTC-5 (Eastern (EST))
  - Summer (DST): UTC-4 (EDT)
- Area codes: 304 & 681
- GNIS feature ID: 1554605

Green Valley is an unincorporated community in Mercer County, West Virginia, United States. Green Valley is located along West Virginia Route 123, 4.5 miles (7.2 km) north-northeast of Bluefield.
