= Angie Turner King =

American chemist, mathematician, and educator

- Born: Angie Lena Turner; December 9, 1905; Elkhorn, West Virginia, U.S.
- Died: February 28, 2004 (aged 98); Institute, West Virginia, U.S.
- Education: Bluefield Colored Institute; West Virginia State College; Cornell University; University of Pittsburgh
- Spouse: Robert Elemore King
- Children: 5
- Scientific career
- Fields: Chemistry; Mathematics
- Workplaces: West Virginia State High School; West Virginia State College
- Notable students: Margaret Strickland Collins; Jasper Brown Jeffries (Manhattan Project); Katherine Johnson

Angie Lena Turner King (December 9, 1905 – February 28, 2004) was an American chemist, mathematician, and educator. King was an instructor of chemistry and mathematics at West Virginia State High School, and a professor of chemistry and mathematics at West Virginia State College (present-day West Virginia State University) in Institute.

Born in the segregated coal-mining community of Elkhorn in McDowell County, West Virginia, in 1905, she had a difficult childhood following her mother's death when she was eight years old. King graduated from the laboratory high school at West Virginia Colored Institute at age 14 in 1919, and studied at Bluefield Colored Institute (present-day Bluefield State University) before transferring to West Virginia State (then known as the West Virginia Collegiate Institute). She graduated cum laude from West Virginia State in 1927 with a Bachelor of Science degree in chemistry and mathematics. King began her career in education at West Virginia State High School, West Virginia State's laboratory high school; she attended graduate school during the summers at Cornell University, where she received a master's degree in physical chemistry in 1931.

After teaching high school for eight years, King became an associate professor at West Virginia State College and refurbished its laboratory to improve the quality of her students' scientific research. Following the outbreak of World War II, she taught chemistry to soldiers in West Virginia State's Army Specialized Training Program (ASTP) unit. King later attended the University of Pittsburgh, where she became a Doctor of Philosophy in general education in 1955. She mentored several notable students, including entomologist and activist Margaret Strickland Collins, mathematician Katherine Johnson, and Jasper Brown Jeffries of the Manhattan Project. King chaired West Virginia State College's Division of Natural Resources and Mathematics before retiring from the college in 1980. She continued to live on the West Virginia State campus after her retirement, and in 1992 the school presented her with an honorary Doctor of Laws degree.

== Early life and education ==
Angie Lena Turner King (née Turner) was born in the segregated coal-mining community of Elkhorn in McDowell County, West Virginia, on December 9, 1905. She was the daughter of William Turner and his wife, Laura King Turner, who were from Virginia. King had two siblings: Sylvia and Irving. She was the grandchild of Virginia slaves, who were provided with land, a steer, and a log cabin after their emancipation. She had a difficult childhood; her mother died when she was eight and she was sent to live with her light-skinned maternal grandmother, who referred to her with a pejorative term because of her darker skin tone. King eventually lived with her father, who was illiterate and encouraged her to do well at school; her father died on November 8, 1927, after he was run over by a mining car.

She graduated from high school at age 14 in 1919. Because of King's good grades in high school, her teachers encouraged her to go to college. She attended Bluefield Colored Institute (present-day Bluefield State University) in Bluefield before transferring to West Virginia Collegiate Institute (present-day West Virginia State University) in Institute. King worked at a number of jobs, including waitressing and dishwashing, as a student to pay her tuition and expenses. In 1927, she graduated cum laude from West Virginia State, with a Bachelor of Science degree in chemistry and mathematics. When King graduated, her hometown was listed as Eckman.

== Career ==
King began her career in education as an instructor in chemistry and mathematics at West Virginia State High School, West Virginia State's laboratory high school. During the summers, she attended Cornell University and paid her own tuition. King's thesis in chemistry at Cornell was entitled "The Interaction Between Solutions of Tannic Acid and Hydrous Ferric Oxide." She received a master's degree in physical chemistry from Cornell in 1931. King was active in student activities and directed the high-school play, "The Ghost Parade" by Katharine Kavanaugh, in 1935. She taught at West Virginia State High School for eight years, until she was offered a teaching position as an associate professor at West Virginia State College. King immediately refurbished her laboratory to ensure that her students knew "what a real laboratory was like." She continued supporting student activities as a professor, and was the faculty sponsor for West Virginia State's Nu chapter of the Alpha Kappa Alpha sorority. During the summer of 1939, King completed graduate coursework in education at the University of Chicago.

After the outbreak of World War II, West Virginia State received an Army Specialized Training Program (ASTP) unit in 1943 and 1944. King, one of West Virginia State's instructors for the ASTP soldiers, taught chemistry. The ASTP was established in response to a concern that the war would result in a shortage of college graduates needed as military officers after the war. West Virginia State was one of six historically black colleges and universities which received an ASTP unit.

King attended the University of Pittsburgh during the early 1950s, becoming a Doctor of Philosophy in general education in 1955. Her dissertation was entitled An Analysis of Early Algebra Textbooks Used in American Secondary Schools before 1900. King's master's thesis and doctoral dissertation were her only published research.

While teaching at West Virginia State High School and West Virginia State College, King mentored entomologist and activist Margaret Strickland Collins, mathematician Katherine Johnson (a subject of Hidden Figures), and Jasper Brown Jeffries of the Manhattan Project. In the West Virginia State High School Reunion Booklet, 27 former students chose King as their favorite teacher; at least 20 of those students finished graduate school. Katherine Johnson cited her as an influence in high school and college, and described King as "a wonderful teacher—bright, caring, and very rigorous." King taught Johnson geometry in high school and mathematics in college, and continued to encourage Johnson in her mathematics studies.

== Later life and death ==
By 1969, King chaired West Virginia State College's Division of Natural Resources and Mathematics. During the 1970s, she traveled to Africa to visit Presbyterian missions and to obtain information on the status of women in Zaire, Kenya, and Ethiopia; she made a presentation on "The Status of Women in East Africa" to the Lewisburg branch of the American Association of University Women in 1974. King chaired the West Virginia Governor's Commission on the Status of Women, and spoke with Gloria Steinem at a conference on Appalachian women at Morris Harvey College in 1975. She retired from West Virginia State in 1980, and continued to live on campus after her retirement. In 1992, the school awarded King an honorary Doctor of Laws degree. She died in Institute on February 28, 2004.

== Personal life ==
=== Marriage and family ===
King married Robert Elemore King on June 9, 1946, in Institute. She and her husband had five daughters, whom King raised while working and continuing her postgraduate studies. Robert died in 1958.

=== Affiliations and awards ===
King edited the West Virginia State College Alumni Bulletin, a bimonthly periodical of West Virginia State's alumni association. In 1954, she was the first West Virginia State Alumna of the Year. King was a member of the American Association of University Women, serving as second vice president and president of the West Virginia division. She was the vice- president of the central region of the Beta Kappa Chi honor society, and became editor-in-chief of the Beta Kappa Chi Bulletin in 1962. In 1966, Beta Kappa Chi presented King the society's Distinguished Service Award. She was a member of the American Chemical Society, the West Virginia Academy of Science, and the American Association of University Professors. In 1972, King was elected to the executive board of the West Virginia Coalition for Clean Air. She was a member-at-large of the World Missions Chairmen's Association of the Presbyterian Church in the United States, an ecumenical mission and relations chairperson of the Guyandotte Presbyterian Church, and an elder of Dunbar Presbyterian Church.

King was a charter member of the Alpha Omicron Omega chapter of the Alpha Kappa Alpha sorority, which was organized in October 1929 at Institute and chartered on November 7 of that year. The chapter was founded as a graduate chapter of Alpha Kappa Alpha in the Charleston-Institute area. She was president of the Alpha Omicron Omega chapter from 1935 to 1937, and was honored by Alpha Kappa Alpha with a sorority citation in 1968.

== Bibliography ==
- Brown, Jeannette E. (2012). African American Women Chemists. New York: Oxford University Press. ISBN 9780199742882. OCLC 1162001393. Archived from the original on September 18, 2020 – via Google Books.
- Carper, Isaac M., ed. (1940). Biennial Report of the Bureau of Negro Welfare and Statistics of the State of West Virginia, 1939–40. Charleston, West Virginia: Jarrett Printing Company. Archived from the original on September 18, 2020 – via HathiTrust.
- Danky, James P.; Hady, Maureen E., eds. (1998). African-American Newspapers and Periodicals: A National Bibliography. Cambridge, Massachusetts: Harvard University Press. ISBN 9780674007888. LCCN 98026099. OCLC 231774980 – via Internet Archive.
- Ferguson, G. E., ed. (1932). Report of the Bureau of Negro Welfare and Statistics of the State of West Virginia, 1929–1932. Charleston, West Virginia: Jarrett Printing Company. Archived from the original on September 18, 2020 – via HathiTrust.
- Houston, Johnny L. (March 2019). "The Life and Pioneering Contributions of an African American Centenarian Mathematician Katherine G. Johnson" (PDF). Notices of the American Mathematical Society. 66. Providence, Rhode Island: American Mathematical Society: 324–329. doi:10.1090/noti1809. ISSN 1088-9477.
- Keefer, Louis E. (1994). "On the Homefront in World War II: Soldier-Scholars at West Virginia State College". West Virginia History. 53. Charleston, West Virginia: West Virginia Archives and History, West Virginia Department of Arts, Culture and History: 119–132. Archived from the original on March 1, 2020.
- King, Angie Turner (1955). An Analysis of Early Algebra Textbooks Used in American Secondary Schools before 1900. Pittsburgh: University of Pittsburgh. OCLC 18736980.
- Turner, Angie Lena (1931). The Interaction Between Solutions of Tannic Acid and Hydrous Ferric Oxide. Ithaca, New York: Cornell University. OCLC 63226450.
- Warren, Wini (1999). Black Women Scientists in the United States. Bloomington, Indiana: Indiana University Press. ISBN 0253336031. OCLC 1050065113 – via Internet Archive.
- West Virginia Collegiate Institute (June 1927). West Virginia Collegiate Institute Commencement (PDF). Institute, West Virginia: West Virginia Collegiate Institute – via Drain-Jordan Library, West Virginia State University.
- West Virginia State College (December 20, 1998). West Virginia State College Mid-Year Commencement (PDF). Institute, West Virginia: West Virginia State College Communications Services – via Drain-Jordan Library, West Virginia State University.
