= Liberace: Behind the Music =

- DVD cover
- Genre: Biography; Drama; Music
- Written by: Gavin Lambert
- Directed by: David Greene
- Starring: Victor Garber; Saul Rubinek; Michael Dolan; Maureen Stapleton
- Music by: Hagood Hardy
- Countries of origin: Canada; United States
- Original language: English

Production
- Executive producers: Linda Yellen; Nancy Bein
- Producer: Murray Shostak
- Production location: Montreal
- Cinematography: René Verzier
- Editor: Yves Langlois
- Running time: 97 minutes
- Production company: The Kushner-Locke Company

Original release
- Network: CBS
- Release: October 9, 1988

Liberace: Behind the Music is a 1988 Canadian-American made-for-television biographical film. It is an "unofficial" biopic drama on the life and death of Władziu Valentino Liberace, who went from a humble working-class background to become a famous American pianist and vocalist. Known as "Liberace", he became the highest paid entertainer in the world, while embracing a lifestyle of flamboyant excess. The film first aired less than two years after his death, in the United States, as a CBS Sunday Movie.

== Description ==
The modest-length production (97 minutes) traces Liberace's life, as played by Canadian actor Victor Garber, from his humble beginnings in a Milwaukee suburb, through his major life highs and lows, culminating with the highly publicized palimony lawsuit filed against him by his former limo driver and alleged live-in boyfriend of five years, Scott Thorson (played by Michael Dolan), and his failing health, ending with his death at age 67 on February 4, 1987, from AIDS complications.

The film highlighted an early casting appearance of then 20-year-old Shawn Levy as Glenn, a post-Thorson acquaintance of Liberace's through the pianist's final days.

The film was directed by Emmy Award-winning David Greene. Credit for technical advisor is given to long-time Liberace friend and agent Seymour Heller (portrayed in the film by Saul Rubinek).

Film clips from Liberace's actual stage appearances are interspersed in the storyline.

Liberace: Behind the Music was broadcast one week after the ABC biopic production Liberace (1988), starring Andrew Robinson in the lead, and with a script holding to a point of view that Liberace was heterosexual. Liberace: Behind the Music, however, acknowledged his homosexuality.

== Plot ==
Wladiziu Valentino Liberace, a gifted classical pianist fueled by poverty, was already playing with the Chicago Symphony Orchestra at the age of 17. Through a variety of his highs and lows, chaptered in TV-style format, Liberace's life from his early years through his death are chronicled with the struggle of keeping his sexuality hidden from the public.

== Cast ==
- Victor Garber as Liberace
- Saul Rubinek as Seymour Heller
- Michael Dolan as Scott Thorson
- Maureen Stapleton as Frances Liberace
- Shawn Levy as Glenn
- Michael Wilkes as George Liberace
- Macha Grenon as Joanne
- George Touliatos as Salvatore Liberace
- Joan Heney as Serious Lady
- Andrew Nichols as Teenager
- Paul Hipp as Elvis Presley
- Frances Hyland as Florence Bettray Kelly
- Stephen Watts as Jimmy
- Louis Giambalvo as Eddie
- Rochelle Bruneau as George's Girl

== Home media ==
Liberace: Behind the Music is available on DVD from Kushner-Locke, distributed through Tango Entertainment.

== See also ==
- Behind the Candelabra, another biopic, stars Michael Douglas as Liberace and Matt Damon as Thorson; it aired on the HBO television network on May 26, 2013.
