= Prichard, West Virginia =

- Census-designated place (CDP)
- Location within West Virginia
- Coordinates: 38°14′24″N 82°35′55″W
- Country: United States
- State: West Virginia
- County: Wayne

Area
  - Total: 1.263 sq mi (3.27 km^{2})
  - Land: 1.107 sq mi (2.87 km^{2})
  - Water: 0.156 sq mi (0.40 km^{2})
- Elevation: 587 ft (179 m)

Population (2020)
  - Total: 461
  - Density: 416/sq mi (161/km^{2})
- Time zone: UTC-5 (Eastern (EST))
  - Summer (DST): UTC-4 (EDT)
- ZIP Code: 25555
- Area codes: 304 and 681
- GNIS feature ID: 1555412

Prichard is a census-designated place (CDP) in Wayne County, West Virginia, United States. As of the 2020 census, its population was 461. It is located along the Big Sandy River and U.S. Route 52. It is part of the Huntington–Ashland, WV–KY–OH, Metropolitan Statistical Area (MSA), which had a population of 287,702 according to the US Census (2010). The community was named after James Pritchard.

== Education ==
Prichard Elementary School opened in 1958, replacing a two-room schoolhouse. It is the lone academic facility in Prichard. Once students reach sixth grade, they attend either Buffalo Middle School, Wayne Middle School, or Fort Gay Middle School. Upon reaching ninth grade, Prichard residents attend either Spring Valley High School, Wayne High School or Tolsia High School.

== Economy ==
With only a limited number of employment opportunities within Prichard, the average work commute for residents was 38.7 minutes.

In September 1999, Senator Jay Rockefeller announced that Okuno International would open a hydraulic cylinder plant in Prichard, offering 50 new jobs and eventually expanding to 100.

Aplicare, a manufacturer of topical antiseptic and personal care products, operated a 35,000-square-foot (3,300 m^{2}) facility which, according to their website, manufactured “all of our bottled antiseptics, our personal care product line, and several unit dose products including lubricating jelly and antiseptic hand gel. This facility closed in 2018”

In 2003, Allevard opened a coil spring and stabilizer bar plant in Prichard originally employing approximately 90 people. In May 2008, Allevard announced plans to expand employment to approximately 150 people, but in 2009, due to the slumping economy, had to instead reduce its staff to about 40.

In January 2008, construction began on the Heartland Corridor, a train route of the Norfolk Southern Railway that leads from the Virginia coast to Columbus, Ohio. The corridor offers existing lines the ability to carry more cargo by double-stacking boxcars. An intermodal facility was placed in Prichard, to allow for the cars to be easily transferred between rail, highway, waterway, and airway transportation. The $35 million intermodal facility opened in 2015, but with disappointing expectations. The West Virginia Port Authority put the facility up for auction in 2020 after losing a half million dollars a year.

== Government ==
As an unincorporated community, Prichard has no city government. Law enforcement is provided from the county and state levels.
