= West Virginia Route 161 =

State highway in West Virginia, United States

West Virginia Route 161

Route information
- Maintained by WVDOH
- Length: 20.6 mi (33.2 km)

Major junctions
- South end: WV 16 in Bishop
- WV 103 near Black Wolf
- North end: US 52 in Elkhorn

Location
- Country: United States
- State: West Virginia
- Counties: McDowell

Highway system
- West Virginia State Highway System; Interstate; US; State
← WV 152	→ WV 180

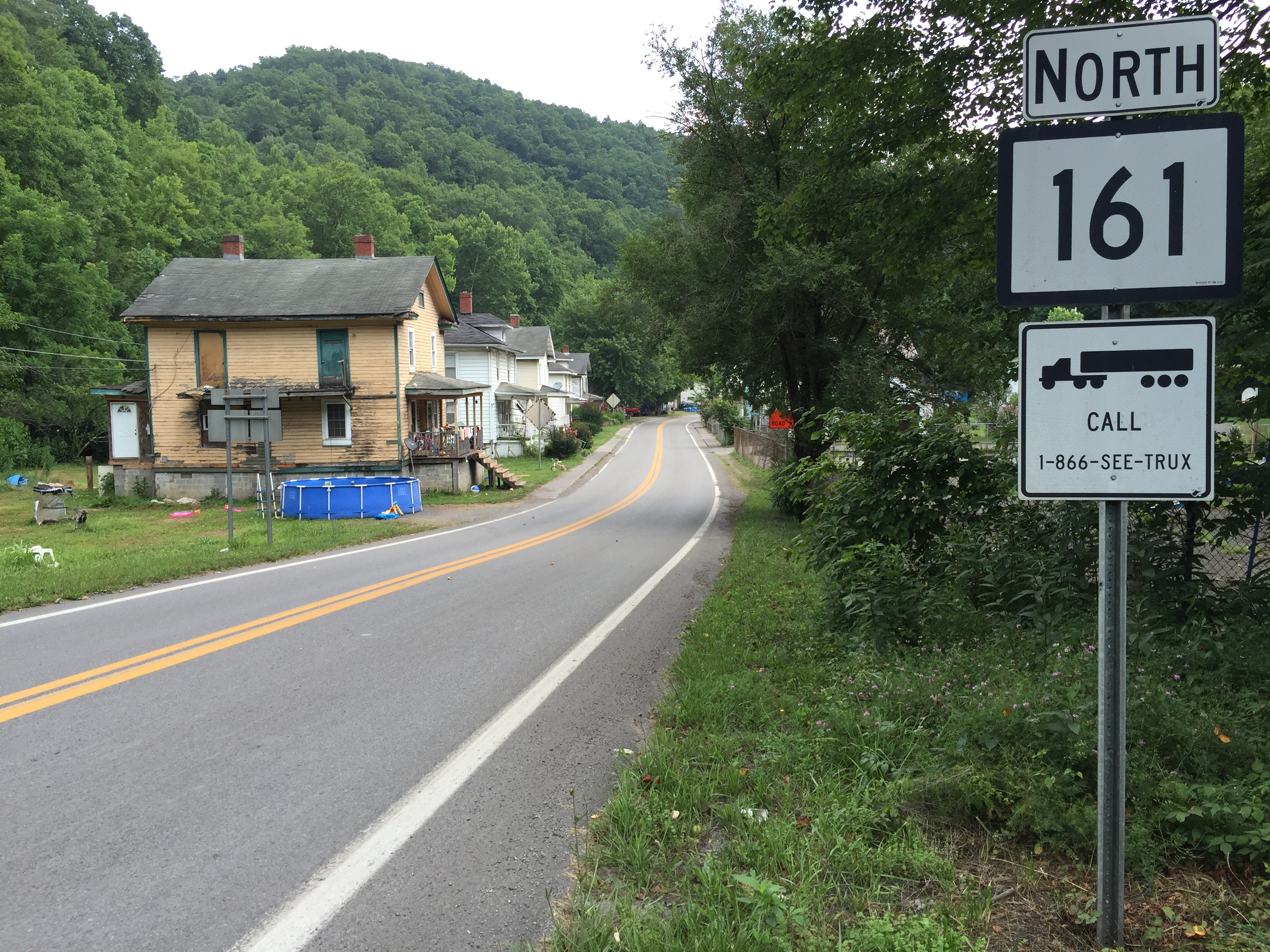
View north along WV 161 at WV 16 in Bishop

West Virginia Route 161 is a north–south state highway located entirely within McDowell County, West Virginia. The southern terminus of the route is at West Virginia Route 16 in Bishop less than 900 feet (270 m) from the Virginia state line. The northern terminus is at U.S. Route 52 in Elkhorn.

At Bishop, WV 161 enters Virginia for approximately 500 feet (150 m). The state line follows Jacobs Fork and Horsepen Creek, which form a tight bend. There are no signs or visual indications of the state line. West Virginia maintains the road in Virginia.

== Major intersections ==
The entire route is in McDowell County.

Location	mi	km	Destinations	Notes
Bishop			WV 16 – Tazewell, VA, War	
			SR 644 (Abbs Valley Road)	
			WV 103 west	
			CR 84 (Anawalt Ridge Road)	Former WV 102 east
Elkhorn			US 52	
1.000 mi = 1.609 km; 1.000 km = 0.621 mi
