= West Huntington Bridge =

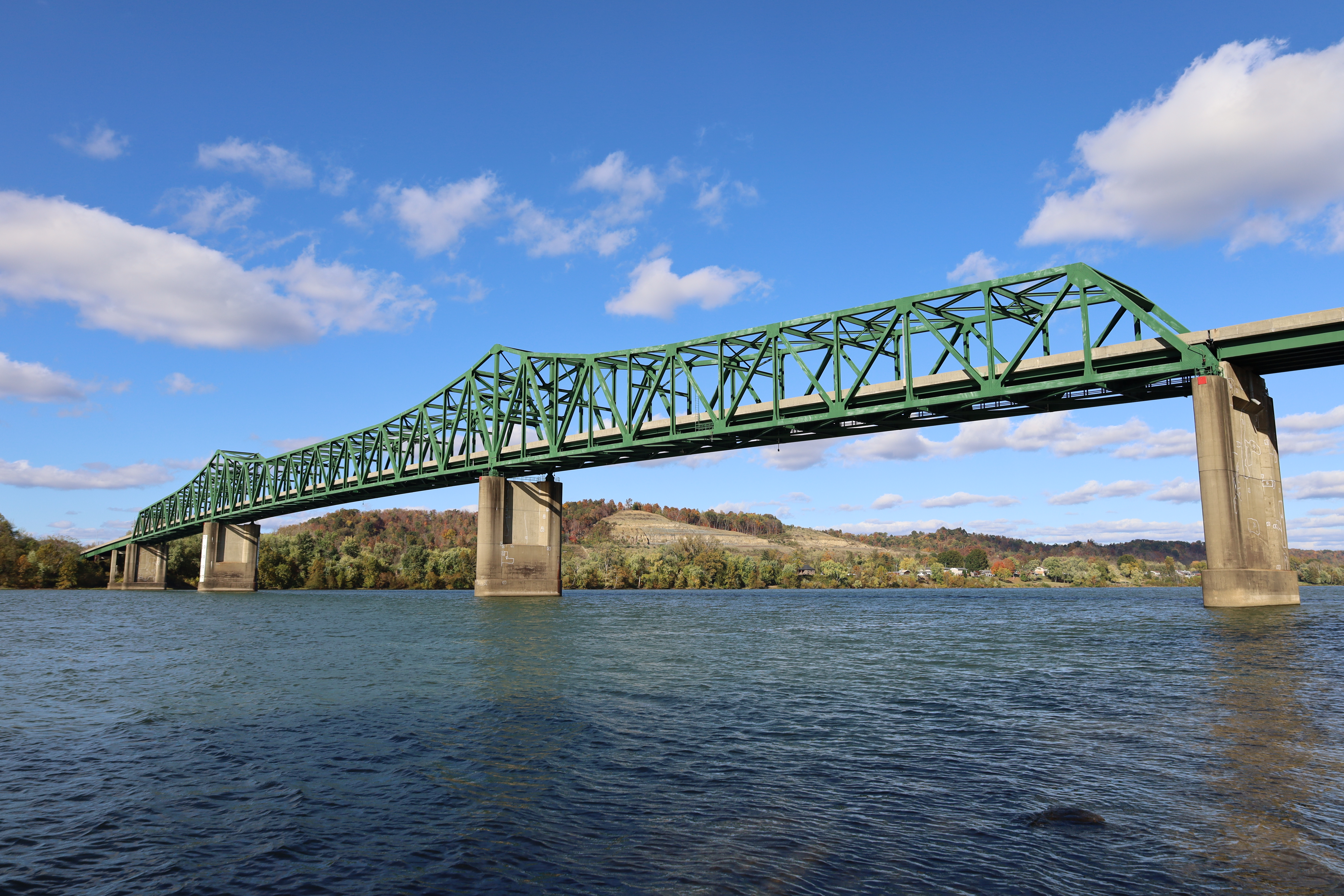
- The bridge in 2023
- Coordinates: 38°24′47″N 82°29′11″W
- Crosses: Ohio River
- Locale: Huntington, West Virginia and Burlington, Ohio
- Official name: Nick Joe Rahall II Bridge
- Maintained by: West Virginia Department of Transportation

The West Huntington Bridge (officially named the Nick Joe Rahall II Bridge, also called the West End Bridge or the 17th Street West Bridge) is a two-lane, 562-foot (171 m) cantilever bridge on the west side of Huntington, West Virginia, United States. It crosses the Ohio River and carries U.S. Route 52 between Ohio State Route 7 and Interstate 64.

== Background ==
The bridge was completed in 1968 at the cost of $5.2 million as part of the West Huntington Expressway.

West Virginia Route 94 was signed on this bridge until 1984 when U.S. Route 52 was diverted on to a new route with Interstate 64. In 1999, the bridge was closed to traffic for refurbishing, which included a new driving surface, barriers and a green paint scheme. On May 9, 1999, the bridge was reopened and subsequently dedicated to Nick Joe Rahall, the then-congressman for the 3rd District of West Virginia. It was the first public works project to bear his name.

The bridge can also be seen in the closing scene of the 2006 biopic We Are Marshall. A female character is seen traveling across the bridge, going into Ohio from Huntington.

== See also ==
- List of crossings of the Ohio River
- Transportation in Huntington, West Virginia
