= Justice, West Virginia =

- Census-designated place
- Location within West Virginia
- Coordinates: 37°35′19″N 81°50′07″W
- Country: United States
- State: West Virginia
- County: Mingo

Area
  - Total: 1.378 sq mi (3.57 km^{2})
  - Land: 1.320 sq mi (3.42 km^{2})
  - Water: 0.058 sq mi (0.15 km^{2})
- Elevation: 892 ft (272 m)

Population (2020)
  - Total: 313
  - Density: 237/sq mi (91.6/km^{2})
- Time zone: UTC-5 (Eastern (EST))
  - Summer (DST): UTC-4 (EDT)
- ZIP code: 24851
- Area codes: 304 & 681
- GNIS feature ID: 1541047

Justice is a census-designated place in Mingo County, West Virginia, United States. Justice is located on U.S. Route 52, 2.5 miles (4.0 km) southeast of Gilbert. Justice has a post office with ZIP code 24851. As of the 2020 census, its population was 313 (down from 412 at the 2010 census).

The community was named after W. E. Justice, an early postmaster.
