= Nemours, West Virginia =

- Unincorporated community
- Location within the state of West Virginia Nemours, West Virginia (the United States)
- Coordinates: 37°28′15″N 81°11′38″W
- Country: United States
- State: West Virginia
- County: Mercer
- Elevation: 2,342 ft (714 m)
- Time zone: UTC-5 (Eastern (EST))
  - Summer (DST): UTC-4 (EDT)
- ZIP code: 24738
- Area codes: 304 & 681
- GNIS feature ID: 1555199

Nemours is an unincorporated community in Mercer County, West Virginia, United States. Nemours is located along West Virginia Route 102, 2 miles (3.2 km) east of Pocahontas, Virginia. Nemours has a post office with ZIP code 24738.

Nemours was named after the primary employer in the town, E. I. du Pont de Nemours and Company, which had established a black powder factory in the town.

The town sits along the Bluestone River and across from Jimmy Lewis Lake of Pinnacle Rock State Park.

== Popular culture ==
The 1992 film, The Turning, takes place in Nemours, West Virginia.
