= Michael P. Moran =

American actor and playwright

- Moran playing Det. Bobby Fain in A Perfect Murder (1998)
- Born: Michael Patrick Moran; February 8, 1944; Yuba City, California, U.S.
- Died: February 4, 2004 (aged 59); New York, U.S.
- Education: New York University (MFA)
- Occupations: Actor; playwright

Michael Patrick Moran (February 8, 1944 – February 4, 2004) was an American actor and playwright.

== Life and career ==
Moran was born in Yuba City, California, but his family moved frequently because his father was a United States Army officer. While his family was living in Cedar Grove, New Jersey, he graduated in 1962 from Passaic Valley Regional High School in Little Falls. While he was a student there, he designed and supervised construction of an elaborate set for a benefit production of Robert Merrill's musical Take Me Along. He gained some of his first experience under Gilbert Rathbun in the theater program at Seton Hall University in South Orange, N.J. - though he was not a student there - and at the Theater on the Mall in Paramus, where he worked with director Robert Ludlum, who had not yet launched his career as a novelist. Moran's roles at Seton Hall included Sir Toby Belch in William Shakespeare's Twelfth Night and "Mortimer, the Man Who Dies" in The Fantasticks by Harvey Schmidt and Tom Jones.

Moran moved to the Lower East Side of New York City in 1966 and was educated at New York University's Tisch School of the Arts. He became a member of the theatre groups the Manhattan Project and the Cooper-Keaton Group. Both groups produced plays written by Moran, including Call Me Charlie, starring Danny DeVito. He also appeared in several productions for the New York Shakespeare Festival, and in off-Broadway productions including Sheridan's The Rivals (1984, Lion Theatre, 422 West 42nd Street), of which one critic wrote, "Michael P. Moran, built like a barrel, comes close to stealing the show as he roars and blusters through the role of Sir Anthony."

Moran appeared in several plays by Horton Foote at the Ensemble Studio Theatre: The Prisoner's Song (2002), Everything That Rises Must Converge, and The Belmont Avenue Social Club. The New York Times wrote of Prisoner's Song "Pitch-perfect performances by the four-member cast make it work. ... The galvanizing force, though, is Michael P. Moran's aching rendition of Luther Wright."

In 2002–2003, he portrayed Fred "Pap" Rose in the musical Hank Williams: Lost Highway by Randal Myler and Mike Harelik, based on the life of Hank Williams. The show played to a positive critical response at the Manhattan Ensemble Theatre in Soho and then at the Little Shubert Theatre in Midtown, with one reviewer writing "the cast is strong, particularly Michael P. Moran as Hank's manager Fred Rose".

Moran died in a New York hospital, from Guillain–Barré syndrome, 4 days before his 60th birthday.

== Filmography ==
=== Film ===
- 1979 Squeeze Play! as Bozo
- 1981 Knightriders as Cook
- 1983 The Survivors as Gun Salesman
- 1983 Scarface as Nick "The Pig"
- 1985 Marie as Bill Thompson
- 1986 Nine 1/2 Weeks as Flea Market Chicken Seller
- 1989 Physical Evidence as Tony Reugger
- 1989 Lean on Me as Mr. O'Malley
- 1989 Fletch Lives as Morgue Attendant
- 1989 Ghostbusters II as Frank, The Doorman
- 1990 State of Grace The Bartender
- 1991 Loser as Heavy Lawyer
- 1991 Age Isn't Everything
- 1992 The Turning as Jim McCutcheon
- 1993 Carlito's Way as Party Guest
- 1994 The Paper as Chuck
- 1994 Radioland Murders as Cop #9
- 1996 Mother Night as Violent Man
- 1996 Sleepers as Judge #1
- 1998 A Perfect Murder as Bobby Fain
- 1998 Harvest as Henry Upton
- 1999 Just the Ticket as Max "Fat Max"
- 1999 The Eden Myth as Dan Morgan
- 2000 Prince of Central Park as Security Guard
- 2002 City by the Sea as Herb
- 2003 Undermind as Grady
- 2003 Little Kings as Father Connolly (final film role)

=== Television ===
- 1990 H.E.L.P. as Captain Cragie
- 1992 Mathnet as John "Long John" Silverplate
- 1992 Square One TV as John "Long John" Silverplate / Lou
- 1994 Matlock as Vic
- 1995 Microsoft Windows 95 Video Guide as Boris
- 1995 The Cosby Mysteries
- 2000-2001 Deadline
- 2001 The Big Heist as Louis "The Whale"
- 2001 Law & Order: Criminal Intent as Mr. De Santis
- 1991-2002 Law & Order as Shannon Forsythe / Probation Officer / Judge Horace Barclay / Liotta / Limo Driver
- 2002 NYPD Blue as Hot Dog Vendor
