= Michael Dolan =

American actor (born 1965)

- Born: June 21, 1965 (age 60); Oklahoma, U.S.
- Occupations: Actor, director
- Years active: 1985–present

Michael Dolan (born June 21, 1965) is an American actor.

== Acting career ==
Michael Dolan was born in Oklahoma City, Oklahoma. His interest in cinema started at the age of 10, when he filmed a remake of Summer of '42 (1971), entitled Summer of '76. He dropped out of high school when he was 17 and moved to New York to become an actor. His professional career commenced in 1985, at age 20, with an off-broadway stage debut in the Albert Innaurato play Coming of Age in Soho and television appearances including the live television film The Execution of Raymond Graham. This was followed in 1987 with roles in the films Light of Day with Michael J. Fox and the ensemble cast Hamburger Hill.

In 1988, Dolan won the role of Pvt. James J. Hennesey in the film version of Neil Simon's Biloxi Blues with Matthew Broderick and the role of Scott Thorson in the Canada-US made-for-TV movie biography Liberace: Behind the Music. Among his other film credits are Necessary Roughness (1991), The Turning (1992), Courage Under Fire (1996) and Lolita (1997); on TV three episodes of I'll Fly Away (1992), one episode of The Outer Limits (1995), and two episodes of Law & Order (1993–95).

Dolan appears in the 1999 TNT Network made-for-cable movie The Hunley telling the tale of the H.L. Hunley, a submarine of the Confederate States of America. He is featured in Geoff Marslett's rotoscoped 2010 sci-fi romantic comedy film Mars as ESA Commander David Jones.

== Subsequent careers ==
Dolan wrote and directed the 1997 film Arrow Shot that premiered at the Sundance Film Festival. "My short film was very successful with Sundance, over 50 festivals and many European sales and a two-year run on Bravo", he said in a recent interview".

Using the moniker of "Mike Dolan," his feature film directorial debut was in 2010 with Dance with the One, shot in Austin, Texas, with a primarily local cast, crew and soundtrack. "I wanted to spend more time writing so I accepted a three-year fellowship to the Michener Center for Writers at the University of Texas in 2004. There I became involved in the development of several feature projects including Dance with the One", says Dolan. "When the University of Texas Film Institute decided to make Dance they asked me to pitch to direct it".
