= Wolfe, West Virginia =

- Unincorporated community
- Location within the state of West Virginia Wolfe, West Virginia (the United States)
- Coordinates: 37°18′26″N 81°19′43″W
- Country: United States
- State: West Virginia
- County: Mercer
- Elevation: 2,303 ft (702 m)
- Time zone: UTC-5 (Eastern (EST))
  - Summer (DST): UTC-4 (EDT)
- ZIP code: 24751
- Area codes: 304 & 681
- GNIS feature ID: 1556018

Wolfe is an unincorporated community in Mercer County, West Virginia, United States. Wolfe is located along West Virginia Route 102 at the Virginia border and is 0.5 miles (0.80 km) east-northeast of Pocahontas, Virginia. Wolfe had a post office, which closed on June 25, 2011.

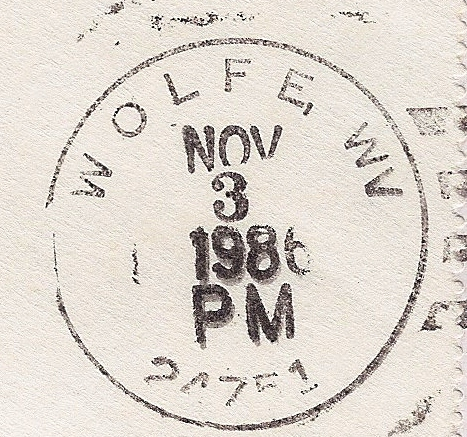
