= West Virginia Route 101 =

State highway in West Virginia, United States

West Virginia Route 101

Route information
- Maintained by WVDOH
- Length: 0.98 mi (1,580 m)

Major junctions
- South end: US 60 in Huntington
- North end: US 60 in Huntington

Location
- Country: United States
- State: West Virginia
- Counties: Cabell

Highway system
- West Virginia State Highway System; Interstate; US; State
← WV 100	→ WV 102

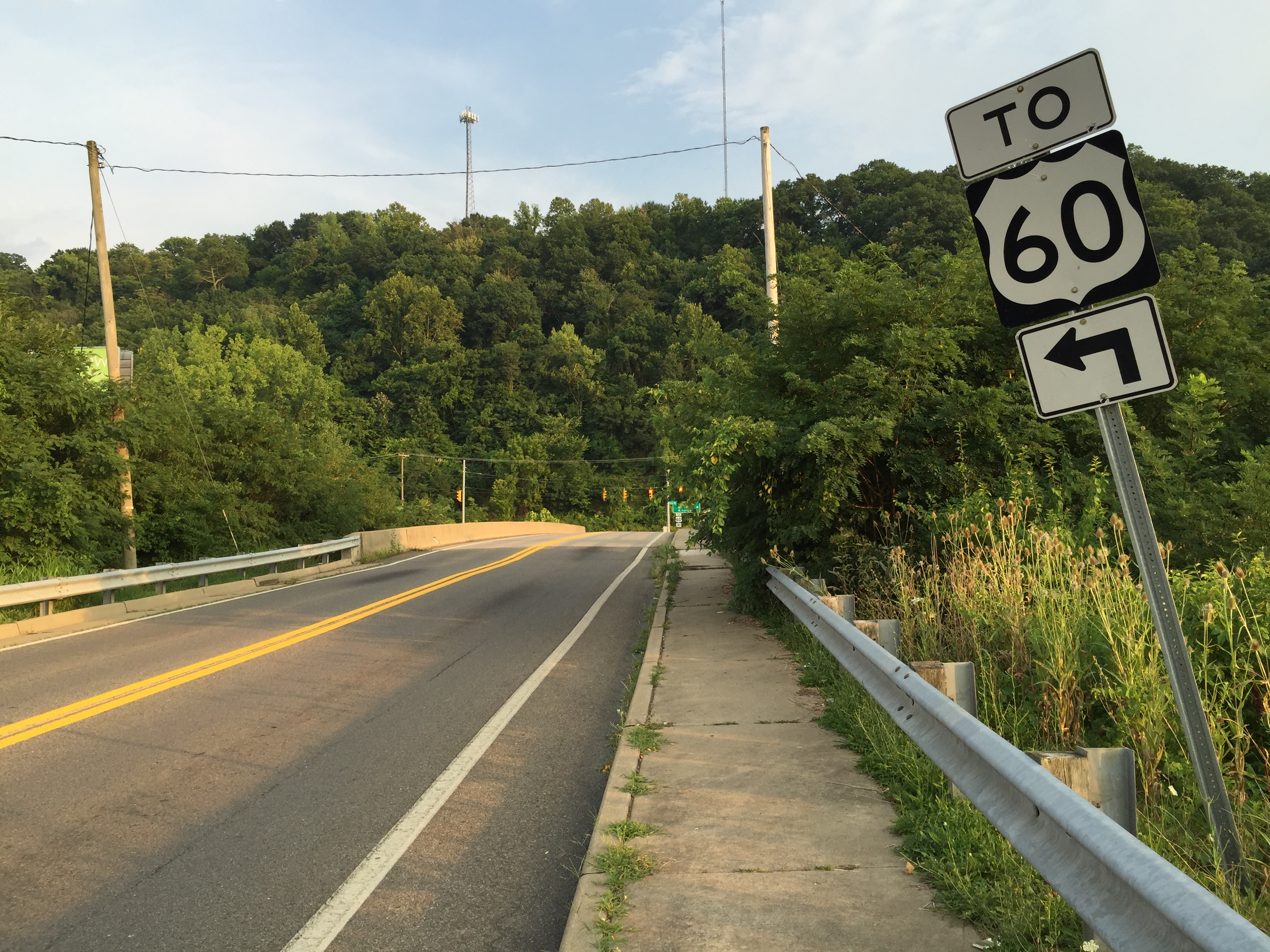
View south along WV 101 in Huntington

West Virginia Route 101 is an unsigned 0.98-mile (1.58 km) long north–south state highway in the City of Huntington in Cabell County, West Virginia. The southern terminus of the route is at U.S. Route 60 (31st Street). The northern terminus is at US 60 (Third Avenue).

From 31st Street, WV 101 follows Eighth Avenue west to 29th Street, where WV 101 turns north to follow 29th Street to Third Avenue.

== History ==
WV 101 was part of US 60 until US 60 was moved two blocks to the east in 1990.

== Major intersections ==
The entire route is in Huntington, Cabell County.

mi	km	Destinations	Notes
0.0	0.0	US 60 to I-64	
0.3	0.48	8th Avenue (CR 1011)	
0.6	0.97	US 60 east (5th Avenue)	
0.8	1.3	US 60 west (3rd Avenue)	
1.000 mi = 1.609 km; 1.000 km = 0.621 mi
