= Brush Fork, West Virginia =

- Census-designated place (CDP)
- Location in Mercer County and the state of West Virginia.
- Coordinates: 37°16′53″N 81°15′08″W
- Country: United States
- State: West Virginia
- County: Mercer

Area
  - Total: 1.903 sq mi (4.93 km^{2})
  - Land: 1.901 sq mi (4.92 km^{2})
  - Water: 0.002 sq mi (0.0052 km^{2})
- Elevation: 2,526 ft (770 m)

Population (2020)
  - Total: 1,065
  - Density: 560.2/sq mi (216.3/km^{2})
- Time zone: UTC-5 (Eastern (EST))
  - Summer (DST): UTC-4 (EDT)
- Area codes: 304 & 681
- GNIS feature ID: 2586774

Brush Fork (also spelled Brushfork) is a census-designated place (CDP) in Mercer County, West Virginia, United States. Brush Fork is 2 miles (3.2 km) northwest of Bluefield. As of the 2020 census, its population was 1,065 (down from 1,197 at the 2010 census).

The community takes its name from nearby Brush Fork creek which flows into the Bluestone River.

The West Virginia National Guard Brushfork Armory is located in the community. In addition to its National Guard functions it also hosts basketball games for Bluefield High School, commencements for local colleges and high schools, and other events. The Armory received 1.9 million dollars in 2024 for the planning and design of a new readiness center at the Brushfork Armory that meets all requirements for anti-terrorism and force protection in Bluefield.

Tourism in Brushfork is gaining with visitors to the Hatfield-McCoy Trails traveling and staying in the area.

== Education ==
Brushfork currently is home to Brushfork Elementary which will close in 2025 when the new Timberwood Elementary opens. Timberwood Elementary is a consolidation of Brushfork and Bluewell Elementary schools.

Brushfork was the former home of Bluefield College of Evangelism. Its first campus was the still active Christian Acres Camp before they moved to the adjacent campus. Bluefield College of Evangelism is now known as Blueridge College of Evangelism and has moved to Wytheville.

== Transportation ==
US 52 and West Virginia Route 123 intersect in Brushfork at Airport Square. The Mercer County Airport is just east of Brushfork. WV 123 turns to VA 643 at the state line which then intersects with VA 102.

Brushfork has bus service throughout Mercer and McDowell via Bluefield Area Transit.
