= Racine, West Virginia =

- Census-designated place
- Location within West Virginia and the United States
- Coordinates: 38°8′31″N 81°39′37″W
- Country: United States
- State: West Virginia
- County: Boone

Area
  - Total: 0.512 sq mi (1.33 km^{2})
  - Land: 0.479 sq mi (1.24 km^{2})
  - Water: 0.033 sq mi (0.085 km^{2})

Population (2020)
  - Total: 267
  - Density: 557/sq mi (215/km^{2})
- Time zone: UTC-5 (Eastern (EST))
  - Summer (DST): UTC-4 (EDT)

Racine is a census-designated place (CDP) in Boone County, West Virginia, United States. As of the 2020 census, its population was 267 (up from 256 at the 2010 census).

The community was named after Racine, Ohio, the native home of first settlers.

Racine is home to the Racine Volunteer Fire Department, which covers 174 square miles (450 km^{2}) in its first response area. The John Slack Park is also located in Racine next to the fire department.
