= Elkhorn, West Virginia =

Unincorporated community in West Virginia, United States

Elkhorn
- Unincorporated community
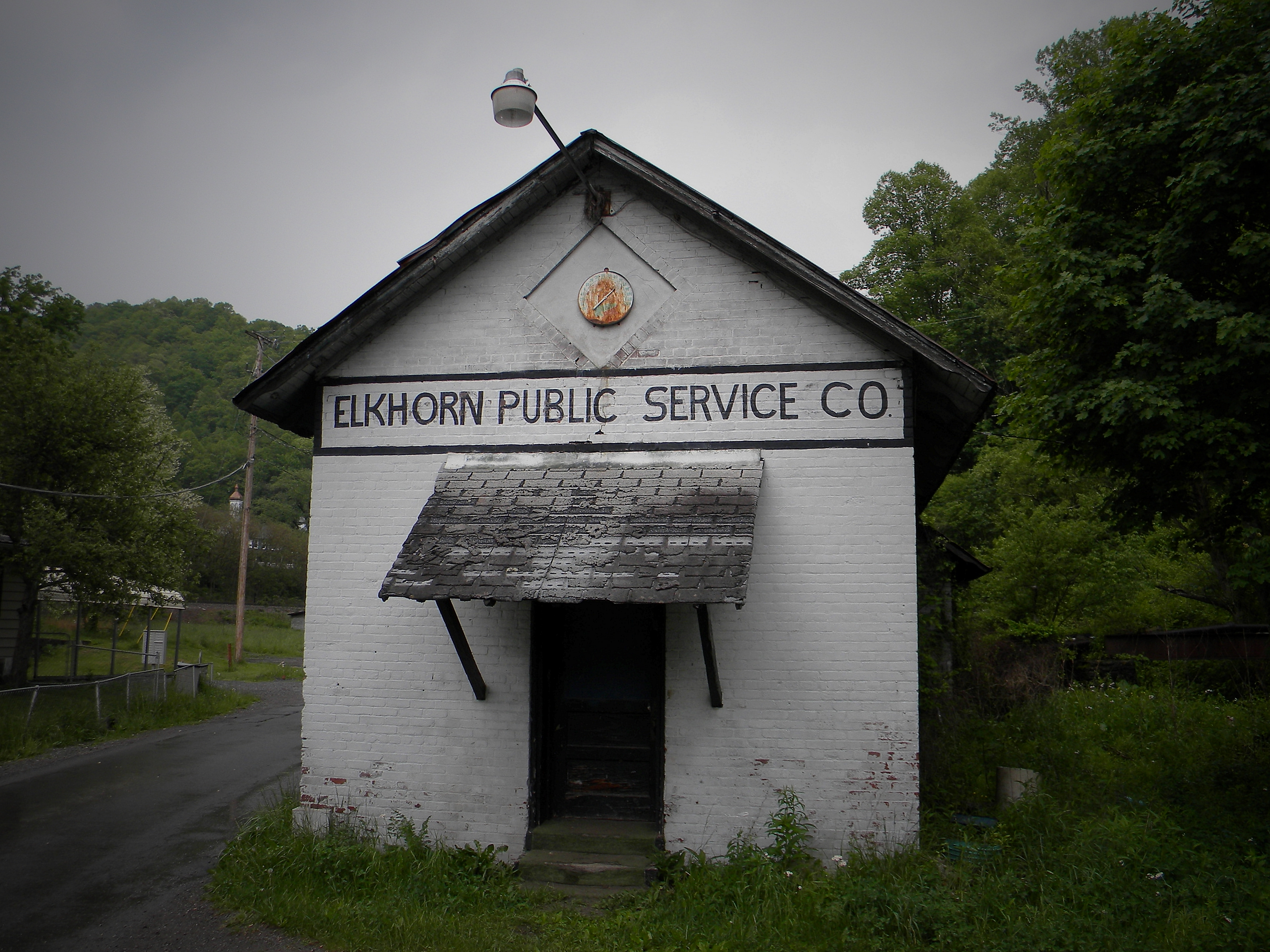
- Elkhorn West Virginia Service Company

- Location within the state of West Virginia Elkhorn (the United States)
- Coordinates: 37°23′8″N 81°24′39″W
- Country: United States
- State: West Virginia
- County: McDowell
- Elevation: 1,988 ft (606 m)
- Time zone: UTC-5 (Eastern (EST))
  - Summer (DST): UTC-4 (EDT)
- ZIP code: 24830
- GNIS feature ID: 1554386

Elkhorn is an unincorporated community in McDowell County, West Virginia, United States. It is along U.S. Route 52 and takes its name from the Elkhorn Creek.

The John J. Lincoln House was listed on the National Register of Historic Places in 1992.

== Notable people ==
- Fuzzy Haskins (June 8, 1941 - March 16, 2023), American musician: born in Elkhorn.
- Angie Turner King (December 9, 1905 – February 28, 2004), chemist, mathematician, and educator; born in Elkhorn.
- Tamiko Jones (July 15, 1943 -), Jazz, disco and popular music singer, Record label owner, Radio executive and Grammy foundation Trustee born in Elkhorn, 1943. Spent early years in home of Grandfather, Grady Dalton.

== Climate ==
The climate in this area has mild differences between highs and lows, and there is adequate rainfall year-round. According to the Köppen Climate Classification system, Elkhorn has a marine west coast climate, abbreviated "Cfb" on climate maps.
