= Twisted Gun Gap =

Coordinates: 37.6042754°N 81.9320647°W

Twisted Gun Gap (elevation: 1,473 feet (449 m)) is a gap in the U.S. state of West Virginia.

According to tradition, Twisted Gun Gap was named from an incident when a trapped pioneer twisted his gun to render it useless to the Indians.
