= Shawnee Parkway =

Highway in West Virginia, USA

West Virginia Route 154
- Shawnee Parkway

Route information
- Length: 23 mi (37 km)

Major junctions
- South end: Ghent
- North end: Near Ashland

Location
- Country: United States
- State: West Virginia
- Counties: Mercer, McDowell

Highway system
- West Virginia State Highway System; Interstate; US; State
← WV 152	→ WV 161

The Shawnee Parkway, planned to be designated as West Virginia Route 154, is a proposed 23-mile-long (37 km) two-lane arterial highway. Should it be constructed, the highway will run through McDowell, Wyoming, Mercer, and Raleigh counties in southwestern West Virginia. The expressway is proposed to begin at the Ghent interchange along Interstate 77 (West Virginia Turnpike) in the east and end at the planned King Coal Highway (relocated U.S. Route 52) near Ashland.

The highway was identified as a High Priority Corridor in the Intermodal Surface Transportation Efficiency Act of 1991 (ISTEA). The study area, consisting of County Routes 11 and 14 in Mercer County, and County Routes 16/6 and 16/2 in Wyoming County, features extensive no-passing zones, narrow roadway widths, non-existent shoulders, sharp horizontal curves, steep vertical grades, and substandard pavement materials for a heavy traffic load. As a result, the level of service along the routes within the study area range from B to E.
