= Steeles, West Virginia =

Community in West Virginia, US

- Unincorporated community
- Location within West Virginia Location within the United States
- Coordinates: 37°32′20″N 81°46′31″W
- Country: United States
- State: West Virginia
- County: Wyoming
- Elevation: 1,119 ft (341 m)
- Time zone: UTC-5 (Eastern (EST))
  - Summer (DST): UTC-4 (EDT)
- Area codes: 304 & 681
- GNIS feature ID: 1555707

Steeles is an unincorporated community in Wyoming County, West Virginia, United States. Steeles is 5.5 miles (8.9 km) north-northeast of Iaeger.
