= Yards, Virginia and West Virginia =

Yards
- Unincorporated community
- Location within the state of West Virginia Yards (the United States)
- Coordinates: 37°17′32″N 81°18′36″W
- Country: United States
- States: Virginia and West Virginia
- County: Tazewell (Virginia) and Mercer (West Virginia)
- Elevation: 2,382 ft (726 m)
- Time zone: UTC-5 (Eastern (EST))
  - Summer (DST): UTC-4 (EDT)
- GNIS feature ID: 1477028

Yards is an unincorporated community straddling the border between Tazewell County, Virginia and Mercer County, West Virginia, United States. Yards is located on the Bluestone River, 4 miles (6.4 km) northwest of Bluefield, Virginia. Yards had a post office on the Virginia side of the border from 1888 until May 28, 1994. The community was named for its railroad yards.
