= John J. Lincoln House =

Historic house in West Virginia, United States

- U.S. National Register of Historic Places
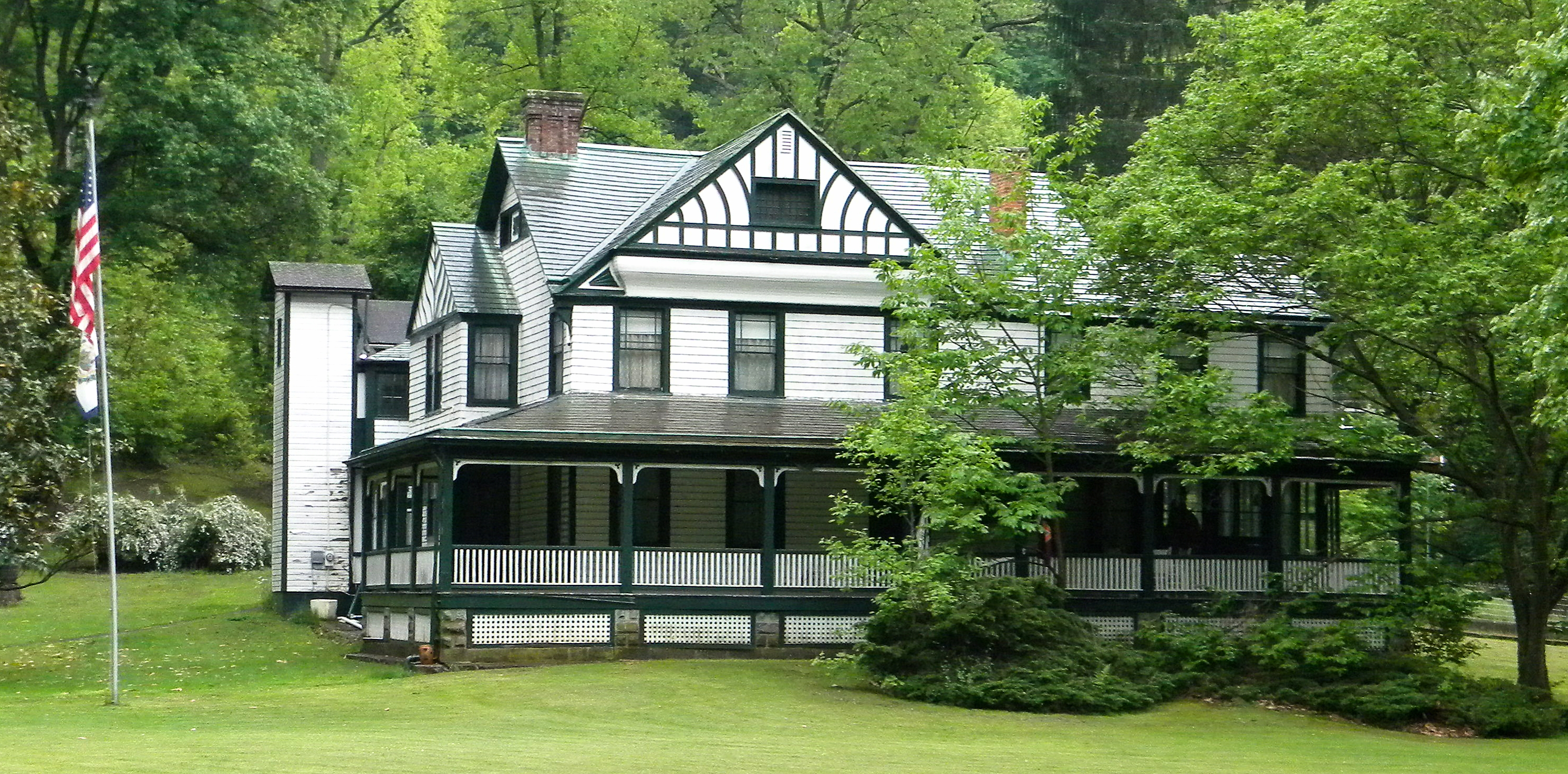
- John J Lincoln House

- Location within West Virginia Location within the United States
- Location: N of US 52, Elkhorn, West Virginia
- Coordinates: 37°23′7″N 81°24′46″W
- Area: 2.5 acres (1.0 ha)
- Built: 1899
- Architectural style: Late 19th And Early 20th Century American Movements
- NRHP reference No.: 92000900
- Added to NRHP: July 16, 1992

John J. Lincoln House is a historic home located at Elkhorn, McDowell County, West Virginia. It was built in 1899, and is a 2 1/2-story, L-shaped, frame dwelling on a stone foundation. It features a multigabled roofline, half-timber decoration, and a hipped roof wrap-around porch. Also on the property is a contributing two story I house and hipped roof, clapboard-sided dairy house. It was built for John J. Lincoln, an influential leader in southern West Virginia's coal mining industry.

It was listed on the National Register of Historic Places in 1992.
