= Sandlick, West Virginia =

- Unincorporated community
- Location within the state of West Virginia Sandlick, West Virginia (the United States)
- Coordinates: 37°20′21″N 81°13′12″W
- Country: United States
- State: West Virginia
- County: Mercer
- Elevation: 2,579 ft (786 m)
- Time zone: UTC-5 (Eastern (EST))
  - Summer (DST): UTC-4 (EDT)
- Area codes: 304 & 681
- GNIS feature ID: 1552794

Sandlick is an unincorporated community in Mercer County, West Virginia, United States. Sandlick is located on Sandlick Creek at the junction of County Routes 71/5 and 71/13, 4.8 miles (7.7 km) north of Bluefield.
