= Abbs Valley, Virginia =

Census-designated place in Virginia, US

- Census-designated place
- Location within Virginia Location within the United States
- Coordinates: 37°14′38″N 81°27′08″W
- Country: United States
- State: Virginia
- County: Tazewell
- Elevation: 2,615 ft (797 m)

Population (2020)
  - Total: 299
- Time zone: UTC-5 (Eastern (EST))
  - Summer (DST): UTC-4 (EDT)
- Area code: 276
- GNIS feature ID: 2807445

Abbs Valley is an unincorporated community and census-designated place (CDP) located in Tazewell County, Virginia, United States.

Abb's Valley is named after Absalom Looney of Looney's Creek, considered the first white person to explore the area.

== Demographics ==
Historical population
Census	Pop.	Note	%±
2020	299		—
U.S. Decennial Census; 2010 2020

The community was first listed as a CDP in the 2020 census with a population of 299.

Abbs Valley CDP, Virginia – Racial and ethnic composition Note: the US Census treats Hispanic/Latino as an ethnic category. This table excludes Latinos from the racial categories and assigns them to a separate category. Hispanics/Latinos may be of any race.
Race / Ethnicity (NH = Non-Hispanic)	Pop 2020	2020
White alone (NH)	296	99.00%
Black or African American alone (NH)	0	0.00%
Native American or Alaska Native alone (NH)	0	0.00%
Asian alone (NH)	0	0.00%
Native Hawaiian or Pacific Islander alone (NH)	0	0.00%
Other race alone (NH)	0	0.00%
Mixed race or Multiracial (NH)	3	1.00%
Hispanic or Latino (any race)	0	0.00%
Total	299	100.00%
