= West Virginia High School Boys' Soccer State Tournament =

US high school soccer tournament

West Virginia High School Boys' Soccer State
- Founded: 1988; 38 years ago
- Country: United States
- Confederation: WVSSAC
- Number of clubs: 4 per class
- Current champions: AAAA - Hurricane (3rd title) AAA - Bridgeport (1st title) AA-A - St. Joseph Central(2nd title) (2025)
- Most championships: George Washington and Charleston Catholic (8 titles)
- Website: WVSSAC Official website

The West Virginia High School Boys' Soccer State Tournament is an annual postseason soccer tournament held in West Virginia, United States. The tournament is open to all high school boys' soccer teams that compete in the state.. The tournament is organized by the West Virginia Secondary School Activities Commission (WVSSAC).

== History ==
The West Virginia High School Boys' Soccer State Tournament was first held in 1988. The tournament was created to provide an opportunity for the state's top high school boys' soccer teams to compete against each other in a postseason format. From 1988 until 2007 the schools where in an unified system, meaning all schools played at the same level. From 2008 until 2024, the schools were divided in two classes: AAA (schools with 801 or more students) and AA-A (school with 800 or less students). From 2025 until now, the schools were divided in three classes: AAAA(schools with 1050 or more students) AAA (schools with 625 - 1049 students) and AA-A (school with 624 or less students). This schools only competes between their classes on the post season.

This means that from 1988 - 2007 only one school could be state champion each year, from 2008 to 2024, 2 schools were state champions every year (one school from class AAA and one school from class AA-A), and from 2025 to current days, 3 schools are state champions every year (one school from class AAAA, one school from class AAA and one school from class AA-A).

== Format ==
The West Virginia High School Boys' Soccer State Tournament is a single-elimination tournament featuring 4 teams from each class. The top team from each of the state's four regions qualify for the tournament. The tournament is typically held over the course of two days at a neutral location, with the semi-final and championship matches.

== Unify system 1988-2007 ==
=== State Tournament by year ===
2005

==== 2005 ====
State semi-finals
Fairmont Senior | 1
Martinsburg | 0
Parkersburg | 1
Capital | 0

State Championship Game
Fairmont Senior | 0
Parkersburg(a.e.t.) | 1

===== State semi-finals =====
November 3, 2005
10:00 GMT-4

| Fairmont Senior | 1–0 | Martinsburg |
|---|---|---|
| Patrick Bonasso 2' |

YMCA Youth Sports Complex
November 3, 2005
12:00 GMT-4

| Parkersburg | 1–0 | Capital |
|---|---|---|
| Deric McDonald 18' |

YMCA Youth Sports Complex

===== State Championship Game =====
November 4, 2005
13:30 GMT-4

| Fairmont Senior | 0-1 | Parkersburg |
|---|---|---|
| | | Michael Pitrolo 73' |

YMCA Youth Sports Complex

Champion
Parkersburg
(3rd Title)
Top goalscorer
Alex George
(31goals)

==== Team of the year ====

Coach: Jim DeNardi

==== Awards ====
Player Of The Year
Chase DeWeese (Woodrow Wilson)
Forward Of The Year
Alex George (Woodrow Wilson)
Midfielder Of The Year
Patrick Bonasso (Fairmont Senior)
Defender Of The Year
Abe Levin-Nielsen (Parkersburg)
Keeper Of The Year
Ryan Whitehead (Brooke)
Coach Of The Year
Jim DeNardi (Fairmont Senior)

2006

==== 2006 ====
State semi-finals
Wheeling Park | 0
Woodrow Wilson | 1
Parkersburg | 2
Jefferson | 0

State Championship Game
Woodrow Wilson | 1
Parkersburg(a.e.t.) | 2

===== State semi-finals =====
November 3, 2006
10:00 GMT-4

| Wheeling Park | 0–1 | Woodrow Wilson |
|---|---|---|
| | | Alex Cottle 53' |

YMCA Youth Sports Complex
November 3, 2006
12:00 GMT-4

| Parkersburg | 2–0 | Jefferson |
|---|---|---|
| Tim Stephens 39'; Cam Lemley 48' |

YMCA Youth Sports Complex

===== State Championship Game =====
November 4, 2006
13:30 GMT-4

| Woodrow Wilson | 1-2 (a.e.t.) | Parkersburg |
|---|---|---|
| Chandler DeWese 9' | | Tim Stephens 60'; Michael Harmon 110' |

YMCA Youth Sports Complex

Champion
Parkersburg
(4th Title)
Top goalscorer
Vinny Crumrine
(32 goals)

==== Team of the year ====

Coach: Doug Hunt

==== Awards ====
Player Of The Year
Vinny Crumrine (Wheeling Park)
Forward Of The Year
Matt Tiano (Jefferson)
Midfielder Of The Year
Brett Parker (Fairmont Senior)
Defender Of The Year
Todd McClure (Parkersburg)
Keeper Of The Year
Brent McGee (Parkersburg)
Coach Of The Year
Doug Hunt (Jefferson)

2007

==== 2007 ====
State semi-finals
Regional 1 Champion | Morgantown | 0
Regional 4 Champion | Hurricane | 2
Regional 3 Champion | George Washington | 2
Regional 2 Champion | Jefferson | 1

State Championship Game
Hurricane | 0
George Washington | 1

===== State semi-finals =====
November 2, 2007
10:00 GMT-4

| Morgantown | 0–2 | Hurricane |
|---|---|---|
| | | Ryan Gdula 3'; Brooks Paine 63' |

YMCA Youth Sports Complex
November 2, 2007
12:00 GMT-4

| George Washington | 2–1 | Jefferson |
|---|---|---|
| Jake Stevens 10'; Nick Claudio 65' | | Will Corley 57' |

YMCA Youth Sports Complex

===== State Championship Game =====
November 3, 2007
13:30 GMT-4

| Hurricane | 0-1 | George Washington |
|---|---|---|
| | | P.J. Wolfe 24' |

YMCA Youth Sports Complex

Champion
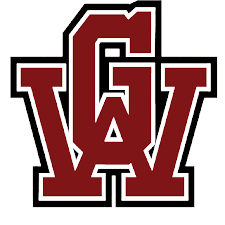
George Washington
(1st Title)
Top goalscorer
Victor Garcia
(27 goals)

==== Team of the year ====

Coach: Tom Hopper

==== Awards ====
Player Of The Year
Nader Sawtarie (Linsly School)
Forward Of The Year
Josh Cyrus (Hurricane)
Midfielder Of The Year
Joseph Rodriquez (Woodrow Wilson)
Defender Of The Year
Nate Zeli (Hurricane)
Tim Stephens (Parkersburg)
Keeper Of The Year
Brent McGee (Parkersburg)
Coach Of The Year
Tom Hopper (George Washington)

=== List of champions ===
Below are the list of champions and runners-up of the West Virginia High School Boys' Soccer State Tournament:

| Season | Winner | Runner-up | Result |
|---|---|---|---|
| 1988 | St. Joseph Central (1) | Morgantown | 2-1 |
| 1989 | Morgantown (1) | St. Joseph Central | 2-1 |
| 1990 | Nitro (1) | St. Joseph Central | 2-0(a.e.t.) |
| 1991 | Wheeling Park (1) | St. Joseph Central | 6-4 |
| 1992 | Capital (1) | St. Joseph Central | 3-1 |
| 1993 | Buckhannon-Upshur (1) | George Washington | 5-3 |
| 1994 | Buckhannon-Upshur (2) | Brooke | 1-0 |
| 1995 | Buckhannon-Upshur (3) | Parkersburg | 3-0 |
| 1996 | Parkersburg (1) | Woodrow Wilson | 1-0 |
| 1997 | Parkersburg (2) | St. Joseph Central | 4-3 |
| 1998 | Capital (2) | Wheeling Park | 3-2 |
| 1999 | Morgantown (2) | Charleston Catholic | 4-0 |
| 2000 | Morgantown (3) | Parkersburg South | 4-2(a.e.t.) |
| 2001 | Wheeling Park (2) | Morgantown | 1-0(p) |
| 2002 | Woodrow Wilson (1) | Wheeling Park | 3-1 |
| 2003 | Capital (3) | Morgantown | 3-0 |
| 2004 | Woodrow Wilson (2) | Parkersburg | 3-1 |
| 2005 | Parkersburg (3) | Fairmont Senior | 1-0 |
| 2006 | Parkersburg (4) | Woodrow Wilson | 2-1(a.e.t.) |
| 2007 | George Washington (1) | Hurricane | 1-0 |

== Two-class system (AAA, AA-A) 2008–2024 ==
=== State Tournament by year ===
AAA

2008

==== 2008 ====
Regional Finals
Martinsburg | 3
Bridgeport | 0
Wheeling Park | 1
Fairmont Senior | 0
George Washington | 2
Princeton | 1
Cabell Midland | 2
Parkersburg | 1

State semi-finals
Martinsburg | 0
Wheeling Park | 1
George Washington | 1
Parkersburg (a.e.t.) | 2

State Championship Game
Wheeling Park | 0
Parkersburg | 2

===== State semi-finals =====
November 7, 2008
10:00 GMT-4

| George Washington | 1–2 (a.e.t.) | Parkersburg |
|---|---|---|
| Adam Younis 54' | | Brian Runyon 10', 103' |

YMCA Youth Sports Complex
November 7, 2008
12:00 GMT-4

| Martinsburg | 0–1 | Wheeling Park |
|---|---|---|
| | | Fernando Olea-Comas 31' |

YMCA Youth Sports Complex

===== State Championship Game =====
November 8, 2008
13:30 GMT-4

| Wheeling Park | 0-2 | Parkersburg |
|---|---|---|
| | | George Capel 54'; Matthew Sellers 66' |

YMCA Youth Sports Complex

Champion
Parkersburg
(5th Title)
Top goalscorer
Zach Aberholt
(17 goals)

==== Team of the year ====

Coach: Don Fosselman

==== Awards ====
Player Of The Year
Jeremy Chambers (Princeton)
Forward Of The Year
Alex Ross (Nitro)
Midfielder Of The Year
Zach Aderholt (Wheeling Park)
Defender Of The Year
Jamel Boukhemis (Huntington)
Keeper Of The Year
Noah Blackhurst (Hurricane)
Coach Of The Year
Don Fosselman (Parkersburg)

2009

==== 2009 ====
State semi-finals
Fairmont Senior | 0
Woodrow Wilson | 3
Parkersburg | 2
Martinsburg | 0

State Championship Game
Woodrow Wilson | 0
Parkersburg | 2

===== State semi-finals =====
November 6, 2009
10:00 GMT-4

| Fairmont Senior | 0–3 | Woodrow Wilson |
|---|---|---|
| | | Tanner Pfeiffer 20'; Tony Serge 58' (pen.); Ryan Kissinger 64' |

YMCA Youth Sports Complex
November 6, 2009
12:00 GMT-4

| Parkersburg | 2–0 | Martinsburg |
|---|---|---|
| Harlen Gibson 39'; Brian Runyon 76' |

YMCA Youth Sports Complex

===== State Championship Game =====
November 7, 2009
13:30 GMT-4

| Woodrow Wilson | 0-2 | Parkersburg |
|---|---|---|
| | | George Capel 29'; Brian Runyon 71' |

YMCA Youth Sports Complex

Champion
Parkersburg
(6th Title)
Top goalscorer
Brooks Nucilli
(49 goals)

==== Team of the year ====

Coach: Andy Montgomery & Jim Dagostine

==== Awards ====
Player Of The Year
Brooks Nucilli (Fairmont Senior)
Forward Of The Year
Zack Montebell (Hurricane)
Midfielder Of The Year
Zack Claudio (George Washington)
Defender Of The Year
Tony Serge (Woodrow Wilson)
Keeper Of The Year
Noah Blackhurst (Hurricane)
Coach Of The Year
Andy Montgomery (Elkins)
Jim Dagostine (Huntington)

2010

==== 2010 ====
State semi-finals
Woodrow Wilson | 4
Washington | 1
Hurricane | 1(2)
Wheeling Park | 1(3)

State Championship Game
Woodrow Wilson | 1
Wheeling Park | 0

==== State semi-finals ====
November 5, 2010
10:00 GMT-4

| Woodrow Wilson | 4-1 | Washington |
|---|---|---|
| Ben Stafford 6'; Roy Saikali 39'; Michael Zutaut 48', 53' | | Nano Cruz 53' |

YMCA Youth Sports Complex
November 5, 2010
12:00 GMT-4

| Hurricane | 1-1 | Wheeling Park |
|---|---|---|
| Nicholas Zeli 86' | | Mike Zandron 5' |
Penalties
| Ian Miles (penalty scored); Lian Fasthbound (penalty missed); Noah Miller (penalty missed); Oliver Stand (penalty scored); Logan Beabout (penalty missed); Nicholas Zeli (penalty missed) | 2–3 | (penalty scored) Kohlby Jebbia; (penalty scored) Mane Wilson; (penalty missed) Joseph Norbs; (penalty missed) Daniel Knight; (penalty missed) Eric Nelson; (penalty scored) Mike Zandron |

YMCA Youth Sports Complex

==== State Championship Game ====
November 6, 2010
10:30 GMT-4

| Woodrow Wilson | 1-0 | Wheeling Park |
|---|---|---|
| Bou-Abboud 31' |

YMCA Youth Sports Complex

Champion

Woodrow Wilson
(3rd Title)

==== Team of the year ====

Coach: Mario Julian

==== Awards ====
Player Of The Year
Brian Runyon (Parkersburg)
Forward Of The Year
Josh Henderson (Wheeling Park)
Midfielder Of The Year
Trevor Starcher (Hurricane)
Defender Of The Year
Wes McWatters (Hurricane)
Keeper Of The Year
Cody Thompson (Preston)
Coach Of The Year
Mario Julian (Wheeling Park)

2011

==== 2011 ====
State semi-finals
Regional 1 Champion | Wheeling Park | 1
Regional 2 Champion | Washington | 2
Regional 3 Champion | George Washington | 1
Regional 4 Champion | Hurricane | 0

State Championship Game
Washington | 2
George Washington | 5

===== State semi-finals =====
November 5, 2011
10:00 GMT-4

| Wheeling Park | 1–2 | Washington |
|---|---|---|
| Kyle George 10' | | Newhouse 46'; Bouchoc 58' |

YMCA Youth Sports Complex
November 5, 2011
12:00 GMT-4

| George Washington | 1–0 | Hurricane |
|---|---|---|
| Garrett Warner 75' |

YMCA Youth Sports Complex

===== State Championship Game =====
November 6, 2011
10:30 GMT-4

| George Washington | 5–2 | Washington |
|---|---|---|
| Ramon Carvalho 4'; Carter Phillips 10', 23'; Adam Kawash 13'; Jeffrey Hodge 44' | | Daniel Hepner 14'; Myle Newhouse 64' |

YMCA Youth Sports Complex

Champion
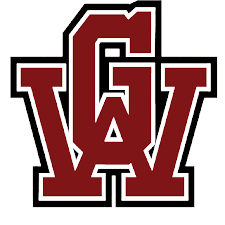
George Washington
(2nd Title)
Top goalscorer
Carter Phillips
(18 goals)

==== Team of the year ====

Coach: Mario Julian

==== Awards ====
Player Of The Year
Ramon Carvalho (George Washington)
Forward Of The Year
Michael Zutaut (Woodrow Wilson)
Midfielder Of The Year
Errin Baynes (Wheeling Park)
Defender Of The Year
Wes McWatters (Hurricane)
Keeper Of The Year
Cameron Allen (Wheeling Park)
Coach Of The Year
Mario Julian (Wheeling Park)

2012

==== 2012 ====
State semi-finals
Parkersburg | 1
George Washington | 0
Hurricane | 4
Hedgesville | 0

State Championship Game
Parkersburg | 0
Hurricane | 2

==== State semi-finals ====
November 6, 2012
10:00 GMT-4

| Parkersburg | 1-0 | George Washington |
|---|---|---|
| Garrett Kruger 8' |

Schoenbaum Stadium
November 6, 2012
12:00 GMT-4

| Hurricane | 4-0 | Hedgesville |
|---|---|---|
| Felipe Thompson 8'; Daniel McKnight 12'; Alex White 34'; Trevor Cunningham 65' |

Schoenbaum Stadium

==== State Championship Game ====
November 7, 2012
10:30 GMT-4

| Parkersburg | 0-2 | Hurricane |
|---|---|---|
| | | Felipe Thompson 33'; Alex White 50' |

Schoenbaum Stadium

Champion
Hurricane
(1st Title)
Top goalscorer
Felipe Thompson
(47 goals)

==== Team of the year ====

Coach: Mike Foster

==== Awards ====
Player Of The Year
Felipe Thompson (Hurricane)
Forward Of The Year
Preston Sheldon (Winfield)
Midfielder Of The Year
Evan Vega (Huntington)
Defender Of The Year
Josh Brining (Hedgesville)
Keeper Of The Year
Jared Messer (Spring Valley)
Coach Of The Year
Mike Foster (Winfield)

2013

==== 2013 ====
Regional Finals
Parkersburg | 1
Hurricane | 0
Winfield | 3
Huntington | 2
George Washington | 3
Woodrow Wilson | 0
Jefferson | 1
Buckhannon-Upshur | 0

State semi-finals
Parkersburg | 2
Winfield | 1
George Washington | 1
Jefferson | 0

State Championship Game
Parkersburg | 0
George Washington | 1

==== State semi-finals ====
November 8, 2013
10:00 GMT-4

| Parkersburg | 2-1 | Winfield |
|---|---|---|
| Evan Rhodes 56', 76' | | Jesse Rhodes 55' (pen.) |

YMCA Youth Sports Complex
November 8, 2013
12:00 GMT-4

| George Washington | 1-0 | Jefferson |
|---|---|---|
| Drew Davis 2' |

YMCA Youth Sports Complex

==== State Championship Game ====
November 9, 2013
10:30 GMT-4

| Parkersburg | 0-1 | George Washington |
|---|---|---|
| | | Peter Nelson 76' (pen.) |

YMCA Youth Sports Complex

Champion
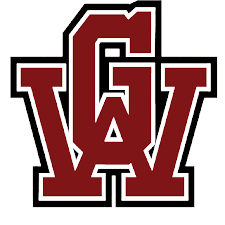
George Washington
(3rd Title)
Top goalscorer
Guillermo Ugarte
(33 goals)

==== Team of the year ====

Coach: Tom Hopper

==== Awards ====
Player Of The Year
Garrett Phillips (George Washington)
Forward Of The Year
Tristan Reid (Martinsburg)
Midfielder Of The Year
Evan Rhodes (Parkersburg)
Defender Of The Year
Devonyet Harris (South Charleston)
Keeper Of The Year
Reid Strobl (Parkersburg)
Coach Of The Year
Tom Hopper (George Washington)

2014

==== 2014 ====
Regional Finals
Morgantown | 3
Parkersburg | 2
Jefferson | 1
Buckhannon-Upshur | 0
George Washington | 3
Woodrow Wilson | 1
Spring Valley | 3
Winfield | 1

State semi-finals
Morgantown | 2
Jefferson | 0
George Washington | 3
Spring Valley | 0

State Championship Game
Morgantown | 3
George Washington | 1

==== State semi-finals ====
November 7, 2014
10:00 GMT-4

| Morgantown | 2-0 | Jefferson |
|---|---|---|
| Addison Luck 27'; Ben Vester 46' |

YMCA Youth Sports Complex
November 7, 2014
12:00 GMT-4

| George Washington | 3-0 | Spring Valley |
|---|---|---|
| Will Walker 15', 72'; Jeffrey Hodge 51' |

YMCA Youth Sports Complex

==== State Championship Game ====
November 8, 2014
10:30 GMT-4

| Morgantown | 3-1 | George Washington |
|---|---|---|
| Ben Vester 6'; Zach Kilwein 15', 16' | | Khegan McLane 61' |

YMCA Youth Sports Complex

Champion
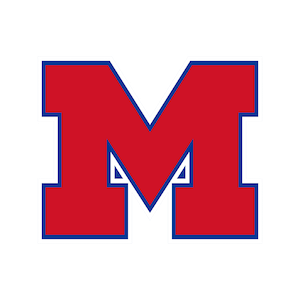
Morgantown
(4th Title)
Top goalscorer
Teo Garces
(23 goals)

==== Team of the year ====

Coach: Joe Melia

==== Awards ====
Player Of The Year
Tommy Logston (Parkersburg)
Forward Of The Year
Jonah Cosby (George Washington)
Midfielder Of The Year
Addison Luck (Morgantown)
Defender Of The Year
Noah Laliberty (Winfield)
Keeper Of The Year
Ryan Childers (George Washington)
Coach Of The Year
Joe Melia (Morgantown)

2015

==== 2015 ====
Regional Finals
Morgantown | 1
Parkersburg | 0
Ripley | 0
George Washington | 2
Winfield(a.e.t.) | 3
Huntington | 2
Washington | 3
Buckhannon-Upshur | 0

State semi-finals
Morgantown | 2
George Washington | 1
Winfield | 0
Washington | 2

State Championship Game
Morgantown | 3
Washington | 0

==== State semi-finals ====
November 6, 2015
10:00 GMT-4

| Morgantown | 2-1 | George Washington |
|---|---|---|
| Addison Luck 66'; Max Byron 72' | | Ahmed Mohammed 35' (pen.) |

YMCA Youth Sports Complex
November 6, 2015
12:00 GMT-4

| Winfield | 0-2 | Washington |
|---|---|---|
| | | Stone Sanders 38'; Samuel Vaira 71' |

YMCA Youth Sports Complex

==== State Championship Game ====
November 7, 2015
10:30 GMT-4

| Morgantown | 3-0 | Washington |
|---|---|---|
| Addison Luck 8'; Andrew Gamponia 19', 44' |

YMCA Youth Sports Complex

Champion
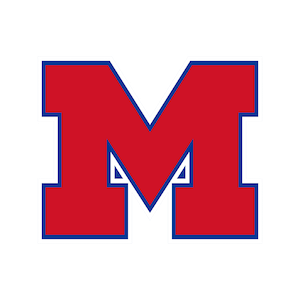
Morgantown
(5th Title)
Top goalscorer
Addison Luck
(31 goals)

==== Team of the year ====

Coach: Kevin Robins

==== Awards ====
Player Of The Year
Addison Luck (Morgantown)
Forward Of The Year
Josh Tenney (Buckhannon-Upshur)
Immanuel Opuka-Duah (Parkersburg)
Midfielder Of The Year
Tyler Shaffer (Capital)
Defender Of The Year
Nick Nestor (Wheeling Park)
Keeper Of The Year
Becker Junkin (Washington)
Coach Of The Year
Kevin Robins (Washington)

2016

==== 2016 ====
Regional Finals
University | 2
Wheeling Park | 0
Parkersburg | 3
Hurricane | 1
Jefferson | 3
Hedgesville | 0
George Washington | 6
Woodrow Wilson | 0

State semi-finals
University | 3
Parkersburg | 2
Jefferson | 1
George Washington | 5

State Championship Game
University | 0
George Washington | 4

==== State semi-finals ====
November 4, 2016
10:00 GMT-4

| University | 3-2 | Parkersburg |
|---|---|---|
| Joseph Biafora 32', 51', 110' | | Murad Hamirani 8'; Immanuel Opoku-Duah 52' |

YMCA Youth Sports Complex
November 4, 2016
12:00 GMT-4

| Jefferson | 1-5 | George Washington |
|---|---|---|
| Teo Garces 33' | | Caleb Creed 3'; Chance Anderson 48'; Ahmed Muhammed 53'; Cole Snyder 72'; Noah Shaak 85' |

YMCA Youth Sports Complex

==== State Championship Game ====
November 5, 2016
10:30 GMT-4

| University | 0-4 | George Washington |
|---|---|---|
| | | Josh Mabe 4'; Chance Anderson 37'; Matthew Brock 59' (o.g.); Noah Shaak 63' |

YMCA Youth Sports Complex

Champion
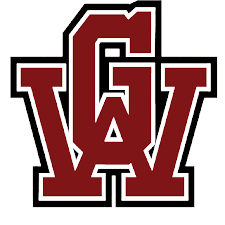
George Washington
(4th Title)
Top goalscorer
Teo Garces
(41 goals)

2017

==== 2017 ====
State semi-finals
Hedgesville | 0
Wheeling Park | 1
Hurricane | 2
George Washington | 1

State Championship Game
Wheeling Park | 0
Hurricane | 2

==== State semi-finals ====
November 2, 2017
10:00 GMT-4

| Hedgesville | 0–1 | Wheeling Park |
|---|---|---|
| | | David Aikan 38' |

YMCA Youth Sports Complex
November 2, 2017
12:00 GMT-4

| Hurricane | 2-1 | George Washington |
|---|---|---|
| Ryan Fisher 38'; Jackson Snavely 70' | | Bellfor Adam 56' |

YMCA Youth Sports Complex

==== State Championship Game ====
November 3, 2017
10:30 GMT-4

| Wheeling Park | 0-2 | Hurricane |
|---|---|---|
| | | Jackson Snavely 20', 59' |

YMCA Youth Sports Complex

Champion
Hurricane
(2nd Title)
Top goalscorer
Samuel Pierson
(43 goals)

2018

==== 2018 ====
Regional finals
Wheeling Park | 1
University | 7
George Washington | 3
Princeton | 2
Hedgesville | 1
Jefferson | 0
Ripley | 2
Hurricane | 3

State semi-finals
University | 1
George Washington | 2
Hedgesville | 1
Hurricane | 0

State Championship Game
George Washington | 2
Hedgesville | 0

==== State semi-finals ====
November 2, 2018
10:00 GMT-4

| University | 1-2 | George Washington |
|---|---|---|
| Brock Pickett 89' | | Noah Carney 58'; Chance Anderson 73' |

YMCA Youth Sports Complex
November 2, 2018
12:00 GMT-4

| Hedgesville | 1-0 | Hurricane |
|---|---|---|
| Anthony Lang 46' |

YMCA Youth Sports Complex

==== State Championship Game ====
November 3, 2018
10:30 GMT-4

| George Washington | 2-0 | Hedgesville |
|---|---|---|
| Noah Carney 24'; Zak Abdul-Jalil 55' |

YMCA Youth Sports Complex

Champion
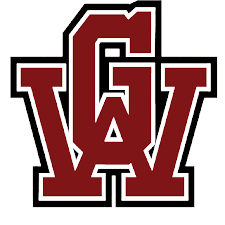
George Washington
(5th Title)
Top goalscorer
Joseph Biafora
(48 goals)

==== Team of the year ====

Coach: TBA

2019

==== 2019 ====
State semi-finals
University | 0(2)
Cabell Midland | 0(4)
Hedgesville | 0
George Washington | 3

State Championship Game
Cabell Midland | 0
George Washington | 2

==== State semi-finals ====
November 8, 2019
10:00 GMT-4

| University | 0–0 | Cabell Midland |
Penalties
| Justin Parsons (penalty missed); J.M. Jones (penalty missed); Drew Kemper (penalty scored); Riley Nett (penalty scored) | 2–4 | (penalty scored) Omar Baryun; (penalty scored) Ryan Holmes; (penalty scored) Joseph Sheils; (penalty scored) Garret Shields |

YMCA Youth Sports Complex
November 8, 2019
12:00 GMT-4

| Hedgesville | 0–3 | George Washington |
|---|---|---|
| | | Robert Nunley 17', 66'; Max Tretheway 73' |

YMCA Youth Sports Complex

==== State Championship Game ====
November 9, 2019
10:30 GMT-4

| Cabell Midland | 0-2 | George Washington |
|---|---|---|
| | | Zak Abdul-Jalil 2', 10' |

YMCA Youth Sports Complex

==== Team of the year ====

Coach:

Champion
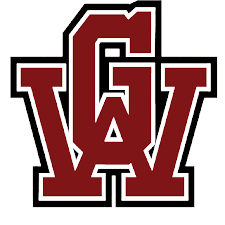
George Washington
(6th Title)
Top goalscorer
Broedy Boyce / Riley Nett
(28 goals)

2020

==== 2020 ====
State semi-finals
1 | George Washington | 1
4 | Jefferson | 0
2 | Cabell Midland | 1
3 | University | 2

State Championship Game
1 | George Washington | 5
3 | University | 0

==== State semi-finals ====
November 6, 2020
10:00 GMT-4

| George Washington | 1–0 | Jefferson |
|---|---|---|
| Michael Nate 26' |

YMCA Youth Sports Complex
November 6, 2020
12:00 GMT-4

| Cabell Midland | 1–2 | University |
|---|---|---|
| Ryan Holmes 36' (pen.) | | Isaac Lewis 38'; Riley Nett 70' |

YMCA Youth Sports Complex

==== State Championship Game ====
November 7, 2020
10:30 GMT-4

| George Washington | 5–0 | University |
|---|---|---|
| Tarek Jarrouj 5'; Michael Luechauer 19', 24'; Trethewey 27'; Connor Brumbaugh 24'; Sam Clark 64' |

YMCA Youth Sports Complex

Champion
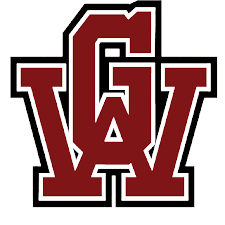
George Washington
(7th Title)
Top goalscorer
Coleman Meredith
(28 goals)

2021

==== 2021 ====
State semi-finals
1 | George Washington | 1
4 | Washington (a.e.t.) | 2
2 | Morgantown (a.e.t.) | 2
3 | Cabell Midland | 1

State Championship Game
4 | Washington | 0
2 | Morgantown | 2

==== State semi-finals ====
November 5, 2021
10:00 GMT-4

| George Washington | 1 – 2 (a.e.t.) | Washington |
|---|---|---|
| Nick Ihnat 26' | | Will Morgan 82' (pen.); Jack Walker 114' (a.e.t.) |

YMCA Youth Sports Complex
November 5, 2021
12:00 GMT-4

| Morgantown | 2 – 1 (a.e.t.) | Cabell Midland |
|---|---|---|
| Connor Brumbaugh 40'; Vivek Sriram 93' (a.e.t.) | | Holmes 63' |

YMCA Youth Sports Complex

==== State Championship Game ====
November 6, 2021
10:30 GMT-4

| Washington | 0–2 | Morgantown |
|---|---|---|
| | | Caden Carpenter 17'; Connor Brumbaugh 24' |

YMCA Youth Sports Complex

Champion
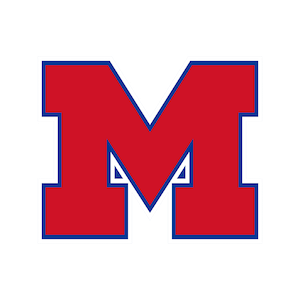
Morgantown
(6th Title)
Top goalscorer
Ryan Holmes
(32 goals)

==== Team of the year ====

Coach: Cody Freas

==== Awards ====
Player Of The Year
Nick Ihnat (George Washington)
Forward Of The Year
Tresz McLeod (Wheeling Park)
Midfielder Of The Year
Ryan Holmes (Cabell Midland)
Defender Of The Year
Sam Clark (George Washington)
Keeper Of The Year
Crosby Short (Spring Valley)
Coach Of The Year
Cody Freas (Hurricane)

2022

==== 2022 ====
State semi-finals
1 | Greenbrier East | 2
4 | Wheeling Park | 1
2 | Hurricane | 0
3 | Spring Mills | 3

State Championship Game
1 | Greenbrier East | 2
3 | Spring Mills | 0

==== State semi-finals ====
4 November 2022
10:00 GMT-4

| Greenbrier East | 2–1 | Wheeling Park |
|---|---|---|
| Chase Mizia 15' (pen.); Adam Seams 77' | | Wilson Hanna 18' |

YMCA Youth Sports Complex
4 November 2022
12:00 GMT-4

| Hurricane | 0–3 | Spring Mills |
|---|---|---|
| | | Isaiah Briggs 17', 75'; Joseph Reid 85' |

YMCA Youth Sports Complex

==== State championship game ====
5 November 2022
10:30 GMT-4

| Greenbrier East | 2–0 | Spring Mills |
|---|---|---|
| Adam Seams 55'; Luke Dolin 66' |

YMCA Youth Sports Complex

Champion
Greenbrier East
(1st Title)
Top goalscorer
Tresz McLeod
(35 goals)

==== Team of the year ====

Coach: Mario Julian

==== Awards ====
Player Of The Year
Sam Clark (George Washington)
Forward Of The Year
Luke Dolin (Greenbrier East)
Midfielder Of The Year
Chase Mizia (Greenbrier East)
Defender Of The Year
Adam Seams (Greenbrier East)
Keeper Of The Year
Joe Cochran (Greenbrier East)
Coach Of The Year
Mario Julian (Wheeling Park)

2023

==== 2023 ====
State semi-finals
1 | George Washington | 5
4 | Morgantown | 1
2 | Hurricane | 1
3 | Spring Mills | 0

State Championship Game
1 | George Washington | 1
2 | Hurricane | 0

==== State semi-finals ====
2 November 2023
17:30 GMT-4

| George Washington | 5–1 | Morgantown |
|---|---|---|
| Luechauer 10', 15' (pen.), 60'; CJ Knapper 33', 46' (pen.) | | Alexander Gonzalez-Tannon 10' |

YMCA Youth Sports Complex
2 November 2023
19:30 GMT-4

| Hurricane | 1–0 | Spring Mills |
|---|---|---|
| Jackson Willis’ 31' |

YMCA Youth Sports Complex

==== State championship game ====
4 November 2023
12:30 GMT-4

| George Washington | 1–0 | Hurricane |
|---|---|---|
| Luechauer 81' |

YMCA Youth Sports Complex

Champion
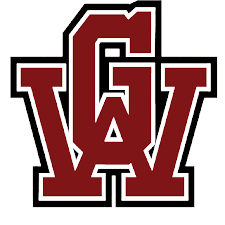
George Washington
(8th Title)
Top goalscorer
Brier Wagner
(45 goals)

==== Team of the year ====

Coach: Steve Larabra

==== Awards ====
Player Of The Year
Tresz McLeod (Wheeling Park)
Forward Of The Year
Isaiah Briggs (Spring Mills)
Midfielder Of The Year
Aiden Bell (Woodrow Wilson)
Defender Of The Year
Tyler Randolph (Woodrow Wilson)
Keeper Of The Year
Grayson Maddox (Hurricane)
Coach Of The Year
Steve Larabra (Woodrow Wilson)

2024

==== 2024 ====
Sectionals Finals
Hurricane | 7
Winfield | 1
Cabell Midland | 0
Huntington | 3
Spring Mills | 0
Martinsburg | 1
Washington | 1
Jefferson(a.e.t.) | 2
Wheeling Park(a.e.t.) | 1
Morgantown | 0
Bridgeport | 1
University(a.e.t.) | 2
George Washington | 4
South Charleston | 2
Woodrow Wilson | 3
Greenbrier East | 0

Regional Finals
Hurricane | 3
Huntington | 0
Martinsburg (a.e.t.) | 2
Jefferson | 1
Wheeling Park | 4
University | 3
George Washington | 0
Woodrow Wilson | 1

State semi-finals
Hurricane | 2
Martinsburg | 0
Wheeling Park | 2
Woodrow Wilson (a.e.t.) | 3

State Championship Game
Hurricane | 1
Woodrow Wilson | 2

===== Regionals Finals =====
October 29, 2024
17:00 GMT-4

| Hurricane | 3-0 | Huntington |
|---|---|---|
| Harris Coulter 8'; Peyton Gum 33'; Logan Flora 65' |

Hurricane H.S.
October 29, 2024
17:00 GMT-4

| Martinsburg | 2-1 (a.e.t.) | Jefferson |
|---|---|---|
| Sam Collins 19', 102' | | Deacon Fajemironkun 82' |

Washington H.S.
October 29, 2024
17:00 GMT-4

| Wheeling Park | 4-3 | University |
|---|---|---|
| Sam Rockey 1'; Graham Loy 7'; Tresz McLeod 39'; Wilson Hanna 47' | | Pierre Kpegba 52'; Nate Lindsay 58'; Davion Huckaby 74' |

John Marshall H.S.
October 29, 2024
17:00 GMT-4

| George Washington | 0-1 | Woodrow Wilson |
|---|---|---|
| | | Coby Dillon 15' |

Woodrow Wilson H.S.

===== State semi-finals =====
November 7, 2024
10:00 GMT-4

| Hurricane | 2-0 | Martinsburg |
|---|---|---|
| Kellon Schmidt 3'; Zayden Ambrose 10' |

YMCA Youth Sports Complex
November 7, 2024
12:00 GMT-4

| Wheeling Park | 2-3 (a.e.t.) | Woodrow Wilson |
|---|---|---|
| Tresz Mcleod 61' (pen.); Graham Loy 77' | | Coby Dillon 30', 50' (pen.): A.J. Bishop 116' |

YMCA Youth Sports Complex

===== State Championship Game =====
November 9, 2024
13:30 GMT-4

| Hurricane | 1-2 | Woodrow Wilson |
|---|---|---|
| Jack Willis 9' | | Coby Dillon 18'; Hagen Hall 80' |

YMCA Youth Sports Complex

Champion
Woodrow Wilson
(4th Title)
Top goalscorer
Tresz McLeod
(39 goals)

==== Team of the year ====

Coach:Steve Larabra

==== Awards ====
Player Of The Year
Tresz McLeod (Wheeling Park)
Forward Of The Year
TBD
Midfielder Of The Year
TBD
Defender Of The Year
TBD
Keeper Of The Year
TBD
Coach Of The Year
Steve Larabra (Woodrow Wilson)

AA-A

2008

==== 2008 ====
State semi-finals
Pocahontas County | 2
1
Weir | 6
Berkeley Springs | 8

State Championship Game
Pocahontas County | 2
Berkeley Springs | 5

===== State Championship Game =====
November 8, 2008
13:30 GMT-4

| Pocahontas County | 2-5 | Berkeley Springs |
|---|---|---|
| J.D. 8'; Austin Garry 72' | | Jake Wise 6', 15'; Josh Wise 45', 63', 84' |

YMCA Paul Cline Memorial Youth Sports Complex.

Champion
Berkeley Springs
(1st Title)
Top goalscorer
Josh Wise
(110 goals)

==== Team of the year ====

Coaches: Mike Burns & Gary Matheney

==== Awards ====
Forward Of The Year
Josh Wise (Berkeley Springs)
Midfielder Of The Year
Matt Martin (Berkeley Springs)
Defender Of The Year
Jesse Bolyard (Pocahontas County)
Keeper Of The Year
Jeff Fertig (Pocahontas County)
Coach Of The Year
Mike Burns (Pocahontas County) & Gary Matheney (Sissonville)

2009

==== 2009 ====
State semi-finals
Weir | 1
PikeView | 0
Grafton | 1
Charleston Catholic | 3

State Championship Game
Weir | 2
Charleston Catholic | 4

==== Team of the year ====

Coach: Keith Hutcheson

==== Awards ====
Player Of The Year
Chad Ford (Weir)
Forward Of The Year
Tommy Trupo (Charleston Catholic)
Midfielder Of The Year
Cole Gurtis (Ravenswood)
Defender Of The Year
Jesse Bolyard (Pocahontas County)
Keeper Of The Year
Jerry Simonin (Pocahontas County)
Coach Of The Year
Keith Hutcheson (Charleston Catholic)

2010

==== 2010 ====
State semi-finals
Weir | 0
Oak Hill | 1
Grafton | 0
Charleston Catholic | 3

State Championship Game
Oak Hill | 1
Charleston Catholic | 4

==== Team of the year ====

Coaches: Steve Cogar & Jamie Chenoweth

==== Awards ====
Player Of The Year
Tommy Trupo (Charleston Catholic)
Forward Of The Year
John Scritchfield (Ravenswood)
Midfielder Of The Year
Jeffery Merrifield (Trinity Christian)
Defender Of The Year
L.J. Stanley (Charleston Catholic)
Keeper Of The Year
Brady Reymond (Point Pleasant)
Coach Of The Year
Steve Cogar (Ravenswood) & Jamie Chenoweth (Berkeley Springs)

2011

==== 2011 ====
State semi-finals
Weir | 2
Sissonville | 1
Grafton | 0
Charleston Catholic | 5

State Championship Game
Weir | 0
Charleston Catholic | 6

==== Team of the year ====

Coach: Sam Hill

==== Awards ====
Player Of The Year
Tommy Trupo (Charleston Catholic)
Forward Of The Year
Jeff Merrifield (Trinity Christian)
Midfielder Of The Year
Adam Fox (Charleston Catholic)
Defender Of The Year
Matt Goldberg (Charleston Catholic)
Keeper Of The Year
Brady Reymond (Point Pleasant)
Coach Of The Year
Sam Hill (Pikeview)

2012

==== 2012 ====
State semi-finals
Fairmont Senior | 2
Grafton | 1
Weir | 0
Charleston Catholic | 2

State Championship Game
Fairmont Senior | 0
Charleston Catholic | 5

==== Team of the year ====

Coach: Sam Fox

==== Awards ====
Player Of The Year
Sam Revercomb (Charleston Catholic)
Forward Of The Year
Zach Wise (Berkeley Springs)
Midfielder Of The Year
Jesse Roman (East Fairmont)
Defender Of The Year
Trevor Moon (Bridgeport)
Keeper Of The Year
Garrett Butler (Williamstown)
Coach Of The Year
Sam Fox (Charleston Catholic)

2013

==== 2013 ====
State semi-finals
Weir | 1
East Fairmont | 2
PikeView | 3
Charleston Catholic | 1

State Championship Game
East Fairmont | 0
PikeView | 1

==== Team of the year ====

Coach: Fred Roman

==== Awards ====
Player Of The Year
Phil Chafin (Notre Dame)
Co-Forward Of The Year
Joey Trupo (Charleston Catholic) & Chaz Rodeheaver (Robert C. Byrd)
Midfielder Of The Year
Joey Reese (Bridgeport)
Co-Defender Of The Year
Alex Testerman (Pikeview) & Lucas Gocke (Charleston Catholic)
Keeper Of The Year
Brett Metheny (East Fairmont)
Coach Of The Year
Fred Roman (East Fairmont)

2014

==== 2014 ====
State semi-finals
Weir | 7
Grafton | 2
PikeView | 0
Charleston Catholic | 3

State Championship Game
Weir | 1
Charleston Catholic | 2

==== Team of the year ====

Coach: Bryant McCarthy

==== Awards ====
Player Of The Year
Phil Chafin (Notre Dame)
Forward Of The Year
Joey Trupo (Charleston Catholic)
Midfielder Of The Year
Colin Harvath (East Fairmont)
Defender Of The Year
Jason Weitzel (Pikeview)
Keeper Of The Year
Trace Schooley (Grafton)
Coach Of The Year
Bryant McCarthy (Grafton)

2015

==== 2015 ====
State semi-finals
Fairmont Senior | 4
Bluefield | 0
Grafton | 0
Charleston Catholic | 2

State Championship Game
Fairmont Senior | 3
Charleston Catholic | 2

==== Team of the year ====

Coach: Bryant McCarthy

==== Awards ====
Co-Player Of The Year
Colin Harvath (East Fairmont) & Joey Trupo (Charleston Catholic)
Forward Of The Year
Nate Hugh (St. Joseph)
Midfielder Of The Year
Federico Perez (Tyler Consolidated)
Defender Of The Year
Ben McKeen (Notre Dame)
Keeper Of The Year
Brett Strickland (Herbert Hoover)
Coach Of The Year
Bryant McCarthy (Grafton)

2016

==== 2016 ====
State semi-finals
East Fairmont | 1
Nitro | 0
Robert C. Byrd | 2
Charleston Catholic | 0

State Championship Game
East Fairmont | 3
Robert C. Byrd | 2

2017

==== 2017 ====
Regional Finals
Weir | 0(4)
East Fairmont | 0(3)
Robert C. Byrd | 2
Lewis County | 1
Charleston Catholic | 1
Oak Hill | 0
Nitro | 2
Winfield | 1

State semi-finals
Weir | 1
Robert C. Byrd | 2
Charleston Catholic | 0(4)
Nitro | 0(5)

State Championship Game
Robert C. Byrd | 1
Nitro | 2

2018

==== 2018 ====
Regional Finals
Wheeling Central Catholic | 0
East Fairmont | 9
Charleston Catholic | 1
Oak Hill | 0
Robert C. Byrd | 3
Lewis County | 0
Williamstown | 0
Winfield | 3

State semi-finals
East Fairmont | 3
Charleston Catholic | 2
Robert C. Byrd | 0
Winfield | 2

State Championship Game
East Fairmont | 1
Winfield | 3

==== Team of the year ====

Coach: TBA

2019

==== 2019 ====
State semi-finals
Fairmont Senior | 2
Winfield | 1
Robert C. Byrd | 4
Charleston Catholic | 0

State Championship Game
Fairmont Senior(a.e.t.) | 2
Robert C. Byrd | 1

==== Team of the year ====

Coach: TBA

2020

==== 2020 ====
State semi-finals
1 | Fairmont Senior | 8
4 | Herbert Hoover | 1
2 | Charleston Catholic | 1(4)
3 | Point Pleasant | 1(2)

State Championship Game
1 | Fairmont Senior | 3
2 | Charleston Catholic | 2

2021

==== 2021 ====
State semi-finals
1 | Point Pleasant | 2
4 | Herbert Hoover | 0
2 | Charleston Catholic | 2
3 | Fairmont Senior | 1

State Championship Game
1 | Point Pleasant | 3
2 | Charleston Catholic(a.e.t.) | 4

2022

==== 2022 ====
State semi-finals
1 | Charleston Catholic | 1
4 | Grafton | 0
2 | Fairmont Senior | 0
3 | Point Pleasant | 3

State Championship Game
1 | Charleston Catholic(a.e.t.) | 4
3 | Point Pleasant | 3

2023

==== 2023 ====
State semi-finals
1 | Point Pleasant | 4
4 | Wheeling Central Catholic | 0
2 | Charleston Catholic | 1
3 | Lewis County | 0

State Championship Game
1 | Point Pleasant | 1(4)
3 | Charleston Catholic | 1(3)

==== Team of the year ====

Coache: Dan Lohman

2024

==== 2024 ====
State semi-finals
1 | Charleston Catholic | 8
4 | Grafton | 0
2 | East Fairmont | 2
3 | Point Pleasant | 1

State Championship Game
1 | Charleston Catholic | 1
3 | East Fairmont | 0

==== Team of the year ====

Coach: TBA

=== List of champions ===
Below are the list of champions and runners-up of the West Virginia High School Boys' Soccer State Tournament:

| Season | Class | Winner | Runner-up | Result |
|---|---|---|---|---|
| 2008 | AAA | Parkersburg (5) | Wheeling Park | 2-0 |
| 2008 | AA-A | Berkeley Springs (1) | Pocahontas County | 5-2 |
| 2009 | AAA | Parkersburg (6) | Woodrow Wilson | 2-0 |
| 2009 | AA-A | Charleston Catholic (1) | Weir | 4-2 |
| 2010 | AAA | Woodrow Wilson (3) | Wheeling Park | 1-0 |
| 2010 | AA-A | Charleston Catholic (2) | Oak Hill | 4-1 |
| 2011 | AAA | George Washington (2) | Washington | 5-2 |
| 2011 | AA-A | Charleston Catholic (3) | Weir | 6-0 |
| 2012 | AAA | Hurricane (1) | Parkersburg | 2-0 |
| 2012 | AA-A | Charleston Catholic (4) | Fairmont Senior | 5-0 |
| 2013 | AAA | George Washington (3) | Parkersburg | 1-0 |
| 2013 | AA-A | PikeView (1) | East Fairmont | 1-0 |
| 2014 | AAA | Morgantown (4) | George Washington | 3-1 |
| 2014 | AA-A | Charleston Catholic (5) | Weir | 2-1 |
| 2015 | AAA | Morgantown (5) | Washington | 3-0 |
| 2015 | AA-A | Fairmont Sr. (1) | Charleston Catholic | 3-2 |
| 2016 | AAA | George Washington (4) | University | 4-0 |
| 2016 | AA-A | East Fairmont (1) | Robert C Byrd | 3-2 |
| 2017 | AAA | Hurricane (2) | Wheeling Park | 2-0 |
| 2017 | AA-A | Nitro (2) | Robert C Byrd | 2-1 |
| 2018 | AAA | George Washington (5) | Hedgesville | 2-0 |
| 2018 | AA-A | Winfield (1) | East Fairmont | 3-1 |
| 2019 | AAA | George Washington (6) | Cabell Midland | 2-0 |
| 2019 | AA-A | Fairmont Sr. (2) | Robert C Byrd | 2-1 |
| 2020 | AAA | George Washington (7) | University | 5-0 |
| 2020 | AA-A | Fairmont Sr. (3) | Charleston Catholic | 3-2 |
| 2021 | AAA | Morgantown (6) | Washington | 2-0 |
| 2021 | AA-A | Charleston Catholic (6) | Point Pleasant | 4-3(a.e.t.) |
| 2022 | AAA | Greenbrier East (1) | Spring Mills | 2-0 |
| 2022 | AA-A | Charleston Catholic (7) | Point Pleasant | 4-3(a.e.t.) |
| 2023 | AAA | George Washington (8) | Hurricane | 1-0 |
| 2023 | AA-A | Point Pleasant (1) | Charleston Catholic | 1(4)-1(3) |
| 2024 | AAA | Woodrow Wilson (4) | Hurricane | 2-1 |
| 2024 | AA-A | Charleston Catholic (8) | East Fairmont | 1-0 |

== Three-class system (AAAA, AAA, AA-A) 2025–present ==
=== State Tournament by year ===
AAAA

2025

==== 2025 ====
Sectionals Finals
Woodrow Wilson | 4
Parkersburg South | 0
George Washington | 4
Cabell Midland | 0
Hedgesville | 3
Washington | 2
Spring Mills | 1
Morgantown | 6
Wheeling Park | 6
Jefferson | 1
Martinsburg | 1(4)
Musselman | 1(5)
Huntington | 3
Parkersburg | 0
Oak Hill | 0
Hurricane | 5

Regional Finals
Woodrow Wilson | 6
George Washington | 1
Hedgesville | 0
Morgantown | 3
Wheeling Park | 3
Musselman | 1
Huntington | 0
Hurricane | 4

State semi-finals
1 | Woodrow Wilson | 4
4 | Morgantown | 1
2 | Wheeling Park | 1
3 | Hurricane | 4

State Championship Game
1 | Woodrow Wilson | 1(1)
3 | Hurricane | 1(3)

==== State semi-finals ====
6 November 2025
10:00 GMT-4

| Woodrow Wilson | 4–1 | Morgantown |
|---|---|---|
| Johnathan Scott 15'; Coby Dillon 25'; Dylan Basconi 46'; Vince Umberger 47' | | Ray Hannif 75' |

YMCA Youth Sports Complex
6 November 2025
12:30 GMT-4

| Wheeling Park | 1–4 | Hurricane |
|---|---|---|
| Wilson Hanna 25' | | Connor Jackson 49', 66'; Blake Benson 54'; Landon Stonestreet 68' |

YMCA Youth Sports Complex

==== State championship game ====
8 November 2025
10:30 GMT-4

| Woodrow Wilson | 1–1 | Hurricane |
|---|---|---|
| Hagen Hall 57' | | Harris Coulter 87' |
Penalties
| Coby Dillon (penalty missed); Ali Farghaly (penalty missed); Tyler Radford (penalty missed); Jackson Schroeder (penalty scored) | 1–3 | (penalty scored) Landon Stonestreet; (penalty scored) Jack Willis; (penalty missed) Payton Gum; (penalty missed) Gavin Vance; (penalty scored) Harris Coulter |

YMCA Youth Sports Complex

Champion
Hurricane
(3rd Title)
Top goalscorer
Landen Deuley
(30 goals)

==== Team of the year ====

Coach:Steve Larabra

==== Awards ====
Player Of The Year
Tresz McLeod (Wheeling Park)
Forward Of The Year
TBD
Midfielder Of The Year
TBD
Defender Of The Year
TBD
Keeper Of The Year
TBD
Coach Of The Year
Steve Larabra (Woodrow Wilson)

AAA

2025

==== 2025 ====
Sectionals Finals
Nitro | 4
Point Pleasant | 1
Spring Valley | 2
Winfield | 1
East Fairmont | 3
North Marion | 2
Fairmont Senior | 1(5)
Grafton | 1(6)
Bridgeport | 3
Hampshire | 0
Elkins | 2
Robert C. Byrd | 4
Princeton | 2(3)
Ripley | 2(2)
Shady Spring | 2
Greenbrier East | 6

Regional Finals
Nitro | 2
Spring Valley | 0
East Fairmont | 1(3)
Grafton | 1(4)
Bridgeport | 4
Robert C. Byrd | 0
Princeton | 0
Greenbrier East | 3

State semi-finals
1 | Nitro | 4
4 | Grafton | 0
2 | Bridgeport(a.e.t.) | 2
3 | Greenbrier East | 1

State Championship Game
1 | Nitro | 1
2 | Bridgeport | 3

==== State semi-finals ====
6 November 2025
16:00 GMT-4

| Nitro | 4–0 | Grafton |
|---|---|---|
| Bodie Jordan 40', 47'; Kaden Shaffer 77'; Terren Walker 88' |

YMCA Youth Sports Complex
6 November 2025
19:00 GMT-4

| Bridgeport | 2–1 (a.e.t.) | Greenbrier East |
|---|---|---|
| Eli Terebus 38'; Riel Figueroa 100' | | Andrew Holt 8' |

YMCA Youth Sports Complex

==== State championship game ====
8 November 2025
12:00 GMT-4

| Nitro | 1–3 | Bridgeport |
|---|---|---|
| Bodie Jordan 14' | | Phillip Nguyen 12'; Riel Figueroa 62', 87' |

YMCA Youth Sports Complex

Champion
Bridgeport
(1st Title)
Top goalscorer
Bodie Jordan
(51 goals)

==== Team of the year ====

Region 1 Coach: Ian Hayhurst
Region 2 Coach: Keith Dumas

AA-A

==== 2025 ====
Sectionals Finals
St. Joseph Central | 13
Logan | 0
Sissonville | 2
Buffalo | 0
Sherman | 2
Bluefield | 0
Webster County | 0
Braxton County | 9
Wheeling Central Catholic | 7
Wood County Christian | 1
Weir | 2
Williamstown | 3
Trinity Christian | 2
Moorefield | 1
Petersburg | 0
Frankfort | 2

Regional Finals
St. Joseph Central | 10
Sissonville | 0
Sherman | 0
Braxton County | 6
Wheeling Central Catholic | 5
Williamstown | 0
Trinity Christian | 3(6)
Frankfort | 3(7)

State semi-finals
1 | St. Joseph Central | 6
4 | Braxton County | 0
2 | Wheeling Central Catholic | 3
3 | Frankfort | 0

State Championship Game
1 | St. Joseph Central | 4
2 | Wheeling Central Catholic | 0

==== State semi-finals ====
5 November 2025
10:00 GMT-4

| St. Joseph Central | 6–0 | Braxton County |

Cline Stadium
5 November 2025
12:30 GMT-4

| Wheeling Central Catholic | 3–0 | Frankfort |
|---|---|---|
| Luke Magruder 61'; JD Schoolcraf 66'; Mason Smith 67' |

Cline Stadium

==== State championship game ====
7 November 2025
10:30 GMT-4

| St. Joseph Central | 4–0 | Wheeling Central Catholic |
|---|---|---|
| Brier Wagner 38', 78'; Liam Templeton 60', 83' |

Cline Stadium

Champion
St. Joseph Central
(2nd Title)
Top goalscorer
Zack McQuain
(61 goals)

==== Team of the year ====

Coach: Kevin Mercer / Brian Komorowski

2025

=== List of champions ===
Below are the list of champions and runners-up of the West Virginia High School Boys' Soccer State Tournament:

| Season | Class | Winner | Runner-up | Result |
|---|---|---|---|---|
| 2025 | AAAA | Hurricane(3) | Woodrow Wilson | 1(3)-1(1) |
| 2025 | AAA | Bridgeport(1) | Nitro | 3-1 |
| 2025 | AA-A | St. Joseph Central(2) | Wheeling Central Catholic | 4-0 |

== Statistics ==
=== Most titles timeline ===
==== Titles by club ====
| Club | Winners | Runners-up | Winning years |
|---|---|---|---|
| Charleston Catholic | 8 | 4 | 2009(AA-A), 2010(AA-A), 2011(AA-A), 2012(AA-A), 2014(AA-A), 2021(AA-A), 2022(AA-A), 2024(AA-A) |
| George Washington | 8 | 2 | 2007, 2011(AAA), 2013(AAA), 2016(AAA), 2018(AAA), 2019(AAA), 2020(AAA), 2023(AAA) |
| Parkersburg | 6 | 4 | 1996, 1997, 2005, 2006, 2008(AAA), 2009(AAA) |
| Morgantown | 6 | 3 | 1989, 1999, 2000, 2014(AAA), 2015(AAA), 2021(AAA) |
| Woodrow Wilson | 4 | 4 | 2002, 2004, 2010(AAA), 2024(AAA) |
| Hurricane | 3 | 3 | 2012(AAA), 2017(AAA), 2025(AAAA) |
| Fairmont Senior | 3 | 0 | 2015(AA-A), 2019(AA-A), 2020(AA-A) |
| Capital | 3 | 0 | 1992, 1998, 2003 |
| Buckhannon-Upshur | 3 | 0 | 1993, 1994, 1995 |
| St. Joseph Central | 2 | 5 | 1988, 2025(AA-A) |
| Wheeling Park | 2 | 4 | 1991, 2001 |
| Nitro | 2 | 1 | 1990, 2017(AA-A) |
| East Fairmont | 1 | 3 | 2016(AA-A) |
| Point Pleasant | 1 | 2 | 2023(AA-A) |
| Bridgeport | 1 | 0 | 2025(AAA) |
| Greenbrier East | 1 | 0 | 2022(AAA) |
| Winfield | 1 | 0 | 2018(AA-A) |
| PikeView | 1 | 0 | 2013(AA-A) |
| Berkeley Springs | 1 | 0 | 2008(AA-A) |

==== Most appearances ====
As of 2025 season

Below is the list of clubs that have more appearances in the West Virginia High School Boys' Soccer State Tournament.

| Club | App | First | Last |
|---|---|---|---|
| Charleston Catholic | 19 | 1999 | 2024 |
| George Washington | 15 | 1993 | 2023 |
| Morgantown | 12 | 1988 | 2025 |
| Wheeling Park | 11 | 1991 | 2025 |
| Parkersburg | 11 | 1995 | 2016 |
| Grafton | 10 | 2008 | 2025 |
| Hurricane | 9 | 2007 | 2025 |
| Woodrow Wilson | 8 | 1996 | 2025 |
| Fairmont Senior | 8 | 2005 | 2022 |
| Weir | 8 | 2008 | 2017 |
| St. Joseph Central | 7 | 1988 | 2025 |
| Jefferson | 6 | 2006 | 2020 |
| Point Pleasant | 5 | 2020 | 2024 |
| Hedgesville | 5 | 2012 | 2019 |
| Nitro | 4 | 1990 | 2025 |
| Martinsburg | 4 | 2005 | 2024 |
| Robert C. Byrd | 4 | 2016 | 2019 |
| University | 4 | 2016 | 2020 |
| Washington | 4 | 2010 | 2021 |
| Winfield | 4 | 2013 | 2019 |
| Capital | 4 | 1992 | 2005 |
| East Fairmont | 3 | 2013 | 2024 |
| Cabell Midland | 3 | 2019 | 2021 |
| PikeView | 3 | 2009 | 2014 |
| Buckhannon-Upshur | 3 | 1993 | 1995 |
| Greenbrier East | 2 | 2022 | 2025 |
| Spring Valley | 2 | 2014 | 2023 |
| Spring Mills | 2 | 2022 | 2023 |
| Herbert Hoover | 2 | 2018 | 2019 |
| Wheeling Central Catholic | 2 | 2023 | 2025 |
| Bridgeport | 1 | 2025 | 2025 |
| Braxton | 1 | 2025 | 2025 |
| Frankfort | 1 | 2025 | 2025 |
| Lewis County | 1 | 2023 | 2023 |
| Bluefield | 1 | 2015 | 2015 |
| Sissonville | 1 | 2011 | 2011 |
| Oak Hill | 1 | 2010 | 2010 |
| Berkeley Springs | 1 | 2008 | 2008 |
| Pocahontas County | 1 | 2008 | 2008 |
| Parkersburg South | 1 | 2000 | 2000 |
| Brooke | 1 | 1994 | 1994 |

=== Team Records ===
==== Most Championships ====
- George Washington, with 8 championships (1 Unify + 7 AAA)
- Charleston Catholic, with 8 championships (8 AA-A)

==== Most Consecutive Championships ====
- Unify - Buckhannon-Upshur, with 3 consecutive championships (1993–1995)
- AAA - George Washington, with 3 consecutive championships (2018–2020)
- AA/A - Charleston Catholic, with 4 consecutive championships (2009–2012)

==== Most Finals Appearances ====
- Unify - St. Joseph Central, with 6 appearances
- AAA - George Washington and Parkersburg, with 10 appearances
- AA/A - Charleston Catholic, with 12 appearances

==== Most Consecutive Finals Appearances ====
- Unify - St. Joseph Central, with 5 consecutive appearances (1988–1992)
- AAAA/AAA - Hurricane High, with 4 consecutive appearances (2023–2026)
- AA/A - Charleston Catholic, with 4 consecutive appearances (2020–2024)

==== Most State Tournament Appearances ====
- Charleston Catholic, with 19 State Tournament Appearances

==== Most Consecutive State Tournament Appearances ====
- George Washington, with 11 Consecutive State Tournament Appearances (2011–2021)

==== Team With Most Appearances on Team Of The Year ====
- Charleston Catholic, with 66 players appearances on Team Of The Year (Note: Team Of The Year is considered the first team all-state)

==== Biggest Final Win ====
- Unify - Morgantown, 4-0 against Charleston Catholic (1999)
- AAA - George Washington, 5-0 against University (2020)
- AA/A - Charleston Catholic, 6-0 against Weir (2011)

==== Biggest Tournament Win ====
- Unify - Morgantown, 4-0 against Charleston Catholic Championship game (1999)
- AAAA - Woodrow Wilson, 4-1 against Morgantown semi-finals (2025) and Hurricane, 4-1 against Wheeling Park semi-finals (2025)
- AAA - George Washington, 5-0 against University Championship game (2020)
- AA/A - Charleston Catholic, 8-0 against Grafton semi-finals (2024)

==== Team With Most Player Of The Year Award ====
- Morgantown, with 5 Players Of The Year (1997, 1998, 1999, 2000, 2001, 2015)

==== Team With Most Forward Of The Year Award ====
- Buckhannon-Upshur, with 5 Forwards Of The Year (1995, 1996, 1997, 2000, 2015)

==== Team With Most Midfielder Of The Year Award ====
- Woodrow Wilson, with 4 Midfielders Of The Year (1997, 2004, 2007, 2023)

==== Team With Most Defender Of The Year Award ====
- Parkersburg, with 5 Defenders Of The Year (1999, 2004, 2005, 2006, 2007)
- Charleston Catholic, with 5 Defenders Of The Year (2005, 2007, 2010, 2011, 2013)

==== Team With Most Keeper Of The Year Award ====
- Parkersburg, with 5 Keepers Of The Year (1996, 1997, 2006, 2007, 2013)

==== Team With Most Coach Of The Year Award ====
- Morgantown, with 5 Coaches Of The Year (1995, 1997, 1999, 2000, 2014)

=== Individual Records ===
Players career is maximum of 4 seasons - Freshman (1st year), Sophomore (2nd year), Junior (3rd year), and Senior (4th year).

==== Player With Most Titles ====
- Gabe Sadorra, with 3 state titles for George Washington (2018, 2019, 2020)
- Max Trethewey, with 3 state titles for George Washington (2018, 2019, 2020)
- Bakar Boustany, with 3 state titles for George Washington (2018, 2019, 2020)
- Wilson Fife, with 3 state titles for George Washington (2018, 2019, 2020)
- Xavier Bohn, with 3 state titles for George Washington (2018, 2019, 2020)
- Zak Abdul-Jalil, with 3 state titles for George Washington (2016, 2018, 2019)
- Bryce Coleman, with 3 state titles for George Washington (2016, 2018, 2019)
- Spencer Griffey, with 3 state titles for Parkersburg (2006, 2008, 2009)
- Zach Higginbotham, with 3 state titles for Parkersburg (2006, 2008, 2009)
- Matt Brooks, with 3 state titles for Parkersburg (2006, 2008, 2009)
- David Amos, with 3 state titles for Parkersburg (2006, 2008, 2009)
- Scott Mcclure, with 3 state titles for Parkersburg (2006, 2008, 2009)
- Evan Davis, with 3 state titles for Parkersburg (2006, 2008, 2009)
- Adam Alleman, with 3 state titles for Parkersburg (2006, 2008, 2009)
- Jordan Alleman, with 3 state titles for Parkersburg (2006, 2008, 2009)
- Matt Sellers, with 3 state titles for Parkersburg (2006, 2008, 2009)
- Sean Mccloskey, with 3 state titles for Parkersburg (2006, 2008, 2009)
- Derick Craft, with 3 state titles for Parkersburg (2005, 2006, 2008)
- Tommy Kerns, with 3 state titles for Parkersburg (2005, 2006, 2008)
- Kieran Spader, with 3 state titles for Parkersburg (2005, 2006, 2008)-->

==== Coach With Most Titles ====
- Don Fosselman, with 6 state titles for Parkersburg (1996, 1997, 2005, 2006, 2008, 2009)

==== Coach With Most Finals ====
- Don Fosselman, with 10 state finals for Parkersburg (1995, 1996, 1997, 2004, 2005, 2006, 2008, 2009, 2012, 2013)

==== Players With Most Appearances on Team Of The Year ====
- Tresz McLeod, with 4 appearances on Team Of The Year for Wheeling Park (2021, 2022, 2023, 2024) (Note: Team Of The Year is considered the first team all-state)

==== Only Goalkeeper to win Player Of The Year ====
- Garrett Phillips for George Washington (2013) (Note: Team Of The Year is considered the first team all-state)

==== Only Freshmans to Appear on Team Of The Year ====
Note: (Note: Team Of The Year is considered the first team all-state)

- Ethan Lake for Robert C. Byrd (2024)
- Tresz McLeod for Wheeling Park (2021)

==== Only Player to Appear on Team Of The Year in Different Position ====
- Devin McCreery as a Goalkeeper for Morgantown in 1997 and as a Forward for Morgantown in 1998

==== Player With Most Player Of The Year Award ====
- Phil Chafin, with 2 Player Of The Year Award for Notre Dame (2013, 2014)
- Brian Runyon, with 2 Player Of The Year Award for Parkersburg (2010, 2011)
- Tommy Trupo, with 2 Player Of The Year Award for Charleston Catholic (2010, 2011)

==== Player With Most Forward Of The Year Award ====
- Joey Trupo, with 2 Forward Of The Year Award for Charleston Catholic (2013 (Note: Joey won Co-Forward of the year in 2013), 2014)

==== Player With Most Defender Of The Year Award ====
- Wes McWatters, with 2 Defender Of The Year Award for Hurricane (2010, 2011)
- Jesse Bolyard, with 2 Defender Of The Year Award for Pocahontas County (2008, 2009)

==== Player With Most Keeper Of The Year Award ====
- Brady Reymond, with 2 Keeper Of The Year Award for Point Pleasant (2010, 2011)
- Noah Blackhurst, with 2 Keeper Of The Year Award for Hurricane (2008, 2009)
- Brent McGee, with 2 Keeper Of The Year Award for Parkersburg (2006, 2007)
- Jordan Yost, with 2 Keeper Of The Year Award for Woodrow Wilson (2003, 2004)
- Matt Lutman, with 2 Keeper Of The Year Award for Morgantown (2001, 2002)
- Ryan Lewellyn, with 2 Keeper Of The Year Award for Parkersburg (1996, 1997)

==== Coach With Most Coach Of The Year Award ====
- Mario Julian, with 4 Coach Of The Year Award for Wheeling Park (2001, 2010, 2011, 2022)
- Ray Petrisin, with 4 Coach Of The Year Award for Morgantown (1995, 1997, 1999, 2000)

=== Professional Players ===
Some players that played in the AAA West Virginia High School Boys' Soccer State Tournament played at professional clubs:

- Zak Boggs, played at Parkersburg
- Chase Harrison played at Huntington
- Ramon Carvalho played at George Washington
- Collin Mocyunas played at University
