= West Virginia High School Women's Soccer State Tournament (AAA) =

US high school soccer tournament

AAA West Virginia High School Women's Soccer State
- Founded: 1995; 31 years ago
- Country: United States
- Confederation: WVSSAC
- Number of clubs: 4
- Current champions: Morgantown (4th title) (2023)
- Most championships: Winfield (7 titles)
- Website: WVSSAC Official website

The AAA West Virginia High School Women's Soccer State Tournament is an annual postseason soccer tournament held in West Virginia, United States. The tournament is open to all high school women's soccer teams that compete in the state's AAA classification, which is the largest division in West Virginia high school soccer. The tournament is organized by the West Virginia Secondary School Activities Commission (WVSSAC).

== History ==
The AAA West Virginia High School Women's Soccer State Tournament was first held in 1995. The tournament was created to provide an opportunity for the state's top high school women's soccer teams to compete against each other in a postseason format. From 1995 until 2007 the schools where in an unified system, meaning all schools played at the same level. From 2008 until now, the schools were divided in two classes: AAA (schools with 801 or more students) and AA-A (school with 800 or less students). This schools only compets between their classes on the post season.

This means that from 1995 - 2007 only one school could be state champion each year, and from 2008 to current days, 2 schools is state champion every year (one school from class AAA and one school from class AA-A)

== Format ==
The AAA West Virginia High School Women's Soccer State Tournament is a single-elimination tournament featuring 4 teams. The top team from each of the state's four regions qualify for the tournament. The tournament is typically held over the course of two days at a neutral location, with the semi-final and championship matches.

== State Tournament by year ==
2020

=== 2020 ===
State semi-finals
1	Parkersburg South	4
4	Jefferson	0
2	Wheeling Park	3
3	George Washington	2

State Championship Game
Parkersburg South	0
Wheeling Park	1

==== State semi-finals ====
November 6, 2020
17:00 GMT-4

Parkersburg South	4-0	Jefferson

YMCA Youth Sports Complex
November 6, 2020
19:00 GMT-4

Wheeling Park	3-2	George Washington

YMCA Youth Sports Complex

==== State Championship Game ====
November 7, 2020
13:30 GMT-4

Parkersburg South	0-1	Wheeling Park

YMCA Youth Sports Complex

Champion

Wheeling Park
(5th Title)
Top goalscorer
TBD
(goals)

=== Team of the year ===

Coach:

=== Awards ===
Player Of The Year
TBD
Forward Of The Year
TBD
Midfielder Of The Year
TBD
Defender Of The Year
TBD
Keeper Of The Year
TBD
Coach Of The Year
TBD

2021

=== 2021 ===
State semi-finals
1	George Washington	4
4	Spring Mills	0
2	Wheeling Park	5
3	Cabell Midland	0

State Championship Game
George Washington (a.e.t.)	2
Wheeling Park	1

==== State semi-finals ====
November 5, 2021
17:00 GMT-4

George Washington	4-0	Spring Mills

YMCA Youth Sports Complex
November 5, 2021
19:00 GMT-4

Wheeling Park	5-0	Cabell Midland

YMCA Youth Sports Complex

==== State Championship Game ====
November 6, 2021
13:30 GMT-4

George Washington	2-1 (a.e.t.)	Wheeling Park

YMCA Youth Sports Complex

Champion
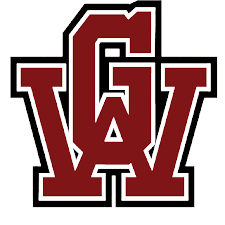
George Washington
(1st Title)
Top goalscorer
TBD
(goals)

=== Team of the year ===

Coach:

=== Awards ===
Player Of The Year
TBD
Forward Of The Year
TBD
Midfielder Of The Year
TBD
Defender Of The Year
TBD
Keeper Of The Year
TBD
Coach Of The Year
TBD

2022

=== 2022 ===
State semi-finals
1	Morgantown (a.e.t.)	1
4	Hedgesville	0
2	Parkersburg South	2
3	George Washington	1

State Championship Game
Morgantown (a.e.t.)	2
Parkersburg South	1

==== State semi-finals ====
November 4, 2022
17:00 GMT-4

Morgantown	1-0 (a.e.t.)	Hedgesville

YMCA Youth Sports Complex
November 4, 2022
19:00 GMT-4

Parkersburg South	2-1	George Washington

YMCA Youth Sports Complex

==== State Championship Game ====
November 5, 2022
13:30 GMT-4

Morgantown	2-1 (a.e.t.)	Parkersburg South

YMCA Youth Sports Complex

Champion
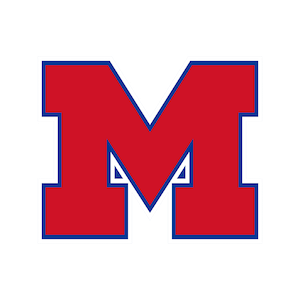
Morgantown
(3rd Title)
Top goalscorer
TBD
(goals)

=== Team of the year ===

Coach:

=== Awards ===
Player Of The Year
TBD
Forward Of The Year
TBD
Midfielder Of The Year
TBD
Defender Of The Year
TBD
Keeper Of The Year
TBD
Coach Of The Year
TBD

2023

=== 2023 ===
State semi-finals
1	Morgantown	2
4	Hedgesville	1
2	Parkersburg South	2
3	George Washington	0

State Championship Game
Morgantown	1
Parkersburg South	0

==== State semi-finals ====
November 2, 2023
17:00 GMT-4

Morgantown	2-1	Hedgesville
Gracie Brown 36'; Emily Carpenter 64'		Abby Johnson 5'

YMCA Youth Sports Complex
November 2, 2023
19:00 GMT-4

Parkersburg South	2-0	George Washington
Jozy Barton 47'; Regan Shockey 75'

YMCA Youth Sports Complex

==== State Championship Game ====
November 4, 2023
13:30 GMT-4

Morgantown	1-0	Parkersburg South
Vanja Mueller 97'

YMCA Youth Sports Complex

Champion
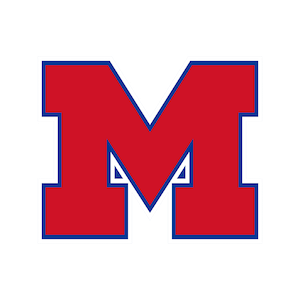
Morgantown
(4th Title)
Top goalscorer
TBD
(goals)

=== Team of the year ===

Coach:

=== Awards ===
Player Of The Year
TBD
Forward Of The Year
TBD
Midfielder Of The Year
TBD
Defender Of The Year
TBD
Keeper Of The Year
TBD
Coach Of The Year
TBD

2024

=== 2024 ===
Regional Finals
Morgantown	5
Bridgeport	1
George Washington	2
Greenbrier East	1
Parkersburg South	2
Huntington	0
Washington	3
Hedgesville	1

State semi-finals
Morgantown	0 (3)
George Washington	0(5)
Parkersburg South	0
Washington	3

State Championship Game
George Washington	1
Washington	2

==== Regionals Finals ====
October 29, 2024
17:00 GMT-4

Morgantown	5-1	Bridgeport
Ella Miller 4', 6', 9'; Shae Nethken 53'; Lily Gorman-Wilson 61'		Camdyn Smith 80'

John Marshall H.S.
October 29, 2024
17:00 GMT-4

George Washington	2-1	Greenbrier East
Ella Tice 4'; Shelby Tharp 45'		Caroline Dotson 5'

Woodrow Wilson H.S.
October 29, 2024
17:00 GMT-4

Parkersburg South	2-0	Huntington
Regan Shockey 39'; Marie Silvis 68'

Hurricane H.S.
October 29, 2024
17:00 GMT-4

Washington	3-1	Hedgesville
Megan Cantley 4', 39'; Ayla Kidd 67'		Rylee Bodkins 46'

Washington H.S.

==== State semi-finals ====
November 7, 2024
17:00 GMT-4

Morgantown	0-0	George Washington
Penalties
Ariana Borneo (penalty missed); Lilly Staples (penalty scored); Ella Miller (penalty scored); Gabbie Brown (penalty scored)	3–5	(penalty scored) Emma Cipoletti; (penalty scored) Ellie Pray; (penalty scored) Ella Chipps; (penalty scored) Isabella Smith; (penalty scored) Trinity Hodge

YMCA Youth Sports Complex
November 7, 2024
19:00 GMT-4

Parkersburg South	0-3	Washington
		Jurnee Vrobel 19', 50', 72'

YMCA Youth Sports Complex

==== State Championship Game ====
November 9, 2024
13:30 GMT-4

George Washington	1-2	Washington
Jurnee Vrobel 14'		Rozlyn McDonald 40'; Jurnee Vrobel 46'

YMCA Youth Sports Complex

Champion
Washington
(1st Title)
Top goalscorer
TBD
(goals)

=== Team of the year ===

Coach:

=== Awards ===
Player Of The Year
TBD
Forward Of The Year
TBD
Midfielder Of The Year
TBD
Defender Of The Year
TBD
Keeper Of The Year
TBD
Coach Of The Year
TBD

== List of champions ==
Below are the list of champions and runners-up of the AAA West Virginia High School Women's Soccer State Tournament:

=== Unifyed system (1995-2007) ===
Season	Winner	Runner-up	Result
1995	Winfield (1)	Buckannon Upshur	4-0
1996	Winfield (2)	Brooke	2-1
1997	Winfield (3)	Woodrow Wilson	3-1
1998	Wheeling Park (1)	Woodrow Wilson	2-0
1999	Wheeling Park (2)	George Washington	5-3
2000	Wheeling Park (3)	Sissonville	2-0
2001	Wheeling Park (4)	Morgantown	1-0
2002	Sissonville (1)	Parkersburg South	1-0
2003	Parkersburg South (1)	Huntington	2-1
2004	Huntington (1)	Elkins	1-0
2005	Elkins (1)	Parkersburg	3-0
2006	Parkersburg (1)	Fairmont Senior	1-0(a.e.t.)
2007	Jefferson (1)	Parkersburg	1-1 (13–12) (p)

=== AAA class system (2008-current) ===
Season	Winner	Runner-up	Result
2008	Nitro (1)	University	0-0 (2–1) (p)
2009	University (1)	Hurricane	1-0
2010	University (2)	George Washington	2-0
2011	Morgantown (1)	Winfield	0-0 (3–2) (p)
2012	Winfield (4)	George Washington	4-2(a.e.t.)
2013	Winfield (5)	Washington	2-0
2014	Winfield (6)	Washington	2-1
2015	Winfield (7)	Parkersburg	3-1
2016	University (3)	George Washington	1-0
2017	Cabell Midland (1)	University	1-0
2018	Hurricane (1)	Wheeling Park	1-1 (4–3)(p)
2019	Morgantown (2)	Hedgesville	3-2
2020	Wheeling Park (5)	Parkersburg South	1-0
2021	George Washington (1)	Wheeling Park	2-1 (a.e.t.)
2022	Morgantown (3)	Parkersburg South	2-1(a.e.t.)
2023	Morgantown (4)	Parkersburg South	1-0
2024	Washington (5)	George Washington	2-1
2025	Oak Hill (1)	George Washington	2-1

=== Titles by club ===
Club	Winners	Runners-up	Winning years
Winfield	7	1	1995, 1996, 1997, 2012, 2013, 2014, 2015
Wheeling Park	5	2	1998, 1999, 2000, 2001, 2020
Morgantown	4	1	2011, 2019, 2022, 2023
University	3	2	2002, 2010, 2016
Sissonville	1	1	2002
George Washington	1	5	2021
Parkersburg South	1	4	2003
Parkersburg	1	3	2006
Elkins	1	1	2005
Huntington	1	1	2004
Washington	1	0	2024
Cabell Midland	1	0	2017
Nitro	1	0	2008
Jefferson	1	0	2007
