= 2022 West Virginia High School Boys' Soccer (AAA) =

AAA West Virginia High School Soccer State Tournament
- Season: 2022
- Dates: 4–5 November 2022
- Champions: Greenbrier East (1st title)
- Top goalscorer: Tresz McLeod (35 goals)

The 2022 West Virginia High School Boys' Soccer State Tournament (AAA) was a statewide high school soccer competition held in West Virginia, United States. The tournament was organized by the West Virginia Secondary School Activities Commission (WVSSAC) and featured boys' teams from high schools across the state. The tournament took place from November 4–5, 2022, at the YMCA Paul Cline Memorial Youth Sports Complex in Beckley, West Virginia.

== State tournament – Beckley, WV ==
The state tournament was played in a single-elimination format, with the winner of each game advancing to the next round. The seeds were based on the ranking, therefore No. 1 Greenbrier East faced No. 4 Wheeling Park and the other semi-final was between No. 2 Hurricane vs No. 3 Spring Mills.

State semi-finals
1	Greenbrier East	2
4	Wheeling Park	1
2	Hurricane	0
3	Spring Mills	3

State Championship Game
1	Greenbrier East	2
3	Spring Mills	0

=== State semi-finals ===
4 November 2022
10:00 GMT-4

Greenbrier East	2–1	Wheeling Park
Chase Mizia 15' (pen.); Adam Seams 77'		Wilson Hanna 18'

YMCA Youth Sports Complex
4 November 2022
12:00 GMT-4

Hurricane	0–3	Spring Mills
		Isaiah Briggs 17', 75'; Joseph Reid 85'

YMCA Youth Sports Complex

=== State championship game ===
5 November 2022
10:30 GMT-4

Greenbrier East	2–0	Spring Mills
Adam Seams 55'; Luke Dolin 66'

YMCA Youth Sports Complex

Champion

Greenbrier East
(1st Title)

=== Team of the year ===

Coach: Mario Julian

=== Awards ===
Player Of The Year
Sam Clark (George Washington)
Forward Of The Year
Luke Dolin (Greenbrier East)
Midfielder Of The Year
Chase Mizia (Greenbrier East)
Defender Of The Year
Adam Seams (Greenbrier East)
Keeper Of The Year
Joe Cochran (Greenbrier East)
Coach Of The Year
Mario Julian (Wheeling Park)
