= 2016 West Virginia High School Boys' Soccer (AAA) =

AAA West Virginia High School Soccer State Tournament
- Season: 2016
- Dates: November 4–5, 2016
- Champions: George Washington (4th title)
- Top goalscorer: Teo Garces (41 goals)

The 2016 West Virginia High School Boys' Soccer State Tournament (AAA) was a statewide high school soccer competition held in West Virginia, United States. The tournament was organized by the West Virginia Secondary School Activities Commission (WVSSAC) and featured boys' teams from high schools across the state. The tournament took place from November 4–5, 2016, at the YMCA Paul Cline Memorial Youth Sports Complex in Beckley, West Virginia.

== State Tournament – Beckley, WV ==
The State Tournament was played in a single-elimination format, with the winner of each game advancing to the next round. The 4 regional champions battled for the state title, therefore University faced Parkersburg in the 1st semi-final and Jefferson played against George Washington on the other semi-final.

Regional Finals
University	2
Wheeling Park	0
Parkersburg	3
Hurricane	1
Jefferson	3
Hedgesville	0
George Washington	6
Woodrow Wilson	0

State semi-finals
University	3
Parkersburg	2
Jefferson	1
George Washington	5

State Championship Game
University	0
George Washington	4

=== State semi-finals ===
November 4, 2016
10:00 GMT-4

University	3-2	Parkersburg
Joseph Biafora 32', 51', 110'		Murad Hamirani 8'; Immanuel Opoku-Duah 52'

YMCA Youth Sports Complex
November 4, 2016
12:00 GMT-4

Jefferson	1-5	George Washington
Teo Garces 33'		Caleb Creed 3'; Chance Anderson 48'; Ahmed Muhammed 53'; Cole Snyder 72'; Noah Shaak 85'

YMCA Youth Sports Complex

=== State Championship Game ===
November 5, 2016
10:30 GMT-4

University	0-4	George Washington
		Josh Mabe 4'; Chance Anderson 37'; Matthew Brock 59' (o.g.); Noah Shaak 63'

YMCA Youth Sports Complex

Champion
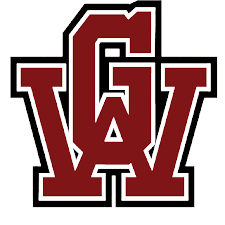
George Washington
(4th Title)
