= Scott Depot, West Virginia =

- Unincorporated community
- Location within the state of West Virginia Scott Depot, West Virginia (the United States)
- Coordinates: 38°26′50″N 81°54′42″W
- Country: United States
- State: West Virginia
- County: Putnam
- Time zone: UTC-5 (Eastern (EST))
  - Summer (DST): UTC-4 (EDT)
- ZIP codes: 25560
- GNIS feature ID: 1546516

Scott Depot is an unincorporated community in Putnam County, West Virginia, United States. Located along Crooked Creek, it is part of the census-designated place of Teays Valley, which is a part of the Huntington–Ashland metropolitan area. The ZIP code is 25560.

== Education ==
The Putnam County Schools operates public schools in the area. Students in Scott Depot are part of the Winfield attendance area, attending Winfield High School, Winfield Middle School, and Scott-Teays Elementary School.

The West Virginia International School (ウエストバージニア国際学校 Uesuto Bājinia Kokusai Gakkō), a Japanese weekend school, holds its classes at Scott Teays Elementary.
