= Pocahontas High School =

Pocahontas High School may refer to:

- Pocahontas High School (Arkansas)
- Pocahontas High School (Iowa), winner of the National High School Mock Trial Championship

== See also ==
- Pocahontas County High School, West Virginia
