= Jefferson County Public Schools (West Virginia) =

School district in West Virginia

Jefferson County Schools
- 110 Mordington Avenue Charles Town, West Virginia, 25414

District information
- Superintendent: Dr. Chuck Bishop
- Schools: 16
- NCES District ID: 5400570

Students and staff
- Students: 8,682 (2021-22)
- Teachers: 583.5 (on an FTE basis)

Other information
- Website: https://www.jcswv.org

Jefferson County Schools is the operating school district within Jefferson County, West Virginia. It is governed by the Jefferson County Board of Education. Dr. Chuck Bishop serves as the superintendent.

== Schools ==
=== High schools ===
- Jefferson High School
- Washington High School

=== Middle schools ===
- Charles Town Middle School
- Harpers Ferry Middle School
- Shepherdstown Middle School
- Wildwood Middle School

=== Elementary schools ===
- Blue Ridge Primary School
- Blue Ridge Elementary School
- C.W. Shipley Elementary School
- Driswood Elementary School
- North Jefferson Elementary School
- Page-Jackson Elementary School
- Ranson Elementary School
- Shepherdstown Elementary School
- South Jefferson Elementary School
- T.A. Lowery Elementary School
- Wright Denny Intermediate School (3-5)

== Schools no longer in operation ==
- Bakerton School
- Charles Town High School
- Charles Town Junior High School
- Eagle Avenue School
- Edgewood School
- Harpers Ferry High School
- Harpers Ferry Junior High School
- Jefferson High Ninth Grade Complex
- Kabletown Elementary
- Kearneysville Elementary
- Middleway Elementary
- Millville Elementary
- Page-Jackson High School
- Ranson Kindergarten Center
- Rippon Elementary
- Shenandoah Junction Elementary
- Shepherdstown High School
- Shepherdstown Junior High School
- Summit Point Elementary
