= Schoenbaum Stadium =

Soccer stadium in Charleston, West Virginia

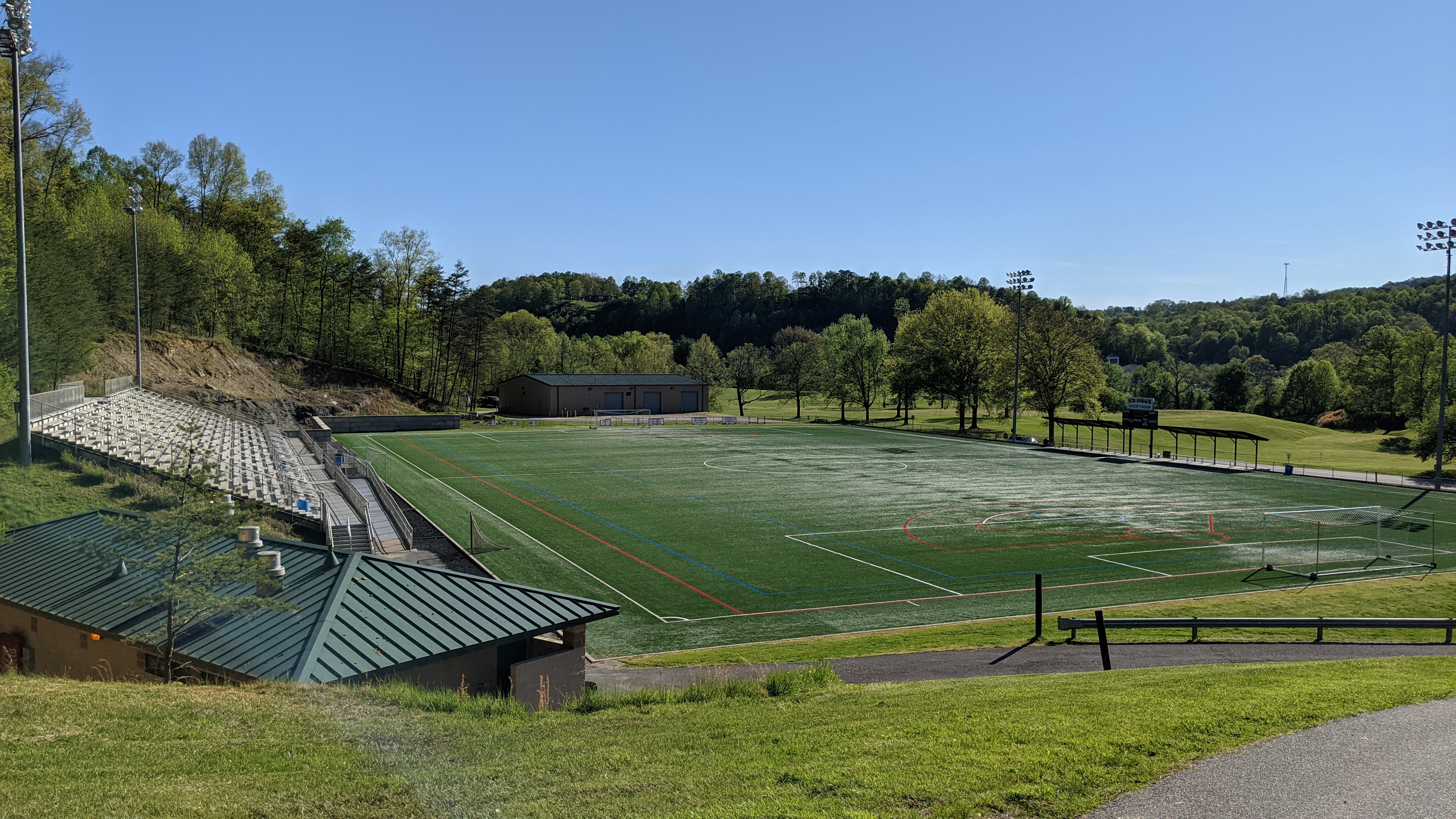
- Interactive map of Schoenbaum Stadium
- Location: Charleston, West Virginia
- Coordinates: 38.39465°N 81.58187°W
- Owner: Schoenbaum Family Foundation
- Capacity: 6,000
- Surface: Field Turf

Construction
- Opened: 2000

Tenant
- West Virginia United

Schoenbaum Stadium is a soccer stadium in Charleston, West Virginia located in Coonskin Park. The 6,000-seat stadium is home to West Virginia United of USL League Two.

== See also ==
- Alex Schoenbaum
