= Lewis County High School (Weston, West Virginia) =

Location
- 205 Minuteman Drive; Weston, West Virginia 26452; United States; 39.0199°N 80.4786°W

Information
- Type: Public
- Established: 1966
- Principal: John Whiston
- Teaching staff: 47.00 (FTE)
- Gender: Co-ed
- Enrollment: 703 (2024-2025)
- Student to teacher ratio: 14.96
- Colors: Blue & grey
- Nickname: Minutemen
- Website: www.lewisboe.com/o/lchs

Lewis County High School was created in 1966 with the consolidation of Weston High School, Jane Lew High School and Walkersville High School in Lewis County, West Virginia, United States. The original Lewis County High School was located on Court Street in Weston, West Virginia. The Weston Colored School's one high school student was absorbed into Weston High in 1954 after the historic Brown v. Board of Education Supreme Court decision. Lewis County High moved to its present location, just south of Weston, in 1994. The original Lewis County High now serves as Robert L. Bland Middle School.

Lewis County High School is a grade 9-12 school with an enrollment of 677 students. LCHS serves Lewis County, West Virginia which has a rural population of about 16,500.

== Colors and Mascot ==
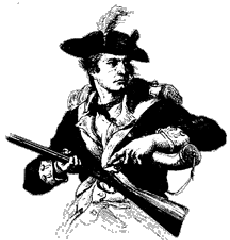
The Minuteman is the mascot of Lewis County High School. The school colors are blue and grey.

Lewis County High School adopted its colors, blue and grey, and its nickname, the Minutemen, from Weston High School, the largest of the three schools that consolidated. Weston High School adopted the colors in the 1910s and the nickname in the 1920s. Jane Lew's school colors were red and black and the nickname was the Redskins. Walkersville's school colors were blue and white, and the nickname was the Broncos.

== Media ==
Lewis County High School students operate an online newspaper named The Blue and Grey. Students also operate a television station, WLC. The high school yearbook is the Collicola.

== JROTC ==
LCHS maintains an Air Force Junior Reserve Officers' Training Corps program which is available to students at all grade levels.

== Athletics ==
LCHS is a member of the West Virginia Secondary School Activities Commission (WVSSAC) and competes at the Class AA level. The athletic department is in the 13 school Big Ten Conference.

== Music ==
The music department at Lewis County is well known for their bands and choirs, which serve over 150 students. Performance-based ensembles at the school include marching, pep, concert, and jazz bands; a percussion ensemble; a concert choir; a vocal ensemble; and a bluegrass band.

The band program at LCHS is directed by Allen Heath, a Lewis County graduate. The marching band boast over 100 members for its 2023–2024 season. During the fall, the marching band serves the community and football teams. In the winter, a pep band performs at basketball games. There is also a concert band in the winter, which continues through the spring. The jazz band and percussion ensembles rehearse and perform throughout the year. The bluegrass band, also known by LC Blue, is directed by Mark Lynch, a retired science teacher.

The choirs at Lewis County High perform community events, competitions, and school events regularly. The Minutemen Melodics, the top choir at LCHS, has previously worked with people such as Eric Whitacre and attends multiple choral festivals across the state. The choirs at Lewis County High School were directed by Martina Kiser from 2015 to 2018. In the fall of 2018, the position was taken by Seth Stemple. In 2020, Martina Kiser returned to direct the LCHS choir.
