= Charleston Catholic High School =

Private school in Charleston, West Virginia, United States

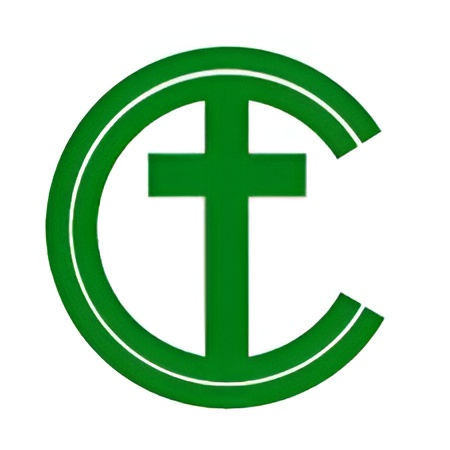

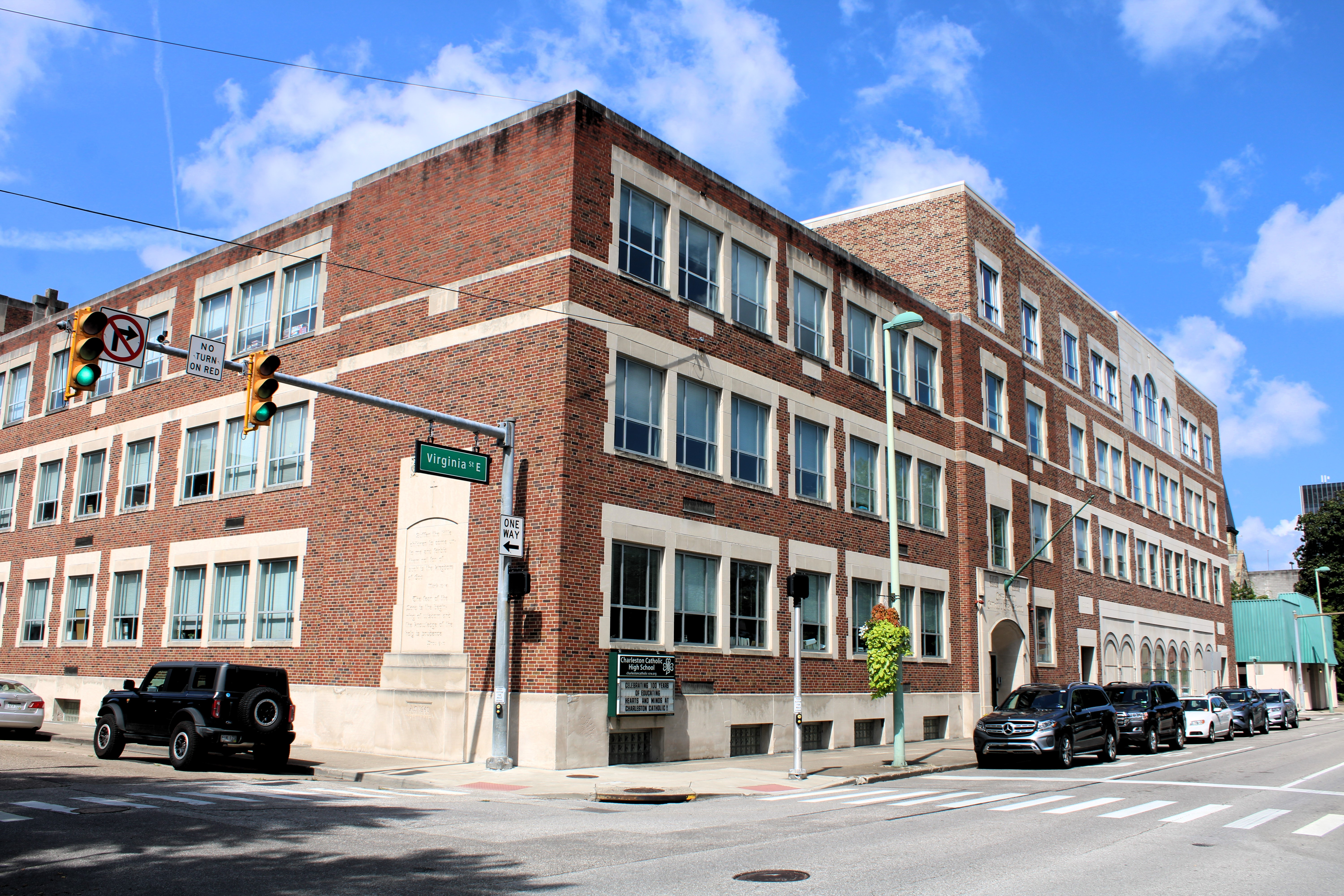

Location
- 1033 Virginia Street East; Charleston, (Kanawha County), West Virginia 25301-2831; United States; 38°20′49″N 81°38′1″W

Information
- Type: Private
- Motto: Quaerens Scientiam in Christo Luce (Seeking Knowledge in the Light of Christ)
- Religious affiliations: Roman Catholic; Diocese of Wheeling-Charleston
- Established: 1923
- Principal: Colleen M. Hoyer
- Grades: 6–12
- Enrollment: 422 (2012)
- Colors: Kelly green and white
- Slogan: Go Irish!
- Sports: Yes
- Team name: Irish and Lady Irish
- Accreditation: North Central Association of Colleges and Schools
- Website: School: http://www.charlestoncatholic-crw.org Athletics: https://www.ccirishathletics.com

Charleston Catholic High School is a Catholic high school located in eastern downtown Charleston, West Virginia, US. CCHS was founded in 1923 and is part of the Roman Catholic Diocese of Wheeling-Charleston.

== History ==
As early as 1869, Sacred Heart Church (founded in 1815) had established a parochial school and conducted primary grades irregularly throughout the late 1800s. In 1903, the Sisters of St. Francis of Penance and Christian Charity, of Stella Niagara, New York, assumed administration of the school. In 1923, Sacred Heart added high school grades in the former Chilton house in downtown Charleston and named the institution Sacred Heart High School. In 1940, John J. Swint, the bishop of the then Diocese of Wheeling, created Charleston Catholic High School. Area Catholics contributed to the construction of a three-story building, including science laboratories and a gymnasium, completed in 1941. Post-war growth of Charleston led to the expansion of the school and the addition of a third floor in the 1950s. Enrollment peaked in the late 1960s and then began a slow decline in the mid-1980s.

In 1986, Father P. Edward Sadie, a local priest, hired Debra K. Sullivan as the principal. Enrollment rebounded through the 1990s. In 1994 a new math and science wing opened. In 2000, Charleston Catholic purchased and renovated the Players Club tennis building, adding basketball, volleyball, and training facilities. At the end of the 2013-14 school year and after 28 years as principal, Debra Sullivan announced her retirement, to be replaced by Colleen McCartney Hoyer of the CCHS graduating class of 1994, who previously served as Assistant Principal for Student Affairs.

== Enrollment ==
Charleston Catholic enrolls both Christian and non-Christian students from a wide range of ethnic, racial, and socio-economic backgrounds. Students are required to follow a uniform policy. CCHS boasts a rigorous college preparatory program for all students with an extensive offering of academic, athletic, and extracurricular programs. Its athletic teams compete with public and parochial schools in the WVSSAC Division A. Typically, 100 percent of graduating classes enroll in four-year colleges and universities.

== Awards and recognition ==
Charleston Catholic High School was named as having the top athletics program in West Virginia for 2008-2009 school year by Sports Illustrated.

In 2013, 65% of students in grades 9 through 12 took at least one AP exam, many taking more than one, with a total of 260 exams taken by CCHS students. Over 61.5% of the Class of 2013 took and passed an AP exam during their high school careers. The same year, 13% of the Senior Class of 2014 were named National Merit Semi-Finalists.

Members of the Charleston Catholic High School Class of 2009 were accepted and enrolled in some of the country's finest universities (including Princeton University, Harvard University, and the Wharton School of the University of Pennsylvania), had eight national merit finalists in a graduating class of only 69, and were ACRE champions. 38% of the graduating class were honored as AP scholars.
