= East Fairmont High School =

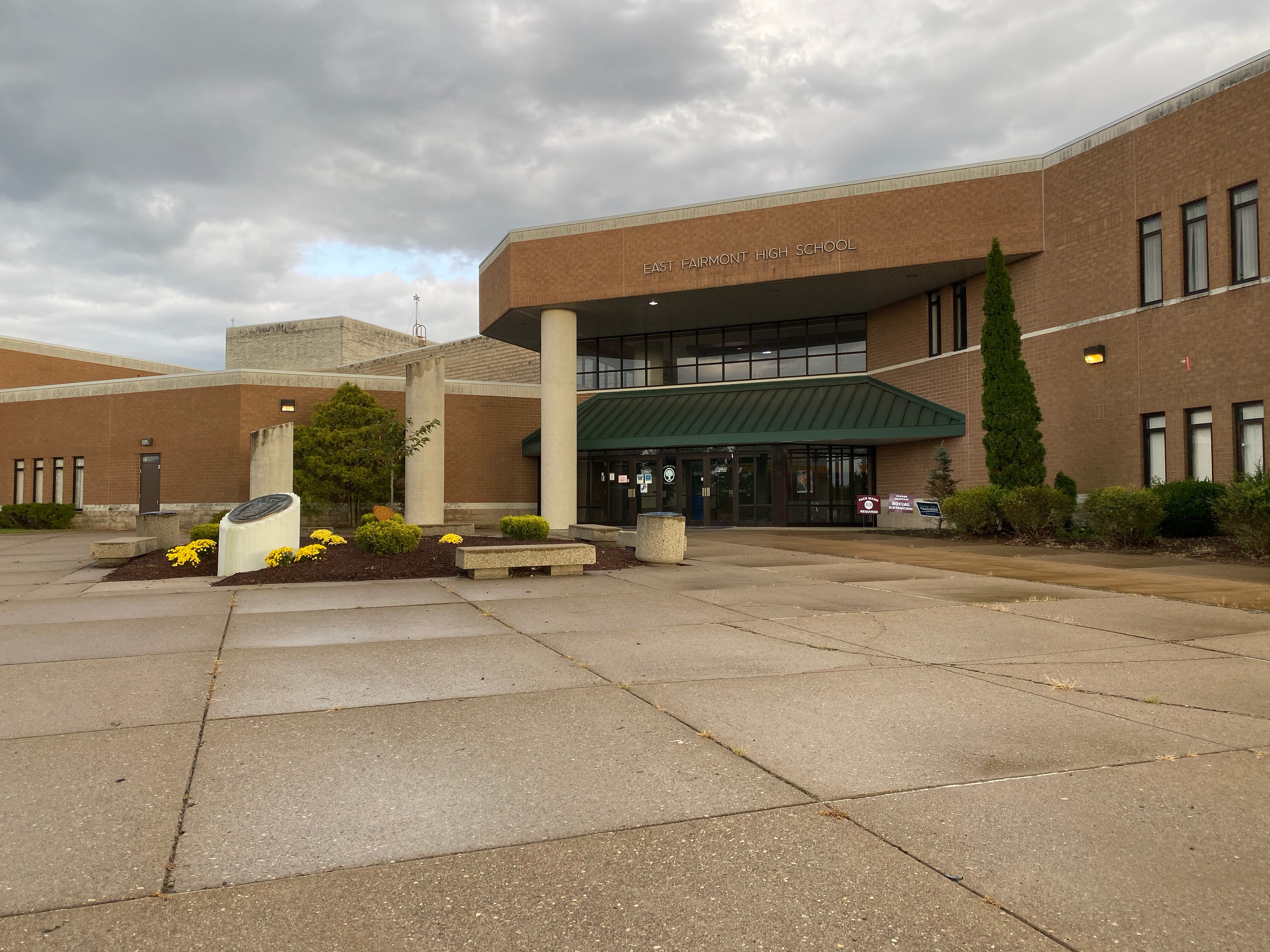
- The front of East Fairmont High School in 2020

Location
- 1993 Airport Road; Fairmont, West Virginia 26554; United States; 39°27′3″N 80°9′22″W

Information
- Type: Public, coeducational
- Established: 1917; 109 years ago
- School district: Marion County Schools
- Principal: Mary Lynn Westfall
- Teaching staff: 46.00 (FTE)
- Grades: 9–12
- Enrollment: 700 (2023–2024)
- Student to teacher ratio: 15.22
- Colors: Blue and gold
- Nickname: The Hive
- Team name: Bees
- Rival: Fairmont Senior High School
- Website: www.marionboe.com/o/east-fairmont-hs

East Fairmont High School is a public high school in Pleasant Valley, United States, just east of Fairmont. The school has been known also as East Side High.

The school is classified as "AA". Its school colors are blue and gold, and the athletic teams are known as the Bees. It is one of three high schools still active in Marion County, along with Fairmont Senior High School and North Marion High School. It is fed by East Fairmont Middle School.

== History ==
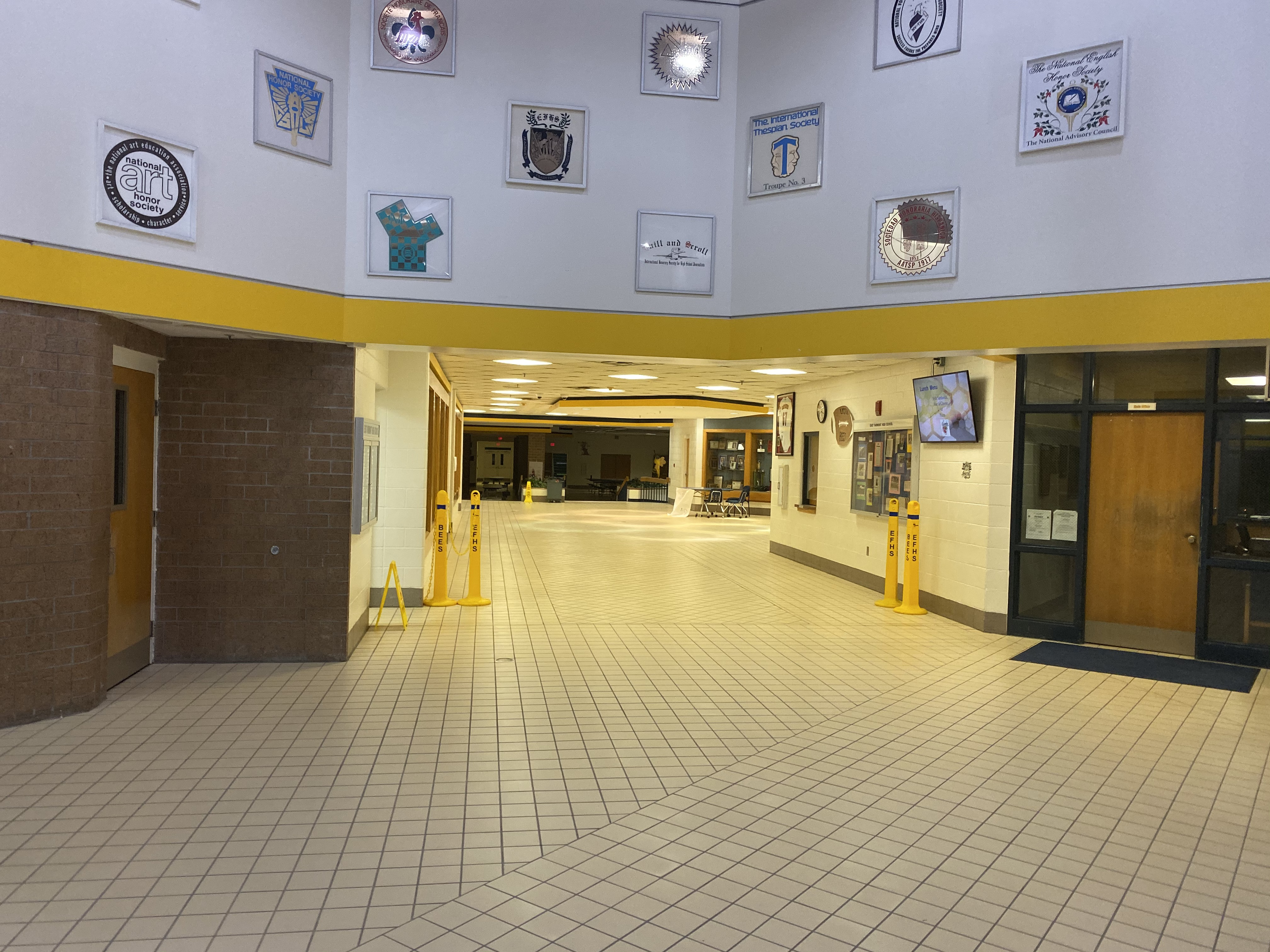
Entrance of the current EFHS building, which was constructed in 1993

The school was established in 1917 to fix overcrowding problems of Fairmont's other school at the time, Fairmont High School (now more commonly known as Fairmont Senior High School). Originally, the school was held in the rooms of Central School, but the school's location was moved twice in 1921 and 1993 respectively.

== Fine arts ==
East Fairmont High School offers different fine arts programs to its students, such as a school marching band and a choir program.

=== Marching band ===
The school has a marching band, the East Fairmont High School Busy Bee Band and Honeybees, which was founded and originally directed by Earl W. McConnell, Sr. As of 2010, TJ Bean is the current director of the band.

The band has represented the school, Fairmont, and West Virginia in different notable events. The band performed at the Rose Parade and the inaugurations of Presidents George H. W. Bush and George W. Bush. On January 1, 2000, the band was the first north-central WV school to participate in the Tournament of Roses Parade. In 2009, the band played at the inaugural parade for then-WV Governor Joe Manchin. Fairmont Senior High School has held an annual Band Spectacular, which the East Fairmont band has frequently performed at.

The East Fairmont band also hosts an annual Follies show in East Fairmont High School's auditorium.

=== Choir program ===
East Fairmont also has a choir program. The choir program includes the East Fairmont High School Elizabethan Chamber Singers & My Fair Ladies, which has held an annual winter concert. The school's choir also has performed in Hawaii for a Pearl Harbor honor concert in 2018.

== Athletics ==
East Fairmont offers many different sports to its students, including baseball, basketball, track and field, football, soccer, wrestling, softball, and volleyball.

=== East-West rivalry ===
“For many Fairmonters, the East-West game is the World Series, the Rose Bowl and the Kentucky Derby jammed into one great athletic spectacle.” — John Veasey of Times West Virginian, 1968

East Fairmont has a rivalry in sports with Fairmont Senior High School, which started on October 25, 1921, when the two schools first played football together. The schools share the historic East–West Stadium for football games. The East-West football games have since been a significant part of this rivalry.

=== State championship history ===
- 1990 AAA State Baseball Champions
- 1993 AAA State Cheer Champions
- 1995 AAA State Cheer Champions
- 2003 AAA State Softball Champions
- 2004 AAA State Softball Champions
- 2016 AA/A State Boys' Soccer Champions

2017 AA State Boys Cross Country Champions http://www.runwv.com/CC17/CCIndex.html

2024 AA Girls Soccer State Champions

== Reputation ==
Easy Fairmont is generally an above average school in school rankings. In 2020, U.S. News & World Report ranked East Fairmont High School as 3,488th in national ranking, 16th in state ranking, and 2nd in county ranking. As of 2020, the school is in the top 10 percent of West Virginia public schools for "highest reading/language arts proficiency" and "highest graduation rate", but it is in the bottom 50 percent for "math proficiency".

== Notable people ==
=== Staff ===
- Russ Meredith, NFL player and member of the West Virginia House of Delegates

=== Alumni ===
- David Carpenter, MLB player
