= PikeView High School =

Coordinates: 37.428632°N 81.059948°W

- 3566 Eads Mill Road; Gardner, Mercer County, West Virginia; 24739; United States

Information
- Opened: 1994
- School district: Mercer County Schools
- Principal: Anna Lilly
- Teaching staff: 33.00 (FTE)
- Grades: 9–12
- Enrollment: 610 (2023-2024)
- Student to teacher ratio: 18.48
- Colors: Red and black
- Team name: Panthers
- Website: https://www.boe.merc.k12.wv.us/o/phs

PikeView High School is a public high school serving grades 9–12, located in Mercer County, West Virginia, United States. PikeView High School is administered by Mercer County Schools.

PikeView High School has an enrollment of 750 students and 60 staff members. The current principal is Anna Lilly.

== Background ==
PikeView High School was established in 1994 after the consolidation of Athens, Matoaka, Oakvale, and Spanishburg High Schools. It is located 8 miles outside of Princeton, on Eads Mill Road. The school is within view of the West Virginia Turnpike, hence the name.

== Academics ==
PikeView High School is improving scores as they have increased over 70% in just the past two years. In 2013 PikeView was named a success school on the WesTest. 11 out of 12 students passed the AP US History test in the 2012–2013 school year.

== Nickname and colors ==
PikeView's colors are red, black, and white. The nickname is the panther. PikeView's mascot's name is AMOS, an acronym composed of the first letter of the four schools which feed into PikeView: Athens, Matoaka, Oakvale, and Spanishburg.

== Sports ==
PikeView High School is classified as AA. It currently offers cross country, track, basketball, baseball, softball, volleyball, football, soccer, marching band, golf, swim, cheerleading and wrestling.

The football organization has had playoff appearances in 94, 96, 09, and 10. PikeView has had multiple cross country and track participants in the state run. The boys' basketball team was in the Elite Eight in 2011, making it to Charleston. PikeView's girls' basketball team made it to the state tournament three years in a row (2011, 2012, and 2013). In 2012 they appeared in the Final Four. The baseball program is growing with success; they were the 2013, 2014, 2015 sectional champions. 2015 was a breakout year with a regional championship leading to the baseball team's first trip, the state tournament. The girls' soccer team has made it to the Final Four multiple times throughout the years, along with the boys' soccer team. The marching band has appeared in multiple competitions and won numerous first place awards. The band also added a new choice, the Dance Team. The boys' soccer team won the state title in 2013. The volleyball team has appeared at the state tournament in 2014 and 2015, and achieved first place in the Coalfield Conference in the 2015–2016 school year.
