= Putnam County Schools =

School district in West Virginia, US

- 77 Courthouse Drive Winfield, West Virginia, 25213

District information
- Superintendent: John G. Hudson
- Schools: 23
- NCES District ID: 5401200

Students and staff
- Students: 9,136 (2021-22)
- Teachers: 658 (on an FTE basis)

Other information
- Website: https://www.putnamschools.com

Putnam County Schools is the operating school district serving Putnam County, West Virginia. It is governed by the Putnam County Board of Education. John Hudson serves as the district superintendent.

== Schools ==
Schools divided by area:

Buffalo Area:

- Buffalo High School
- George Washington Middle School
- George Washington Elementary School
- Buffalo Elementary School
- Confidence Elementary School

Hurricane Area:

- Hurricane High School
- Hurricane Middle School
- Conner Street Elementary School
- Hurricane Town Elementary School
- Lakeside Elementary School
- Mountain View Elementary School
- West Teays Elementary School

Poca Area:

- Poca High School
- Poca Middle School
- Poca Elementary School
- Hometown Elementary School
- Rock Branch Elementary School

Winfield Area:

- Winfield High School
- Winfield Middle School
- Winfield Elementary School
- Eastbrook Elementary School
- Scott-Teays Elementary School
