= Braxton County High School =

Location
- 200 Jerry Burton Drive; Sutton, West Virginia 26601; United States
- Coordinates: 38.69585°N 80.66717°W

Information
- Type: Public
- School district: Braxton County School District
- Superintendent: Rhonda Combs
- Principal: Lori Stover
- Staff: 36.50 (FTE)
- Grades: 9–12
- Student to teacher ratio: 13.89
- Colors: Dark green and Vegas gold
- Athletics conference: AA
- Website: Official website

Braxton County High School (BCHS) is a high school located in Sutton, West Virginia, United States. The school includes grades 9–12, and serves all of Braxton County.

== School history ==
BCHS replaced three smaller high schools in the county, Sutton High School, Gassaway High School, and Burnsville High School, thereby consolidating both Braxton County's students and its educational resources. The two-story school building initially consisted of three wings, known as A, B, and C. C wing was the academic wing which contained classrooms for classes such as chemistry, math, and English. B wing was the vocational wing which held vocational classes, such as typing, cooking, building construction, electrical and welding. A wing consisted of administrative offices, a cafeteria and a gymnasium, including a training area behind the second level.

All of the wings were connected by a ground floor central area that included the main offices, cafeteria, library, and band room. In the summer of 1991, a wooden covered bridge was built that connected the second floors of B and C wings to help students transition from classes more quickly. In the 1990s, the open area where the bridge had previously been built was enclosed to create more classrooms, and to fully connect B and C wings.

In the summer of 2006, the entire front area of the school was expanded to accommodate Fairmont State University, filling in the previously open walkway to the school entrance and closing the gap between the B wing, and the gymnasium. A ribbon-cutting ceremony for these changes was held on August 15, 2006. Students of junior level and adults were able to enroll in college classes at Braxton County High School, through Fairmont State University and Glenville State College.

== School grounds ==
The school sits on top of a hill. Its grounds include a large parking lot and open hillside on three sides. Jerry Burton Drive, named after a much-loved coach who died from leukemia in the 1980s, runs along the edge of the hill, circling the school. In 2006, a second parking lot was created in the lot below the high school.

There is a football field with various athletic buildings nearby. In 1991, a new Braxton County Middle School was built on the other side of the parking lot, placing both these schools within walking distance of each other. This new middle school, located on Carter Braxton Drive, also replaced three middle schools: Burnsville, Gassaway and Sutton. As a result, the county contained one consolidated high school and consolidated middle school.

== Statistics ==
As of the 2016–2017 school year, there were 571 students attending BCHS. The students are 99% Caucasian. The student-teacher ratio is 14.28:1.

== Sports ==
The school's mascot is the Eagle and the school colors are green and gold.

Braxton County is ranked an AA team in sports, and participates in soccer (both women and men), golf, football, Basketball, women's basketball, baseball, women's softball, track, wrestling, and women's volleyball. The baseball team was WV AA state champions for the 2010 season. In 2013, the cross country team was ranked 3rd in the state at the "AA" level.

== See also ==
- List of high schools in West Virginia
- Education in West Virginia
