= Nitro High School =

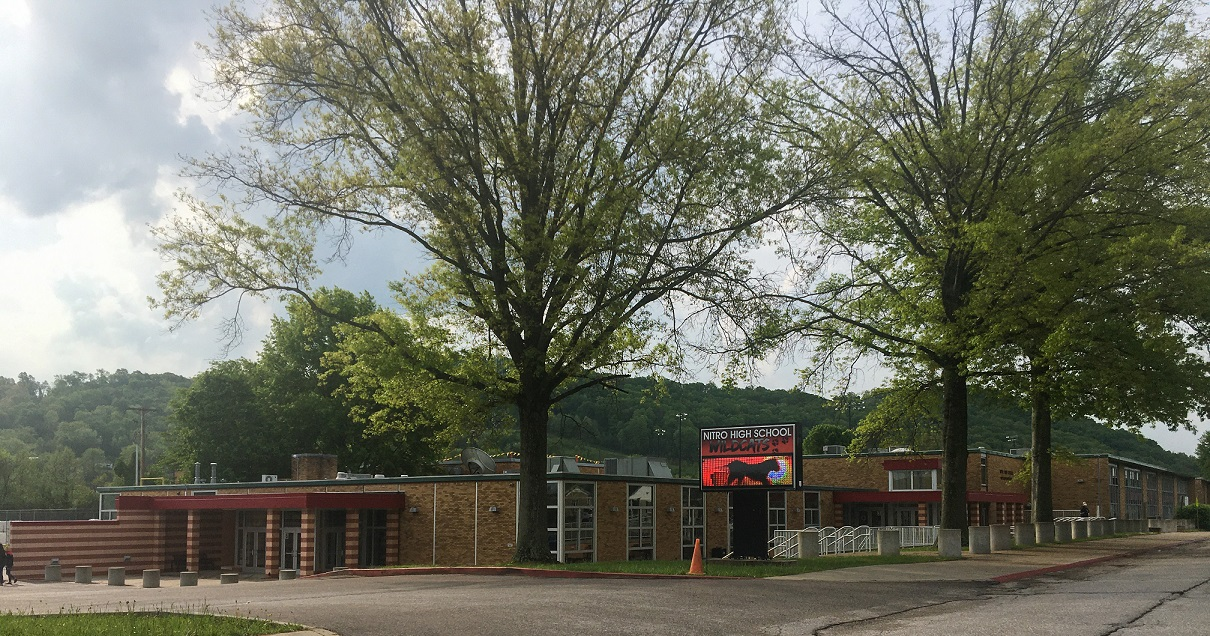

Location
- 1300 Park Avenue; Nitro, West Virginia 25143; 38°25′9″N 81°50′45″W

Information
- Type: Free public
- Motto: Love. Learning. Leadership.
- Established: 1917
- School district: Kanawha County Schools
- Principal: Brian Barth
- Teaching staff: 41.00 (FTE)
- Grades: 9–12
- Student to teacher ratio: 19.46
- Campus type: Suburban
- Colors: Red and Black
- Athletics conference: Cardinal Conference
- Nickname: Wildcats
- Rivals: Saint Albans High School and Poca High School
- Website: https://nh.kana.k12.wv.us/

Nitro High School is a public high school in the city of Nitro in Kanawha County, West Virginia. It is one of eight public high schools in the Kanawha County School District.

== History ==
The current building was built in 1959 as Nitro Junior High School and expanded in 1966. Nitro Junior High School closed in 1992 and Nitro High School was relocated to the NJHS's former building and remains there today (after substantial renovation over the years). The former NHS building, located in the heart of the city's business district on 21st Street, then became the Nitro Community Center and later was used by a local church. The church vacated the building in approximately 2020. After several years of abandonment and deterioration, the City of Nitro purchased the former NHS building in July 2025 with the intention of demolishing it and repurposing the property.

== Performing arts ==
Nitro has three competitive show choirs, the men's-only Tomcats, the women's-only Sophisticats and the mixed-gender Showcats, which are directed by Amy Smith and Assistant director Dylan Carpenter.

== Notable alumni ==
- J.R. House, Major League Baseball catcher and coach
- Kathy Mattea, Grammy award-winning country music artist
- Lew Burdette, Major League Baseball pitcher
