= Pocahontas County High School =

Coordinates: 38.287687°N 79.932498°W

- 271 Warrior Way; Dunmore, West Virginia 24934

Information
- Type: Public
- Established: 1968
- School district: Pocahontas County Schools
- Principal: Joseph Riley
- Teaching staff: 28.00 (FTE)
- Grades: 9-12
- Enrollment: 291 (2023–2024)
- Student to teacher ratio: 10.39
- Colors: Maroon and gold
- Mascot: Warrior
- Information: (304) 799-6565
- Website: pchs.pocahontas.k12.wv.us

Pocahontas County High School is a public high school located in Dunmore, West Virginia, United States. It serves 278 students in grades 9-12. Pocahontas County High School opened in 1968; it replaced Green Bank High School, Hillsboro High School, and Marlinton High School.

== History ==
Newspaper editor and state legislator Jane Price Sharp attended Marlinton High School.

== Athletics ==
Pocahontas County High School participates in athletics under the nickname Warriors. It competes in class A of the West Virginia Secondary School Activities Commission.
