= Jefferson High School (Shenandoah Junction, West Virginia) =

Coordinates: 39°21′12″N 77°49′59″W

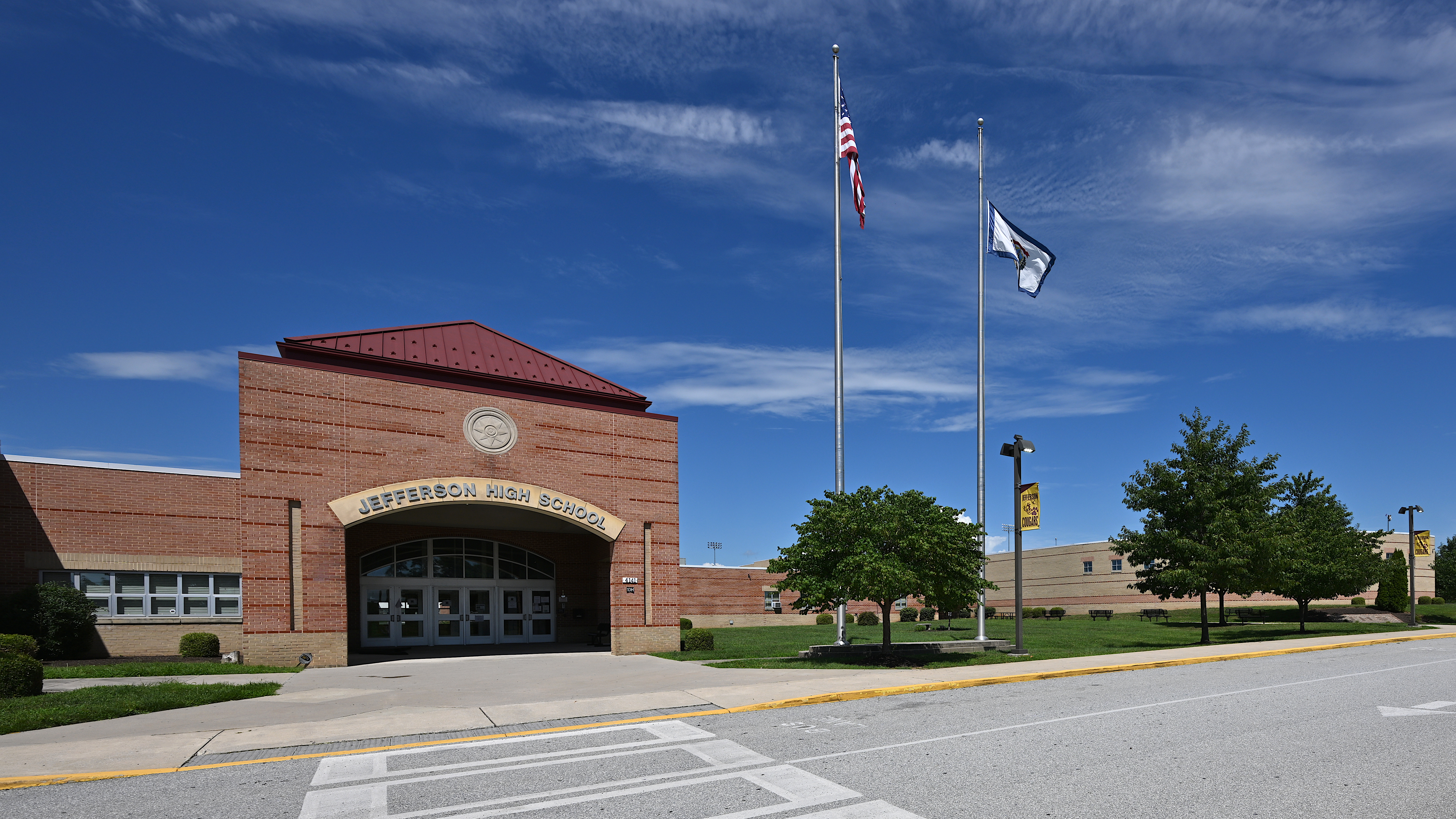
- Jefferson High School, 2022

Location
- 4141 Flowing Springs Road; Shenandoah Junction, West Virginia 25442; USA

Information
- Type: Public
- Motto: “J-High or die”
- Established: 1972
- Founder: Sara Lee Taylor Lueck
- Oversight: Jefferson Public Schools
- Headmaster: Mary Beth Group
- Teaching staff: 92.50 (FTE)
- Grades: 9–12
- Enrollment: 1,394 (2023-2024)
- Student to teacher ratio: 15.07
- Colors: Maroon and gold
- Mascot: Cougars
- Nickname: "JHigh"
- Rival: Washington High School
- Newspaper: Spirit of Jefferson Farmer's Advocate
- Yearbook: Jefferson High School Reflections

Jefferson High School is a high school located in the lower Shenandoah Valley in Shenandoah Junction, West Virginia. It was established in the fall of 1972, when the county combined Charles Town, Harpers Ferry, and Shepherdstown High Schools. It remained the only high school in Jefferson County until the fall of 2008. In-county rival, Washington High School, opened for the 2008–09 school year, splitting the Jefferson student body. Jefferson's total enrollment is 1,400.

Jefferson's baseball program is the most decorated in West Virginia. The Cougars have won 12 state championships, most recently winning back-to-back titles in 2015–16. John Lowery has headed the program since the school's opening. He owns more than 1,330 wins and has led the Cougars to 47 straight 20+ win seasons.

Jefferson's softball team won its first state title in 2022. The Cougars' boys track team has won six state championships, including four straight from 2010–2013. Girls track (2009, 2021, 2024), boys tennis (1992), cross country (2011) and girls soccer (2007) have also won state championships. The "Cougar" mascot, also known as J. Crew, has been the mascot since the school's founding.

The Jefferson "Cougar" Marching Band, previously under the direction Mr. J.P. Lynch Jr. now under the direction of Mr. Tanner Petri, is recognized as one of the top bands in West Virginia. The band has over 175 student musicians, and in 2012 the band was awarded first place in the Tournament of Bands (TOB) championships. A notable achievement includes the honor of marching in the Cherry Blossom Festival in Washington D.C. in April 2013, 2015, and 2022.

The Jefferson High School Symphonic Band was also named The West Virginia Honor Band in 2011, 2013, 2015, 2017, 2019, and 2022.

== Notable alumni ==
- John Hardy, member of the West Virginia House of Delegates
- James Jett, Olympic sprinter
- Dewey McDonald, NFL linebacker

== See also ==
- Jefferson County Schools
- List of high schools in West Virginia
- Education in West Virginia
