= Spring Mills High School =

School in Berkeley County, West Virginia, US

Coordinates: 39°32′18.1″N 77°53′56.2″W

Location
- 499 Campus Drive; Martinsburg, (Berkeley County), West Virginia 25404; United States

Information
- Type: Public high school
- Established: 2013
- Principal: Mark Salfia
- Staff: 92.33 (FTE)
- Grades: 9-12
- Enrollment: 1,544 (2024-2025)
- Student to teacher ratio: 16.72
- Colors: Red, white, and navy
- Mascot: Northern Cardinal
- Website: Spring Mills High School

Spring Mills High School is a high school in Spring Mills, West Virginia. The school welcomed its inaugural class in the Fall of 2013.

== History ==
The school was officially dedicated by officials including West Virginia governor Earl Ray Tomblin on August 7, 2013. Spring Mills was the largest high school built in West Virginia with state funds. On opening, the student body was formed from about one-half of the student body of each of Martinsburg High School and Hedgesville High School, which had become overcrowded.

On July 1, 2019, Jason Kamlowsky, was put in charge of the school's principal, replacing Robert Myers, who was principal for two years. Kamlowsky was replaced with Mark Salifa on July 1, 2022.

== Campus ==
The school is 250,000 square feet (23,000 m^{2}), and features a 750-seat auditorium.

== Mascot ==
The school's mascot is a Northern Cardinal, nicknamed "Big Red". The colors of the school are red, white, and navy blue.

== Orchestra program ==
Spring Mills High is unique in Berkeley County by having an orchestra program. It is home to the Spring Mills High School String Orchestra. Each year, members of the orchestra travel to West Virginia University in Morgantown to participate in the WVU Honors Orchestra.
