= Greenbrier East High School =

School in West Virginia, United States

Location
- 273 Spartan Lane; Lewisburg, West Virginia 24901; United States
- Coordinates: 37°46′33″N 80°28′13″W

Information
- Type: Public
- Established: 1968
- School district: Greenbrier County Schools
- Principal: David Vincent
- Faculty: 70.00 (FTE)
- Grades: 9 to 12
- Enrollment: 1,013 (2023-2024)
- Student to teacher ratio: 14.47
- Colors: Green and gold
- Athletics conference: MSAC
- Mascot: Spartans
- Website: gehs.greenbriercountyschools.org

Greenbrier East High School, a part of Greenbrier County Schools, is consolidated school in Fairlea, West Virginia, that serves grades 9 through 12. It is located on Spartan Lane, just off US 219 near Lewisburg, West Virginia. Although not within easy walking distance of Lewisburg, the school has a Lewisburg mailing address. It had 1,048 students enrolled (as of 2021-2022), and over 65 faculty members.

The Spartans won the 2012 girls' basketball state championship under head coach and now-Senator Jim Justice, a billionaire businessman who has coached the team since 2003 (and the boys' team from 2011 through 2017). Justice has continued his coaching duties while serving as Governor of West Virginia and as a U.S. Senator for West Virginia. The team also won the 2026 West Virginia girl's basketball state championship under Justice.

== See also ==
- List of high schools in West Virginia
- Education in West Virginia
