= Hurricane High School (West Virginia) =

Location
- 3350 Teays Valley Road; Hurricane, West Virginia 25526; United States; 38.43770°N 82.00563°W

Information
- Type: Public high school
- School district: Putnam County Schools
- Principal: Joshua Caldwell
- Teaching staff: 79.00 (FTE)
- Grades: 9–12
- Enrollment: 1,228 (2023–2024)
- Student to teacher ratio: 15.54
- Colors: Red and white
- Nickname: Redskins
- Website: hhs.putnamschools.com

Hurricane High School is a public high school located in Hurricane, West Virginia, United States. It serves students in grades 9 through 12 and is one of four high schools operated by Putnam County Schools.

== Academics ==
HHS has above-average standardized test scores in math and reading. In 2016, Newsweek included Hurricane on its list of best high schools for low-income students.

== Extracurricular activities ==
=== Athletics ===
Hurricane High School's sports teams are classified as AAA by the West Virginia Secondary Schools Athletic Commission, and compete in the Mountain State League. HHS athletic teams are nicknamed the Redskins, and the student section is nicknamed the Crazy Canes.

State Championships
Sport	Year(s)
Baseball	2002, 2014, 2018, 2022
Golf (boys)	2007, 2008, 2009
Soccer (boys)	2012, 2017
Soccer (girls)	2018
Softball	2013, 2015, 2016, 2017, 2018, 2019
Track and field (boys)	2018
Track and field (girls)	2008, 2014
Girls’ Tennis	2022
Boys' Tennis	2022

== Performing arts ==
Hurricane's competitive marching band won state championships in 2006, 2007, and 2008. The percussion and color guard sections picked up Class B state championships in 2019.

HHS has two competitive show choirs, the mixed-gender "Red Hot" and the all-female "Heat Wave". The school has both hosted and won West Virginia state championships. The show choirs also host an annual competition in late January, entitles the Red Hot Championship.

== Notable alumni ==
- Doc Holliday, football player and coach
- Alex Wilson, former professional baseball player
- Lauren Oyler, author and critic
- Tyler Payne, professional baseball player
- Dara Dean, STARrchitect
- Ali Vance, Award Winning Bluegrass Musician
