= Winfield High School (West Virginia) =

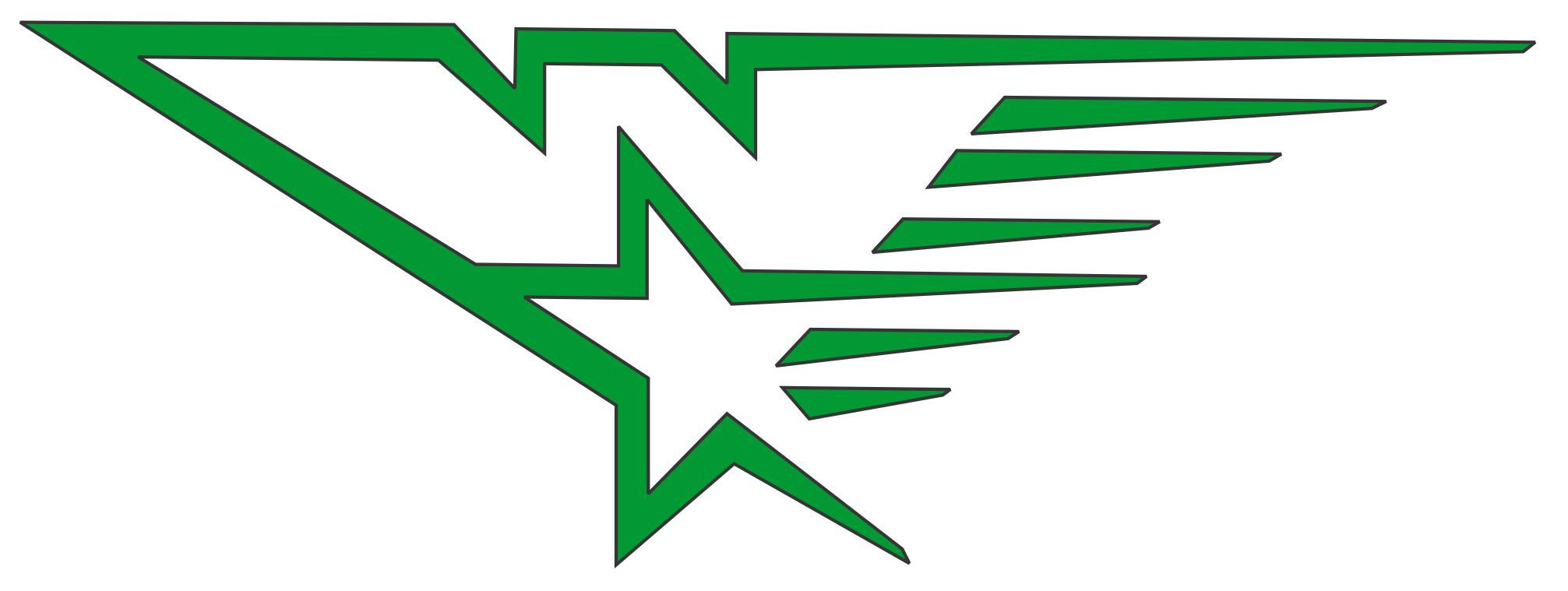

Location
- 3022 Winfield Road; Winfield, WV 25213; 38.53828°N 81.87833°W

Information
- Type: Public high school
- School district: Putnam County Schools
- Principal: Pamela Morris
- Grades: 9-12
- Enrollment: 792 (2024-25)
- Colors: Green and white
- Nickname: Generals
- Website: Official website

Winfield High School is a high school located on the banks of the Kanawha River in Winfield, West Virginia. The community is a rural town, located halfway between Huntington and Charleston, and the school is in the Putnam County Schools school district.

Winfield High School is the newest of the four high schools in Putnam County. The school mascot is The General and official school colors are Green and White, with Black also commonly used. The school yearly houses about 800 students.

The current building opened in 1980, prior to that what is currently Winfield Middle School housed students in grades 6-12. Winfield High underwent major expansion in 2006 to compensate for the extreme overcrowding of the school and to update many of the facilities. The 6 million dollar project was completed in the fall of 2007. A New Additional Gymnasium and Updates of the various seating were finished in 2012. After several years at the Class AA, Winfield was reclassified as a Class AAA school by the WVSSAC in the fall of 2008. Winfield also competed as a Class A school until the late 60's, giving them the unusual distinction of being a member of all three classes during their history. Winfield is a member of the Mountain State Athletic Conference (MSAC).

The facility and mascot were both named after Brevet Lieutenant General Winfield Scott (1786-1866) the longest serving general in American history and national hero. Scott served as a general officer in the United States Army from the War of 1812, Mexican War (captured Mexico City and became Military Governor), Black Hawk War, the Second Seminole War. He unsuccessfully ran for United States president against Franklin Pierce in 1852. Scott was the primary architect of the successful Union strategy during the Civil War but was too old to command in the field and retired in 1861.

== History ==
Gil McClanahan of WCHS-TV stated that administrators at Winfield High had touted their "atmosphere of inclusion", and Mcclanahan stated that there was "unique culture among faculty, staff and students".

== School demographics ==
The most recent statistics indicate that Winfield High School student body consists of the following racial/ethnic demographics:

91% White <2% Black <7% Other

== Awards and recognition for academics ==
In 2009 Winfield was honored by Business Week as being the top Academic School in West Virginia

- WV Exemplary School - 2002, 2003, 2004, 2005, 2006, 2007, 2008, 2009, 2010
- School of Excellence - 1993-1994, 2003–2004, 2006–2007
- WV Blue Ribbon School - 1996
- National Blue Ribbon School - 1996

== State championships ==
Baseball Class AA (1985, 2001, 2002, 2023)
Softball Class AA (2023, 2024)
Boys' Basketball Class AA(2004)
Girls' Basketball Class AA (2004, 2006)
Cheerleading Class AA (2003, 2018)
Football Class A (1960, 1961, 1963) Class AA (1985, 1987)
Boys' Golf Class AA (2004, 2023)
Girls' Soccer One Class Only (1995, 1996, 1997) Class AAA (2012, 2013, 2014, 2015) Class AA/A (2016)
Boys' Soccer "Class AA" (2018)
Girls' Swimming One Class Only (2010)
Boys' Track and Field Class AA/A(1997, 1998) Class AA (2004, 2005, 2006, 2007, 2008, 2017, 2019, 2022, 2024)
Girls' Track and Field Class AA/A (1998) Class AA (2003, 2004, 2005, 2007, 2008, 2017, 2019, 2021, 2022, 2023, 2024) Class AAA (2015,2016)
Girls' Volleyball Class AA (2006)
Girls' Cross Country Class AA (2017, 2018, 2021)
Boys' Cross Country Class AA (2021)
Boys' Tennis Class AA/A (2018)
Girls' Tennis Class AA/A (2017, 2018)

== Notable teachers ==
- Virginia Mae Brown, set many "first woman" records.
