= Washington High School (West Virginia) =

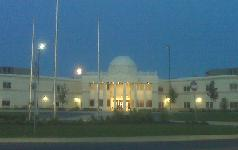

Location
- 300 Washington Patriot Drive; Charles Town, West Virginia 25414; United States
- 39.259929°N 77.882321°W

Information
- Type: Public high school
- School district: Jefferson County Public Schools
- Principal: Donald Showen
- Teaching staff: 76.50 (FTE)
- Grades: 9–12
- Enrollment: 1,384 (2023-2024)
- Student to teacher ratio: 18.09
- Colors: Red, white, and blue
- Mascot: Patriot
- Nickname: Washington
- Website: whs.jcswv.org

Washington High School is a 9–12 public high school in Charles Town, West Virginia, United States. The population growth in the county required a "de-consolidation" in 2007, as the single county high school, formerly known as Jefferson County High School, established in 1972, was renamed simply Jefferson High School, and the county split into two zones, with the eastern half of the county attending the new Washington High School.
