= Hedgesville High School =

High school in Hedgesville, West Virginia, United States

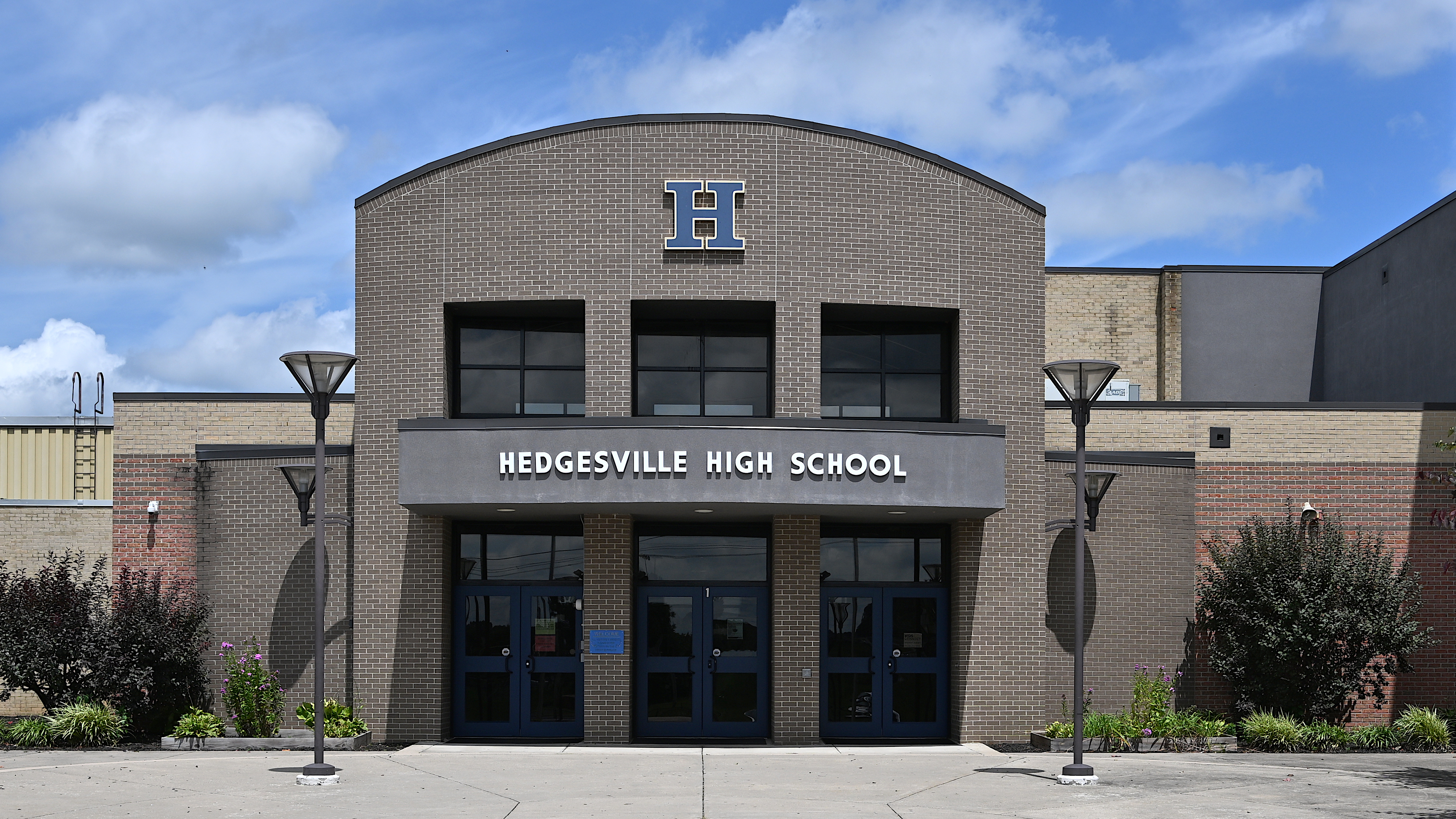
- Main entrance

Location
- 109 Ridge Road North; Hedgesville, West Virginia; United States; 39°32′14.26″N 77°58′54.5″W

Information
- Type: High school, public
- Established: 1866
- Principal: Angie Miliman
- Teaching staff: 93.41 (FTE)
- Grades: 9–12
- Enrollment: 1,407 (2023-2024)
- Student to teacher ratio: 15.06
- Colors: Navy and gold
- Mascot: Eagle
- Website: Hedgesville High School

Hedgesville High School is located in Hedgesville, West Virginia, United States. Enrollment is around 1,300. Its mascot is the Eagle, and its colors are blue and gold.

== History ==
Hedgesville High School began as a one-room log schoolhouse in 1866. The building was torn down and a new brick building was erected in 1884. A new high school building was erected in 1976.

In 2004, U.S. President George W. Bush visited the school.

== Athletics ==
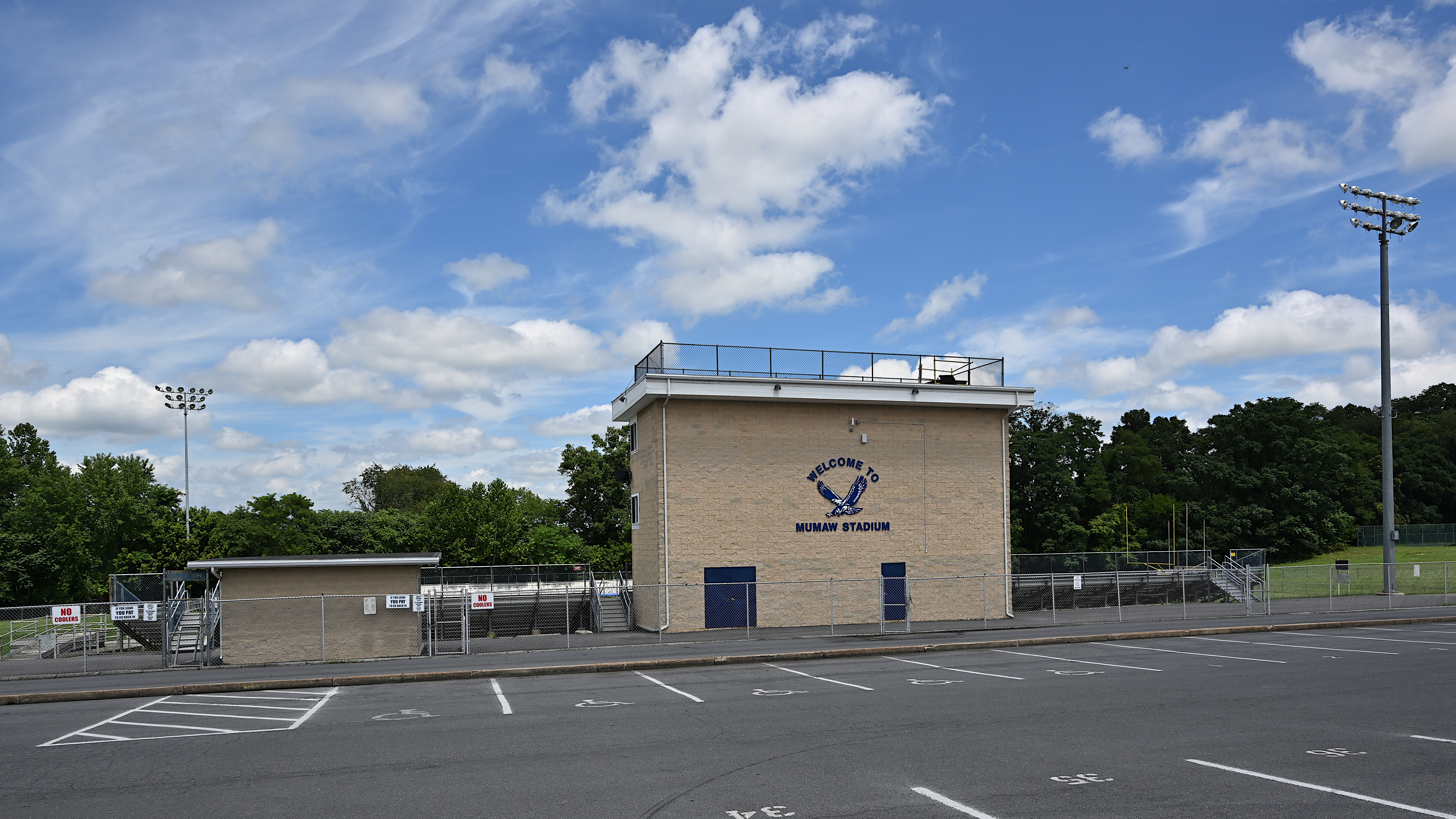
Mumaw Stadium at Hedgesville High School

Sports are governed by the West Virginia Secondary School Activities Commission (WVSSAC). The track team won the Class AAA state title in 1995, 2009, and 2017. The boys' basketball team won the 2012 AAA West Virginia State Championship. The baseball team also won state in 2013.

Hedgesville's marching band is part of the Tournament of Bands marching band competition program. On October 22, 2011, the band scored an 88.0 at their Chapter 13/WV State Championship competition at Lewis County High School. At the Atlantic Coast Championship tournament on October 30, 2011, the band scored an 86.55.

== Notable alumni ==
- Saira Blair - class of 2014; elected to the West Virginia House of Delegates in November 2014 at age 18
- QJ Peterson, basketball player
- Gale Catlett - former Head basketball coach for West Virginia University
- Chase DeLauter, baseball player for the Cleveland Guardians
