= 2007 West Virginia High School Boys' Soccer =

West Virginia High School Soccer State Tournament
- Season: 2007
- Dates: November 2 – 3, 2007
- Champions: George Washington (1st title)
- Top goalscorer: Victor Garcia (27 goals)

The 2007 West Virginia High School Boys' Soccer State Tournament (AAA) was a statewide high school soccer competition held in West Virginia, United States. The tournament was organized by the West Virginia Secondary School Activities Commission (WVSSAC) and featured boys' teams from high schools across the state. The tournament took place from November 2–3, 2007, at the Cline Stansberry Soccer Complex in Beckley, West Virginia.

== Format ==
This was the last year of the unifyed system – where all schools can compete in the same level, with no distinguishing of number of students. The teams played between 18 and 20 games on the regular season, they later were ranked based on their ratings. This ranking defined their seeds on the sectional and regional tournament (4 Regions divided in 4 sections each based on geographic locations).

Each Section had a champion and they played in a final four for the Region title.

Each of the 4 regional champion team qualified for the State Tournament.

The State Tournament was played in a single-elimination format, with the winner of each game advancing to the next round.

== Ranking ==
On the regular season each high school played between 18 and 20 games statewide, and one game between High Schools from other state.

The final Ranking was based on ratings (which computes a pontuation depending on the result and the team played).

2007 West Virginia High School Soccer Ranking
School	# State	Rating	Record (W-L-T)
St. Joseph Central	1	26.98	(18–1–1)
Woodrow Wilsonn	2	25.50	(13–1–3)
Parkersburg	3	25.12	(16–2–2)
Linsly	4	24.21	(16–2–1)
Morgantown	5	23.04	(11–2–1)
Robert C. Byrd	6	21.90	(16–2–1)
Princeton	7	20.47	(14–3–2)
Parkersburg South	8	19.68	(11–6–3)
Hurricane	9	19.32	(16–3–1)
George Washington	10	18.92	(12–4–3)
Winfield	11	18.88	(12–3–2)
Preston	12	18.69	(11–4–3)
East Fairmont	13	18.27	(13–6–1 )
Oak Hill	14	18.26	(12–3–2 )
Martinsburg	15	17.64	(9–4–5)
Brooke	16	16.60	(10–4–3)
Capital	17	16.50	(13–6–1)
Fairmont Senior	18	16.24	(10–8–1 )
Jefferson	19	15.98	(11–5–4 )
Cabell Midland	20	15.69	(9–5–2)

== Regionals ==
=== Regional 1 ===
Sectional semi-finals
Brooke	4
Weir	2
Section 1
University	3
Chapmanville Regional	0
Linsly	1
North Marion	0
Section 2
Wheeling Park	4
John Marshall	1
Scott	0
Morgantown	2
Section 3
Preston	3
Logan	2
Ravenswood	0
Fairmont Senior	4
Section 4
East Fairmont	3
South Harrison	0

Sectional Finals
Brooke(a.e.t.)	2
University	1
Linsly	0
Wheeling Park	3
Morgantown	1(4)
Preston	1(3)
Fairmont Senior	0
East Fairmont	1

Regional semi-finals
Brooke	2
Wheeling Park	1
Morgantown	3
East Fairmont	1

Regional Final
Brooke	0
Morgantown	2

=== Regional 2 ===
Sectional semi-finals
Buckhannon-Upshur	3
Bridgeport	0
Section 1
Martinsburg	1
Hedgesville	0
Pocahontas County(a.e.t.)	1
Washington	0
Section 2
Sissonville	1
Robert C. Byrd	3
Berkeley Springs	2
Williamstown	0
Section 3
Elkins	1
Webster County	0
Hampshire	6
Lincoln	1
Section 4
Jefferson	2
Charleston Catholic	1

Sectional Finals
Buckhannon-Upshur	3
Martinsburg	0
Pocahontas County	2
Robert C. Byrd	5
Berkeley Springs	1
Elkins	0
Hampshire	1
Jefferson	3

Regional semi-finals
Buckhannon-Upshur	1
Robert C. Byrd(a.e.t.)	3
Berkeley Springs	1
Jefferson	2

Regional Final
Robert C. Byrd	0
Jefferson	1

=== Regional 3 ===
Sectional semi-finals
George Washington	6
Riverside	0
Section 1
Capital	3
South Charleston	1
Woodrow Wilsonn	5
St. Albans	1
Section 2
Oak Hill	7
Nicholas County	0
Greenbrier East	3
Bluefield	2
Section 3
James Monroe	2
Princeton	10
Shady Spring	2
Independence	1
Section 4
PikeView	3
MSU Academy	0

Sectional Finals
George Washington	4
Capital	1
Woodrow Wilsonn	6
Oak Hill	0
Greenbrier East	3(3)
Princeton	3(2)
Shady Spring	4
PikeView	0

Regional semi-finals
George Washington(a.e.t.)	2
Woodrow Wilsonn	0
Greenbrier East	3
Shady Spring	1

Regional Final
George Washington	4
Greenbrier East	1

=== Regional 4 ===
Sectional semi-finals
Hurricane	7
Lincoln County	1
Section 1
Ripley	2(2)
St. Joseph Central	2(3)
Wheeling Central Catholic	0
Point Pleasant	1
Section 2
Cabell Midland	3
Preston	1
Winfield	6
Lewis County	0
Section 3
Huntington	8
Spring Mills	1
Parkersburg South	4
Cross Lanes	1
Section 4
Parkersburg	3
Poca	0

Sectional Finals
Hurricane	2
St. Joseph Central	0
Point Pleasant	1
Cabell Midland	0
Winfield	2
Huntington	3
Parkersburg South	0
Parkersburg	3

Regional semi-finals
Hurricane	3
Point Pleasant	1
Huntington	1
Parkersburg	4

Regional Final
Hurricane	3
Parkersburg	1

=== State Tournament – Beckley, WV ===
The State Tournament was played in a single-elimination format, with the winner of each game advancing to the next round. The seeds were based on the regional champions, therefore Regional champion No. 5 Morgantown faced Regional 4 champion No. 9 Hurricane and the other semi-final was between Regional 3 champion No. 10 George Washington vs Regional 2 Champion No. 19 Jefferson.

State semi-finals
Regional 1 Champion	Morgantown	0
Regional 4 Champion	Hurricane	2
Regional 3 Champion	George Washington	2
Regional 2 Champion	Jefferson	1

State Championship Game
Hurricane	0
George Washington	1

==== State semi-finals ====
November 2, 2007
10:00 GMT-4

Morgantown	0–2	Hurricane
		Ryan Gdula 3'; Brooks Paine 63'

YMCA Youth Sports Complex
November 2, 2007
12:00 GMT-4

George Washington	2–1	Jefferson
Jake Stevens 10'; Nick Claudio 65'		Will Corley 57'

YMCA Youth Sports Complex

==== State Championship Game ====
November 3, 2007
13:30 GMT-4

Hurricane	0–1	George Washington
		P.J. Wolfe 24'

YMCA Youth Sports Complex

Champion
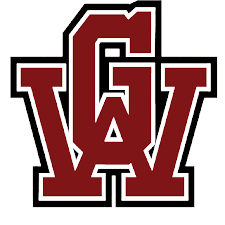
George Washington
(1st Title)
