= Harrison H. Kennedy Award =

U.S. high school sports award in West Virginia

The Harrison H. Kennedy Award, often known simply as the Kennedy Award, is a high school sports award named for the late Wheeling, West Virginia native Harry H. Kennedy. It is given annually to the West Virginia High School Football Player of the Year as voted on by the West Virginia Sports Writers Association. It is awarded every spring at the annual Victory Awards Dinner. It is the second oldest statewide award, second only to the Hardman Award, which is presented to the Amateur Athlete of the Year.

== Winners ==
Year	Winner	Class	School	Position
1947	Darrell Patrick Shires	Jr.	Hinton	RB
1948	Randy Broyles	Sr.	Woodrow Wilson	RB
1949	Henry (Hoppy) Shores	Sr.	Stonewall Jackson	RB-DB
1950	Jim Early	Sr.	Parkersburg	RB
1951	Dale Boyd	Sr.	Huntington Vinson	QB
1952	Don Griffith	Sr.	Stonewall Jackson	QB
1953	Bob Barrett	Sr.	Barboursville	RB
1954	Noel Whipkey	Sr.	Charleston	RB-LB
1955	Ronald (Tags) Meredith	Sr.	St. Albans	QB
1956	Johnny Frye	Sr.	Huntington East	QB
1957	Jim Bargeloh	Sr.	Parkersburg	RB
1958	Larry Drake	Sr.	Fairmont Senior	RB
1959	Fred Colvard	Sr.	Logan	QB
1960	Bob Kelley	Sr.	Weir	RB-DB
1961	Paul Allen	Sr.	Huntington	RB
1962	Joe White	Sr.	Charleston Catholic	RB
1963	Jim Smithberger	Sr.	Welch	DB-RB
1964	Frank Criniti	Sr.	Charleston Catholic	RB
1965	Melvin Walker	Sr.	Dunbar	QB
1966	No Award			
1967	No Award			
1968	David Morris	Sr.	Wayne	DB-RB
1969	Kerry Marbury	Sr.	Monongah	RB-DB
1970	Rick Hurt	Sr.	Charleston	QB
1971	Rick Petty	Sr.	Williamstown	RB-DB
1972	Danny Williams	Jr.	DuPont	QB
1973	Danny Williams	Sr.	DuPont	QB
1974	Robin Lyons	Sr.	Herbert Hoover	RB-LB
1975	Robert Alexander	Jr.	South Charleston	RB
1976	Robert Alexander	Sr.	South Charleston	RB
1977	Mike Estes	Sr.	George Washington	QB
1978	Curt Warner	Sr.	Pineville	RB-DB
1979	Tim Stephens	Sr.	Parkersburg South	QB
1980	David Bayer	Sr.	George Washington	RB
1981	John Koontz	Sr.	Petersburg	RB-DB
1982	Brad King	Sr.	North Marion	RB
1983	Tony Johnson	Sr.	Morgantown	RB
1984	Joel Wilson	Sr.	Sistersville	RB-LB
1985	Ted Kester	Sr.	Winfield	LB-RB
1986	Jeff Swisher	Sr.	Sistersville	RB
1987	Jed Drenning	Sr.	Tucker County	QB
1988	Keith Jeter	Sr.	Weir	RB-DB
1989	David Mayfield	Sr.	Morgantown	DB-RB
1990	Eric McGhee	Sr.	Wheeling Central	RB-DB
1991	Darryl Johnson	Sr.	Wheeling Park	RB
1992	Mark Cisar	Jr.	Magnolia	QB-DB
1993	Mark Cisar	Sr.	Magnolia	QB-DB
1994	Randy Moss	Sr.	DuPont	WR-DB
1995	Frank Aliveto	Sr.	Hedgesville	RB-LB
1996	J. R. House	Soph.	Nitro	QB
1997	Chris Yura	Jr.	Morgantown	RB-DB
1998 (tie)	J. R. House	Sr.	Nitro	QB
1998 (tie)	Quincy Wilson	Sr.	Weir	RB-DB
1999	Todd Mosby	Sr.	Musselman	QB-LB-DB
2000	Mark Wigal	Sr.	Morgantown	RB-DB
2001	Marc Kimes	Sr.	Parkersburg	QB-DB
2002	Brandon Barrett	Jr.	Martinsburg	WR-DB
2003	Brandon Barrett	Sr.	Martinsburg	WR-DB
2004	Nate Sowers	Sr.	Martinsburg	QB-DB
2005	Josh Culbertson	Sr.	Nitro	RB-DB
2006	Kyle Allard	Sr.	Fairmont Senior	QB
2007	Jordan Roberts	Sr.	Scott	RB
2008	Will Cole	Sr.	Bluefield	QB
2009	Tyler Harris	Jr.	South Charleston	QB-LB
2010	Justin Fox	Sr.	Magnolia	QB-DB
2011	Ryan Switzer	Jr.	George Washington	RB-DB
2012	Ryan Switzer	Sr.	George Washington	RB-DB
2013	Chazzy Thomas	Sr.	Morgantown	RB
2014	Kashuan Haley	Sr.	Capital	RB
2015	Tyrhee Pratt	Sr.	Capital	QB
2016	Jeremy Dillon	Jr.	Mingo Central	QB-S
2017	Latrell “Mookie” Collier	Sr.	Bluefield	RB-DB
2018	Connor Neal	Sr.	Fairmont Senior	QB
2019	Ethan Payne	Jr.	Poca	RB
2020	Blake Hartman	Sr.	Musselman	RB
2021	Atticus Goodson	Sr.	Independence	RB
2022	Judah Price	Sr.	Independence	RB
2023	Dom Collins	Sr.	Princeton	WR
2024	Koi Fagan	Sr.	Martinsburg	QB
2025	Brad Mossor	Sr.	Princeton	WR

== Awards won by school ==
This is a list of the schools who have had a player win a Kennedy Award once or more. In total, players from 44 different schools have won a Kennedy Award.

School	Awards won
Morgantown	5
George Washington	4
Martinsburg	4
Dupont	3
Fairmont Senior	3
Magnolia	3
Nitro	3
Parkersburg	3
South Charleston	3
Weir	3
Bluefield	2
Capital	2
Charleston	2
Charleston Catholic	2
Independence	2
Musselman	2
Princeton	2
Sistersville	2
Stonewall Jackson	2
Barboursville	1
Dunbar	1
Hedgesville	1
Herbert Hoover	1
Hinton	1
Huntington	1
Huntington East	1
Huntington Vinson	1
Logan	1
Monongah	1
Mingo Central	1
North Marion	1
Parkersburg South	1
Petersburg	1
Pineville	1
Poca	1
Scott	1
St. Albans	1
Tucker County	1
Wayne	1
Welch	1
Wheeling Central	1
Wheeling Park	1
Williamstown	1
Winfield	1
Woodrow Wilson	1
