= Gazette-Mail Kanawha County Majorette and Band Festival =

Marching band festival in West Virginia

- Genre: Performing arts festival
- Frequency: Annually, typically last Tuesday of September
- Venue: University of Charleston Stadium at Laidley Field
- Location: Charleston, West Virginia
- Coordinates: 38.344048°N 81.615158°W
- Years active: 1947 – 2019; 2021 – present
- Inaugurated: September 1947; 79 years ago
- Most recent: September 29, 2026; 36 days ago
- Sponsor: Charleston Gazette-Mail

The Gazette-Mail Kanawha County Majorette and Band Festival is an annual music festival dedicated to the public high school marching bands and majorette corps in Kanawha County, West Virginia. Established in 1947, it is the longest-running music festival in West Virginia and is held at the University of Charleston Stadium at Laidley Field in Charleston at the end of September each year, typically the last Tuesday. The 2026 festival was the 79th event and the Festival Grand Champion was Riverside High School for a second consecutive year while the 2026 Miss Kanawha Majorette was Maci Rucker from Herbert Hoover High School.

The inaugural 1947 event was attended by nearly 25,000 people. The festival was originally sponsored by the Charleston Daily Mail newspaper and was originally known as the Daily Mail Kanawha County Majorette and Band Festival, but as of 2015, it is sponsored by the Charleston Gazette-Mail after the Daily Mail merged with the Charleston Gazette, subsequently also renaming the festival. The only year the event was not held was in 2020 due to the COVID-19 pandemic.

== The JoAnn Jarrett Holland Memorial Scholarship Fund ==
A $2,500 scholarship was awarded to the girl who placed first in the feature twirler competition. This was an annual award given each year at the festival. The scholarship honored the memory of JoAnn Jarrett Holland, who won the competition in 1949 and 1950. Not only did she excel at this event, but she also supported it by attending the festival each year for the rest of her life. In 1973 her daughter, Kathi Holland Burton, won this competition and went on to be the feature twirler at West Virginia University for seven years. This award has since been discontinued.

== WVU and Marshall exhibition shows ==
Each year the Majorette and Band Festival features an exhibition by one of the state's two NCAA Division I college marching bands. Prior to 2020, on odd numbered years, West Virginia University's Mountaineer Marching Band, "The Pride of West Virginia", would perform in exhibition, while Marshall University's "Marching Thunder performed on the even numbered years. Due to the COVID-19 pandemic, the 2020 festival was cancelled, and upon it resuming in 2021, the bands have switched to Marshall performing on odd numbered years and WVU performing on even numbered years.

== High school bands ==
There are currently eight public high schools in Kanawha County, West Virginia. All participate in the festival.

Current High Schools:

- Capital High School, Charleston, West Virginia
- George Washington High School, Charleston, West Virginia
- Herbert Hoover High School, Elkview, West Virginia
- Nitro High School, Nitro, West Virginia
- Riverside High School, Quincy (Belle, West Virginia)
- St. Albans High School, St. Albans, West Virginia
- Sissonville High School, Pocatalico (Sissonville, West Virginia)
- South Charleston High School, South Charleston, West Virginia

Former High Schools:

- Charleston High School, Charleston, West Virginia; closed in 1989
- Dunbar High School, Dunbar, West Virginia; closed in 1990
- DuPont High School, DuPont City (Belle, West Virginia); closed in 1999
- East Bank High School, East Bank, West Virginia; closed in 1999
- Stonewall Jackson High School, Charleston, West Virginia; closed in 1989

== Previous Miss Kanawha Majorettes ==
The title of Miss Kanawha Majorette is awarded to the one girl who is the outstanding majorette of the evening of those competing in the category. The first girl to be named Miss Kanawha Majorette was Dolores Thompson in 1947. An annual tradition of being named Miss Kanawha Majorette is returning the next year to present the award to that year's Miss Kanawha Majorette with the trophy, tiara, and bouquet of flowers. A girl cannot be named Miss Kanawha Majorette for two consecutive years, however, it is possible for a girl to be named it twice.

Juliana Kemp from South Charleston High School is the only majorette to win the title of Miss Kanawha Majorette twice, once in 2003 and again in 2005.

Herbert Hoover High School has the most Miss Kanawha Majorette wins with a total of 11. South Charleston High School has the second most wins at 10; although they had only nine different girls win, one girl, Juliana Kemp, won it twice. Next to them is George Washington High School, Sissonville High School, and the former DuPont High School with eight wins; the former Charleston High School had seven; St. Albans High School, Capital High School, and the former Stonewall Jackson High School are tied with six; Riverside High School has three; and Nitro High School and the former Dunbar High School and East Bank High School are tied at two.

- 2026 – Maci Rucker, Herbert Hoover
- 2025 – Emma Elkins, George Washington
- 2024 – Sailor Lucas, Herbert Hoover
- 2023 – Mia Bartoli, George Washington
- 2022 – Caroline Dysart, Herbert Hoover
- 2021 – Anna Payne, George Washington
- 2019 – Sydney Moore, St. Albans
- 2018 – Gabbie Mullins, Riverside
- 2017 – Lauren Carnell, Capital
- 2016 – Carrie Long, George Washington
- 2015 – Kaitlyn Cline, George Washington
- 2014 – Olivia Carnell, Capital
- 2013 – Emma Rhodes, St. Albans
- 2012 – Taylor Freeland, George Washington
- 2011 – Heather Ryan, Herbert Hoover
- 2010 – Alexandra Ameli, George Washington
- 2009 – Casey Jarvis, Capital
- 2008 – Kandis Courtney, Riverside
- 2007 – Chelsea Morton, Herbert Hoover
- 2006 – Stevi Ryder, Herbert Hoover
- 2005 – Juliana Kemp, South Charleston
- 2004 – Mandy Jo Wingo, Riverside
- 2003 – Juliana Kemp, South Charleston
- 2002 – Ashley Parsons, Capital
- 2001 – Megan Tucker, Herbert Hoover
- 2000 – Christal Kirk, Herbert Hoover
- 1999 – Laura Hanna, Capital
- 1998 – Jessica Smith, DuPont
- 1997 – Kristen Tucker, Herbert Hoover
- 1996 – Heather Anderson, Herbert Hoover
- 1995 – Julie Keenan, DuPont
- 1994 – Beth Miller, South Charleston
- 1993 – Susan Booth, Sissonville
- 1992 – Kim Jarrett, Sissonville
- 1991 – Sarah Lang, Capital
- 1990 – Leigh Ann Dolan, Sissonville
- 1989 – Jill Pazerski, George Washington
- 1988 – Katie Hodges, Stonewall Jackson
- 1987 – Kristie Roberts, South Charleston
- 1986 – Lisa White, DuPont
- 1985 – Kim Randolph, Stonewall Jackson
- 1984 – Lori Began, South Charleston
- 1983 – Kim O'Conner, South Charleston
- 1982 – Karen Persinger, DuPont
- 1981 – Kelly Ellis, Charleston
- 1980 – Shannon Snodgrass, DuPont
- 1979 – Michelle Noe, Charleston
- 1978 – Ursula Smith, St. Albans
- 1977 – Donna Rowley, Sissonville
- 1976 – Debbie Wilkinson, Sissonville
- 1975 – Dawn Bailey, Sissonville
- 1974 – Jenny Lynn Phyllips, East Bank
- 1973 – Kathy Jo Light, DuPont
- 1972 – Bobbie Coleman, Charleston
- 1971 – Judy Boggess, Nitro
- 1970 – Kay Bennett, Charleston
- 1969 – Kathy Wingo, Charleston
- 1968 – Janie Coffman, Sissonville
- 1967 – Karen Schoonover, South Charleston
- 1966 – Donna Tickle, Stonewall Jackson
- 1965 – Beth Fleshman, Herbert Hoover
- 1964 – Betty Conner, Sissonville
- 1963 – Sandy Limer, East Bank
- 1962 – Jenny Doty, St. Albans
- 1961 – Phyllis Zabel, Stonewall Jackson
- 1960 – Jeannie Irvin, Dunbar
- 1959 – Patti Bostic, South Charleston
- 1958 – Nina Hatfield, Stonewall Jackson
- 1957 – Brenda Sullivan, DuPont
- 1956 – Frances Snyder, Nitro
- 1955 – Judy Thrall, Charleston
- 1954 – Eleanor Carney, Dunbar
- 1953 – Jean Thompson, St. Albans
- 1952 – Barbara Jean Tucker, St. Albans
- 1951 – Joyce Ballard, DuPont
- 1950 – Patty Hendrickson, Stonewall Jackson
- 1949 – Mathilde Bodkin, South Charleston
- 1948 – Phyllis Walker, Charleston
- 1947 – Dolores Thompson, South Charleston

== Previous Festival Grand Champions ==
Before 1970, there was no award for Festival Grand Champion. That year was the first year the championship was awarded and Herbert Hoover High School was the first school to win the Festival Grand Championship. Prior to 2013, "The Star-Spangled Banner" was played by the previous year's Festival Grand Champion; beginning in 2013, the competing bands combined performed the National Anthem, which was reduced to one band in 2024 by selection.

Capital High School is the only school to have won the Festival Grand Championship for 11 consecutive years (2004–2014). The second most consecutive wins is five, which is tied by Herbert Hoover High School (1980–1984) and George Washington High School (2017–2019, 2021–2022; a festival was not held in 2020 due to the COVID-19 pandemic). Capital High School also has the most total wins at 18. Next to them is George Washington High School with 13 wins; then Herbert Hoover High School with nine wins; Nitro High School with five; St. Albans High School and the former DuPont High School with three wins; Sissonville High School and Riverside High School with two wins; and the former Charleston High School with one win. South Charleston High School and the former Dunbar High School, East Bank High School, and Stonewall Jackson High School have never won the Festival Grand Championship.

- 2026 – Riverside High School
- 2025 – Riverside High School
- 2024 – Nitro High School
- 2023 – Sissonville High School
- 2022 – George Washington High School
- 2021 – George Washington High School
- 2019 – George Washington High School
- 2018 – George Washington High School
- 2017 – George Washington High School
- 2016 – Capital High School
- 2015 – Nitro High School
- 2014 – Capital High School
- 2013 – Capital High School
- 2012 – Capital High School
- 2011 – Capital High School
- 2010 – Capital High School
- 2009 – Capital High School
- 2008 – Capital High School
- 2007 – Capital High School
- 2006 – Capital High School
- 2005 – Capital High School
- 2004 – Capital High School
- 2003 – Nitro High School
- 2002 – Capital High School
- 2001 – Nitro High School
- 2000 – George Washington High School
- 1999 – George Washington High School
- 1998 – George Washington High School
- 1997 – Capital High School
- 1996 – George Washington High School
- 1995 – Capital High School
- 1994 – George Washington High School
- 1993 – Capital High School
- 1992 – George Washington High School
- 1991 – George Washington High School
- 1990 – Capital High School
- 1989 – Capital High School
- 1988 – Herbert Hoover High School
- 1987 – Herbert Hoover High School
- 1986 – George Washington High School
- 1985 – DuPont High School
- 1984 – Herbert Hoover High School
- 1983 – Herbert Hoover High School
- 1982 – Herbert Hoover High School
- 1981 – Herbert Hoover High School
- 1980 – Herbert Hoover High School
- 1979 – Charleston High School
- 1978 – Sissonville High School
- 1977 – Herbert Hoover High School
- 1976 – Nitro High School
- 1975 – St. Albans High School
- 1974 – DuPont High School
- 1973 – St. Albans High School
- 1972 – St. Albans High School
- 1971 – DuPont High School
- 1970 – Herbert Hoover High School
