= Jordan Roberts (American football) =

American gridiron football player (born 1990)

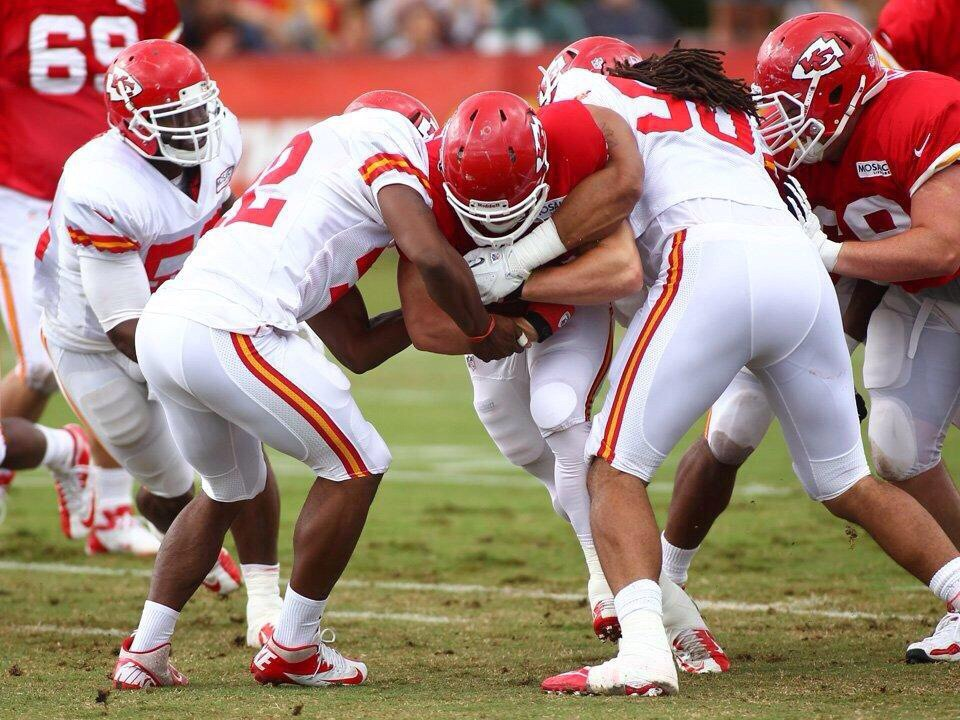
- Jordan Roberts Chiefs

Profile
- Position: Running back/Returner

Personal information
- Born: May 29, 1990 (age 36); Charleston, West Virginia, U.S.
- Listed height: 5 ft 10 in (1.78 m)
- Listed weight: 222 lb (101 kg)

Career information
- High school: Madison (WV) Scott
- College: Charleston
- NFL draft: 2013: undrafted

Career history
- Kansas City Chiefs (2013)*; Ottawa Redblacks (2014)*; Blacktips (2014); Wichita Falls Nighthawks (2015)
- * Offseason or practice squad member only

Awards and highlights
- 2× All-American (2011, 2012); WVIAC Offensive Player of Year (2012)

Jordan Taylor Roberts (born May 29, 1990) is a retired American football running back. He was first signed by the Kansas City Chiefs for the 2013 NFL season, but signed with Ottawa later that year after his release. He played "college football" for the Charleston Golden Eagles. Roberts ran a 4.49 40 at his pro day in front of 8 NFL scouts at Fairmont State. Roberts set the single game (301), single season (1,572), career rushing records (3,383) and career all-purpose yards (4,918) at Charleston ... Earned first-team all-conference and all-region as a junior and senior, and second team All-American in 2011 and third-team All-American in 2012 ... On November 10, 2012, he scored five touchdowns and set the NCAA Division II rushing record for a half (273) en route to 301 total yards.

== Early life ==
Roberts graduated from Scott High School in Madison, West Virginia, in 2008. He currently lives in Grapevine, Texas. At Scott, Roberts received 1st team all-state honors as a running back and quarterback in his senior and junior seasons, and was the Harrison H. Kennedy Award Winner in 2007. He was also an EA Sports All-American for runningback and quarterback. Roberts was also selected to play in the Max-Emfinger All-American game which was in Jackson, Mississippi where he had a break-out week and may have been the biggest sleeper prospect in the game. Roberts showed quick moves and break-away speed in the game in which he scored a 22-yard TD. He also delivered several big hits on special teams for the East. Among other things his statistics during his senior season included rushing for 3,826 yards a state record, 11.36 yards per carry, 48 rushing touchdowns, 32.3 yards average a punt return, 36.3 average a kick-off return, 686 yards passing, 7 passing touchdowns, 1 interception return touchdown, 115 tackles, and a combined 56 touchdowns in a season.

== College career ==
Roberts began his career at West Virginia University. He took a redshirt his freshman season and earned Scout Team Player of the Year. His redshirt freshman year in the Blue-Gold Spring Game he had a 65-yard touchdown on the first string defense. Despite his Spring game production he only received time that year on special teams recording 5 tackles. He opted to transfer after his redshirt freshman year to the University of Charleston in West Virginia. While playing as a running back and kick returner for the University of Charleston Golden Eagles he has accumulated 4,918 career yards, in three seasons and 50 touchdowns. In his 2012 season he rushed for 1,572 yards, including 6.6 yards per carry that season. He had 238 carries and accounted for 21 touchdowns (18 rushing, 1 throwing, 1 kick-off return) and also threw a 2-point conversion. He also was dangerous his senior season as a return man when they actually kicked him the ball with 13 returns for 389 yards averaging 29.92 per return and a 100-yard kick-off return for touchdown. He also blocked 2 kicks on special teams, and one resulted in a safety. In his 2011 senior season he led Charleston in rushing a West Virginia Conference best as a team 2,480 which is 225.5 average per game. In his junior season Roberts rushed for 1,430 yards, including 6.9 yards per carry that season – more than any other player in NCAA Division 2 with over 200 carries. He had 206 carries and scored 18 touchdowns. Roberts also finished 3rd in the Nation in All-Purpose Yards with 2,274 which was 206.73 yards per game and an 8.99 All-Purpose Yards per Play. Roberts also led the WVIAC in kick-off return average with 25.7 kick-off return average on 26 returns for 667 yards. In 2010, he rushed for 11 touchdowns and had 1 receiving, which was a team best 12 touchdowns. Roberts was 2nd team all-conference during his sophomore season. Roberts is 5 feet, 10 inches tall and weighed 222 pounds during his junior football season and is going to be a senior for the 2012 season. Roberts is a 2013 National Football League Prospect. Roberts has broken 2 NCAA records and 9 school records at the University of Charleston. Roberts was an All-American running back and all-purpose selection on two different All-American lists. In his junior campaign, Roberts became the Golden Eagles' school record holder in rushing yards with 1,430 and all-purpose yards with 2,274 in a season. In 2012 Roberts led his team to a 9–2 record, Roberts earned WVIAC Player of the Year Offense Award. In his final game as a Golden Eagle, Roberts shattered the NCAA Division II record for most rushing yards in a quarter (190) and most rushing yards in a half (273) on his way to a single game school record (301) rushing yards and 5 touchdowns (despite only playing 1 offensive series in the 2nd half). Roberts led the WVIAC in rushing with (1,572), rushing yards per game with (142.91), all-purpose yards (2,167), total touchdowns (21) and points per game (11.1). Roberts also blocked 2 punts and averaged (29.92) yards per kick-off return, taking one return 100 yards for a touchdown. Among all NCAA Division II football players, Roberts ranked 1st in total all-purpose yards, 3rd in all-purpose yards per game, 4th in scoring and 5th in rushing yards per game. He was named WVIAC Offensive Player of the Week four times and WVIAC Special Teams Player of the Week once. Roberts is the all-time leading rusher in school history racking up 3,383 yards in his 3 years at the University of Charleston. Roberts did not fumble at all during his senior season.

Roberts was invited to play in 4 post-season all-star bowl games, including the Aztec Bowl in Mexico, where he led the U.S.A. team to a 49–20 victory. In the Aztec Bowl, Roberts rushed for a touchdown (2 others were called back due to no fault of his own), returned a kick-off for a touchdown, blocked 2 punts and made a few special teams tackles. Many fans and coaches in attendance felt Roberts would have earned MVP honors if the touchdowns were not called back. Nonetheless, Roberts shined in front of an international crowd on a big stage. Roberts is also known for the Harrison H. Kennedy Award, which he won in 2007, given to the best player in the state of West Virginia.

=== College statistics ===
| Year | G | Rushing Attempt | Rushing Yards | Rushing TD | Rushing Average | Pass Receptions | Pass Reception Yards | Pass Reception TDs | Return Attempts | Return Average | All-Purpose Yards |
|---|---|---|---|---|---|---|---|---|---|---|---|
| 2010 | 10 | 79 | 381 | 11 | 4.8 | 5 | 96 | 1 | 0 | 0 | 477 |
| 2011 | 11 | 206 | 1,430 | 17 | 6.9 | 20 | 165 | 1 | 26 | 25.7 | 2,274 |
| 2012 | 11 | 238 | 1,572 | 18 | 6.6 | 20 | 204 | 1 | 13 | 29.92 | 2,167 |

== Professional career ==
=== Predraft ===
Pre-draft measurables
| Height | Weight | Arm length | Hand span | Wingspan | 40-yard dash | 10-yard split | 20-yard split | 20-yard shuttle | Three-cone drill | Vertical jump | Broad jump | Bench press |
|---|---|---|---|---|---|---|---|---|---|---|---|---|
| 5 ft 10 in (1.78 m) | 222 lb (101 kg) | 30 1/4 in (0.77 m) | 9 1/2 in (0.24 m) | 6 ft 0 in (1.83 m) | 4.49 s | 1.53 s | 2.61 s | 4.33 s | 7.05 s | 38.0 in (0.97 m) | 10 ft 7 in (3.23 m) | 29 reps |
All values from Pro Day

=== Kansas City Chiefs ===
Roberts was invited to the Kansas City Chiefs rookie minicamp. Following the minicamp, he was signed to a contract. Roberts was used as a Runningback, Fullback, and Returner by the Chiefs. However, he only earned game time as a Fullback. He had one catch against the New Orleans Saints for 9 yards. On August 25, 2013, he was cut by the Chiefs.

=== Ottawa Redblacks ===
On December 3, 2013, Roberts signed with the Canadian Football League's Ottawa Redblacks. Roberts was released by Ottawa on June 3, 2014, prior to Training Camp.

=== Florida Black Tips ===
Signed November 3, 2014, for the last game of the Fall Experimental Football League (FXFL) on November 7, 2014, against the Brooklyn Bolts. Saw action on all special teams in the game. Roberts started all week as the teams running back until the Black Tips signed Tim Hightower a few days before the game. Hightower was signed shortly after the game to a contract with the New Orleans Saints.

=== Wichita Falls Nighthawks ===
In 2015, Roberts signed with the Wichita Falls Nighthawks of the Indoor Football League (IFL). Roberts asked for his release on May 14, 2015, and on May 18, 2015, Roberts was officially released to explore other opportunities in football. Roberts ran 3 touchdowns, while also catching 1 touchdown in 5 Games. He also had 6 special teams tackles and had a return of 17 yards despite limited time as a returner and rarely being used on a struggling team. Roberts played most of the season recovering from a Medial Meniscus injury to his left knee but is completely healed now. The Nighthawks record was (2-1) when he was starting Runningback. Roberts also did a lot of community service and local events while being a member of the Wichita Falls Nighthawks.
