= John Harriman =

John Harriman may refer to:

- John Harriman (botanist) (1760–1831), English botanist
- John Harriman (Star Trek), a fictional Star Trek captain
- John Emery Harriman, inventor of an aerocar in 1906

== See also ==
- John Harriman House, a historic house in West Virginia
