= Raleigh County Schools =

Public school district in Raleigh County, West Virginia

Raleigh County School District

Address
- 105 Adair Street Beckley, West Virginia, 25801; United States

District information
- Motto: "Making a difference one student at a time"
- Established: 1850; 176 years ago
- Superintendent: Serena Starcher
- NCES District ID: 5401230

Students and staff
- Enrollment: 10,797 (2021-2022)
- Staff: 781.00 (on an FTE basis)
- Student–teacher ratio: 13.82

Other information
- Website: boe.rale.k12.wv.us

Raleigh County Schools is a public school district in Raleigh County, West Virginia, located at 105 Adair Street, in the county seat of Beckley, West Virginia. The school district operates 27 public schools, including 17 elementary schools (PK through 5), 5 middle schools (6 through 8), and 4 high schools (9 through 12). The district also maintains a career-technical education center for high school students and adults. The current superintendent is Dr. Serena Starcher.

== Board of education ==
The Board of Education is made up of five members, each elected to a four-year term in a nonpartisan election. The Board appoints the superintendent.

Member	Position
Larry Ford	President
Richard V. Snuffer II	Vice-president
Dr. Charlotte Hutchens	Member
Marie Hamrick	Member
Jack Roop	Member

== Schools ==
=== Elementary schools ===
- Bradley Elementary
- Clear Fork District Elementary
- Coal City Elementary
- Cranberry-Prosperity Elementary
- Crescent Elementary
- Daniels Elementary
- Fairdale Elementary
- Ghent Elementary
- Hollywood Elementary
- Mabscott Elementary
- Maxwell Hill Elementary
- Stanaford Elementary
- Shady Spring Elementary
- Marsh Fork Elementary
- Stratton Elementary
- Beckley Elementary
- Ridgeview Elementary

=== Middle schools ===
- Trap Hill Middle School
- Park Middle School
- Shady Spring Middle School
- Independence Middle School
- Beckley-Stratton Middle School

=== High schools ===
- Academy of Careers and Technology (formerly Raleigh County Vocational Technical Center)
- Independence High School
- Liberty High School
- Shady Spring High School
- Woodrow Wilson High School

=== Former schools ===
- Beaver Elementary
- Central Elementary
- Cirtsville Elementary
- Crab Orchard Elementary
- Eccles Elementary
- Fireco Elementary
- Glen Leigh Grade
- Harper Heights Grade
- Institute Elementary
- Lester Elementary
- Lincoln Elementary
- Morton-Reaves Grade
- Mt. View Elementary
- Odd Elementary
- Pettus Elementary
- Piney View Elementary
- Princewick Elementary
- Rhodell Elementary
- Richmond Elementary
- Scarbro Elementary
- Skelton Elementary
- Slab Fork Grade
- Sophia-Soak Creek Elementary
- Stoco Elementary
- Sylvia Elementary
- Teel Elementary
- Trap Hill Elementary
- West Wickham Elementary
- Beaver Jr. High
- Beckley Jr. High
- Eccles Jr. High
- Killarney Jr. High
- Rhodell Jr. High
- Sophia Jr. High
- Stoco Jr. High
- Stratton Jr. High
- Beckley High
- Clear Fork High
- Collins High
- Lester High
- Mark Twain High
- Marsh Fork High
- Stratton High
- Stoco High
- Sophia High
- Trap Hill High

== Notable alumni ==
- Rob Ashford, Broadway choreographer/Tony Award Winner
- Jim Justice, Billionaire, Owner of The Greenbrier resort and 36th Governor of West Virginia
- Steven C. Johnson, member of the Maryland House of Delegates
- Doug Legursky, Former NFL player
- Jon McBride, First and only West Virginian Astronaut
- Nick Rahall, former United States Congressman
- Chris Sarandon, actor
- Tamar Slay, former NBA player for the New Jersey Nets and Charlotte Bobcats
- Hulett C. Smith, 27th Governor of West Virginia
- Morgan Spurlock, filmmaker
