= Katie Sierra free speech case =

US free speech case regarding political activism in school

- Date: October 22, 2001 – July 12, 2002
- Location: Pocatalico, West Virginia
- Participants: Katie Sierra, Amy Sierra, Forrest Mann, Kanawha County Board of Education
- Outcome: Controversy becomes international cause célèbre, focused on student rights, anarchism, the post–September 11 anti-war movement, and the new sociopolitical landscape of post-9/11 American society.
- Verdict: Judgment in favor of the plaintiff awards Katie Sierra with symbolic $1 in damages; state refuses further appeals.

In October 2001, Katie Sierra was suspended from Sissonville High School, near Charleston, West Virginia, for activism in opposition to the War in Afghanistan. Sierra, a 15-year-old anarchist pacifist, wore shirts bearing handwritten statements against the war and had unsuccessfully petitioned her principal to start an afterschool anarchist club that would promote peace and nonviolence. Following an incident with another student, Sierra was suspended for three days for disrupting the educational process.

Following a heated school board meeting that escalated the incident, the American Civil Liberties Union assisted Sierra in filing of a free speech lawsuit against the school district and her principal. Following verbal threats and physical assaults, Sierra's mother withdrew her from the school. While a circuit court initially upheld her suspension in November, a trial by jury in July 2002 concluded that Sierra had been justly suspended and forbidden to wear political shirts, but had been improperly denied the right to start a club. Sierra briefly returned to Sissonville High School in August 2002 before again withdrawing over peer harassment after less than a week.

The case garnered national and international media attention as a prominent freedom of speech case and symbol of post-September 11 American society.

== Background ==
Katie Sierra was born in Panama. Her parents, Amy and Raul, were a nurse and a computer programmer, respectively, who had met in Eastern Kentucky University. Sierra's mother had been raised in a military family, with multiple relatives having served. Sierra's parents separated after several years, and her and her mother moved frequently. By the time she moved to Sissonville, West Virginia, a town near the state's capital, in June 2001, Sierra had attended over a dozen schools across the United States, from Florida to New Mexico. While she had no prior history of academic or behavioral issues and was used to acclimating to new environments, Sierra clashed with her Sissonville High School classmates' culture, especially in the pro-war fervor following the 2001 September 11 attacks. Students in the high school tended towards traditional social roles, flew the Confederate flag, enrolled in Junior Reserve Officers' Training Corps, and were almost universally white. In contrast, Sierra, 15 years old and in ninth grade, identified as an anarchist pacifist and opposed both the War in Afghanistan and all forms of violence. An online community of other American youth interested in anarchism, for Sierra, was her alternative to a Sissonville youth culture she found unsatisfactory.

Sierra said she began the practice of wearing T-shirts with handwritten political statements long before the September 11 attacks. The statements were, in turns, about peace, anti-racism, or more controversially, protesting the War in Afghanistan. One such example of the latter said "Against Bush, Against Bin Laden". Others depicted an upside-down American flag or mocked war supporters. Sierra denied being anti-American and said she sought to change her country out of love for it.

== Suspension ==
Dismayed by both the September 11 attacks and the resulting war in Afghanistan, Sierra set out to start an anarchist club at her high school as a means to promote peace and pacifism. Her charter for the club would include non-tolerance of violence and hate, undoing the popular association between anarchism and violence, and activities including readings, discussions, and community service. Her mother advised against pursuing the club.

On Monday, October 22, 2001, Sierra sought the permission of her high school principal, Forrest Mann, to start her club, citing the West Virginia Department of Education's policy that allowed afterschool clubs such as the Christian Fellowship Club and Civics Club. Cutting her off, the principal denied her request outright. Sierra said that when she pressed for his rationale, he repeatedly told her to return to class and said he said he would review her materials later but not change his position. That night, watching television images of Afghani children killed as collateral damage in the war, Sierra wrote to a friend about feeling helpless and needing to take action. She wrote in black marker on a red T-shirt she would wear the next day: "When I saw the dead and dying Afghani children on TV, I felt a newly recovered sense of national security. God bless America." The shirt contained other political messages on peace and anti-racism.

Sissonville students noticed her shirt the next day. She wanted them to talk with her about the war. Students in her English class asked to see her printed flyers for the club, which they viewed and returned. A student sitting behind her in the class, Jacob Reed, reacted by telling her to leave the country if she did not like it, using an expletive. Sent to the principal's office, Reed relayed that Sierra's shirt had intimated that "America should burn" and "I hope Afghanistan wins". He received detention during lunch for yelling. The principal saw Sierra in his office about Reed's statement and the flyers on her desk. Sierra, who was wearing a sweatshirt, held that the flyers were with her personal belongings and offered to show her shirt, which he refused. The principal suspended Sierra from school for three days on the charge of disrupting the educational process, both for having not followed his prior order to desist flyering for the club and for upsetting other students. The principal confiscated the flyers and told Sierra that her political shirts were not allowed. Sierra was required to have a psychologist's clearance before she could return to school.

Sierra, suspended, contacted the American Civil Liberties Union, who agreed to take up her cause. The issue was considered settled after a meeting between Sierra, the ACLU, Sierra's mother, and the principal, until a school board meeting on October 29, the day of Sierra's return to school. The meeting discussed the events of the previous week, and some board members were initially sympathetic to Sierra, but she was soon shouted down, accused of treason and likened to a traitor. Sierra fled the meeting in tears. The following day, The Charleston Gazette published claims about Sierra's shirt slogans that repeated what the principal said he had heard from Reed. The principal later said he had been misquoted, but the news story had already spread throughout the city. Students spat on Sierra's mother's car at Sissonville High, and her friends' parents wouldn't give her rides home from school. Threats, taunting, jeering by her fellow students escalated into physical assaults, and Sierra's mother pulled her out of school; the threats would ultimately cause Sierra to move out of the town.

== Lawsuit ==
The ACLU supported Sierra in filing a lawsuit against the school district and principal Forrest Mann for violation of Sierra's First Amendment rights to free speech. Circuit Court Judge James Stucky rejected Sierra's request for a preliminary injunction on November 2, ruling that her rights to free speech were subject to not disrupting the school, which her anarchy club and political shirts would do. Stucky further declared that he could not guarantee her safety at Sissonville High School. The West Virginia Supreme Court voted 3-2 in November against hearing Sierra's case. While American network television did not cover Sierra's case, apart from Court TV, there was considerable interest from the Japanese broadcast media.

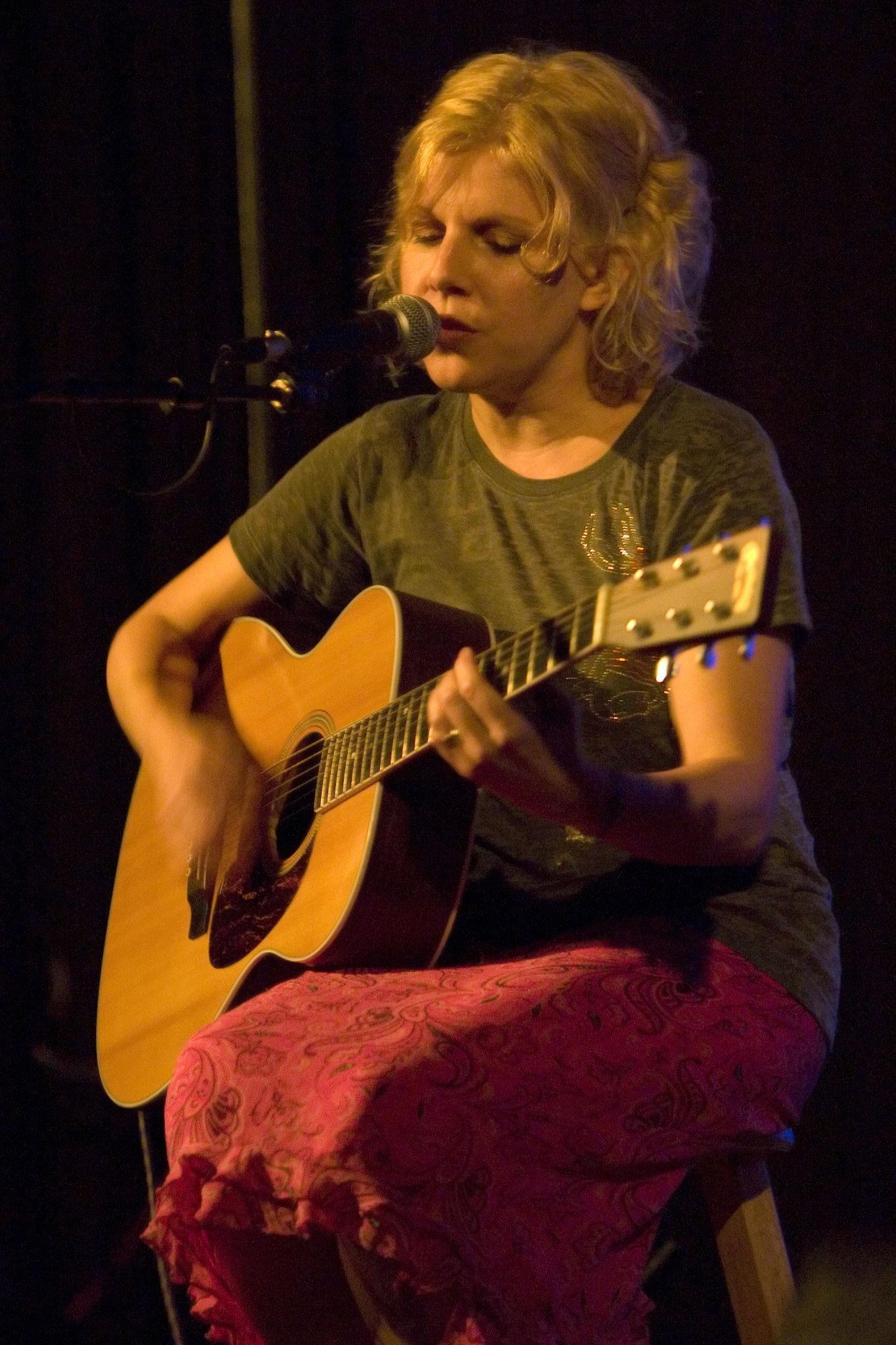
Indie rock guitarist Tanya Donelly encountered Katie Sierra while the latter ran away from home. Donelly's attempts to convince Sierra to return home proved futile.

Motivated by boredom and antipathy towards what she saw as the narrow-mindedness of her town, Sierra ran away from home on April 8, 2002, accompanied by a 24-year-old friend. They hitched rides with truckers to Raleigh, North Carolina, where they took in a concert by Tanya Donelly. The musician unsuccessfully attempted to convince them to return home. While Sierra successfully eluded the police, her mother and her private detective found Sierra's friend. Sierra continued alone to South Carolina where she stayed with a friend. Her mother and the detective found and returned Sierra to West Virginia after tracing her phone calls to friends. In June 2002, the ACLU lawyers briefly dropped Sierra's suit after learning that she would not be at the trial but instead traveling through Oregon. They reversed this decision a day later after consulting with Sierra's mother, who had to file the suit on behalf of her daughter, who remained a minor at the time.

Sierra's trial lasted five days in July 2002. To packed galleries, Sierra's pro bono lawyers, Jason Huber and Roger Forman, argued that Mann was responsible for the school's disruption, having not taught his students about tolerance and constitutional rights and having exacerbated the situation with misleading comments to the media. The defense argued that student freedom of speech was limited so as to not impede the rights of fellow students to an education. Testifying witnesses included Sierra's English teacher Jean McCutcheon and the student who had been disciplined for his comments to Sierra, Jacob Reed. The philosophy of anarchism was also a point of contention during the trial. A local adjunct philosophy professor testified as Sierra's final witness, including explanations of the philosophy espoused by Sierra's proposed club, its impact on American social and political movements, and the notion that anarchists had historically been unjustly persecuted in American courts, citing such examples as the trials of the Haymarket affair and Sacco and Vanzetti. The lawyer for the school officials countered that anarchism had prominent ties to terrorism and assassination, and referred to Timothy McVeigh and Theodore Kaczynski as anarchists. The court ruled that Sierra had been justly suspended and forbidden to wear the T-shirts, but had been improperly denied the right to start a club, and awarded her the $1 in damages she sought. The trial was covered by Court TV and aired nationally in August. Following the case, attorneys for both parties asked Judge Stucky to throw out the jury's verdict for being internally inconsistent, encouraging him to instead issue a ruling himself.

== Return to school ==
The ban on her right to return to the school having been lifted, Sierra returned to Sissonville High School in August 2002. In her first week back at the school, she was harassed, mocked, and insulted by other students. Principal Forrest Mann had resigned from the school following the controversy, and had been replaced by a new principal, Calvin McKinney. He identified Sierra's "questionable attire"—a T-shirt of punk band Anti-Flag—as a possible trigger of her negative reception. Although she had secured a sponsor for the anarchist club, McKinney did not grant his approval, citing the need for a lengthy legal confirmation process. After attending Sissonville High for five days, Sierra dropped out of the school. Judge Stucky subsequently ruled that she would be allowed to sit General Educational Development tests, which would let her to apply for university in lieu of finishing high school. Sierra later worked a telemarketing job before attending West Virginia's Marshall University.

== Responses ==
External audio
- Sierra interview with Democracy Now!, December 11, 2001
- Sierra interview with CKLN-FM, December 13, 2001

The controversy over Sierra's suspension and the subsequent trial drew local, national and international media attention. Sierra's lawyers and the Charleston Gazette's Editorial pages editor credited the community's antipathy towards Sierra to the inaccurate statements about Sierra's political message that principal Forrest Mann had initially made to the local press. The Gazette wrote a year after the case that adults had exacerbated the backlash rather than teaching civics. Sierra recalled hearing local radio station callers wanting to physically hurt or deport her. The Charleston Daily Mail praised the circuit court's initial decision, describing the case as egocentric. Their editorial on the occasion of the full trial endorsed the jury's decision.

National observers weighed in on the case. John Tinker, the lead plaintiff from a 1969 free speech in schools Supreme Court case pledged his personal support for Sierra. Philosophy professor Crispin Sartwell praised Sierra as "an American heroine" whose actions contributed to rather than detracted from her peers' education. British political writer George Monbiot decried Sierra's treatment, citing it as an example of state persecution and the erosion of civil liberties in the United States, while journalist Amy Goodman characterized it as evidence of "a new McCarthyism". The Thomas Jefferson Center for the Protection of Free Expression gave the Kanawha school board and principal Forrest Mann its dubious "Jefferson Muzzle" award in 2002 for its role in the Sierra case.

Sierra's actions inspired United We Stand, a New York University drama project on America after September 11. Sierra was additionally a subject of Dale Maharidge's Homeland, a 2004 journalistic investigation of post-September 11 jingoism and suppression of dissent.

== Works cited ==
- Maharidge, Dale (2004). Homeland. New York: Seven Stories Press. ISBN 1-58322-627-3.
