= Dorian Etheridge =

American football player (born 1998)

Profile
- Position: Linebacker

Personal information
- Born: November 21, 1998 (age 27); Charleston, West Virginia, U.S.
- Listed height: 6 ft 3 in (1.91 m)
- Listed weight: 230 lb (104 kg)

Career information
- High school: Capital (Charleston, West Virginia)
- College: Louisville (2017–2020)
- NFL draft: 2021: undrafted

Career history
- Atlanta Falcons (2021–2022)

Awards and highlights
- Freshman All-American (2017)

Career NFL statistics
- Total tackles: 1
- Stats at Pro Football Reference

Dorian Etheridge (born November 21, 1998) is an American professional football linebacker. He played college football at Louisville.

== Early life ==
Dorian Etheridge was born on November 21, 1998, in Charleston, West Virginia. Etheridge attended Capital High School where he competed as an outside linebacker. While playing for Capital High, Etheridge received Two-Time All-State Selection Honors by the West Virginia Sports Writers Association.

== College career ==
Etheridge was a three-star prospect and tabbed the No. 6 player in West Virginia according to Rivals.com and the No. 50-ranked outside linebacker by ESPN. He committed to Louisville over West Virginia, Virginia Tech, Pittsburgh, Maryland, Purdue and Marshall. Etheridge played 4 years at Louisville as a linebacker. He appeared in 45 career games totaling 258 tackles, 24.5 tackles for loss, 4.5 sacks and one interception.

== Professional career ==
After going unselected in the 2021 NFL Draft, Etheridge signed as a free agent with the Atlanta Falcons on May 1, 2021. He made the Falcons roster out of training camp. He played in five games before being waived on November 2, 2021, and re-signed to the practice squad. He signed a reserve/future contract with the Falcons on January 10, 2022.

On August 30, 2022, Etheridge was waived/injured by the Falcons and placed on injured reserve. He was released on September 8. On October 18, 2022, Etheridge was signed to the Falcons' practice squad. He signed a reserve/future contract on January 9, 2023. He was waived on July 29, 2023.
