= Liberty High School (Glen Daniel, West Virginia) =

Coordinates: 37°47′42.3″N 81°19′58.2″W

Location
- 1700 Coal River Rd; Glen Daniel, West Virginia 25844

Information
- Type: Public secondary school
- Established: 1976
- School district: Raleigh County Schools
- NCES School ID: 540123000961
- Principal: Jamie Bailey
- Teaching staff: 33.00 (FTE)
- Grades: 9-12
- Enrollment: 459 (2023-2024)
- Student to teacher ratio: 13.91
- Campus type: rural
- Colors: Red, Black, White
- Mascot: Raiders
- Website: https://lhs.rale.k12.wv.us

Liberty High School, alternately referred to as Liberty-Raleigh or Liberty of Raleigh, is a consolidated high school in rural Raleigh County, West Virginia, located in the town of Glen Daniel, West Virginia. The names of Liberty and its sister school and rival Independence High School reflect the fact they were both built in 1976, the U.S. Bicentennial. Liberty was always intended to incorporate the previous Trap Hill, Clear Fork, and Marsh Fork high schools, but legal wrangling kept the later two from consolidation until the 1990s. Liberty currently has over 500 students. The school nickname is Raiders and its colors are red, black, and white.

== Notable alumni ==
Todd Kirby, graduated 2003
