= East Bank, West Virginia =

- Town
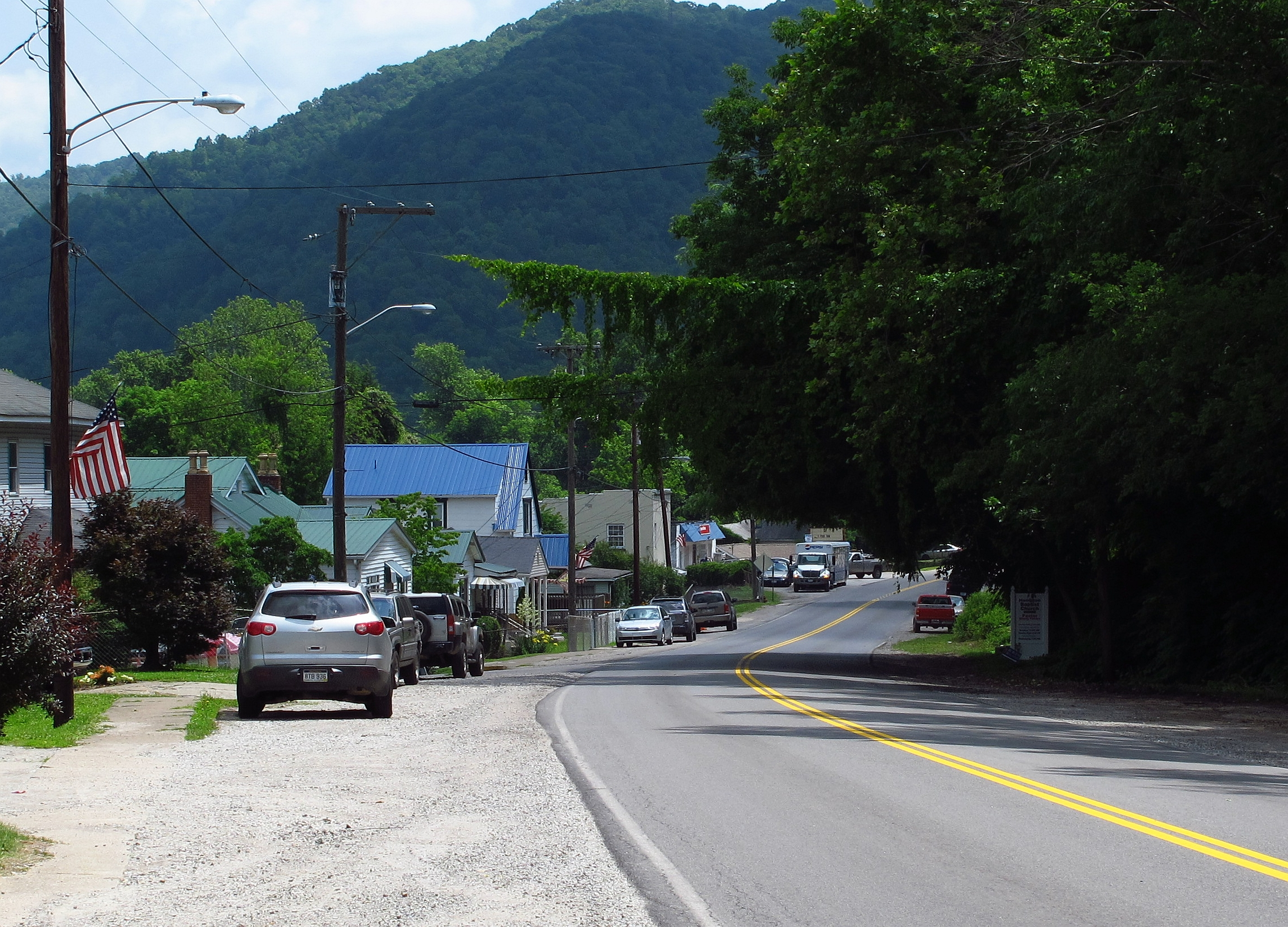
- WV 61 in East Bank

- Location of East Bank in Kanawha County, West Virginia.
- Coordinates: 38°13′1″N 81°26′39″W
- Country: United States
- State: West Virginia
- County: Kanawha
- Incorporated: 1889

Area
  - Total: 0.48 sq mi (1.25 km^{2})
  - Land: 0.48 sq mi (1.25 km^{2})
  - Water: 0 sq mi (0.00 km^{2})
- Elevation: 620 ft (189 m)

Population (2020)
  - Total: 822
  - Estimate (2021): 806
  - Density: 1,804.4/sq mi (696.67/km^{2})
- Time zone: UTC-5 (Eastern (EST))
  - Summer (DST): UTC-4 (EDT)
- ZIP code: 25067
- Area code: 304
- FIPS code: 54-23092
- GNIS feature ID: 1554348
- Website: https://alpha.townofeastbank.com/

East Bank is a town in Kanawha County, West Virginia, United States, situated along the Kanawha River. The population was 820 at the 2020 census.

== History ==
East Bank was incorporated in 1889 by special charter enacted by the West Virginia Legislature. It is so named on account of the town's location on the east side of the Kanawha River.

East Bank was the site of Cabin Creek District High School, erected in 1912. The first commencement ceremony graduated a class of three. CCDHS was eventually renamed East Bank High School, home of the Pioneers. The school colors were blue & white. A notable graduate was Hercules Renda, who played football at the University of Michigan and had a long career as a high school coach. EBHS also became known for alumnus Jerry West (nicknamed "Zeke from Cabin Creek"), who played basketball there, leading the Pioneers to a state championship in 1956. West went on to play at West Virginia University and for the Los Angeles Lakers. From 1912 until 1969, the school was located on WV Rt. 61 at Walnut Street.

In 1969, a new building was opened along the bank of the Kanawha River, at Brannen Street. The old building continued to stand and served until 1999 as East Bank Junior High School. East Bank High School was consolidated with nearby DuPont High School in 1999 to form Riverside High School at Diamond. Around this same time, Kanawha County Schools converted from the grade 7-9 junior high system to the grade 6-8 middle school system, and the 1969 building now houses East Bank Middle School.

The original 1912 building was demolished in 2003, but the lintel from the building's main entryway has been preserved. East Bank's town hall now occupies a separate building, which originally housed the high school & junior high's music and art classrooms. A Dollar General store occupies an adjacent portion of the property.

Pioneer Park, administered by Kanawha County Parks and Recreation, is adjacent to East Bank Middle School, and offers an outdoor swimming pool, miniature golf, a snack bar, and picnic shelters.

The John Harriman House was listed on the National Register of Historic Places in 1978.

== Geography ==
According to the United States Census Bureau, the town has a total area of 0.48 square miles (1.24 km^{2}), all land.

== Demographics ==
Historical population
Census	Pop.	Note	%±
1900	468		—
1910	551		17.7%
1920	586		6.4%
1930	476		−18.8%
1940	601		26.3%
1950	735		22.3%
1960	1,023		39.2%
1970	1,025		0.2%
1980	1,155		12.7%
1990	892		−22.8%
2000	933		4.6%
2010	959		2.8%
2020	822		−14.3%
2021 (est.)	806	▼	−1.9%
U.S. Decennial Census

=== 2010 census ===
As of the census of 2010, there were 959 people, 392 households, and 287 families living in the town. The population density was 1,997.9 inhabitants per square mile (771.4/km^{2}). There were 440 housing units at an average density of 916.7 per square mile (353.9/km^{2}). The racial makeup of the town was 98.1% White, 0.7% African American, 0.4% Native American, 0.1% Asian, and 0.6% from two or more races. Hispanic or Latino of any race were 0.3% of the population.

There were 392 households, of which 30.6% had children under the age of 18 living with them, 51.8% were married couples living together, 16.6% had a female householder with no husband present, 4.8% had a male householder with no wife present, and 26.8% were non-families. 24.2% of all households were made up of individuals, and 9.2% had someone living alone who was 65 years of age or older. The average household size was 2.42 and the average family size was 2.81.

The median age in the town was 45.2 years. 20.9% of residents were under the age of 18; 7.5% were between the ages of 18 and 24; 21.1% were from 25 to 44; 33.8% were from 45 to 64; and 16.8% were 65 years of age or older. The gender makeup of the town was 48.6% male and 51.4% female.

=== 2000 census ===
As of the census of 2000, there were 933 people, 373 households, and 276 families living in the town. The population density was 1,958.0 inhabitants per square mile (750.5/km^{2}). There were 415 housing units at an average density of 870.9 per square mile (333.8/km^{2}). The racial makeup of the town was 98.82% White, 0.96% African American, 0.11% Asian, and 0.11% from two or more races. Hispanic or Latino of any race were 0.11% of the population.

There were 373 households, out of which 27.3% had children under the age of 18 living with them, 57.1% were married couples living together, 14.2% had a female householder with no husband present, and 26.0% were non-families. 23.1% of all households were made up of individuals, and 13.1% had someone living alone who was 65 years of age or older. The average household size was 2.50 and the average family size was 2.95.

In the town, the population was spread out, with 22.7% under the age of 18, 9.3% from 18 to 24, 23.7% from 25 to 44, 26.8% from 45 to 64, and 17.5% who were 65 years of age or older. The median age was 41 years. For every 100 females, there were 88.1 males. For every 100 females age 18 and over, there were 83.0 males.

The median income for a household in the town was $35,341, and the median income for a family was $39,545. Males had a median income of $35,521 versus $22,045 for females. The per capita income for the town was $18,419. About 9.2% of families and 12.0% of the population were below the poverty line, including 18.0% of those under age 18 and 4.8% of those age 65 or over.

== Notable people ==
- Hercules Renda (1917–2005), football player and coach
- Jerry West (1938–2024), NBA player and executive
