= Anthony Bass (American football) =

American football player (born 1975)

No. 38, 32
- Position: Defensive back

Personal information
- Born: March 27, 1975 (age 51); St. Albans, West Virginia, U.S.
- Listed height: 6 ft 1 in (1.85 m)
- Listed weight: 192 lb (87 kg)

Career information
- High school: South Charleston (South Charleston, West Virginia)
- College: Bethune–Cookman (1994–1997)
- NFL draft: 1998: undrafted

Career history
- Minnesota Vikings (1998)*; Green Bay Packers (1998)*; Minnesota Vikings (1998–1999)
- * Offseason or practice squad member only
- Stats at Pro Football Reference

Anthony Emmanuel Bass (born March 27, 1975) is an American former professional football defensive back who played two seasons with the Minnesota Vikings of the National Football League (NFL). He played college football at Bethune–Cookman University.

== Early life and college ==
Anthony Emmanole Bass was born on March 27, 1975, in St. Albans, West Virginia. He attended South Charleston High School in South Charleston, West Virginia.

He lettered for the Bethune–Cookman Wildcats from 1994 to 1997.

== Professional career ==
Bass signed with the Minnesota Vikings on May 1, 1998, after going undrafted in the 1998 NFL draft. He was released on August 24, 1998.

He was signed to the practice squad of the Green Bay Packers on September 9, 1998, but was released three days later on September 12.

Bass was then signed to the Vikings' practice squad on September 17, 1998. He was promoted to the active roster on November 10 and played in three games that season without recording any statistics. He appeared in 14 games, starting three, for the Vikings during the 1999 season, totaling 17 solo tackles, three assisted tackles, one interception, and one pass breakup. Bass was released by the Vikings on August 14, 2000.

== Personal life ==
Bass is a pastor and founded the Endurance Church in Brooklyn Park, Minnesota.
