= Kanawha County Schools =

Public school district in West Virginia, U.S.

Location
- Charleston, West Virginia; United States

District information
- Type: Public School District
- Motto: Discover. Excel. Advance.
- Established: 1933
- Superintendent: Paula Potter

Students and staff
- Students: 26,000

Other information
- Website: https://kcs.kana.k12.wv.us

Kanawha County Schools is the operating school district within Kanawha County, West Virginia. It is governed by the Kanawha County Board of Education.

== Board of education ==
The Kanawha County Board of Education is constituted by five members, each elected to a four-year term in a nonpartisan election. The board appoints the superintendent.

The members are also paid $160 per meeting and are not allowed to exceed 50 meetings in a school year or else they will not be paid.

Current members:

Member	Position
Ric Cavender	President
Becky Jones Jordon	Member
Kate White	Member
Jim Joseph Crawford Sr.	Member
Michael Arbogast	Member

The superintendent is Paula Potter.

== Budget ==
Kanawha County Schools faced a multimillion-dollar budget crisis for the FY 2012, but had overcome the issue in time. Superintendent Duerring stated that school officials' two major goals, if the shortfall was to occur, is to maintain the current curriculum as much as possible, and not decrease employee wages or benefits.

In 2025 the Kanawha County Board of Education ratified a spending of $337 million for the 2026 fiscal year.

== Academic performance ==
=== No Child Left Behind ===
For the 2008–2009 school year, Kanawha was ranked as being "Below AYP - Status Needs Improvement in One Or More Accountability Cells." They did not meet AYP standards for 2008 or 2007 either.

Adequate Yearly Progress

Year	County meet AYP?	Number of schools meeting AYP	Percentage of schools meeting AYP
2009	No	52	76.5%
2008	No	57	83.8%
2007	No	57	83.8%
2006	No	59	88.1%

=== WESTEST 2 ===
WESTEST (West Virginia Educational Standards Test) 2 is defined by the WVDOE as "a custom-designed assessment for West Virginia students. The individual content assessments measure a student’s levels of performance on clearly defined standards and objectives and skills."

WESTEST 2/APTA Assessment (2008–09)

Subject	Percentage of students proficient
Math	58.37%
RLA	58.69%
Science	51.43%
Social Studies	55.79%

== Unions ==
AFT-Kanawha Local 4444 is the locally chartered union of the American Federation of Teachers. AFT-Kanawha represents only teachers in Kanawha County. Fred Albert is the president of AFT Local 4444. AFT-Kanawha is a local affiliate of AFT-West Virginia. All AFT local unions are affiliated with the National and WV AFL-CIO

The West Virginia School Service Personnel (WVSSPA) represents school service personnel in Kanawha County Schools. School service personnel include non-administrative office employees, aides, custodians, transportation, maintenance, and school meal providers. WVSSPA is a chartered local of AFT-WV.

The Kanawha County Education Association (KCEA) is an association of school administrators and teachers for this school district. Dinah Adkins is the president. It is a local affiliate of the West Virginia Education Association.

== Schools ==
The following schools are in Kanawha County Schools:

=== High schools ===
- Capital High School
- Herbert Hoover High School
- Nitro High School
- Riverside High School
- Sissonville High School
- South Charleston High School
- St. Albans High School
- George Washington High School

=== Middle schools ===
- John Adams Middle School
- DuPont Middle School
- Dunbar Middle School
- Elkview Middle School
- Hayes Middle School
- Andrew Jackson Middle School
- West Side Middle School
- Horace Mann Middle School
- McKinley Middle School
- South Charleston Middle School
- Sissonville Middle School

=== Elementary schools ===
- Alban Elementary School
- Alum Creek Elementary School
- Andrews Heights Elementary School
- Anne Bailey Elementary School
- Belle Elementary School
- Bridgeview Elementary School
- Cedar Grove Elementary School
- Central Elementary School
- Chamberlain Elementary School
- Chesapeake Elementary School
- Clendenin Elementary School
- Cross Lanes Elementary School
- Dunbar Primary School
- Dunbar Intermediate School
- Edgewood Elementary School
- Elk Elementary Center
- Flinn Elementary School
- Holz Elementary School
- Kanawha City Elementary School
- Kenna Elementary School
- Lakewood Elementary School
- Malden Elementary School
- Mary Ingles Elementary School
- Midland Trail Elementary School
- Montrose Elementary School
- Nitro Elementary School
- Overbrook Elementary School
- Piedmont Elementary School
- Pinch Elementary School
- Point Harmony Elementary School
- Pratt Elementary School
- Richmond Elementary School
- Ruffner Elementary School
- Ruthlawn Elementary School
- Sharon Dawes Elementary School
- Shoals Elementary School
- Sissonville Elementary School
- Mary C. Snow West Side Elementary School
- Weberwood Elementary School

=== Alternative schools ===
- Chandler Academy

=== Career and technical ===
- Ben Franklin Vocational Center
- Carver Career Center
- Garnet Career Center

== Former schools ==
=== Former high schools ===
- Booker T. Washington High School – Closed in 1956 when KCS was integrated and became Grant Junior High School, which closed in 1986.
- Clendenin High School (Clendenin, West Virginia) – Consolidated with Elkview High School to form Herbert Hoover High School in September 1963.
- Elkview High School (Elkview, West Virginia) – Consolidated with Clendenin High School in September 1963 to form Herbert Hoover High School.
- Cedar Grove High School (Cedar Grove, West Virginia) – Consolidated into DuPont High School, now Cedar Grove Middle/Elementary School.
- Charleston High School – Consolidated in 1989 with Stonewall Jackson into Capital.
- Dunbar High School – Consolidated into South Charleston HS in 1990.
- DuPont High School – Consolidated in 1999 with East Bank into Riverside, now DuPont Middle.
- East Bank High School – Consolidated in 1999 with Dupont into Riverside, now East Bank Middle.
- Garnet High School – Closed in 1956 when Kanawha County Schools was integrated, now serves as Garnet Career Center.
- Stonewall Jackson High School – Consolidated in 1989 with Charleston into Capital, now West Side Middle.

== See also ==
- Kanawha County Textbook Controversy
