= Charleston High School (West Virginia) =

Coordinates: 38°20′49.8″N 81°37′40.6″W

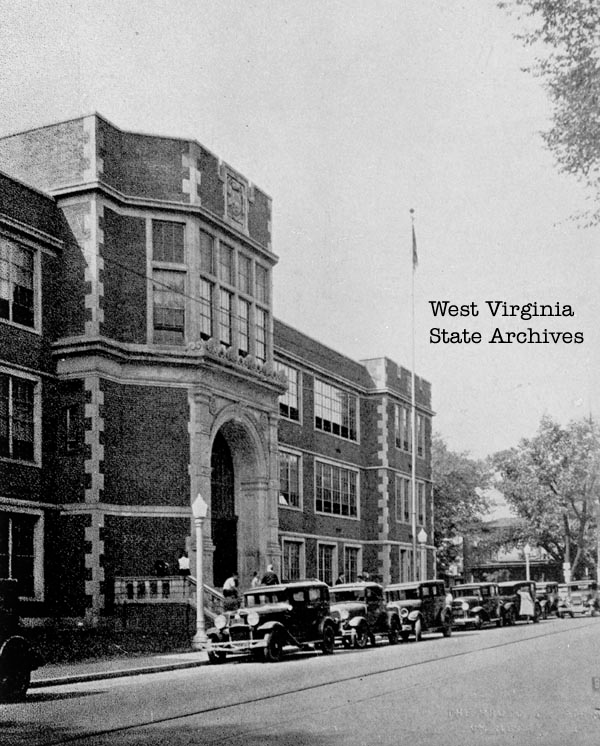
- Charleston High School, Washington Street entrance. From yearbook Charlestonian, 1933, West Virginia State Archives
- 1201 Washington Street East; Charleston, West Virginia 25301; United States

Information
- Former names: Kanawha County High School
- Type: Public
- Established: 1904
- Closed: 1989
- School district: Kanawha County School District
- Grades: 10-12
- Colors: Old Gold and Blue
- Mascot: Mountain Lion

Charleston High School is a former high school that was located on the east end of Charleston, West Virginia. The school was consolidated with Stonewall Jackson High School on the west side of Charleston in 1989 to form Capital High School. Located on multiple parts throughout Charleston during its existence, the final site was on a parcel bordered by Washington Street East, Brooks Street and Lee Street, adjacent from CAMC General Hospital.

== History ==
=== 1818–1915 ===
There were three Mercer Schools. Mercer Academy was built in 1818 on Quarrier and Hale Streets. The second Mercer School, constructed in 1888, was on the site of where the last Charleston High building was built. This building was used as a high school from 1888 to 1890, and then as a grade school from 1890 to 1903. The date of demolition is unknown. The Third Mercer school was built on Quarrier Street in 1903.

From 1876 to 1890, Union School was the first location which housed Kanawha County High School. With one principal, two teachers, and about 25 students, the first graduating class consisted of two women. Union School again temporarily housed Kanawha County High School in 1903. Kanawha County High School became Charleston High School a year later.

Charleston High School was moved from its first location at Union School to the third Mercer School. This was the first building constructed for the purpose of housing Charleston High School, on Quarrier Street, in 1904. In 1890, the high school was moved to the Mercer School building on Washington Street East and this building then housed Central Junior High School, Mercer Grade School, and the Board of Education. In 1970 it became a parking lot.

=== 1916–1989 ===
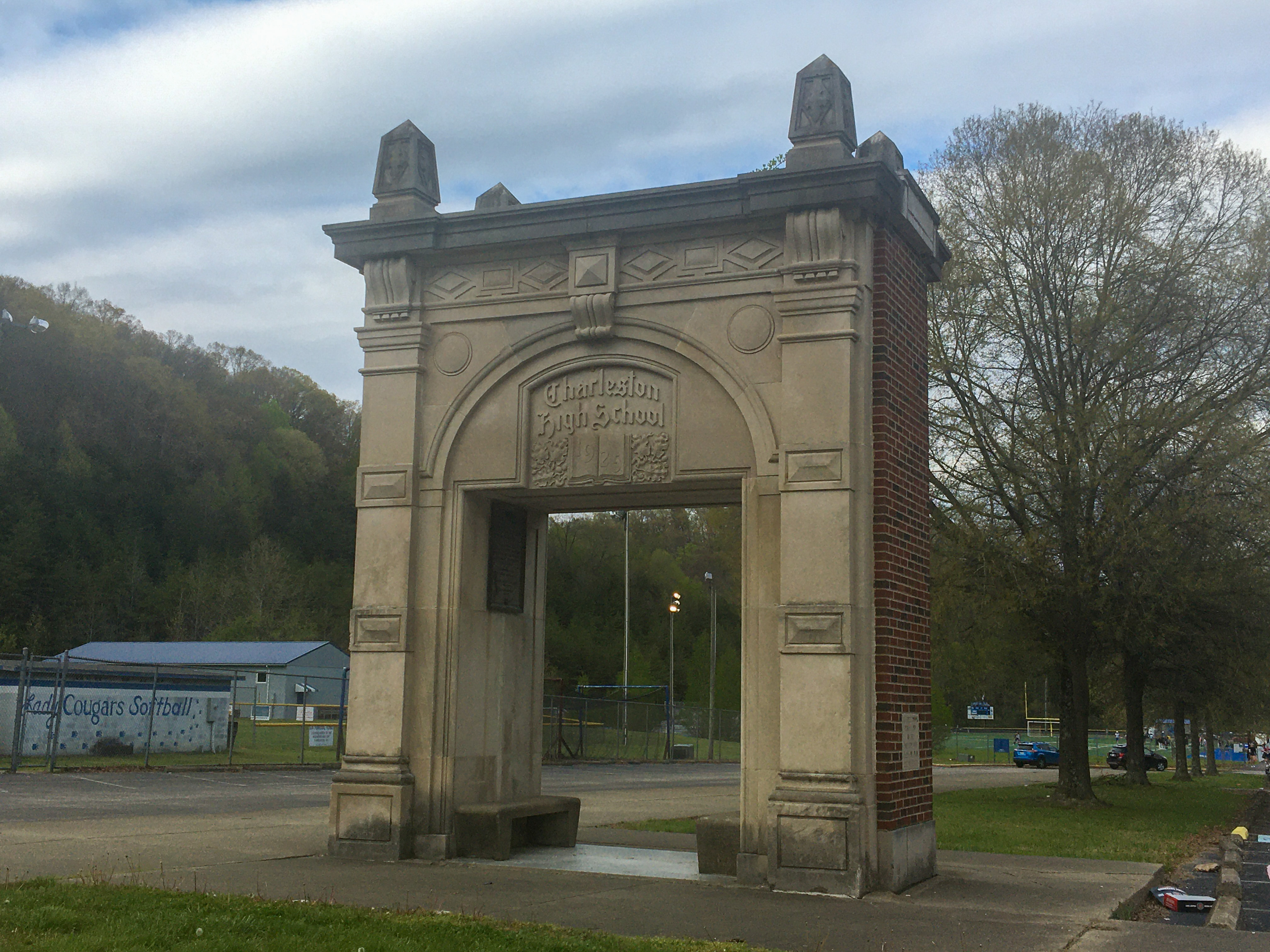
Lee Street's entry to Charleston High School, preserved on the grounds of Capital High School

The building for Charleston High School was opened in 1904 and was located on Quarrier Street just off Broad Street. This later became Mercer Elementary. The second Charleston High building was on the corner of Quarrier Street and Morris Street in downtown Charleston. It later became Thomas Jefferson Junior High School when the new building for Charleston High School was built on its final locale. The new building was on the site of the old Mercer School.

The new building was built in 1926, due to over-crowding in previous buildings. It was called "the big school." However, it also became over-crowded during the late 1930s, so Stonewall Jackson High School was built in 1940 to accommodate the students on the west side of Charleston.

As baby boom years continued, the need arose for another high school. In 1965, George Washington High School was built to accommodate the students in South Hills and Loudendale. During the 80s, the student populations at CHS and SJHS dropped. In 1989, Capital High School opened, combining the students of these two former rival schools, ending a 49-year rivalry.

Charleston High School was torn down in mid-1989 to make way for an outpatient surgery center for Charleston Area Medical Center. Stonewall Jackson High School was converted to a junior high school, which later became a middle school as it remains today. In 2020, the Kanawha County School Board voted unanimously to change the name to West Side Middle School.

== Memorial ==
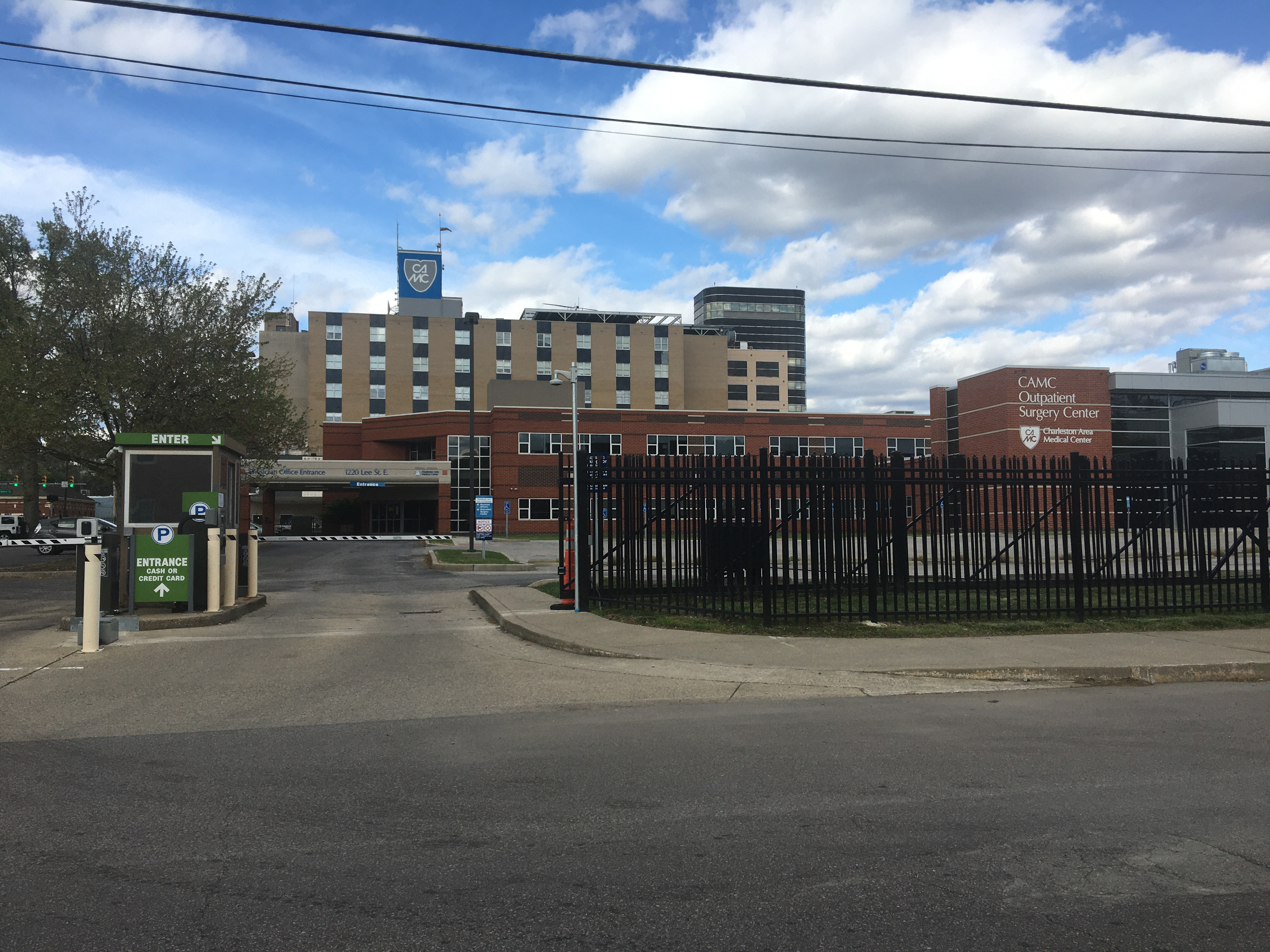
The present site of former Charleston High School

During the demolition of the school building, the entry door arches that were located on the Lee Street side were preserved and moved to the campus of the new Capital High School. The last city-wide graduating class, before Stonewall Jackson High opened to ease crowding, erected the memorial.

== Awards ==
During Charleston High's time, the school participated in the Gazette-Mail Kanawha County Majorette and Band Festival (then known as the Daily Mail). The school won the festival grand championship once in 1979 and has had seven majorettes named Miss Kanawha Majorette.

- 1981-Kelly Ellis
- 1979-Michelle Noe
- 1972-Bobbie Coleman
- 1970-Kay Bennet
- 1969-Kathy Wingo
- 1955-Judy Thrall
- 1948-Phyllis Walker

== Notable alumni ==
- Hot Rod Hundley (Class of 1953) – First overall pick in the 1957 NBA draft, two-time NBA All-Star, and consensus first-team All-American at West Virginia University (1957)
