= Shady Spring High School =

High school in Shady Springs, West Virginia

Coordinates: 37.70201°N 81.09236°W

Location
- 300 Hinton Rd. Shady Spring, West Virginia 25918

Information
- School type: Public secondary school
- School board: Raleigh County Schools
- Principal: Kari Vicars
- Teaching staff: 48.00 (FTE)
- Grades: 9-12
- Enrollment: 786 (2023-2024)
- Colors: Blue and Gold
- Mascot: Tigers
- Website: https://sshs.rale.k12.wv.us

Shady Spring High School is a high school in Shady Spring, West Virginia, which is a suburb of Beckley, West Virginia, including the gated community of Glade Springs, West Virginia. It is managed by the Raleigh County School District.

The school has 814 students, placing it in class "AAA”for sports purposes in the state. The colors are navy blue and old gold, and the mascot is the "Tigers", although the girls' teams have sometimes used "Lady Tigers" as well.

== Sports ==
Shady Spring High School has numerous sports teams including baseball, softball, soccer, football, golf, cross country, track and field, cheerleading, dance team, archery, tennis, volleyball and wrestling. Several have won state team championships including: Cross Country- 1 State Championship team and 2 state runner-up teams Golf- 3 State Championship teams, 1 state runner-up team and one individual state champion Volleyball - 6 State Championship teams and 5 State runner-up teams Boys Basketball - 2 State Championship team and 3 state runner-up team Girls Basketball - 1 State Championship team Wrestling - 5 State Championship Teams, 2 State runner-up teams, 33 individual state champions, 36 individual state runner-ups, 206 state top 6 place finishers, 4 National Wrestling Hall of Fame inductees Baseball - 2 State runner-up teams Softball - 6 State championship teams

== Notable alumni ==
- Steven C. Johnson (born 1960), Maryland state delegate
