= Sissonville High School =

Location
- 6100 Sissonville Drive; Sissonville, WV 25312; United States; 38°28′31″N 81°40′21″W

Information
- School type: Public, high school
- Motto: “Scholarship, Honor, Service”
- Established: 1932
- School board: KCS Board website
- School district: Kanawha County Schools
- CEEB code: 491195
- Principal: Robert “Gene” Smith
- Faculty: 51
- Teaching staff: 38.00 (FTE)
- Grades: 9 to 12
- Gender: coed
- Enrollment: 572 (2023–2024)
- Average class size: 22
- Student to teacher ratio: 15.05
- Schedule: 8:20am to 3:30pm
- Colors: Red; Black
- Fight song: “We’re Sissonville High School”
- Sports: Football, Basketball, Baseball, Soccer, Softball, Volleyball, Tennis, Golf, Track, Cross Country, Wrestling, and cheerleading
- Mascot: Indians
- Rival: Poca High School (all sports), Herbert Hoover High School (football), and Nitro High School (basketball)
- Website: School website

Sissonville High School is a public high school in Sissonville, West Virginia, USA. It is one of the eight public high schools in the Kanawha County School district. It serves students in grades 9 through 12.

== History ==
In October 2001, the Katie Sierra free speech case made national news when she was suspended for her activism in opposition to the bombing of Afghanistan.

== Arts ==
=== Band ===
The Sissonville High School Band program is under the direction of Corey Green, and consists of 3 major ensembles; "The Pride of Sissonville" Marching Band, Concert Band, and Jazz Band.

"The Pride" has won many awards at the local, regional, and national levels, with high placements at both the Tournament of Bands Atlantic Coast Championships and Cavalcade of Bands Finals. They were the 2014 (87.40) and 2015 (92.25) Cavalcade of Bands National Champions for the Independence A division.

The band participates in the annual Gazette-Mail Kanawha County Majorette and Band Festival as well as other local parades and exhibitions.

=== Touch of Class Show Choir ===
The Touch of Class Show Choir has won many awards throughout the years including: Best Male Soloist, Best Female Soloist, Class C Champion, and Grand Champions.

Touch of Class has had many themes for their main show, some notable themes include: Live in Living Color, The Game of Life, The Money Show, The Party Show, Light the Fire Within, Celebrating Music, and A Day In The Life.

In 2011, Sissonville High School's auditorium was completely redone, and new equipment was added as old was replaced. Lots of show choir shows, performances, prom fashion shows, talent shows, and theater productions were performed on that very stage.

== Athletics ==
- Baseball
- Basketball
- Cheerleading
- Football
- Golf
- Soccer
- Softball
- Tennis
- Track
- Cross Country
- Volleyball
- Boys Volleyball
- Wrestling
- Swimming
- Robotics
- Marching band

== See also ==
- List of high schools in West Virginia
