= Robert Alexander (American football) =

American football player (1958–2022)

No. 35, 31
- Position: Running back

Personal information
- Born: April 21, 1958; Charleston, West Virginia, U.S.
- Died: June 7, 2022 (aged 64); St. Albans, West Virginia, U.S.
- Listed height: 6 ft 0 in (1.83 m)
- Listed weight: 185 lb (84 kg)

Career information
- High school: South Charleston (South Charleston, West Virginia)
- College: West Virginia
- NFL draft: 1981: 10th round, 269th overall pick

Career history
- Los Angeles Rams (1981–1983); San Diego Chargers (1984)*; Los Angeles Express (1985)
- * Offseason or practice squad member only

Career NFL statistics
- Rushing yards: 31
- Rushing average: 3.9
- Receptions: 2
- Receiving yards: 3
- Stats at Pro Football Reference

Robert Alan Alexander (April 21, 1958 – June 7, 2022) was an American professional football running back who played collegiately for the West Virginia Mountaineers.

== College career ==
Alexander's career began at South Charleston High School, where he was the high school football national player of the year his senior season as picked by Parade Magazine. He then attended West Virginia over USC, Penn State, Ohio State and Maryland. On his freshman campaign, Alexander shared backup time with Walter Easley, behind starting back Dave Riley. Alexander rushed for 426 yards and a touchdown his freshman year.

Alexander shared starting time his sophomore year with Dane Conwell, a freshman, in 1978. Alexander, although sharing carries, rushed for 310 yards, third on the team.

In 1979, Alexander's junior season, he finally became the full starter of the Mountaineers' squad. Alexander rushed for 656 yards and two scores that season, which was the best of his career.

Alexander's best season came in 1980, his final year. Alexander rushed for a career-high and team-high 1,064 yards along with 5 touchdowns that season. At the time, the 4th most yards in a single season in Mountaineer history. At the time he left WVU Alexander ranked 2nd on the schools career rushing yards list.

Alexander is currently ranked 10th on the Mountaineers' all-time rushing yardage list with a career total of 2,474 yards rushing.

== Professional career ==
Alexander was drafted in the tenth round of the 1981 NFL draft by the Los Angeles Rams and played for them for two seasons.

== Death ==
On June 7, 2022, Alexander was found dead in his St. Albans, West Virginia, home. There were no signs of foul play.
