= Doug Legursky =

American football player (born 1986)

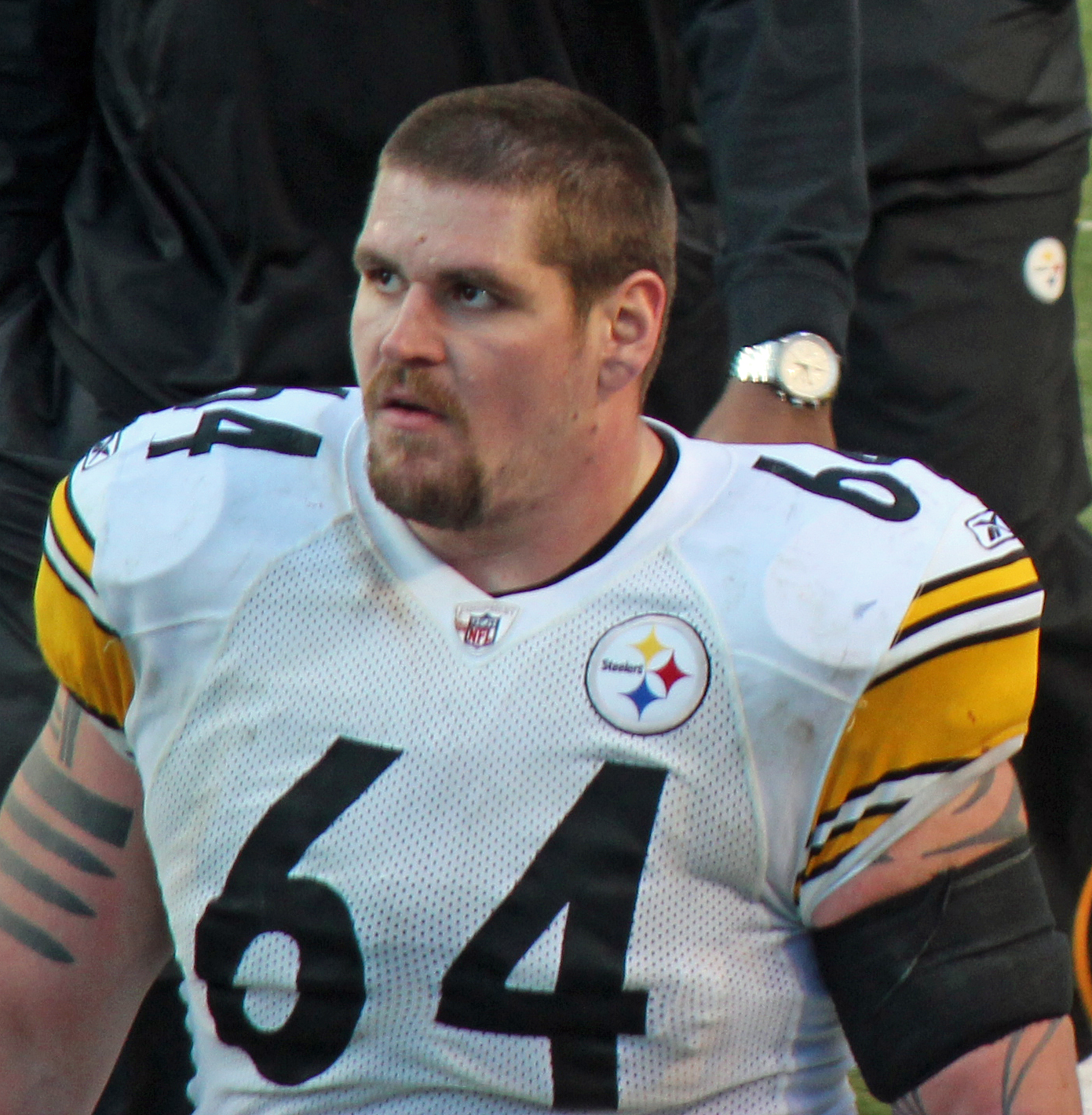
- Legursky with the Pittsburgh Steelers in 2012

No. 64, 59, 57
- Position: Center

Personal information
- Born: June 9, 1986 (age 40); Frankfurt, West Germany
- Listed height: 6 ft 1 in (1.85 m)
- Listed weight: 315 lb (143 kg)

Career information
- High school: Woodrow Wilson (Beckley, West Virginia, U.S.)
- College: Marshall (2004–2007)
- NFL draft: 2008: undrafted

Career history
- Pittsburgh Steelers (2008−2012); Buffalo Bills (2013); San Diego Chargers (2014); Pittsburgh Steelers (2015)

Awards and highlights
- Super Bowl champion (XLIII); 3× All-Conference USA (2005–2007)

Career NFL statistics
- Games played: 75
- Games started: 30
- Stats at Pro Football Reference

Wayne Douglas Legursky II (born June 9, 1986) is an American former professional football player who was a center in the National Football League (NFL). He was signed by the Steelers as an undrafted free agent in 2008. He played college football for the Marshall Thundering Herd.

Legursky also played for the Buffalo Bills and San Diego Chargers.

== Early life ==
He played at Woodrow Wilson High School in Beckley, West Virginia. The 2003 Hunt Award Winner as the best lineman in the state of West Virginia, was awarded to Legursky. On September 4, 2009, Legursky was inducted to the Woodrow Wilson Football Hall Of Fame.

== College career ==
He set two Marshall weight room records for the squat (705 lbs.) and the hang clean (430 lbs.) as a three-year starter at Marshall.

== Professional career ==
=== Pittsburgh Steelers (first stint) ===
Legursky signed with the Pittsburgh Steelers as an undrafted free agent on April 28, 2008. He was released on June 28 but re-signed the following day. Legursky was released by the team during final cuts on August 30, but re-signed to the team's practice squad on October 1 after guard Kendall Simmons was placed on injured reserve.

Legursky replaced Pouncey during the Steelers's 24-19 AFC Championship Game win on January 23, 2011. Legursky started his very first game at center in Super Bowl XLV due to Pro Bowl rookie Maurkice Pouncey's ankle injury. Although Legursky fumbled a snap to quarterback Ben Roethlisberger on the goal line resulting in a Jets safety, he helped RB Rashard Mendenhall run for a playoff career-high 121 yards and one touchdown. The Steelers lost to the Green Bay Packers 31–25 in Super Bowl XLV. After not being re-signed by the Steelers after the 2010–2011 season, Legursky became an unrestricted free agent.

=== Buffalo Bills ===
On June 5, 2013, Legursky signed with the Buffalo Bills.

=== San Diego Chargers ===
On September 11, 2014, Legursky signed with the San Diego Chargers. He replaced Nick Hardwick, who had been injured and out for the rest of the season.

=== Pittsburgh Steelers (second stint) ===
On August 25, 2015, it was announced that the Steelers had re-signed Legursky. He was released on September 5, 2015 but re-signed the next day after Maurkice Pouncey was placed on injured reserve.
