= Sissonville, West Virginia =

Census-designated place in Kanawha county West Virginia, United States

- Census-designated place (CDP)
- Location in Kanawha County and state of West Virginia.
- Coordinates: 38°30′17″N 81°38′43″W
- Country: United States
- State: West Virginia
- County: Kanawha

Area
  - Total: 12.8 sq mi (33.2 km^{2})
  - Land: 12.7 sq mi (33.0 km^{2})
  - Water: 0.077 sq mi (0.2 km^{2})
- Elevation: 620 ft (190 m)

Population (2020)
  - Total: 4,084
  - Density: 321/sq mi (124/km^{2})
- Time zone: UTC-5 (Eastern (EST))
  - Summer (DST): UTC-4 (EDT)
- ZIP codes: 25312, 25320, 25360
- Area code: 304
- FIPS code: 54-74356
- GNIS feature ID: 1546843

Sissonville is a census-designated place (CDP) in Kanawha County, West Virginia, United States, along the Pocatalico River. The population was 4,084 at the 2020 census (slightly up from 4,028 at the 2010 census). Sissonville is located within 14 miles of Charleston, the state capital.

== History ==
Sissonville is located in Kanawha County, West Virginia. It was named after an early settler by the name of John Sisson. History shows the first known settler north of Fort Lee (now known as Charleston) was a man named Johnson who built a log cabin near the mouth of Tuppers Creek in 1802 and later built a grist mill in the area. The community was named for John Sisson, who owned the original townsite.

The Sissonville area also includes the areas known as Cicerone, Pocatalico, Millertown, and Guthrie. There are numerous other smaller communities within these including Kanawha Two Mile, Derrick's Creek, Second Creek, Allen's Fork, and Kelly's Creek. The community runs from the city limits of Charleston on the southern end, North to the Jackson County line, East to Roane County, and West to Putnam County. The area covered by the Sissonville Volunteer Fire Department is just over 125 square miles. The fire department was founded in May 1961.

The Sissonville community has an extensive history of experiencing problems with flooding. The community suffered three National Disaster floods in 1998, 1999, and 2000. The flooding in 2000 claimed three lives when a boat belonging to the Charleston Fire Department capsized during a rescue attempt in the 2900 Block of Sissonville Drive. The history of flooding in the area was the impetus for the closing of Bonham Elementary School located along Kanawha Two Mile.

In October 2001, the Katie Sierra free speech case made national news when a Sissonville High School student was reportedly suspended for her activism in opposition to the bombing of Afghanistan. She was actually suspended for distributing flyers for a club against school policy without prior authorization.

On December 11, 2012, at 12:41 p.m. a 26-inch natural gas pipeline belonging to Columbia Gas Transmission exploded near the intersection of Route 21 and Derricks Creek Road. The resulting explosion and fire destroyed several homes and a wall of flame destroyed an over 800-foot long section of Interstate 77 just south of the Sissonville Exit, Exit 114. Firefighters had to rescue one occupant who had taken shelter behind her home. Despite the massive destruction, no serious injuries were reported and there was no loss of life.

== Geography ==
Sissonville is located at 38°30′17″N 81°38′43″W (38.504844, -81.645217). According to the United States Census Bureau, the Sissonville CDP has a total area of 12.8 square miles (33 km^{2}), of which 12.8 square miles (33 km^{2}) is land, and 0.1 square miles (0.26 km^{2}) is water.

Many people erroneously believe "Sissonville" encompasses all of the area north of the City of Charleston along State Route 21 and Interstate 77, but the area comprises four communities: Guthrie, Pocatalico, Millertown, and Sissonville.

== Demographics ==
Historical population
Census	Pop.	Note	%±
2000	4,399		—
2010	4,028		−8.4%
2020	4,084		1.4%
U.S. Decennial Census

As of the census of 2000, there were 4,399 people, 1,732 households, and 1,316 families residing in Sissonville. The population density was 345.1 people per square mile (133.2 people/km^{2}). There were 1,862 housing units at an average density of 146.1 units per square mile (56.4 units/km^{2}). The racial makeup of the CDP was 98.41% White, 0.48% African American, 0.14% Native American, 0.02% Asian, 0.36% from other races, and 0.59% from two or more races. Hispanic or Latino of any race were 0.52% of the population.

There were 1,732 households, out of which 32.5% had children under the age of 18 living with them, 60.0% were married couples living together, 11.5% had a female householder with no husband present, and 24.0% were non-families. 21.0% of all households were made up of individuals, and 8.8% had someone living alone who was 65 years of age or older. The average household size was 2.48 and the average family size was 2.84.

The age distribution is: 22.2% under the age of 18, 8.3% from 18 to 24, 29.1% from 25 to 44, 25.3% from 45 to 64, and 15.1% who were 65 years of age or older. The median age was 40 years. For every 100 females, there were 93.4 males. For every 100 females age 18 and over, there were 91.0 males.

The median income for a Sissonville household is $36,725, and the median income for a family was $46,420. Males had a median income of $35,408 versus $20,865 for females. The per capita income for the CDP was $19,657. About 8.6% of families and 10.3% of the population were below the poverty line, including 13.4% of those under age 18 and 8.1% of those age 65 or over.

== Economy ==
The largest employer in the Sissonville area is the Nippon Tokushu Tōgyō (Niterra in English) North America Manufacturing facility located near the Sissonville-Pocatalico Exit of Interstate 77. The facility employs over 400 full-time workers manufacturing spark plugs and oxygen sensors.

There are two natural gas compressor stations located in the Sissonville area. Columbia Gas operates the Lanham Compressor Station located at the intersection of Kelly's Creek Road and Martin's Branch; their pipeline is known for experiencing an explosion in December 2012. Cabot Oil & Gas operates the other compressor station located on Derrick's Creek Road near Edgewood Country Club.

The West Virginia Department of Agriculture's Gus R. Douglass Agricultural Center is located on Gus R. Douglas Lane off Guthrie Rd / Fishers Branch Rd in the Guthrie area of the community. The facility houses animal health labs and one of the Department's Regional Response Teams for dealing with agricultural emergencies.

== Education ==
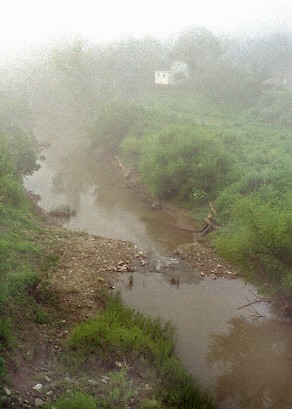
The Pocatalico River at Sissonville on a foggy morning

The area is served with two elementary schools: Sissonville Elementary and the Virgil L. Flinn Elementary School;, one middle school, Sissonville Middle School; and Sissonville High School.

There is a branch of the Kanawha County Public Library in the Pocatalico community.

The Sissonville Volunteer Fire Department has hosted an annual Fire & Rescue School since 2007. The school is designed to provide practical, hands-on training to first responders in all phases of emergency response. The event has grown into the largest public safety training event in the State of West Virginia having trained just over 800 first responders from nine states during the 2014 school.

== Notable people ==
- David A. Faber - is a United States federal judge on Senior Status and a graduate of Sissonville High School (1960).
- Toby Harrah - Baseball player, manager, etc.
- Steve Harrison - former member of West Virginia State Senate (2003–2006) and West Virginia House of Delegates (1993–2002).
- Darrell Holmes - Clerk of the State Senate (1989–present), former member of West Virginia State Senate (1983–1989) and West Virginia House of Delegates (1975–1982).
- Charlotte Pritt - former Chair of the Mountain Party, Democratic nominee for Governor (1996), former member of the West Virginia State Senate (1989–1992) and West Virginia House of Delegates (1985–1988).
- Walton Shepherd - former member of West Virginia House of Delegates (1975–1982, 1985–1986, 1990).
- Thomas K. Johnson - founding member of the Sissonville - Millertown - Pocatalico & Guthrie Volunteer Fire Department. Served with the department from its founding in May 1961 to December 31, 2012. Served over 35 years as the Chief of the department. The fire department's main fire station is named for him.
