= John Harriman House =

Historic house in West Virginia, United States

- U.S. National Register of Historic Places
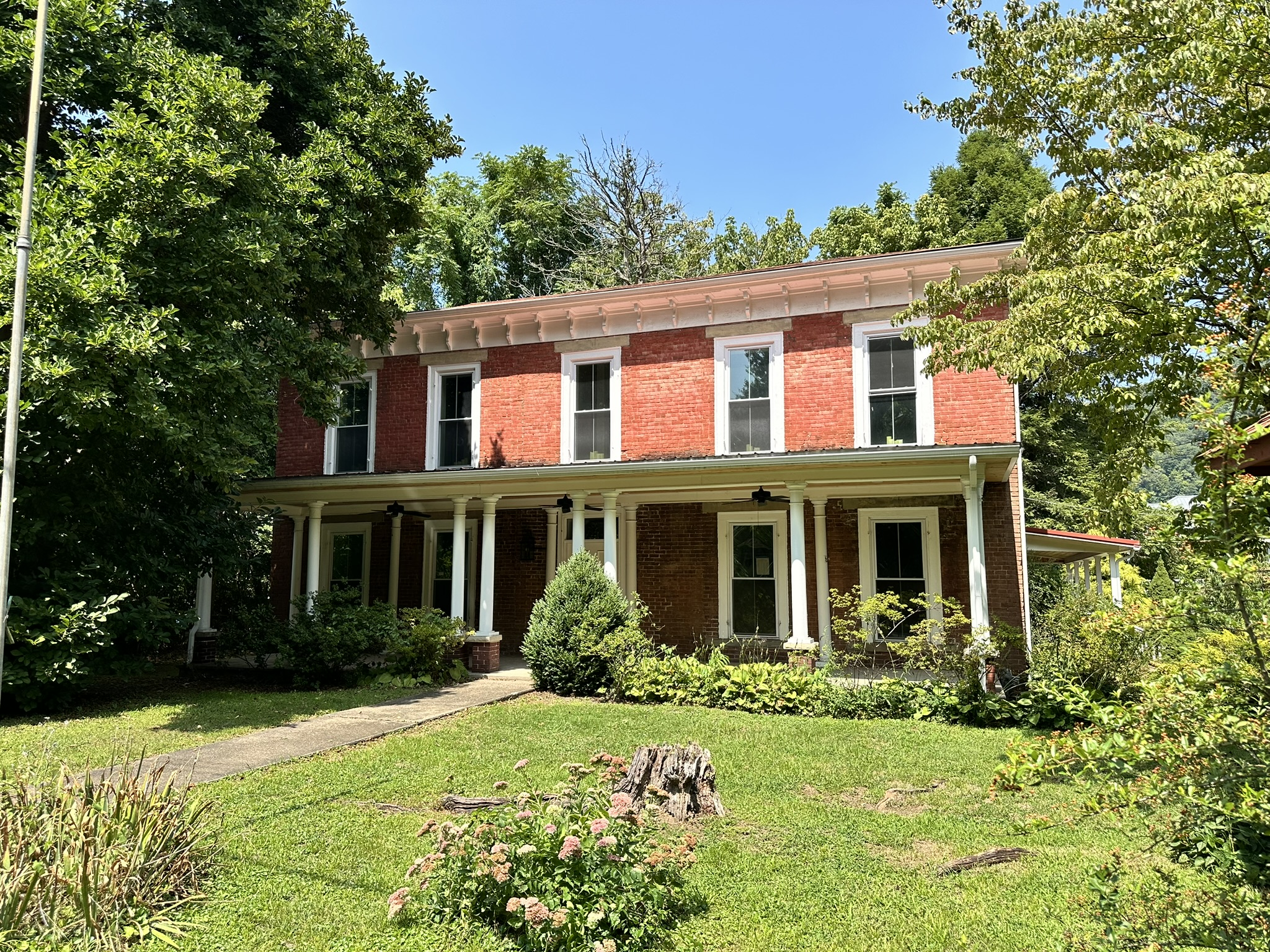

- Location within West Virginia Location within the United States
- Location: 2233 3rd Avenue, East Bank, West Virginia
- Coordinates: 38°13′0″N 81°26′27″W
- Area: 0.5 acres (0.20 ha)
- Built: c. 1826
- Built by: John Harriman
- NRHP reference No.: 78002803
- Added to NRHP: December 15, 1978

The John Harriman House is a historic home located at East Bank, Kanawha County, West Virginia, United States. It was built about 1826, and is a two-story rectangular brick dwelling with a projecting ell. It features a five-bay front porch with deep cornice supported by eight Doric order columns.

It was listed on the National Register of Historic Places in 1978.
