= Capital High School (Charleston, West Virginia) =

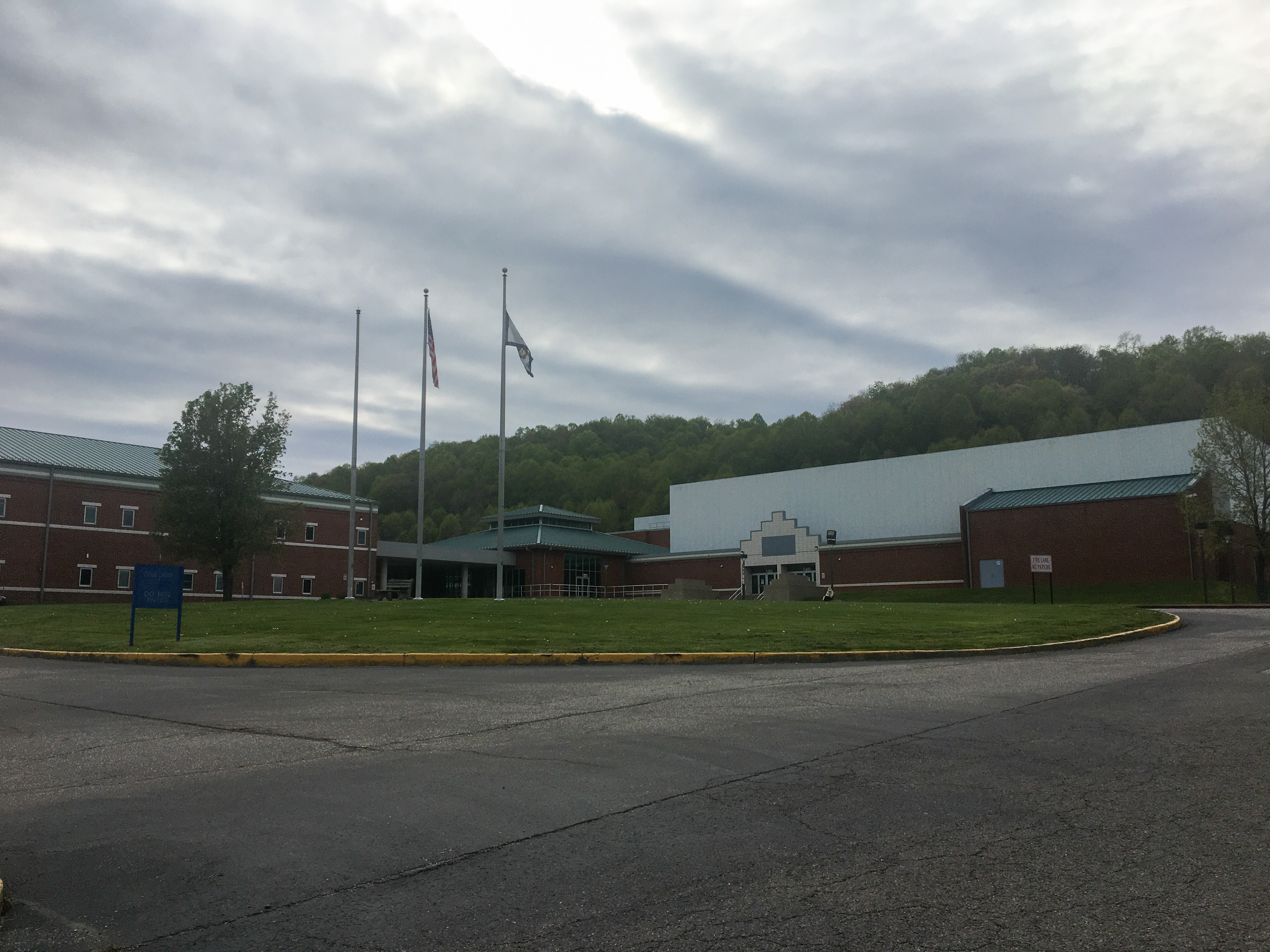

Location
- 1500 Greenbrier Street; Charleston, West Virginia 25311; United States
- 38.3720°N 81.5768°W

Information
- Type: Public secondary school
- Established: 1989
- School district: Kanawha County Schools
- Teaching staff: 75.17 (FTE)
- Grades: 9 to 12
- Enrollment: 1,042 (2023-2024)
- Student to teacher ratio: 13.86
- Colors: Royal blue and silver grey
- Nickname: Cougars
- Website: https://chs.kana.k12.wv.us/

Capital High School is a public high school located in Charleston, West Virginia, United States created from a consolidation of Charleston High School and Stonewall Jackson High School in 1989.

== History ==
The original high school in the city was Charleston High School, locally known as "The High," serving the entire city. In 1940 the school had become overcrowded and the district was divided at the Elk River, with the west side of town attending the new Stonewall Jackson High School ("The Wall"). During the 1980s, enrollment at both schools dropped. In 1989, Capital High School opened, combining the students of these two longtime rivals. The name "Capital" derives from the fact that the school primarily serves the bulk of West Virginia's capital city, Charleston.

The first site considered was near Laidley Field, next to the West Virginia State Capitol. This was abandoned in favor of a Track and Field Hall of Fame (which was never built) and a second site was selected on Greenbrier Street near the airport. However, when an airplane crashed on this site, it was abandoned, and today is an office park. The board then decided on a location on a hilltop about five miles from town that was formerly a country club for golfing and had a swimming pool. Although located in a rural setting, it is typically considered an inner-city school as the majority of its students come from an inner-city environment. This system of busing from an urban location to a closed campus in a remote setting was successful in controlling many urban problems and was later copied by Huntington High School

== Achievements ==
Academic

- State Science Bowl champions in 2006 and 2008.
- S.C.O.R.E.S, a competition involving subjects ranging from basic academic subjects to physical conditioning, champions in 2005, 2006, 2007, and 2008.
- First place winners of the Marshall Math Examination in 2007, a three-hour exam using extended reasoning and critical thinking.
- First place state Quiz bowl team in 2008.
- First place local ACS (American Chemical Society) Competition winners in 2008.
- 2015 West Virginia Quiz Bowl Champions

Athletic

- 1989, 1991, 1995 & 2014 Class AAA Football State Champions
- 1992, 1998 & 2003 Boys' Soccer State Champions
- 2000 & 2001 Boys' Basketball State Champions
- 2001 & 2002 Girls' Basketball State Champions
- 2001 Volleyball State Champion
- 1991,1992, 2000 & 2002 Boys' Track & Field State Champions
- 1991, 2000, 2003 & 2004 Girls' Track & Field State Champions
- 2015 Boys' Lacrosse - West Virginia Scholastic Lacrosse Association Champions

== Phantom of the Opera production ==
In 2007, Capital High was chosen by Rodgers and Hammerstein Theatricals as one of six pilot schools to perform The Phantom of the Opera.

== Performing arts ==
Capital High was Kanawha County's magnet school for the performing arts, offering a class in performing arts every period of the day. These include The Capital High Dance Company, the Capital High Theatre Department, the Capital High V.I.P.s (Voices In Perfection) Show Choir, the Capital High Orchestra, and "The Pride of Capital High" Marching and Concert Band as well as the Capital High School Jazz Ensemble. Each group has won numerous awards throughout the state of West Virginia, as well as outside of the state.

In 2015, the Capital High School Theatre Department won Outstanding Technical School and Outstanding Technical Theatre student at the West Virginia State Thespian Festival.

The Capital High Dance Company, accompanied by the Capital High Jazz Band, was selected to perform at "Arts Alive: The Best of West Virginia," held on April 28, 2008 at the Maier Foundation Performance Hall at the Clay Center for the Arts and Sciences. The Capital High Dance Company has also performed at the WV Dance Festival, the WV Secondary Dance Alliance Weekend Celebration, SCORES, and for Festival 2009.

The Capital High V.I.P.s (Voices In Perfection) Show Choir have won numerous grand championships and awards since the school's opening in 1989.

The Capital High Orchestra, combined with the South Charleston High School Orchestra, took First Place High School Orchestra and Best Overall Orchestra at Music in the Parks competition.

"The Pride of Capital High" Marching Band won two Grand Championships in its first marching competition season. Since the school's opening, the Pride of Capital High has won over 70 Grand Championships. The Pride of Capital High, along with the seven other public high schools in Kanawha County, compete in the Gazette-Mail Kanawha County Majorette and Band Festival. 2007 marked the tenth win for the band at the festival and the Class of 2008 became the first in to win the festival every year (including when the school was grades 10 through 12). In 2008, the band won the festival again and became the first band since 1984 to have won the festival for five consecutive years. They broke this record in 2009 and continued a winning streak until 2015, an eleven consecutive win streak with an overall of eighteen wins (1989–90, 1993, 1995, 1997, 2002, 2004–14, 2016). The band has had five girls named Miss Kanawha Majorette at the festival (in 1991, 1999, 2002, 2009, 2014, 2017). In the 2006–2007 academic school year, The Pride of Capital High went undefeated with a 5-0 winning streak, the first time the band went undefeated. The band has also performed for numerous Governors of West Virginia, two Presidents and Vice Presidents of the United States, including former Vice President Al Gore and former Senator Hillary Clinton in 2008.

The Concert Band has received superior ratings at the Region IV High School Adjudications (which is also hosted by the school) since the school's opening in 1989. In 2010, the concert band served as the Honor Band for the West Virginia Music Educators Association All-State Conference festival held in Charleston that year.

The Jazz Band has won several awards. In 2008, the Jazz Band was the accompaniment for the Capital High Dance Company at Arts Alive: The Best of West Virginia. The Jazz Band is the first instrumental group formed for Capital High in the spring of 1989, before the school opened. It consisted of musicians from Charleston High School and Stonewall Jackson High School.

Every year, Capital High students have been selected, by audition, to be in one of several honors groups, including the West Virginia All-State Chorus, the West Virginia All-State Orchestra, the West Virginia All-State Band, the Kanawha County All-County Chorus, the Kanawha County All-County Orchestra, the Kanawha County All-County Band, the Kanawha County All-County Jazz Band, the WVU Honor Band, the WVU Honor Orchestra, the Virginia Tech Honor Band, and other honors groups throughout West Virginia.

== Sports ==
Capital High offers a number of sports throughout fall, winter, and spring.

Fall sports

- Cheer
- Cross country
- Football
- Golf
- Boys' soccer
- Girls' soccer
- Volleyball

Winter sports

- Boys' basketball
- Girls' basketball
- Swimming
- Wrestling

Spring sports

- Baseball
- Boys' Lacrosse
- Girls' Lacrosse
- Softball
- Tennis
- Track & field
- Ice Hockey
- HALO
- Esports

== Notable alumni ==
- Dorian Etheridge, linebacker for the Atlanta Falcons
- Robert "RJ" Haddy, special effects artist; former teacher of Capital High; finalist on season 2 of Syfy's reality television game show Face Off; has worked on movies, including Batman & Robin; returned as a veteran contestant on season 5 of Face Off
- Darrion Scott, defensive end for the Washington Redskins

== 2008 presidential campaign ==
On Wednesday, March 19, 2008, then New York Senator Hillary Clinton selected Capital as her first high school to visit. The school received national recognition and was featured by several major national news networks and on the AOL.com homepage.

== Sources ==
- Capital High School website
- Greatschools
- City-Data.com
- National Center for Education Statistics, U.S. Dept. of Education
