= Independence High School (West Virginia) =

Coordinates: 37°41′47″N 81°13′24″W

Location
- 850 Independence Rd; Coal City, West Virginia 25823

Information
- School type: Public secondary school
- Established: 1976
- School district: Raleigh County Schools
- NCES School ID: 540123000958
- Principal: Mallory Green
- Teaching staff: 37.00 (FTE)
- Grades: 9-12
- Enrollment: 592 (2023-2024)
- Campus type: rural
- Colors: Red, white and blue
- Mascot: Patriot
- Website: https://ihs.rale.k12.wv.us

Independence High School is a consolidated high school in rural Raleigh County, West Virginia, located in the town of Coal City, West Virginia. The names of Independence and its sister school and rival Liberty High School reflect the fact they were both built in 1976, the U.S. Bicentennial. Independence consolidated the former Stoco and Sophia high schools and currently has over 500 students. The school nickname is Patriots and its colors are red, white, and blue.

Independence has received the Jennings Randolph Award several times. The award is given annually by the Secretary of State of West Virginia to dozens of high schools in the state that have registered 85 to 100 percent of eligible members of their senior class to vote.

Independence High is home to six wrestling state championships, those being in 1996, 2014, 2015, 2016, 2017, and 2018. The Patriots also claiming one baseball state championship in 1990, and a state football championship in 2022.
