= Woodrow Wilson High School (Beckley, West Virginia) =

Coordinates: 37.7987°N 81.16429°W

Location
- 400 Stanaford Rd; Beckley, West Virginia 25801

Information
- School type: Public secondary school
- Founded: 1925
- Status: Open
- School district: Raleigh County Schools
- NCES District ID: 5401230
- NCES School ID: 540123000991
- Principal: Ryan Stafford
- Faculty: 73.00 (FTE)
- Grades: 9-12
- Enrollment: 1,324 (2021-2022)
- Campus type: urban
- Colors: Maroon, White
- Mascot: Flying Eagles
- State School ID: WV-7400000-74506
- State District ID: WV-7400000
- Phone: (304)256-4646
- Charter: No
- Website: https://wwhs.rale.k12.wv.us/o/wwh

Woodrow Wilson High School (also, just “Beckley”) is a high school in Beckley, West Virginia, teaching grades nine through twelve. It is one of four secondary schools in the Raleigh County Public School District. The school's colors are maroon and white, and the mascot is a Flying Eagle. The school's principal is Ryan Stafford. Feeder schools are Park Middle School and Beckley Stratton Middle School. In 1967, it moved from its original location to its current location at 400 Stanaford Road.

== History ==
Beckley High School, the first public high school in the city, opened in 1917 using the facilities of the former Beckley Institute on Park Avenue. It operated there for one year, until a new high school was built on South Kanawha Street - Beckley Graded and High School.

The Town District Board of Education made plans for a new building. Through the proceeds from a bond issue, a new structure was built and was occupied in December 1925. It was named for former President Woodrow Wilson, who died the previous year. Woodrow Wilson High School's new building was built on land adjacent to the former Beckley Institute on Park Avenue.

When the school moved to its current site, outside of main Beckley, the former site was converted into Park Junior High School (now Park Middle School). During the first year of operation at the new site (1967–68), a record number of 2,432 students attended WWHS.

== Notable alumni ==
- Rob Ashford — Broadway choreographer and Tony Award-winner
- Ed Evans — American politician
- Cathy Leigh Comer Justice — First Lady of West Virginia
- Jim Justice — coal baron, owner of The Greenbrier resort and 36th Governor of West Virginia
- Doug Legursky — former NFL player
- Jon McBride — US astronaut
- Stephen M. Pachuta — retired United States Navy admiral
- Nick Rahall — former United States congressman
- Mark Carman — Music Producer
- Morgan Spurlock (1970-2024) — filmmaker, actor
- Tamar Slay — former NBA player for the New Jersey Nets and Charlotte Bobcats
- Hulett C. Smith — 27th Governor of West Virginia
- Gayle Conelly Manchin — American educator, politician, former First Lady of West Virginia from 2005 to 2010
- Chris Sarandon — Academy Award nominated actor
- Ted Cook — NBL player for Hammond Calumet Buccaneers
