= George Washington High School (Charleston, West Virginia) =

Coordinates: 38.33442°N 81.65661°W

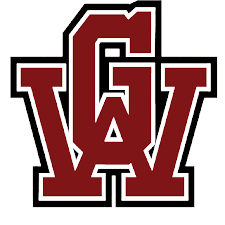

Location
- 1522 Tennis Club Road; Charleston, West Virginia 25314

Information
- Type: Free public
- Established: 1964
- School district: Kanawha County Schools
- Principal: Jim Crawford, Jr.
- Teaching staff: 51.00 (FTE)
- Grades: 9–12
- Student to teacher ratio: 22.45
- Campus size: 23 acres (93,000 m^{2})
- Campus type: Suburban
- Colors: Burgundy and White
- Athletics conference: Mountain State Athletic Conference
- Nickname: Patriots
- Website: https://gwhs.kana.k12.wv.us/

George Washington High School is a public high school in Charleston, West Virginia, United States.

The school was nicknamed "The Hill", as it is located in the South Hills neighborhood, and has been referred to as "GW" dating back at least to the 1970s and “GeeDub” more recently.

== District ==
The school serves the South Hills neighborhood of the city and several incorporated areas nearby. It is one of eight public high schools in Kanawha County.

== History ==
The school, which opened in 1965, based on a plan developed by local educators, members of the West Virginia Department of Education, and faculty from Ohio State University. The school's ideals of "self-direction", flexible scheduling and independent study, were intended to provide students with opportunities to direct themselves and to prepare them for college academic life. The high school's first graduating class (who attended high school entirely at school) included fifteen National Merit Scholar finalists.

In 1974, the school became involved in a notable textbook controversy, the so-called "Battle of the Books". In order to comply with a 1970 mandate to provide multicultural reading material, the board of education for Kanawha County took up a motion to purchase 300 different titles of new language arts textbooks. The titles included Soul on Ice by Eldridge Cleaver and The Autobiography of Malcolm X. After a public outcry, the board decided to not purchase the books, but community was still in turmoil. In September, students at George Washington High School began a 30-day walk out in protest of the removal of the books. By November the school voted that all but one of the books be returned to the schools.

During the 1983-84 school year, the United States Department of Education recognized the high school as a National School of Excellence in the President's Search for Excellence in Education.

The school made national headlines in 1992, when, during an illegal off-campus Senior Skip Day party with students from South Charleston High School, two students were fatally shot in an argument over payment for a keg of beer.

== Academics ==
The school's average SAT scores for Math and Verbal were 480 and 495, as of 2020. In 2005, it was the only high school in West Virginia to win a blue ribbon for excelling in No Child Left Behind requirements.

The school offers a wide array of Advanced Placement courses to students such as English Literature and Composition, English Language and Composition, Biology, Physics, Chemistry, Calculus, Statistics, Computer Science, US History, US Government and Politics, Art History, Music Theory, World History, and Spanish.

== Extracurricular and co-curricular activities ==
The school has many extra curricular and co-curricular activities, including baseball, softball, JROTC, football, volleyball, swimming, soccer, cross-country, golf, basketball, tennis, wrestling, lacrosse, track teams and cheerleading, many of which consistently compete for state championships.

The competitive cheer team not only participates in competitions, winning Regionals and MSACS in 2021 and placing 7th at Nationals after winning Game Day States in 2023, but also cheers at football and basketball games, showcasing their spirit year-round.

The school's marching band was the 2022 West Virginia Music Educators Association State Honor Band, an award held by the band every other year since 1992. The band has also won the Gazette-Mail Kanawha County Majorette and Band Festival Grand Championship numerous times (1986, 1991–92, 1994, 1996, 1998–2000, 2017-2022), and has had six girls named Miss Kanawha Majorette (in 1989, 2010, 2012, 2015, 2016, 2021,2023,2025).

Sports State Championships
| Sport | State Champion | Year | State Runner-Up | Year |
| Boys' Lacrosse | 1 | 2024 | 5 | 2015, 2016, 2017, 2018, 2023 |
| Girls' Lacrosse | 3 | 2015, 2018, 2026 | 3 | 2014, 2019, 2021 |
| Boys' Cross Country | 1 | 1991 | 1 | 1997 |
| Football | 1 | 1982 | 2 | 2008, 2011 |
| Golf | 4 | 1988, 1989, 2018, 2021 | 5 | 1973, 1983, 2001, 2014, 2020 |
| Volleyball | 7 | 1981, 1982, 2005, 2006, 2012, 2015, 2019 | 2 | 2016, 2020 |
| Boys' Soccer | 8 | 2007, 2011, 2013, 2016, 2018, 2019, 2020 2023 | 2 | 1993, 2014, |
| Girls' Soccer | 1 | 2021 | 6 | 1999, 2010, 2012, 2016, 2024, 2025 |
| Boys' Basketball | 5 | 1971, 2011, 2018, 2021, 2026 | 5 | 1993, 2001, 2006, 2012, 2025 |
| Girls' Basketball | 3 | 1978, 1979, 1980 | 1 | 1997 |
| Boys' Swimming | 10 | 2009, 2011, 2012, 2013, 2014, 2015, 2017, 2018, 2020, 2021 | 5 | 2001, 2010, 2016, 2019,2025 |
| Girls' Swimming | 9 | 2003, 2004, 2013, 2014, 2015, 2016, 2020, 2021, 2022 | 6 | 2005, 2006, 2008, 2009, 2010, 2012 |
| Baseball | 1 | 2026 | 2 | 2022, 2024 |
| Boys' Tennis | 21 | 1974, 1975, 1986, 1987, 1988, 1993, 1994, 1998, 1999, 2005, 2007, 2008, 2009, 2010, 2013, 2014, 2015, 2016, 2018, 2019, 2021 | 2 | 2011, 2022 |
| Girls' Tennis | 15 | 1969, 1978, 1979, 1980, 1988, 1989, 1990, 1992, 1993, 1994, 1999, 2006, 2007, 2018, 2024 | 1 | 2023 |
| Boys' Track | 1 | 1981 | 0 | |
| Girls' Track | 1 | 1980 | 0 | |

== Notable alumni ==
The school's noted alumni include:

- Shawn Clark, college football head coach, currently at Appalachian State
- Jennifer Garner, actress
- Danny Jones, former mayor of Charleston, West Virginia
- Conor Knighton, actor and television host
- Ann Magnuson, actress
- Ryan Switzer, is a former American football wide receiver and punt returner, who played at the National Football League (NFL)
- Sam Trammell, actor
- Anne White, former professional tennis player
- Bob Wise, former Governor of West Virginia
