= Riverside High School (West Virginia) =

Coordinates: 38.20737°N 81.51308°W

Location
- 1 Warrior Way; Belle, West Virginia; United States

Information
- Type: Public
- Established: 1999
- Principal: Stephen Loftis
- Teaching staff: 62.00 (FTE)
- Grades: 9th-12th Grades
- Enrollment: 1,126 (2023–2024)
- Student to teacher ratio: 18.16
- Colors: Purple; Black; Silver
- Mascot: Warrior
- Affiliations: Kanawha County Schools
- Website: https://riverside.kana.k12.wv.us/o/riverside

Riverside High School is the largest high school in Kanawha County, and is located in Belle, West Virginia, United States.

== History ==
The school opened in 1999 as a result of the consolidation of DuPont High School (AAA) and East Bank High School (AA). Students from both of those former high school areas, and from the Cedar Grove and Montgomery areas, attend the school. The school's attendance district runs from the Kanawha-Fayette county line to the Charleston city limits.

== Academics ==
Riverside High offers a wide variety of courses and electives for grades 9–12. Electives include AP Courses as well as Duel Enrollment College Courses.

== Athletics ==
Riverside High is a WVSSAC AAAA school. The school has had several successful sports teams in the 20+ years it has been in operation. Sports include wrestling, volleyball, track & field, softball, baseball, soccer, basketball, tennis, cross country, cheerleading, golf, and football.

== Marching Warriors "The Pride of Riverside" ==
The school has had two baton twirlers named Miss Kanawha Majorette at the Gazette-Mail Kanawha County Majorette and Band Festival. In 2016 the Warrior Band received a 1 at ratings. This is the highest score.

In 2025, the band won the Festival Grand Championship at the 78th Annual Gazette-Mail Festival. This was the first time since the merger of DuPont and East Bank that the school had won this honor, and they won it again in 2026.

== Facilities ==
The school premises have a full-service branch of the Kanawha County Public Library, a Pioneer Federal credit union, and facilities operated by Cabin Creek Health Center.

== 2019 expansion ==
On September 6, 2016, a special state committee voted to close Valley High School in nearby Fayette County and send some of its students to Riverside. Starting in August 2019, 135 Fayette County students choose to attend Riverside.

== Alumni ==
=== Dupont High School ===
- Randy Moss, Sports Analyst and Former NFL Wide Receiver
- Jason Williams, Former NBA Point Guard and NBA Champion
- Bobbie Howard, Former NFL Linebacker

=== East Bank High School ===
- Jerry West, Basketball executive, Former NBA player, NBA Logo Inspiration
