= Saint Albans High School (West Virginia) =

Location
- 2100 Kanawha Terrace; St. Albans, West Virginia; United States; 38.37913°N 81.81208°W

Information
- Type: Public
- Established: 1909
- School district: 12
- Principal: Jerrica Stingo
- Teaching staff: 52.00 (FTE)
- Grades: 9 to 12
- Enrollment: 900 (2023–2024)
- Student to teacher ratio: 17.31
- Colours: Red and black
- Mascot: Red Dragons
- Website: https://sahs.kana.k12.wv.us/

Saint Albans High School is a public high school in Kanawha County, West Virginia, United States. Founded in 1912, it is located in the city of St. Albans. It is one of the eight public high schools in Kanawha County Schools. SAHS opened a newly renovated facility for the 2004 school year.

== History ==
The school was founded in 1913 by Charles P. Guice and was then called Central Grade School, which was located on Sixth Avenue and Third Street in St Albans, WV. The class of 1916 were among the first graduates of the High School and after World War 1, student enrollment increased and a new building for the school was built. The new building was completed in 1924 and had multiple additions to add a gymnasium as well as more classrooms. In 1954, another new High School was completed and stood there until 2003. In the summer of 2000, the voters for the school bond gave 3 million dollars for the renovation of the High School. In 2003 the new building was completed where St Albans High School currently stands. The school reached peak enrollment in 1971 where over 1700 students where enrolled the school. In 1974, the largest class in history of St Albans High School graduated with 620 students.

== Awards ==
After the completion in 2003, the new St Albans High School was recognized for two awards. The School Planning and Management magazine awarded the school with one of the Impact on Learning awards for their outstanding renovations to the school. The second recognition came from American School and University which added the school to its Architectural Portfolio issue for the 2004 issue where it is one of 258 other facilities recognized.

== Academics Information ==
St Albans High School is one of eight schools in its Kanawha County district. The High School offers some AP classes and according to US news, the High School has an 80% graduation rate for the 2014–2015 school year. Total enrollment in the 2014–2015 school year was 1033 and 59 teachers taught at the school.

St. Albans High School competes in the Gazette-Mail Kanawha County Majorette and Band Festival. They have won the Festival Grand Championship three times (1972, 1973, and 1975).

== Notable alumni ==
Walter Hall, member of the West Virginia House of Delegates
