= South Charleston High School =

Coordinates: 38.34821°N 81.73521°W

Location
- 1 Eagle Way; South Charleston, WV 25309

Information
- Type: Public
- Motto: It's a great day to be a Black Eagle.
- Established: 1926 (consolidated in 1990)
- School district: Kanawha County Schools
- Principal: Ryan Carter
- Staff: 50.00 (FTE)
- Grades: 9-12
- Student to teacher ratio: 18.26
- Campus size: 65 acres (0.26 km^{2})
- Campus type: Suburban
- Colors: Black and orange
- Nickname: Black Eagles
- Website: https://schs.kana.k12.wv.us/

South Charleston High School is a public high school in West Virginia serving grades 9 through 12. It is located south of the Kanawha River, west of the city of Charleston, in the city of South Charleston's Spring Hill neighborhood.

The school mascot is the Black Eagle.

SCHS is a Class AAA school, which is the highest enrollment classification of high school sports in West Virginia.

The Black Eagles football team went 14-0 and won the 2008 Class AAA State title in a 39-8 win over George Washington High School on December 6, 2008.

== History ==
South Charleston High School has called three buildings home since it was created over 80 years ago. The original Louden District High School was built in downtown South Charleston in 1925. A newer building was built a few blocks from the old building, still in downtown South Charleston, in 1931. South Charleston High was moved to the larger building; South Charleston Junior High School moved into the 1925 building, from the old 1931 building, which was across the street from the "old rec center" at Oakes Field. It was pentagon shaped, 3 story. In 1971 a new, much larger school and campus complex was built on the former site of Southmoor Country Club in the Spring Hill area of town. South Charleston Junior High School was moved from the original 1925 building to the old South Charleston High School. The current South Charleston Middle School building today still has Louden District High School engraved into the stone.

The South Charleston High School "Black Eagle Band" has been around almost as long as the school. The original band was organized in 1932 with only three members participating. The first band was led by Charles Gorby, whose music store founded in 1946 in downtown South Charleston is somewhat of a local landmark. The band has seen enrollment of up to 110 members at one time.

In 1990, South Charleston's rival school Dunbar High School was closed and those students were transferred across the Kanawha River to South Charleston High School.

South Charleston High school, along with George Washington High School, made national headlines in 1992, when, during an illegal off-campus Senior Skip Day party with other students from South Charleston High School, two students were shot and killed over an argument about payment for a keg of beer.

In 1999, SCHS became the first school in West Virginia to offer the International Baccalaureate (IB) Program. SCHS is still the only high school in West Virginia to offer the IB program, more than ten years after it was introduced into the state.

== School renovations ==
South Charleston High School underwent several renovations, including the completion of a commons area, more classrooms and an auxiliary gym, to make room for ninth graders students in 2001 when the school changed from grades 10-12 to include freshman. A commons area referred to by the students and staff as the "Piazza" was added to the front of the school and became the current entrance to the building. It serves as a commons area and houses a concession stand, garden, and seating areas. The entrance to the gym, theater, auxiliary gym and offices can all be accessed from the commons area. The auxiliary gym was added to allow gym classes and sports practices at the same time. The new classrooms were added to the back of the school that now house the history department and are referred to as "The New Wing" by students and staff. The cafeteria was also made larger to make room for the upcoming students.

== Athletics ==
South Charleston has many athletic programs available to students. The football program won the State Championship in school years 1945-1946, 1994–1995, 2008–09 and 2009-10 for Class AAA. The school was also named State Runner-Up in the 2014-15 school year, after a loss to Capital High School in the AAA State Championship. In 2008, the Black Eagles capped a 14-0 season with a 39-8 rout of George Washington to win the Class AAA Football State Championship. After a 13-1 season, it also won the 2009-10 AAA State Championships against Brooke 28-7. The basketball team won the State Championship in the 1958-1959 school year, and has made numerous state tournament appearances. The baseball team won the state championship in 1976-1977, 1977–1978 and 2005-2006. The cheerleaders, tennis team, track team, swim team, softball team, and soccer team have all made their mark on West Virginia State high school athletics as well.

The football team played the first on-campus game on September 6, 2013. In the past, they did not play games on campus. Instead, they played at Oakes Field, built in the 1920s with a seating capacity of about 2,000 fans, in downtown South Charleston. The boys' basketball team previously played at the high school in the "Old Pro Gymnasium" named in honor of long-time Coach Marv "The Old Pro" Richardson. The gym holds around 1,000. The basketball teams now play at the South Charleston Recreational Center. The baseball field, softball field, tennis courts, and track are all on campus. The swim team practices at the South Charleston Community Center and the soccer team plays at Little Creek Park.

The Student Spirit Organization at the school heavily participates during football and basketball season. The students commonly wear all orange on game nights and sit in a student section referred to as "Orange Nation."

== Band ==
The South Charleston High School marching band is one of the eight public high schools that compete in the Gazette-Mail Kanawha County Majorette and Band Festival. Although they have never won the Festival Grand Championship, they have had the most girls named Miss Kanawha Majorette, the first girl to ever be named Miss Kanawha Majorette, and, currently, the only girl to be named Miss Kanawha Majorette twice.

== Notable alumni ==
- Robert Alexander - football player, Parade magazine High School Player of the Year; two-time high school All-American running back 1975-76; West Virginia University top 10 all-time rushing yards; five-year NFL career with Los Angeles Rams and San Diego Chargers
- Anthony Bass - NFL player
- Larry Combs - formerly principal clarinet of Chicago Symphony Orchestra, West Virginia Music Hall of Fame http://www.allmusic.com/artist/larry-combs-mn0000764117/biography
- Aaron Dobson - Class of 2009; former NFL wide receiver, drafted in second round by New England Patriots; played college football at Marshall University
- Gay Elmore - Class of 1982; two-time Southern Conference Men's Basketball Player of the Year for VMI
- Gary Gregor - Class of 1963; NBA All-Rookie Team 1969; one of the original Portland Trail Blazers; six-year NBA career with several teams; graduated 1968 from University of South Carolina
- Alex Hawkins - running back for University of South Carolina and for 1959 NFL champion Baltimore Colts; special-teams captain for Colts in Super Bowl III; CBS sportscaster and author of two books, That's My Story and I'm Sticking to It and Then Came Brain Damage: Life After Pro Football
- Alexis Hornbuckle - Class of 2004; four-year starter and member of 2007 national champion women's basketball team at University of Tennessee.; member of 2008 WNBA champion Detroit Shock
- Carl Lee - professional football player for Minnesota Vikings and New Orleans Saints.; cornerback at Marshall University; former head football coach at West Virginia State University
- Renee Montgomery - Class of 2005; 2009 first-team All-American point guard for undefeated University of Connecticut's women's basketball team; selected #4 in 2009 WNBA draft by Minnesota Lynx, 2-time WNBA champion
