= List of high schools in West Virginia =

This is a list of high schools in the U.S. state of West Virginia.

Locations are the communities in which they are located, with postal location in parentheses if different.

== Barbour County ==
- Philip Barbour High School, Philippi

== Berkeley County ==
- Hedgesville High School, Hedgesville
- Musselman High School, Inwood

=== Martinsburg ===
- Faith Christian Academy
- Martinsburg High School
- Spring Mills High School

== Boone County ==
- Scott High School, Madison
- Sherman High School, Seth
- Van Junior-Senior High School, Van

== Braxton County ==
- Braxton County High School, Sutton

== Brooke County ==
- Brooke High School, Wellsburg

== Cabell County ==
- Cabell Midland High School, Ona

=== Huntington ===
- Covenant School
- Grace Christian School
- Huntington High School
- Huntington Prep School
- St. Joseph Central Catholic High School

== Calhoun County ==
- Calhoun County Middle-High School, Mount Zion
- Calhoun-Gilmer Career Center, Grantsville

== Clay County ==
- Clay County High School, Clay

== Doddridge County ==
- Doddridge County High School, West Union

== Fayette County ==
- Meadow Bridge High School, Meadow Bridge
- Midland Trail High School, Hico

=== Oak Hill ===
- Fayette Institute of Technology
- Oak Hill High School

== Gilmer County ==
- Gilmer County High School, Glenville

== Grant County ==
- Union K-12 Educational Complex, Mount Storm

=== Petersburg ===
- Petersburg High School
- South Branch Vocational Center

== Greenbrier County ==
- Greenbrier East High School, Fairlea
- Greenbrier West High School, Charmco

== Hampshire County ==
=== Romney ===
- Hampshire County Career Center
- Hampshire High School
- West Virginia School for the Blind
- West Virginia School for the Deaf

== Hancock County ==
=== New Cumberland ===
- John D. Rockefeller Career Center
- Oak Glen High School

=== Weirton ===
- Weir High School
- Weirton Madonna High School

== Hardy County ==
- East Hardy High School, Baker
- Moorefield High School, Moorefield

== Harrison County ==
- Bridgeport High School, Bridgeport
- Lincoln High School, Shinnston
- South Harrison High School, Lost Creek

=== Clarksburg ===
- Notre Dame High School
- Robert C. Byrd High School
- Liberty High School
- United Technical Center

== Jackson County ==
- Ravenswood High School, Ravenswood
- Ripley High School, Ripley
- Roane-Jackson Technical Center, LeRoy

== Jefferson County ==
- Jefferson High School, Shenandoah Junction
- Washington High School, Charles Town

== Kanawha County ==
- Ben Franklin Career & Technical/Vocational Center, Dunbar
- Carver Career & Technical Education Center, Rand
- Elk Valley Christian School, Elkview
- Herbert Hoover High School, Falling Rock
- Nitro High School, Nitro
- Riverside High School, Quincy
- St. Albans High School, St. Albans
- Sissonville High School, Pocatalico
- South Charleston High School, South Charleston

=== Charleston ===
- Capital High School
- Chandler Academy Alternative School
- Charleston Catholic High School
- Cross Lanes Christian School
- Garnet Career Center
- George Washington High School

== Lewis County ==
- Lewis County High School, Weston

== Lincoln County ==
- Lincoln County High School, Hamlin

== Logan County ==
- Chapmanville Regional High School, Chapmanville
- Man High School, Man

=== Logan ===
- Logan High School
- Ralph R Willis Vocational Center

== Marion County ==
=== Fairmont ===
- East Fairmont High School
- Fairmont Senior High School

=== Farmington ===
- Marion County Technical Center
- North Marion High School

== Marshall County ==
- Cameron High School, Cameron
- John Marshall High School, Glen Dale

== Mason County ==
- Hannan High School, Ashton
- Wahama High School, Mason

=== Point Pleasant ===
- Mason County Vocational-Technical Center
- Point Pleasant High School

== McDowell County ==
- River View High School, Bradshaw

=== Welch ===
- McDowell County Career and Technology Center
- Mount View High School

== Mercer County ==
- Bluefield High School, Bluefield
- Montcalm High School, Montcalm
- PikeView High School, Athens

=== Princeton ===
- Mercer Christian Academy
- Princeton High School

== Mineral County ==
- Frankfort High School, Short Gap
- Keyser High School, Keyser

== Mingo County ==
- Mingo Central High School, Newtown
- Tug Valley High School, Naugatuck

== Monongalia County ==
- Clay-Battelle High School, Blacksville

=== Morgantown ===
- Morgantown High School
- Trinity Christian School
- University High School
- Monongalia County Technical Education Center
- Morgantown Christian Academy

== Monroe County ==
=== Lindside ===
- James Monroe High School
- Monroe County Vocational/Technical Center

== Morgan County ==
- Berkeley Springs High School, Berkeley Springs
- Paw Paw High School, Paw Paw

== Nicholas County ==
- Nicholas County Career and Technical Center, Craigsville
- Richwood High School, Richwood

=== Summersville ===
- New Life Christian Academy
- Nicholas County High School

== Ohio County ==
=== Wheeling ===
- Linsly School
- Wheeling Central Catholic High School
- Wheeling Park High School

== Pendleton County ==
- Pendleton County High School, Franklin

== Pleasants County ==
=== St. Marys ===
- Mid-Ohio Valley Technical Institute (serves Pleasants, Ritchie, Tyler, & Wetzel Counties)
- St. Marys High School

== Pocahontas County ==
- Pocahontas County High School, Dunmore

== Preston County ==
- Preston High School, Kingwood

== Putnam County ==
- Buffalo High School, Buffalo
- Hurricane High School, Hurricane
- Poca High School, Poca
- Teays Valley Christian School, Scott Depot
- Winfield High School, Winfield

== Raleigh County ==
- Greater Beckley Christian School, Prosperity
- Independence High School, Coal City
- Liberty High School, Glen Daniel
- Shady Spring High School, Shady Spring

=== Beckley ===
- Academy of Careers and Technology
- Woodrow Wilson High School

== Randolph County ==
- Harman High School, Harman
- Pickens K-12 School, Pickens
- Tygarts Valley High School, Mill Creek

=== Elkins ===
- Elkins High School
- Randolph Technical Center

== Ritchie County ==
=== Ellenboro ===
- The Highland School
- Ritchie County High School

== Roane County ==
- Roane County High School, Spencer

== Summers County ==
- Summers County High School, Hinton

== Taylor County ==
- Grafton High School, Grafton

== Tucker County ==
- Tucker County High School, Hambleton

== Tyler County ==
- Tyler Consolidated High School, Sistersville

== Upshur County ==
- Buckhannon-Upshur High School, Buckhannon
- Fred W. Eberle Technical Center

== Wayne County ==
- Spring Valley High School, Huntington
- Tolsia High School and Southern Vocational/Technology Center, Fort Gay
- Wayne High School, Wayne

== Webster County ==
- Webster County High School, Upperglade

== Wetzel County ==
- Hundred High School, Hundred
- Magnolia High School, New Martinsville
- Paden City High School, Paden City
- Valley High School, Pine Grove

== Wirt County ==
- Wirt County High School, Elizabeth

== Wood County ==
=== Parkersburg ===
- Parkersburg Catholic High School
- Parkersburg Christian School
- Parkersburg High School
- Parkersburg South High School

=== Williamstown ===
- Williamstown High School
- Wood County Christian School

== Wyoming County ==
- Westside High School, Clear Fork
- Wyoming East High School, New Richmond

== See also ==
- Education in West Virginia
- List of school districts in West Virginia
