= List of school districts in West Virginia =

This is a list of school districts in West Virginia, sorted in an alphabetical order.

All public school districts in the U.S. state of West Virginia, by law, exactly follow the county boundaries.

All school districts are independent governments. No public school systems are dependent on another layer of government.

== B ==
- Barbour County Schools
- Berkeley County Schools
- Boone County Schools
- Braxton County Schools
- Brooke County Schools

== C ==
- Cabell County Schools
- Calhoun County Schools
- Clay County Schools

== D ==
- Doddridge County Schools

== F ==
- Fayette County Schools

== G ==
- Gilmer County Schools
- Grant County Schools
- Greenbrier County Schools

== H ==
- Hampshire County Schools
- Hancock County Schools
- Hardy County Schools
- Harrison County Schools

== J ==
- Jackson County Schools
- Jefferson County Schools

== K ==
- Kanawha County Schools

== L ==
- Lewis County Schools
- Lincoln County Schools
- Logan County Schools

== M ==
- Marion County Schools
- Marshall County Schools
- Mason County Schools
- McDowell County Schools
- Mercer County Schools
- Mineral County Schools
- Mingo County Schools
- Monongalia County Schools
- Monroe County Schools
- Morgan County Schools

== N ==
- Nicholas County Schools

== O ==
- Ohio County Schools

== P ==
- Pendleton County Schools
- Pleasants County Schools
- Pocahontas County Schools
- Preston County Schools
- Putnam County Schools

== R ==
- Raleigh County Schools
- Randolph County Schools
- Ritchie County Schools
- Roane County Schools

== S ==
- Summers County Schools

== T ==
- Taylor County Schools
- Tucker County Schools
- Tyler County Schools

== U ==
- Upshur County Schools

== W ==
- Wayne County Schools
- Webster County Schools
- Wetzel County Schools
- Wirt County Schools
- Wood County Schools
- Wyoming County Schools

== See also ==
- List of high schools in West Virginia
