= Iaeger High School =

Coordinates: 37°27′44.3″N 81°49′6.9″W

- Iaeger, West Virginia

Information
- School type: High School
- Founded: 1918
- Closed: 2010
- School board: McDowell County Schools
- Grades: 9–12
- Language: English
- Colors: Old Gold and Royal Blue
- Mascot: Cub
- Team name: Cubs

Iaeger High School in Iaeger, West Virginia was a high school, part of McDowell County Schools. It offered a wide range of academic and athletic programs to students including some college-level and Advanced Placement (AP) classes along with various sports such as football, baseball, golf, softball, volleyball, and basketball. Iaeger High School closed after the school year ended in 2010 and merged with nearby Big Creek High School to form Riverview High School.

== Mascot and colors ==
Iaeger High School's colors were Old Gold and Royal Blue. Its mascot was the Cub.

== Notable alumni ==
- John Brewer, American football player

== See also ==
- McDowell County Schools
- List of high schools in West Virginia
- Education in West Virginia
