= Monroe County Schools =

Monroe County Schools may refer to:

- Monroe County Intermediate School District (Michigan)
- Monroe County Schools (Tennessee)
- Monroe County Schools (West Virginia)

== See also ==
- Monroe County School District (disambiguation)
- Monroe School (disambiguation)
