= Big Creek High School =

Coordinates: 37°18′15.1″N 81°40′26.4″W

- War, West Virginia 24892

Information
- School type: High School
- Founded: 1932
- Closed: 2010
- School board: McDowell County Schools
- Grades: 9–12
- Language: English
- Color: Green And White
- Fight song: On, On, Green and White
- Mascot: Owl
- Team name: Big Creek Owls
- Website: http://boe.mcdo.k12.wv.us/bigcreek/default.htm

Big Creek High School was a Grade 9 through 12 public high school located in War, West Virginia. It was operated by the McDowell County Schools and governed by the McDowell County Board of Education. Big Creek High School closed after the 2009–2010 school term and was consolidated with nearby Iaeger High School to form River View High School.

== History ==
Because of delays in construction, the school started the 1931–32 sharing premises at Caretta School. The school opened on January 4, 1932. Initially, there were 205 all-white students with the school becoming fully integrated in 1965. BCHS is constructed in the Collegiate Gothic style and is eligible to be published in the National Register of Historic Places.

The school was closed in 2010 to make way for a consolidated school at Bradshaw, West Virginia, the ground breaking ceremony for which was held on September 21, 2005. Construction began in early 2008.

Also in 2005, a ground breaking ceremony was held on the BCHS football field. The field was to be converted into a consolidated school of War, Bartley, and Berwind Elementaries. Although Native American remains from the Late Woodland period were found on the site, the construction continued until April 9, 2007 when the new school, named "Southside" opened.

On July 17, 2015 at around 5:30am, the building caught fire and was burnt severely. The fire occurred during the same week that the building was supposed to be demolished.

== Athletics ==
Big Creek High was the first school in McDowell County and Southern West Virginia and the second in West Virginia to play football after dark after the installation of field lights.

=== State Titles ===
- Football -
  - 1932(A)

=== State Finalists ===
- Football -
  - 1952(A), 1976(AA), 1997(A)

== Notable alumni ==
- Bob Gresham, NFL running back
- Homer Hickam, author of Rocket Boys, Vietnam War veteran, retired NASA engineer
- Freida J. Riley, teacher
- Quentin Wilson, engineer
