= John Brewer (fullback) =

American football player (1928–1983)

No. 36
- Position: Fullback

Personal information
- Born: August 26, 1928; Twin Branch, West Virginia, U.S.
- Died: July 28, 1983 (aged 54); Louisville, Kentucky, U.S.
- Listed height: 6 ft 4 in (1.93 m)
- Listed weight: 230 lb (104 kg)

Career information
- High school: Iaeger (Iaeger, West Virginia)
- College: Louisville (1948–1951)
- NFL draft: 1952: 28th round, 329th overall pick

Career history
- Philadelphia Eagles (1952–1953); Washington Redskins (1954)*
- * Offseason or practice squad member only

Career NFL statistics
- Rushing yards: 273
- Rushing average: 4.1
- Receptions: 9
- Receiving yards: 62
- Total touchdowns: 3
- Stats at Pro Football Reference

John Edward Brewer Jr. (August 26, 1928 – July 28, 1983) was an American professional football fullback who played two seasons with the Philadelphia Eagles of the National Football League (NFL). He was selected by the Eagles in the 28th round of the 1952 NFL draft after playing college football at the University of Louisville.

== Early life and college ==
John Edward Brewer Jr. was born on August 26, 1928, in Twin Branch, West Virginia. He attended Iaeger High School in Iaeger, West Virginia.

Brewer was a four-year letterman for the Louisville Cardinals of the University of Louisville from 1948 to 1951.

== Professional career ==
Brewer was selected by the Philadelphia Eagles in the 28th round, with the 329th overall pick, of the 1952 NFL draft. He signed with the team on March 8, 1952. He played in all 12 games, starting five, for the Eagles during the 1952 season, rushing 50 times for 188 yards and two touchdowns while also catching five passes for 19 yards. Brewer appeared in six games in 1953, recording 17 rushing attempts for 85 yards and one touchdown, and four receptions for 43 yards.

Brewer signed with the Washington Redskins on May 1, 1954. He was released on September 13, 1954.

== Personal life ==
Brewer died on July 28, 1983, in Louisville, Kentucky.
