= Mount View High School (West Virginia) =

Location
- 950 Mount View Road; Welch, West Virginia 24801; United States; 37.4037°N 81.5427°W

Information
- School type: Public, high school
- Motto: "Supporting each student’s quest for college and career success"
- Established: 1975
- School district: McDowell County Schools
- Superintendent: Dr. Ingrida Barker
- Principal: Tim Kennedy
- Staff: 75 people
- Grades: 6, 7, 8, 9, 10, 11, 12
- Enrollment: 553 (2023-2024)
- Average class size: 15–20 students
- Student to teacher ratio: 14.1
- Language: English
- Colors: Gold; Brown; White
- Sports: Basketball, Football, Baseball, Golf, Volleyball, Tennis, Softball
- Mascot: Golden Knight
- Nickname: Golden Knights
- Rivals: Riverview High School; Man High School; Westside High School; Wyoming East High School
- Yearbook: Golden Memories
- Communities served: Welch, Gary, Kimball, Davy, Northfork, Elkhorn, Anawalt
- Website: https://boe.mcdo.k12.wv.us/o/mvhs

Mount View High School (MVHS) is a public high school in Welch, West Virginia. Located on the grounds of an old strip mine in the mountains of McDowell County, West Virginia, Mount View High School is one of two schools in the Welch area, with the other being Welch Elementary School. As of 2010, the school teaches forty-seven courses for its students, and serves grades 6–12. The school's colors are gold and brown, which are also shown on the school's mascot, the Golden Knight. The average class size is around fifteen to twenty students per teacher, and the school had a combined population of 812 students as of 2014. Mount View High School has previously offered evening college classes from Bluefield State College.

== History ==
Mount View High School was built on Tom's Mountain and opened in the fall of 1978 and is still operational today. Mount View High School's population came from three other schools: Welch High School, Gary High School, and Northfork High.

In 2002, McDowell County Schools (MCS) decided to move the seventh and eighth grade to Mount View. Afterwards, the school experienced major renovations including building a new wing for the seventh graders and building a new auditorium for all the students; the auditorium would be named after the first principal of the school as Bob N. Jack Auditorium. In 2005, MCS decided to move the sixth grade to Mount View. Lack of space for the six graders caused MVHS to take a section of the media center off to form a new wing for the sixth graders. Mount View High School also built a new gymnasium for middle school students. In 2007 former principal Adam E. Grygiel became the main principal of the entire school. Before the 2009–2010 school term began, Mount View Middle and Mount View High merged to form one school with grades 6–12. In 2008 retired seventh grade science teacher Edward Evans became the National Science Teacher of the Year which brought new technology to the school. In preparation for the 2016–17 school year, the West Virginia Secondary School Activities Commission (WVSSAC) lowered the school's classification to Class A after the school's enrollment decreased to 420 students in grades 9–12. Despite having 420 students, the school is ranked third largest in West Virginia's Class A.

=== Achievements ===
- 1999 Class AA Region VII, Section 1 winners (Basketball). First time in school history.
- 2002 Southern Conference Football Champions Mount View Middle 8-0 Record
- Grade 7 and 8 Football – 2008 McDowell County champions.
- Grades 6-8 Baseball: 2008 McDowell County Champions (16-1); 2009 McDowell County Champions (15-0)
- 2005-2006 Class AA Regional Winners (Basketball) First time in school history.

=== Organizations ===
- Senior Beta Club
- Interact Club
- Student Government Association
- Senior Class SGA
- Junior Class SGA
- Sophomore SGA
- Freshmen SGA
- HSTA Club
- Upward Bound
- Student Council 6–8
- Junior Beta Club
- Beginners Band
- Boys'/Girls' Basketball

== See also ==
- List of high schools in West Virginia
- Education in West Virginia
