= Boone County Schools =

Boone County Schools may refer to:

- Boone County Schools (Kentucky), US
- Boone County Schools (West Virginia), US
