= Webster County High School =

Webster County High School may refer to several schools in the United States:

- Webster County High School (Georgia), a school in Preston, Georgia
- Webster County High School (Kentucky), a school in Dixon, Kentucky
- Webster County High School (West Virginia), a school in Upperglade, West Virginia
