= Webster County High School (West Virginia) =

Coordinates: 38°24′26.4″N 80°30′22.0″W

Location
- One Highlander Drive; Upperglade, Webster County, West Virginia; United States

Information
- School type: Public
- Motto: "Taking Care of Business"
- Opened: 1974
- Status: Open
- School board: Webster County Board of Education
- School district: Webster County Schools
- Superintendent: Joesph Arbogast
- Principal: Gabe Markle
- Head of school: Mr. Bonnet
- Staff: 31
- Teaching staff: 41.25 (FTE)
- Grades: 9-12
- Average class size: 27
- Student to teacher ratio: 11.85
- Hours in school day: 8 hours 5 minutes
- Classrooms: 33
- Campus type: Rural
- Colors: Black and red
- Song: Highlander Pride
- Athletics: Boys: Basketball, Football, Baseball, Cross Country, Track, Wrestling. Girls: Basketball, Cheerleading, Softball, Cross Country, and Track.
- Athletics conference: Class AA; Coalfield Conference
- Sports: Football, Basketball
- Mascot: the Highlander
- Nickname: WCHS
- Team name: Highlanders
- Rival: Richwood High School
- Accreditation: West Virginia Department of Education
- Feeder schools: Webster Springs Elementary School; Glade Middle/Junior High School; Diana Middle School; Hacker Valley Middle School
- Alumni: Josh Stewart, Phil Cogar
- Website: School website

Webster County High School, in Upperglade, West Virginia, is a public high school, established in 1974.

== History ==
Webster County High School was opened in 1974, the result of the consolidation of Cowen High School and Webster Springs High School. Daniel Bean became the first principal of the new school, which was built on land acquired by eminent domain from Twyla M. Robinson, daughter of James B. Miller and Alice I. Williams. The land acquisition was disputed in the courts until the mid-1980s.

On February 19, 2008, Senator Jay Rockefeller visited Webster County High School to speak with students about technology in education.

== Notable alumni ==
- Josh Stewart – actor on the television shows Third Watch and Dirt

== See also ==
- List of high schools in West Virginia
- Education in West Virginia
