= Paw Paw High School (West Virginia) =

High school in West Virginia, United States

Coordinates: 39°31′39.5″N 78°27′17.2″W

Location
- 60 Pirate Circle; Paw Paw, (Morgan County), West Virginia 25434; United States

Information
- Type: Public high school
- Principal: Melinda Kasekamp
- Staff: 9.70 (FTE)
- Grades: K-12
- Enrollment: 77 (2023-24)
- Student to teacher ratio: 7.94
- Colors: Red, white, and black
- Mascot: pirate
- Nickname: Pirates
- Website: Paw Paw High School

Paw Paw High School in Paw Paw, West Virginia serves grades 7 through 12 with approximately 100 students enrolled and over 20 faculty members. It is one of the two high schools in Morgan County along with Berkeley Springs High School in Berkeley Springs.

Paw Paw High School is a part of the Paw Paw Schools complex which also consists of Paw Paw Elementary School. Its principal is Melinda Kasekamp.

== Notability ==
In October 23, 2019, Gov. Jim Justice appeared at Paw Paw High School (Among with Martinsburg South Middle School) to celebrate recent success the school achieved as one of the top-performing schools in West Virginia on the statewide Balanced Scorecard Accountability System.

== Sports ==
Paw Paw High School sports include:

- Basketball
- Baseball
- Volleyball
- Cheerleading
- Cross-Country
- Track

== See also ==
- Morgan County Schools
- List of high schools in West Virginia
- Education in West Virginia
