= Mountaineer Middle School =

Mountaineer Middle School may refer to:

- A Harrison County Middle School in Clarksburg, West Virginia
- A public school in Morgantown, West Virginia
