= Morgan County Schools =

Morgan County Schools can refer to a U.S. public school system in several states, including:

- Morgan County Schools (Alabama)
- Morgan County School District in Georgia
- Morgan County Schools (Tennessee) in Morgan County, Tennessee
- Morgan County Schools (West Virginia)
