= Lincoln High School (West Virginia) =

Location
- 100 Jerry Toth Drive; Shinnston, West Virginia 26431; United States; 39.38069°N 80.31088°W

Information
- Opened: September 5, 1978
- School district: Harrison County
- Superintendent: Dora Stutler
- Principal: David Decker
- Assistant Principals: William Boggess; Holly Hawkins
- Teaching staff: 38.67 (FTE)
- Grades: 9-12
- Enrollment: 527 (2024-2025)
- Student to teacher ratio: 13.63
- Colors: Brown and Vegas gold
- Athletics conference: Big Ten
- Nickname: Cougars
- Feeder schools: Lincoln Middle School; Big Elm Elementary School; Lumberport Elementary School
- Website: www.harcoboe.net/o/lincoln-hs

Lincoln High School is comprehensive four-year public high school located in Shinnston, West Virginia, in Harrison County, in the United States. It operates as part of the Harrison County School District.

Lincoln High School derived its name from the first public school located in Harrison County in the vicinity of the nearby community of Gypsy. Site preparation began in the spring of 1975. Groundbreaking ceremonies for the building were held on September 9, 1976. The cornerstone laying was June 4, 1977. A new addition was completed for the 1994–95 school year.

== Feeder pattern ==
Lincoln High School students come from a shared campus middle school, Lincoln Middle. Lincoln's two feeder elementary schools are Big Elm Elementary and Lumberport Elementary. Students enrolled at these schools are from numerous surrounding areas such as Wallace, Sardis, Lumberport, Shinnston, Enterprise, Gypsy, Spelter, and Wyatt.

== Athletics ==
- Football
- Basketball
- Track
- Baseball
- Softball
- Tennis
- Soccer
- Swimming
- Wrestling
- Cross country
- Cheerleading (extracurricular activity)

== Athletics ==
Lincoln High School has been somewhat successful in the athletic department in recent years. They have boasted six state titles since 2003 and four state runner-up positions, although four of the state titles are from the extracurricular activity of cheerleading. The two true athletic state titles have been won by the Lincoln baseball team: in 2003, and most recently in 2009. They beat 2008 state runner-up Point Pleasant by a score of 6-2 to clinch that game.

The boys' basketball team also finished state runner-up once in 2004, losing to Winfield in overtime by a score of 52-51. Lincoln's girls' basketball team has also finished state runner-up twice in both 2008 and 2009 losing both times to the same opponent Summers County High School.

In 1979, Lincoln's second year in existence, the varsity football team under Coach Larry Burner finished the regular season with a 9-1 record ranked 7th in AAA, losing only to unbeaten Bridgeport 26-8. Led by a stingy defense that allowed an average of only 11 points a game, they recorded four shutouts. The team met Bridgeport in the first round of the playoffs, where they lost again to the eventual state champion Indians. The 1979 football team's final ranking of 7th in Class AAA is the school's highest football ranking ever.

Cheerleading has also been successful at Lincoln High. In 1996 the Lincoln cheerleaders won their first state recognition, coming home with a state runner-up trophy. In 2002 the cheerleaders once again competed in the state competition and came home with a state title. They also brought home the title three years in a row from 2005-2007 and finished runner-up in 2008, losing to Harrison County rival Liberty. Lincoln returned to the state competition in 2022, winning its first state championship in fifteen years.

Lincoln High School state championship history
Boys' sports	State titles	State runners-up	Girls' sports	State titles	State runners-up
Baseball	2003, 2009		Softball		
Basketball		2004	Basketball		2008, 2009
Cross country			Cross country		2025
Golf			Cheerleading	2002, 2005, 2006, 2007, 2022, 2025	1996, 2008, 2011
Football			Volleyball		
Soccer			Soccer		2025
Swimming			Swimming		
Tennis			Tennis		
Track & field			Track & field		2026
Wrestling					
Boys' total	2	1	Girls' total	6	8

== Marching band ==
The band has marched in multiple notable parades and competitions, including the West Virginia Apple Blossom Festival; the West Virginia Buckwheat Festival, the West Virginia Forest Festival, the West Virginia Strawberry Festival; the West Virginia Italian Heritage Festival; parades at Epcot, MGM Disney, and Magic Kingdom Disney; and the St. Patrick's Day Parade in New York City. They were also selected to perform at the Kennedy Center in New York. In the spring semester, the band functions as a concert band as well as a pep band for basketball games, and they attend the annual Band Festival each year to be adjudicated.

The original director of the band was Louis Oliverio, who directed the band for its first 24 years. He was followed by Drew Aires in 2002, who was eventually followed by Bill Way two years later. Way retired in 2009 and the band came under the direction of Fred and Julie Channell.

== Jazz band ==
In addition to the marching band, Lincoln High School also offers a jazz band program that is directed by Fred and Julie Channell. Although jazz music is the main focus, they play a variety of genres. The band performs at the Huntington International Jazz Festival as well as other local events each year. The jazz band, along with some volunteers, forms the graduation band that plays at every graduation ceremony.

== Extra curricular activities ==
Lincoln High School is currently a host of a Naval Junior Reserve Officers Training Corp (NJROTC) unit. The NJROTC is a branch of the Junior Reserve Officers' Training Corps, in which students are, according to Title 10, Section 2031 of the United States Code, instilled with the values of citizenship, service to the United States, and personal responsibility and a sense of accomplishment. Cadets (students) within the unit can choose to participate in multiple different extra curricular teams, such as: drill, color guard, rifle, academic, athletic, and orienteering teams.

Lincoln is also a host to multiple other chapters of extra curricular organizations, including: a DECA-FBLA chapter which combines the DECA (organization) and FBLA-PBL chapters, a National FFA Organization chapter, as well as multiple student-led clubs that aren't chapters of larger organizations. Students can also become eligible and be accepted into the National Honor Society, National English Honor Society and the National Technical Honor Society.

== Notable events ==
In February 2009, during a home girls' basketball game, a severe thunderstorm with winds near 70 mph swept through the area and tore off the majority of the rubber roofing on the gymnasium. The roof was deemed a total loss.

== Notable people ==
=== As Shinston High School ===
- Joe Stydahar, former NFL player and coach, West Virginia Sports Hall of Fame
