= Chapmanville, West Virginia =

- Town
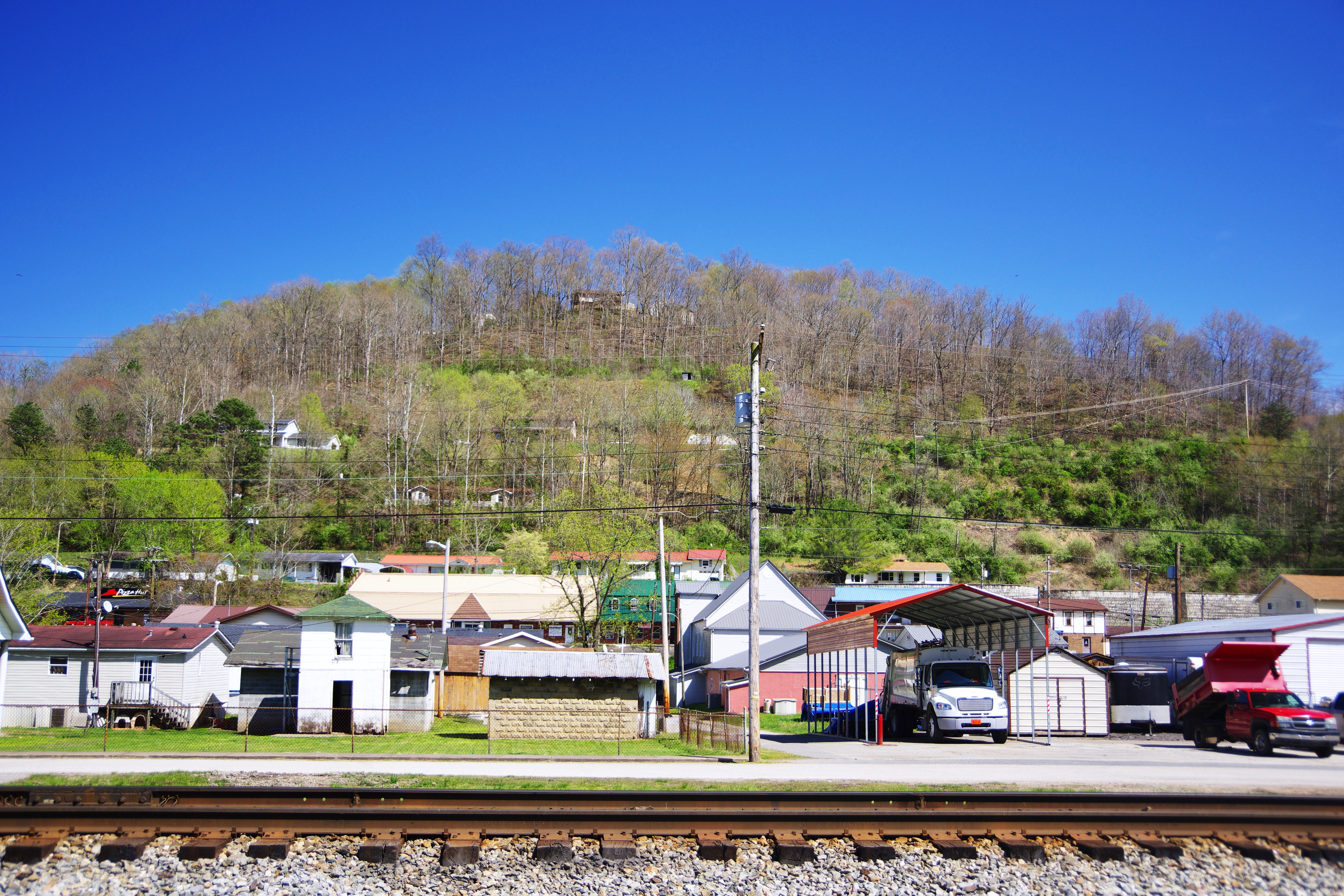
- Chapmanville

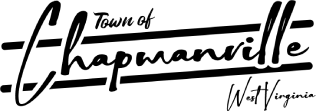
- Flag Seal Logo

- Location of Chapmanville in Logan County, West Virginia.
- Coordinates: 37°58′18″N 82°1′12″W
- Country: United States
- State: West Virginia
- County: Logan

Government
  - Type: Mayor, Council
  - Mayor: Joel McNeely
  - Recorder: Phillip Williamson
  - Council: Harry Freeman, Dean "Doc" Williams, Brookie Craddock, Ben DesRocher, George Cook

Area
  - Total: 0.68 sq mi (1.76 km^{2})
  - Land: 0.66 sq mi (1.70 km^{2})
  - Water: 0.023 sq mi (0.06 km^{2})
- Elevation: 640 ft (195 m)

Population (2020)
  - Total: 1,020
  - Estimate (2021): 1,001
  - Density: 1,665.2/sq mi (642.93/km^{2})
- Time zone: UTC-5 (Eastern (EST))
  - Summer (DST): UTC-4 (EDT)
- ZIP code: 25508
- Area codes: 304 & 681
- FIPS code: 54-14524
- GNIS feature ID: 1537207
- Website: https://chapmanvillewv.gov/

Chapmanville is a town in Logan County, West Virginia, United States. The population was 1,025 at the 2020 census. Chapmanville is named for Ned Chapman, an early settler who operated a store and post office. It was incorporated July 15, 1947.

== Geography ==
Chapmanville is located in northern Logan County at 37°58′18″N 82°1′12″W (37.971615, -82.020017). It is situated between the mouth of Crawley Creek and Godby Branch along the Guyandotte River at a point where the northward-flowing river briefly bends sharply southwestwardly before turning north again.

U.S. Route 119 and West Virginia Route 10, both of which approach from Logan to the south, intersect in Chapmanville. From this intersection, WV 10 continues northward in the direction of Huntington, while US 119 veers northeastward toward Charleston.

According to the United States Census Bureau, the town has a total area of 0.67 square miles (1.74 km^{2}), of which 0.65 square miles (1.68 km^{2}) is land and 0.02 square miles (0.05 km^{2}) is water.

== Demographics ==
Historical population
Census	Pop.	Note	%±
1950	1,349		—
1960	1,241		−8.0%
1970	1,175		−5.3%
1980	1,164		−0.9%
1990	1,110		−4.6%
2000	1,211		9.1%
2010	1,256		3.7%
2020	1,020		−18.8%
2021 (est.)	1,001	▼	−1.9%
U.S. Decennial Census

=== 2010 census ===
As of the census of 2010, there were 1,256 people, 604 households, and 338 families living in the town. The population density was 1,932.3 inhabitants per square mile (746.1/km^{2}). There were 667 housing units at an average density of 1,026.2 per square mile (396.2/km^{2}). The racial makeup of the town was 98.2% White, 0.2% African American, 0.6% Asian, 0.4% from other races, and 0.6% from two or more races. Hispanic or Latino of any race were 1.4% of the population.

There were 604 households, of which 26.7% had children under the age of 18 living with them, 38.7% were married couples living together, 12.4% had a female householder with no husband present, 4.8% had a male householder with no wife present, and 44.0% were non-families. 40.2% of all households were made up of individuals, and 21.2% had someone living alone who was 65 years of age or older. The average household size was 2.08 and the average family size was 2.77.

The median age in the town was 42.4 years. 18.4% of residents were under the age of 18; 7.2% were between the ages of 18 and 24; 27.1% were from 25 to 44; 27.5% were from 45 to 64; and 19.7% were 65 years of age or older. The gender makeup of the town was 46.1% male and 53.9% female.

=== 2000 census ===
As of the census of 2000, there were 1,211 people, 581 households, and 330 families living in the town. The population density was 1,797.4 inhabitants per square mile (697.9/km^{2}). There were 658 housing units at an average density of 976.6 per square mile (379.2/km^{2}). The racial makeup of the town was 98.84% White, 0.74% Asian, and 0.41% from two or more races. Hispanic or Latino of any race were 0.41% of the population.

There were 581 households, out of which 23.1% had children under the age of 18 living with them, 40.8% were married couples living together, 13.8% had a female householder with no husband present, and 43.2% were non-families. 40.3% of all households were made up of individuals, and 20.0% had someone living alone who was 65 years of age or older. The average household size was 2.08 and the average family size was 2.82.

In the town, the population was spread out, with 19.0% under the age of 18, 9.5% from 18 to 24, 26.5% from 25 to 44, 25.1% from 45 to 64, and 19.9% who were 65 years of age or older. The median age was 41 years. For every 100 females, there were 77.0 males. For every 100 females age 18 and over, there were 76.4 males.

The median income for a household in the town was $23,077, and the median income for a family was $38,250. Males had a median income of $28,500 versus $20,769 for females. The per capita income for the town was $15,581. About 12.1% of families and 20.3% of the population were below the poverty line, including 31.7% of those under age 18 and 16.4% of those age 65 or over.

== History ==
=== Captain Farley's Raid ===
Captain Henry Farley, a veteran of the Revolutionary War and resident of Montgomery County, Virginia, was the first known Anglo visitor to present-day Chapmanville. In June 1792, Captain Farley passed through the area while pursuing a Native American war party that had raided Virginia settlements at Bluestone River. By the time he reached what is today Chapmanville, he and his group had already engaged the retreating natives in the headwaters of Coal River and in the Guyandotte River valley some two miles below what is today Logan. Farley pursued the natives to the mouth of the Guyandotte River before returning home.

=== Pioneer Settlers ===
Chapmanville was settled by the Chapman and Ferrell families. The following families were also important in its early history: Butcher, Conley, Dingess, Godby, and Stollings.

=== Civil War ===
During the American Civil War, Chapmanville residents overwhelmingly supported the Confederacy. The Battle of Kanawha Gap occurred at Chapmanville on September 25, 1861. A highway historical marker commemorates the battle. An irregular pro-Confederate unit called the Black-Striped Company operated in the vicinity throughout the war. A legend persists that a Union payroll of gold coins is buried on the west side of the river in Chapmanville.

== Government ==
The town is governed by the Mayor and Council System. The Mayor, Recorder, and the Council are elected by the voters of the town. The Council consists of five members. The Mayor is charged with the day-to-day operations of the town. The Recorder takes minutes and controls the finances. The Council serves as the local legislative body. Members fulfill their duties by enacting ordinances, resolutions, and advocating on behalf of the citizens. Each member is elected to a four-year term. Council meetings are held on the second Tuesday of every month at 7:00 PM EST and as necessary. These meetings are advertised in accordance with West Virginia law. The town employs a police department, a street and sanitation department, and Town Clerks. The town also has a water department, which is overseen by the Chapmanville Water Board, and a volunteer fire department.

== Education ==
Chapmanville is home to Chapmanville Regional High School, West Virginia's first cross-county consolidated high school, which includes grades 9-12. The student body consists of students from a consolidation agreement with the West Virginia Department of Education, West Virginia School Building Authority, Lincoln County Schools, and Logan County Schools that consolidated Harts High School and Chapmanville High School to form Chapmanville Regional High School. It opened on June 1, 2007. Chapmanville hosts the second largest student population in the county. The town is also home to Chapmanville Middle School (grades 5–8), Chapmanville Intermediate School, and Chapmanville Primary School. All schools in the city use the tiger as their mascot.

== History of Elected Officials ==
=== 2023-Current ===
Mayor - Joel S. McNeely

Recorder - Phillip Williamson II

Council - Harry Freeman, Dean "Doc" Williams, Brookie Craddock, Ben DesRocher, George Cook.

=== 2019-2023 ===
Mayor - Raamie Barker, Joel S. McNeely

Recorder - Teri Lynn Wilson, Phillip Williamson II

== Culture and the Arts ==
Chapmanville hosts the Apple Butter Festival every September. It also serves as the location of the Wallace Horn Friendly Neighbor Radio Show.

== Recreation ==
Chapmanville recently acquired a connector to the Hatfield-McCoy Trails. The WV DNR provides public stream access to the river in Chapmanville.

== Notable people ==
- Shane Burton, retired American football defensive tackle
- Charles Mobley Gore, Jr. (1930–1984), country music performer and member of the state legislature
- Danny Godby, Major League Baseball player
- Earl Ray Tomblin, former Governor of West Virginia
- Chris Ojeda, musician, Byzantine
