= Richwood High School =

Richwood High School may refer to:

- Richwood High School (Louisiana) in Ouachita Parish, Louisiana
- Richwood High School (West Virginia) in Richwood, West Virginia

== See also ==
- Richwoods High School in Peoria, Illinois and formerly in Richwoods Township, Peoria County, Illinois
