= Longpole, West Virginia =

Longpole
- Unincorporated community
- Location within West Virginia Longpole (the United States)
- Coordinates: 37°30′45″N 81°51′48″W
- Country: United States
- State: West Virginia
- County: McDowell
- Elevation: 1,125 ft (343 m)
- Time zone: UTC-5 (Eastern (EST))
  - Summer (DST): UTC-4 (EDT)
- Area codes: 304 & 681
- GNIS feature ID: 1549797

Longpole is an unincorporated community in McDowell County, West Virginia, United States. Longpole is 4.3 miles (6.9 km) northwest of Iaeger.
