= Wardensville School =

Defunct school in West Virginia, United States

Coordinates: 39°04′49″N 78°35′29″W

- Wardensville, Hardy County, West Virginia; United States

Information
- Closed: 1980

Wardensville School was located in Wardensville, West Virginia. The school building is still standing today. In 1980, the Wardensville and Mathias School consolidated and became East Hardy High School. The Wardensville School mascot was the Warrior.
