= Crawley Creek =

Stream in West Virginia, U.S.

Coordinates: 37°58′15″N 82°02′19″W

Crawley Creek is a stream in the U.S. state of West Virginia.

Crawley Creek has the name of James Crawley, a pioneer surveyor.

Tims Fork flows into this creek.

== See also ==
- List of rivers of West Virginia
