= Robert C. Byrd High School =

Location
- One Eagle Way; Clarksburg, Harrison County, West Virginia 26301; United States; 39°15′32″N 80°21′6″W

Information
- School type: Public, high school
- Founded: 1996
- School district: Harrison County Schools
- Superintendent: Dora Stutler
- Principal: Dr. Jamie Looker
- Assistant Principals: Robert Herrod; Eric Post; Kelly Light; Jason Haynes
- Grades: 9-12
- Enrollment: 960 (2025-2026)
- Student to teacher ratio: 12
- Colors: Blue and green
- Athletics conference: Big Ten Conference
- Mascot: Eagle
- Rival: Bridgeport High School
- Accreditation: North Central Association of Secondary Schools and Colleges
- Yearbook: Aerie
- Website: www.harcoboe.net/o/rcbhs

Robert C. Byrd High School (R.C.B.) is a public high school in Clarksburg, West Virginia.

The school, which serves grades 9-12, is a part of Harrison County Schools.

The school serves central and western Harrison County, West Virginia, including the city of Clarksburg, West Virginia, along with the towns of Nutter Fort, West Virginia, Salem, West Virginia and Stonewood, West Virginia. It is one of five public high schools in Harrison County. The school opened in 1996 as a consolidation of Washington Irving High School, and Roosevelt-Wilson High School.

For the 2025-26 school year, Liberty High School, serving the western portions of Clarksburg and Harrison County, was closed and students and staff were consolidated into R.C.B.

The student enrollment (as of 2025-26) is 960. The principal is Jamie Looker. The school's colors are Royal Blue and Kelly Green, and their mascot is the eagle.

The school's namesake is U.S. Senator Robert Byrd, who served from 1959 to 2010.

== Rankings ==
All Rankings as of 2025:

- 6,795th in National Rankings
- 34th in West Virginia High Schools
- 3rd in Clarksburg, WV Metro Area High Schools
- 2nd in Harrison County Schools High Schools

== Athletics ==
R.C.B. competes in team and individual competitions sanctioned by the West Virginia Secondary School Activities Commission and competes regionally in the (WV) Big Ten Conference.

=== Team State Championships ===
- Cheerleading: 2012, 2013, 2014, 2015, 2016, 2017, 2021
- Girls' Soccer: 2017, 2018
- Boys' Swimming: 2026
