= Monroe School =

Monroe School may refer to:

- Monroe School (Phoenix, Arizona), listed on the National Register of Historic Places in Maricopa County, Arizona
- Monroe School (Sandusky, Ohio), listed on the National Register of Historic Places in Sandusky, Ohio

== See also ==
- Monroe County Schools (disambiguation)
