= Hardy County Schools =

School district in West Virginia, US

Hardy County Schools is the operating school district within Hardy County, West Virginia. It is governed by the Hardy County Board of Education.

== Schools ==
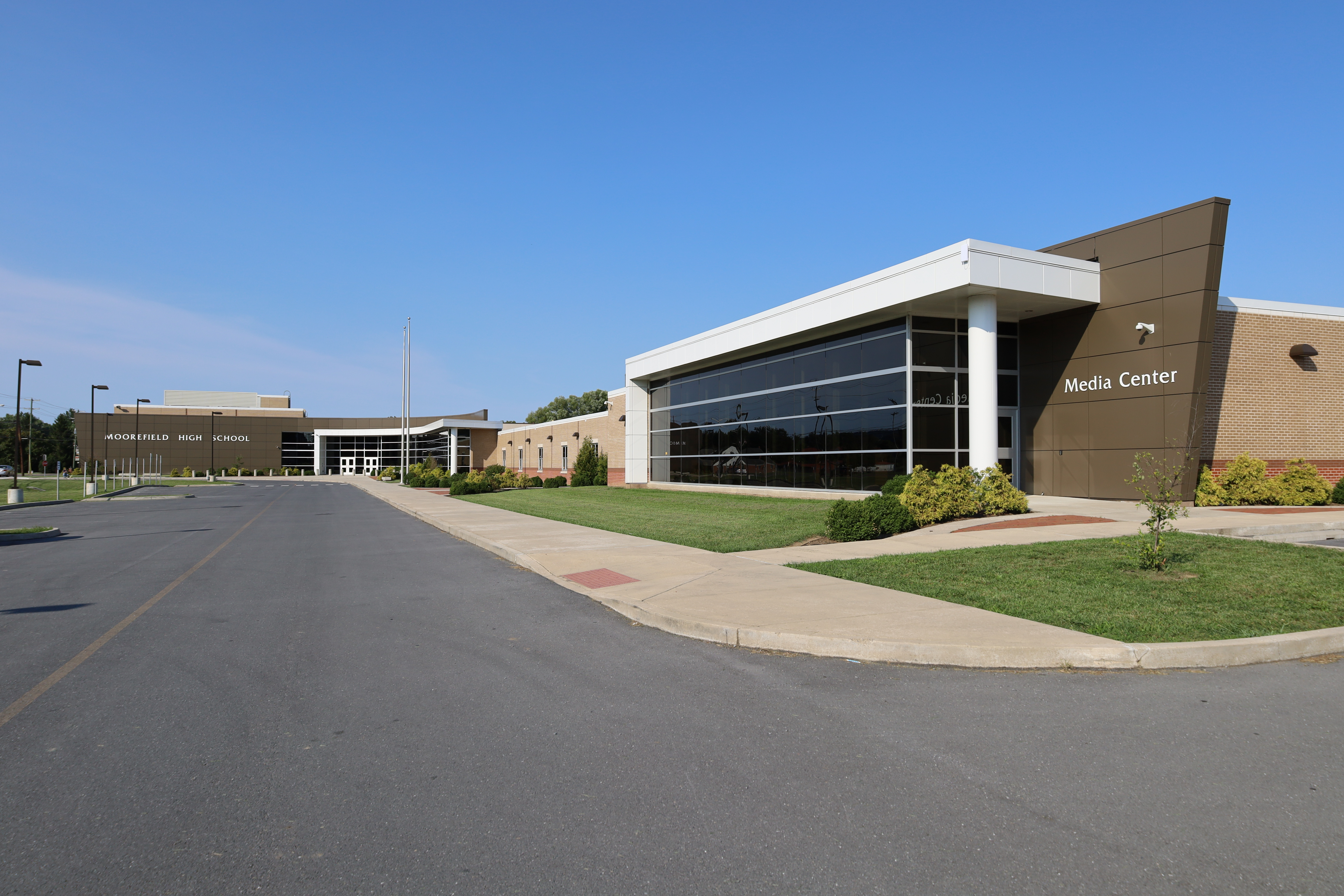
Moorefield High School in 2020

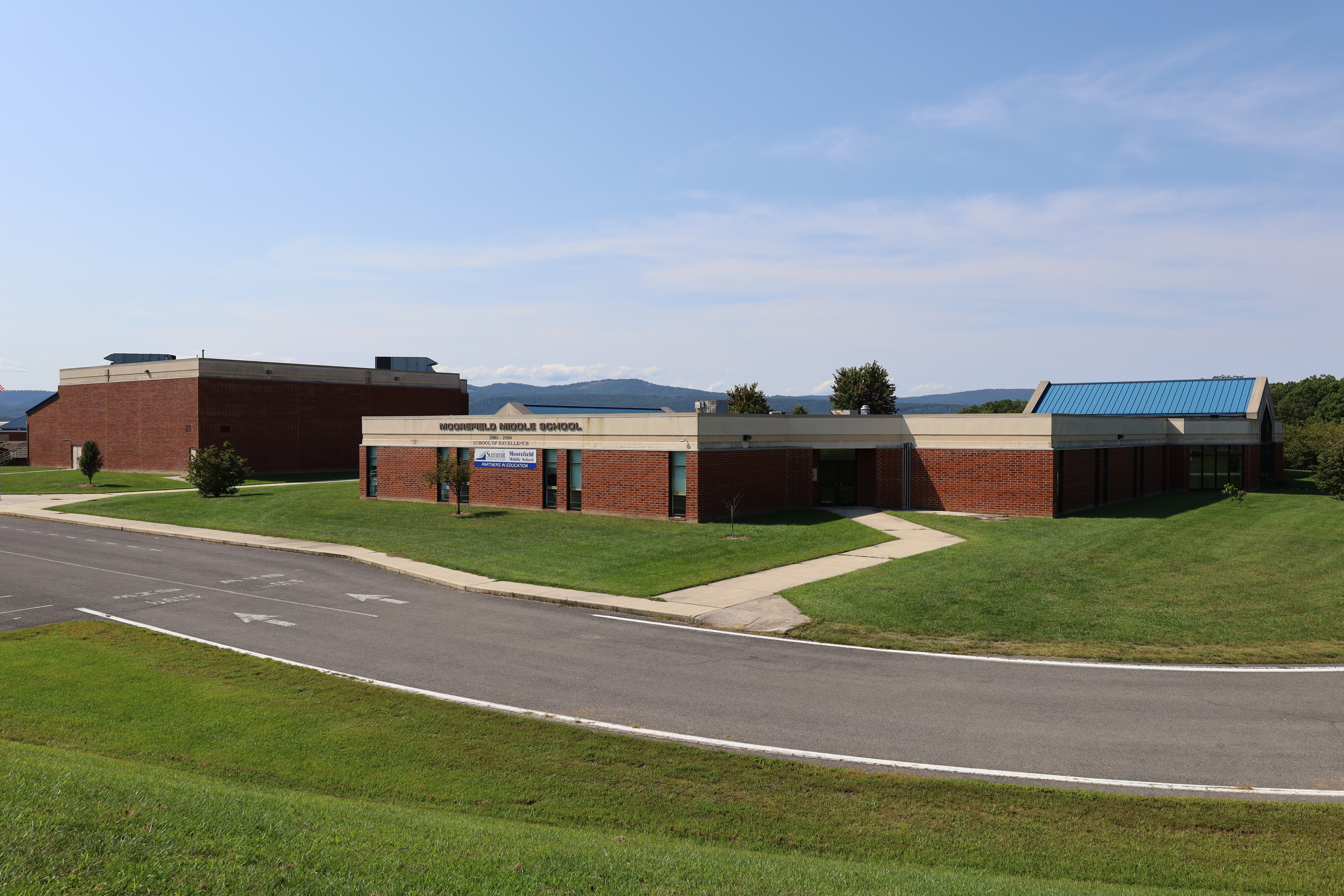
Moorefield Middle School in 2020

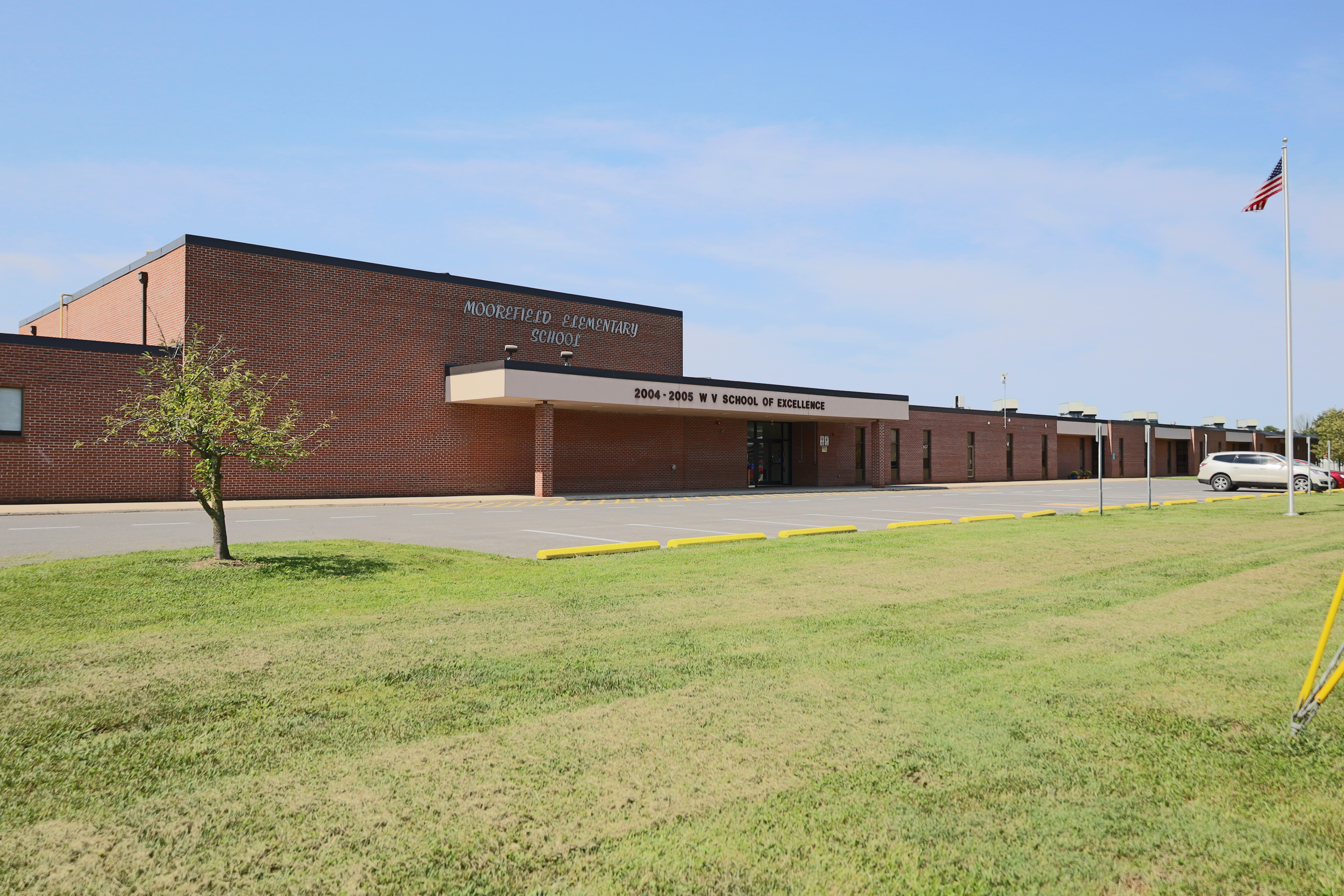
Moorefield Elementary School in 2020

=== High schools ===
- East Hardy High School
- Moorefield High School

=== Middle schools ===
- East Hardy Early Middle School
- Moorefield Middle School

=== Elementary schools ===
- Moorefield Elementary School

== Schools no longer in operation ==
- Mathias School
- Wardensville School
