= Twin Branch, West Virginia =

Twin Branch
- Unincorporated community
- Location within West Virginia Twin Branch (the United States)
- Coordinates: 37°28′29″N 81°40′06″W
- Country: United States
- State: West Virginia
- County: McDowell
- Elevation: 1,175 ft (358 m)
- Time zone: UTC-5 (Eastern (EST))
  - Summer (DST): UTC-4 (EDT)
- ZIP codes: 24889
- Area codes: 304 & 681
- GNIS feature ID: 1555845

Twin Branch is an unincorporated community in McDowell County, West Virginia, United States. Twin Branch is 1 mile (1.6 km) west-southwest of Davy. It was founded by Henry Ford as a mining community.

The community was named for the fact two streams meet at the town site.

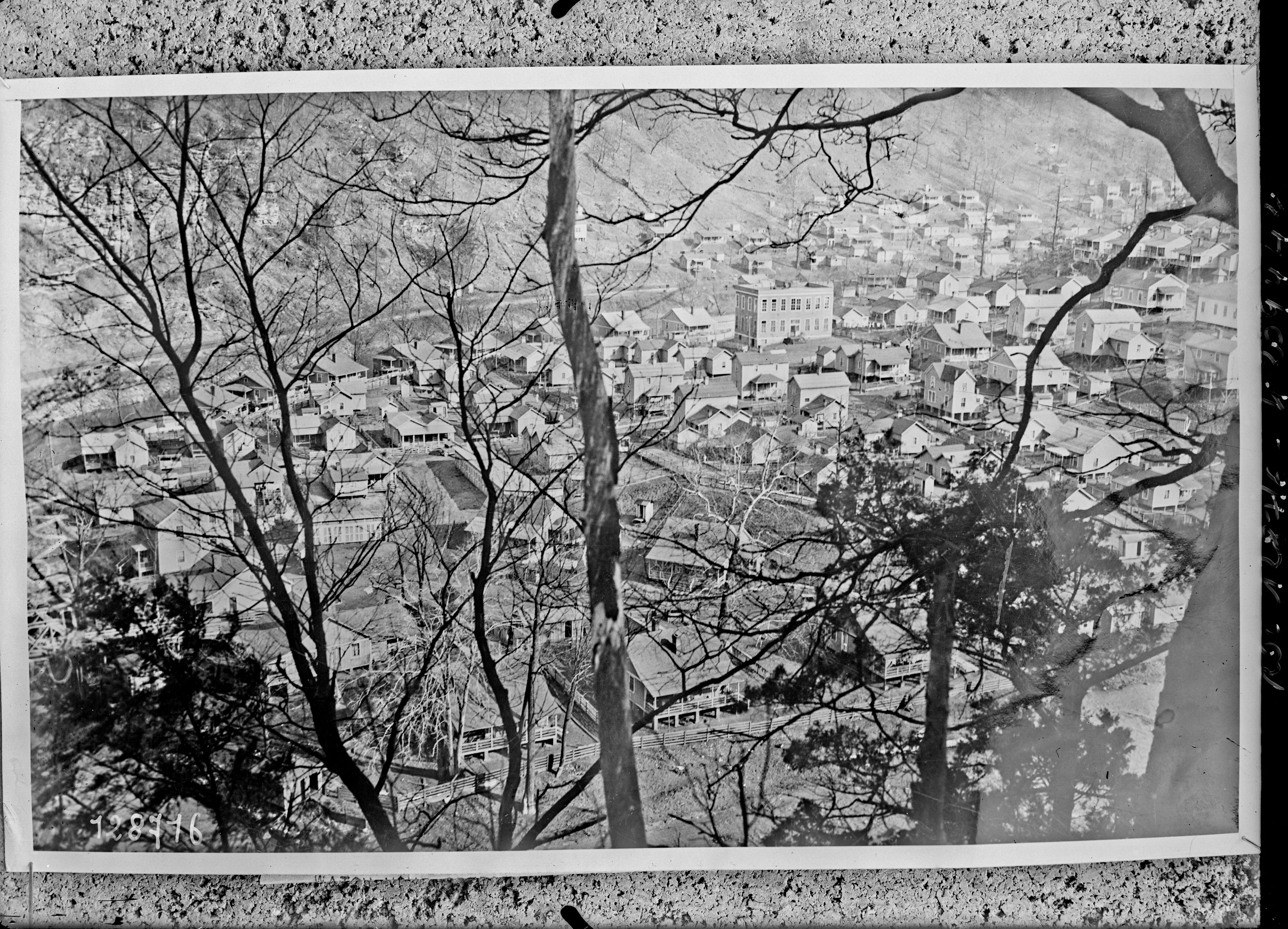
Twin Branch in 1928
