= Logan High School (West Virginia) =

Coordinates: 37°51′7.3″N 81°59′44.2″W

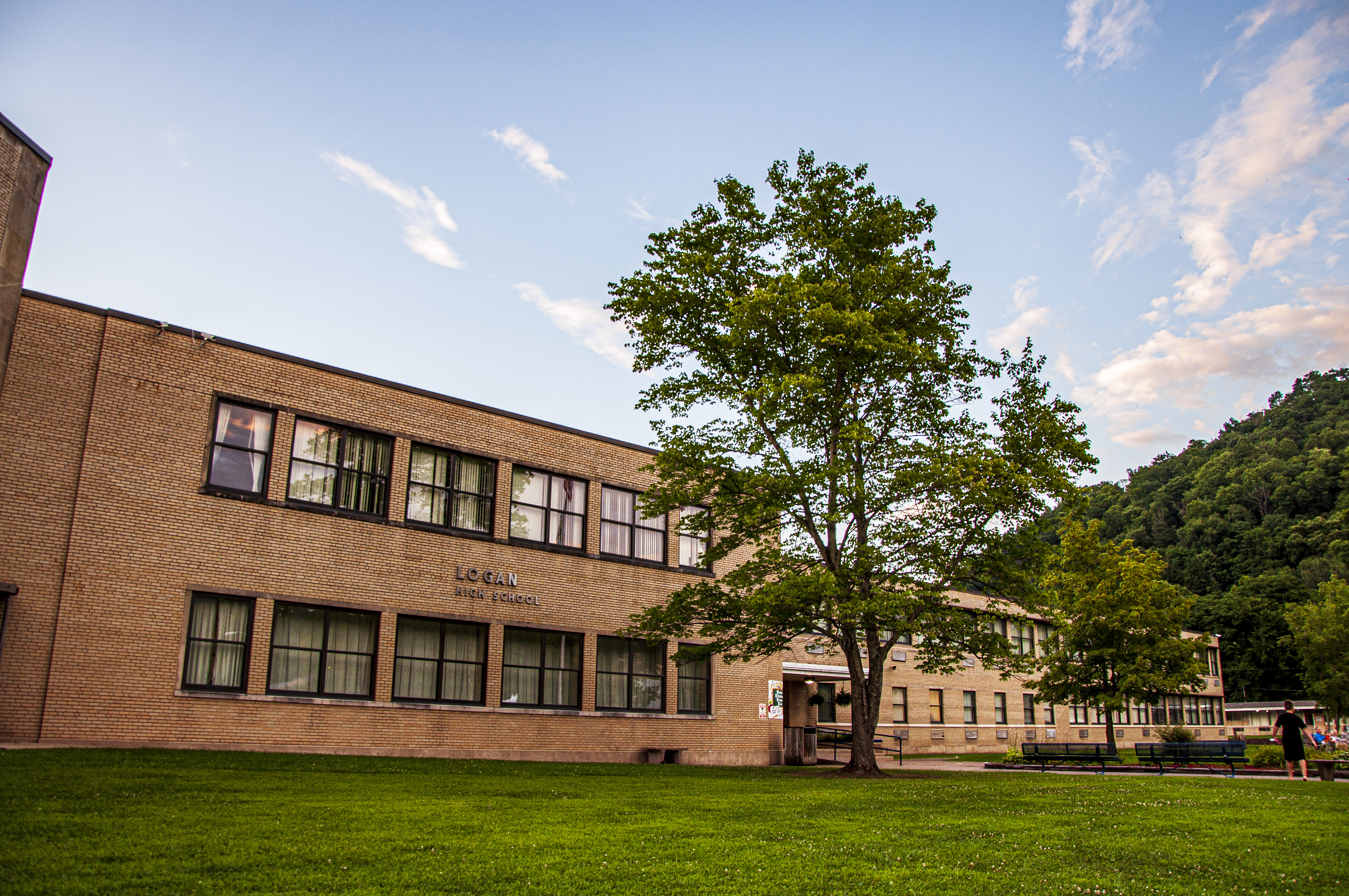
- Logan High School, July 4, 2019

Location
- One Wildcat Way; Logan, West Virginia 25601; United States

Information
- School type: Public high school
- Motto: Attitude, Action, Achievement
- Established: 1911
- School district: Logan County Schools
- Principal: Zachary Anderson
- Teaching staff: 41.52(FTE)
- Grades: 9-12
- Enrollment: 656 (2018-19)
- Student to teacher ratio: 15.81
- Colors: Blue; Gold
- Mascot: Wildcat
- Rival: Scott High School Chapmanville Regional High School
- Website: Official website

Logan High School is the high school for the town of Logan, West Virginia under the jurisdiction of Logan County Schools. Its current campus was built in 1957. The school campus sits on Hatfield Island, at the confluence of the Guyandotte River and Island Creek. The island is shared with an elementary school, middle school, and the town's public library.

== Notable alumni ==
- Richard Ojeda, state senator
- Walt Walowac, former professional basketball player, West Virginia Sports Hall of Fame
