= Boone County Schools (West Virginia) =

School district in West Virginia, United States

Location
- Boone County, West Virginia

District information
- Type: Public
- Superintendent: Allen Sexton
- NCES District ID: 5400090

Other information
- Website: www.boonecountyboe.org

Boone County Schools is the operating school district within Boone County, West Virginia.

== Schools ==
The following schools are in Boone County Schools:

=== High schools ===
- Boone Career and Technical Center
- Scott High School
- Sherman High School
- Van Junior/Senior High School

=== Middle schools ===
- Madison Middle School
- Sherman Junior High School
- Van Junior/Senior High School

=== Elementary schools ===
- Ashford-Rumble Elementary
- Brookview Elementary
- Madison Elementary
- Ramage Elementary
- Sherman Elementary School
- Van Elementary
- Whitesville Elementary School
