= Tims Fork =

River in West Virginia

Coordinates: 37°56′03″N 82°03′47″W

Tims Fork is a stream in the U.S. state of West Virginia.

Tims Fork was named after Timothy Wallace, a pioneer settler.

== See also ==
- List of rivers of West Virginia
