= Monroe County School District =

Monroe County School District is a name shared by several school districts in the United States.

- Monroe County School District (Alabama)
- Monroe County School District (Florida)
- Monroe County School District (Georgia)
- Monroe County School District (Kentucky) (see List of school districts in Kentucky)
- Monroe County School District (Mississippi)
