= Webster County Schools (West Virginia) =

School district in West Virginia, United States

Address
- 315 South Main Street Webster Springs, West Virginia, 26288; United States

District information
- Type: Public School District
- Superintendent: Joseph Arbogast
- NCES District ID: 5401530

Other information
- Website: boe.webs.k12.wv.us

Webster County Schools is the public school district serving Webster County, West Virginia, with its main office located in Webster Springs.

== Board of education ==
Webster County Schools is under the supervision of the elected Webster County Board of Education.

== Schools ==
=== High schools ===
- Webster County High School, Upperglade

=== Elementary schools ===
- Hacker Valley Elementary, Hacker Valley
- Glade Elementary School, Cowen
- Webster Springs Elementary, Webster Springs

=== Former schools ===
- Cowen High School
- Cowen Grade School
- Webster Springs High School
- Glade Middle School
- Diana Elementary School
- Bergoo Grade School
- Camden Elementary School
- Elkhorn Grade School
- Sand Run Grade School
- Mud Lick Grade School
- Mill Run School
- Camden-on-Gauley School
