= Victory High School =

High school in West Virginia, United States

Coordinates: 39.29108°N 80.35919°W

Victory High School was a public high school in Clarksburg, West Virginia, United States that operated from 1917 through 1973. This name was chosen as it was built during World War I and completed after the war was over.

== Victory High School ==
=== Colors and mascot ===
Victory's school colors were black and orange. The school's teams were known as the Victory Fighting Eagles.

A contest was conducted in 1930 to pick a mascot to go along with Victory. Joe Tipper, a student from Adamston in his junior year, won the contest. He came up with the name "Eagles." His reward was an engraved plaque bearing his name and the mascot name. The plaque was encased in one of the trophy cases in the main hallway at Victory.

State champions

=== Athletics ===
==== State Championships ====
- Boys' Basketball: 1933, 1941

Two state basketball championships were won. The first was by the 1933 team, coached by Farley Bell. The second team, coached by Howard "Doc" Hutson, won in 1941.

Victory also won football state championships in 1925 and 1935.

=== World War II ===
17 students died in the armed services during World War II.

=== Faculty ===
Full-time principals:

- Fred V. Bouic (1919–1922)
- E.A. Luzader (1922–1927)
- Arthur V.G. Upton (1927–1929)
- Henery L. Ash (1929–1937)
- Lucy M. Bailey (1937–1950)
- J. Edward Powell (1950–1966)
- Glenn E. Willis (1966–1973)

=== Closure ===
Victory High School consolidated, along with Bristol High School and Salem High School, into the new Liberty High School in 1973.

== Adamston Elementary School ==
From 1971 through 2021, the school operated as Adamston Elementary School.

=== Renovation ===
In 1998, a new bricked driveway was built in front to allow students to be dropped off and picked up in a safe environment. To cover the cost of this project, a brick wall was also established containing names of former Victory High alumni and faculty, Adamston Elementary students, and veterans. Bricks were sold from $20 to $50 and totally covered the cost of the project.

=== Closure ===
Adamston Elementary was closed after being consolidated with Wilsonburg Elementary into the newly renovated Victory Elementary (formerly Gore Middle School), located north of Clarksburg on Route 19.

== United High School ==
From 2021 to 2022, the school continued operations as United High School, an alternate high school for troubled youth. In 2022, United High School was relocated to the former Wilsonburg Elementary School.

In 2023, the building was put up for auction by the Harrison County Board of Education.

== Clarksburg Classical Academy ==
Opened in 2024, ACCEL Schools operates a tuition-free, PK-6 charter school in the former Victory High School building.
