= Nicholas County High School =

Public high school in Summersville, West Virginia

Coordinates: 38°19′18″N 80°49′50″W

Location
- 30 Grizzly Road; Summersville, West Virginia 26651; United States

Information
- School type: Public secondary
- Established: 1914
- School district: Nicholas County Schools
- Superintendent: Donna Burge-Tetrick
- Principal: Kendra Rapp
- Teaching staff: 41.25 (FTE)
- Grades: 9–12
- Enrollment: 697 (2023–2024)
- Student to teacher ratio: 16.90
- Colors: Old Gold and Navy
- Nickname: Grizzlies
- Rival: Richwood High School
- Newspaper: The Grizzly Gazette (formerly the Gold and Blue Record)
- Yearbook: The Nichlosean
- Website: https://boe.nich.k12.wv.us/o/nchs

Nicholas County High School (NCHS) is a high school located in Summersville, West Virginia. The mascot for NCHS is a grizzly bear, and its school colors are Old Gold and Old Navy. Due to a steady decline in student enrollment, the school currently ranks as an AA school, down from AAA.

As a result of flood damage to Richwood High School in June 2016, plans were made to consolidate RHS with NCHS on a new campus. The planned consolidation, however, was rejected by the West Virginia Board of Education on June 13, 2017. On June 2, 2020, the Nicholas County Board of Education broke ground on a new campus for NCHS and Summersville Middle School (which was destroyed in the flood of 2016 and had to be placed in a modular setting) at Glade Creek. The current NCHS campus will be remodeled to house Summersville Elementary School.

In 2008, Nicholas County High School was listed in the top 10% of high schools in the United States by U.S. News & World Report. NCHS was one of the few schools to be included on the list and the only school in the Nicholas County School System. In 2023, Nicholas County High School was ranked 87th within West Virginia.
