= Summers County Schools =

West Virginia school district

- 116 Main Street Hinton, West Virginia, 25951

District information
- Superintendent: David Warvel
- Schools: 4
- NCES District ID: 5401350

Students and staff
- Students: 1,361 (2021-22)
- Teachers: 100 (on an FTE basis)

Other information
- Website: https://www.scswv.us

Summers County Schools is the operating school district within Summers County, West Virginia. It operates one comprehensive secondary school, grades 6-12, and three elementary schools, grades Pre-K through 5. It is governed by the Summers County Board of Education.

== Schools ==
=== Secondary schools ===
- Summers County Comprehensive High School (6-12)

=== Elementary schools ===
- Jumping Branch Elementary School (PK-5)
- Hinton Area Elementary School (PK-5)
- Talcott Elementary School (PK-5)

=== Former schools ===
- Summers Middle
- Talcott High
- Hinton High
- Sandstone High
- Forest Hill High
- Pence Springs Grade
- Lincoln High
- Green Sulphur Grade
- Central Grade
- Meadow Creek
- Greenbrier
- Davis Grade
- Harris Grade
- Red Spring
- Lane School
