= Van Junior/Senior High School =

School in Van, West Virginia

Coordinates: 37°58′13.1″N 81°42′45.2″W

Location
- 913 Van High School Road; Van, (Boone County), West Virginia 25206; United States

Information
- Type: Public high school
- Principal: Jennifer Dent
- Staff: 14.00 (FTE)
- Grades: 6-12
- Enrollment: 152 (2023-24)
- Student to teacher ratio: 10.86
- Colors: Blue and gold
- Nickname: Bulldogs
- Website: Van Junior/Senior High School

Van High School is a combined junior and senior high school in Van, West Virginia, United States, serving the southwestern part of Boone County, West Virginia. It is within Boone County Schools.

According to the National Center for Education Statistics, as of the 2022-2023 school year, the school had 177 students. There were 14 teachers on a full-time equivalent (FTE) basis. 174 of the 177 students identified as White, while the remaining three identified as two or more races.

== Athletics ==
The Van football team had an undefeated regular season in 2022.
