= Summers County Comprehensive High School =

Coordinates: 37°42′25.2″N 80°53′18.0″W

- One Bobcat Drive; Hinton, West Virginia 25951

Information
- Type: Public
- Established: 1995
- School district: Summers County Schools
- Principal: Shawn Hawkins
- Teaching staff: 51.00 (FTE)
- Grades: 6-12
- Enrollment: 627 (2024-2025)
- Student to teacher ratio: 12.29
- Colors: Orange and black
- Mascot: Bobcat
- Website: schs.summers.k12.wv.us

Summers County Comprehensive High School is a public high school located in Hinton, West Virginia, United States along the New River in Summers County. It serves 741 students in grades 6-12.

SCCHS opened in 1995 as Summers County High School, serving grades 9-12. Students in grades 6-8 were moved into the high school building in 2020 following the closure of Summers Middle School. An expansion to the high school complex is expected to be opened in 2024 to accommodate middle school students.

Summers County is known for their Girls' Basketball program and have won 8 Championships with a record Five-time winning streak from 2007-2011. Additionally, they did not lose a game during this same period.
