= Richwood High School (West Virginia) =

Coordinates: 38°13′24.0″N 80°31′46.1″W

Location
- 1 Valley Avenue; Richwood, West Virginia 26261; United States

Information
- School type: Public Secondary
- School district: Nicholas County Schools
- Superintendent: Donna Burge-Tetrick
- Principal: Scott Williams
- Teaching staff: 18.50 (FTE)
- Grades: 9–12
- Enrollment: 322 (2023–2024)
- Student to teacher ratio: 17.41
- Colors: Orange and Black
- Nickname: Lumberjacks
- Rival: Pocahontas County High School
- Yearbook: the Lumberjack

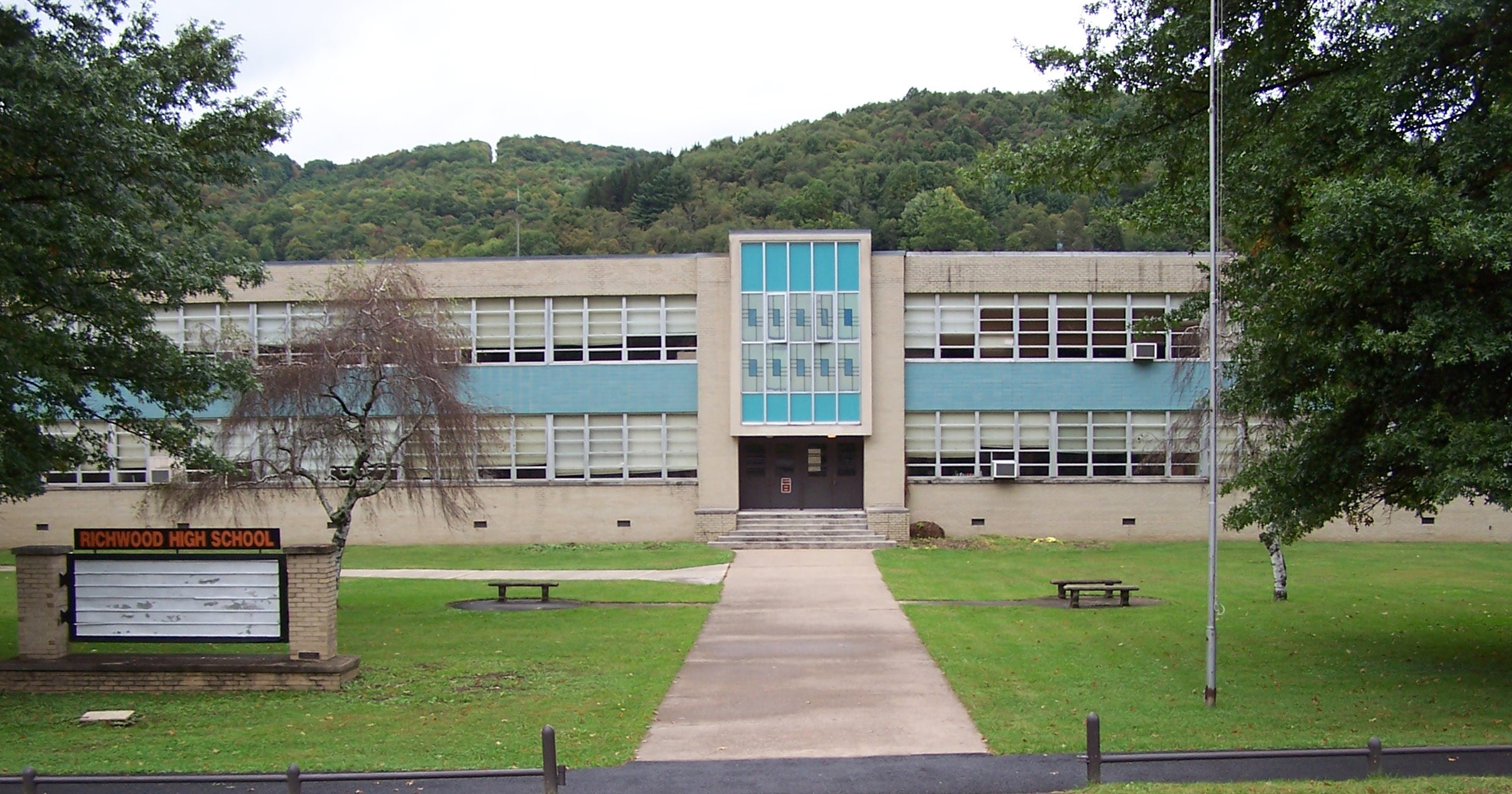
Richwood High School

Richwood High School is a public high school located in Richwood, West Virginia, United States. The school serves the eastern third of Nicholas County. During the 2016–2017 school year, Richwood High School had an enrollment of 389 students.

== Relocation and proposed consolidation ==
Due to flooding on June 23, 2016, both Richwood High School and Richwood Middle School have been temporarily relocated. Richwood High is presently housed in trailers at the former Beaver Elementary School site. On March 7, 2017, the Nicholas County Board of Education approved a plan to permanently close the schools so they can be consolidated with Nicholas County High School and Summersville Middle School on a new campus. Consolidation opponents filed an unsuccessful lawsuit against the Nicholas County Board of Education alleging open meeting laws were violated prior to the vote. On June 13, 2017, the West Virginia Board of Education rejected the proposed consolidation of the Richwood and Summersville schools. This decision was made citing the lack of alternative plans and that other options were not explored. Alternatives were presented at the meeting including comprehensive Grades 6-12 facilities in both Richwood and Summersville to reduce the overall number of schools and allow each community to maintain its autonomy.

The Nicholas County Board of Education sued the West Virginia Board of Education over its denial of the county's school consolidation plans, arguing that the county had met the requirements documented in WVBOE policies and that the state board was being arbitrary in its denial. Nicholas County initially won its case at the circuit court level, but on appeal, the West Virginia Supreme Court of Appeals ruled on October 10, 2017, that the state board has the discretion to reject plans it believes are not in the public's best interest.

On June 2, 2020, groundbreaking ceremonies were held for the new Richwood High School and Richwood Middle School, which will be built onto a heavily remodeled Cherry River Elementary.

== Mascot and colors ==
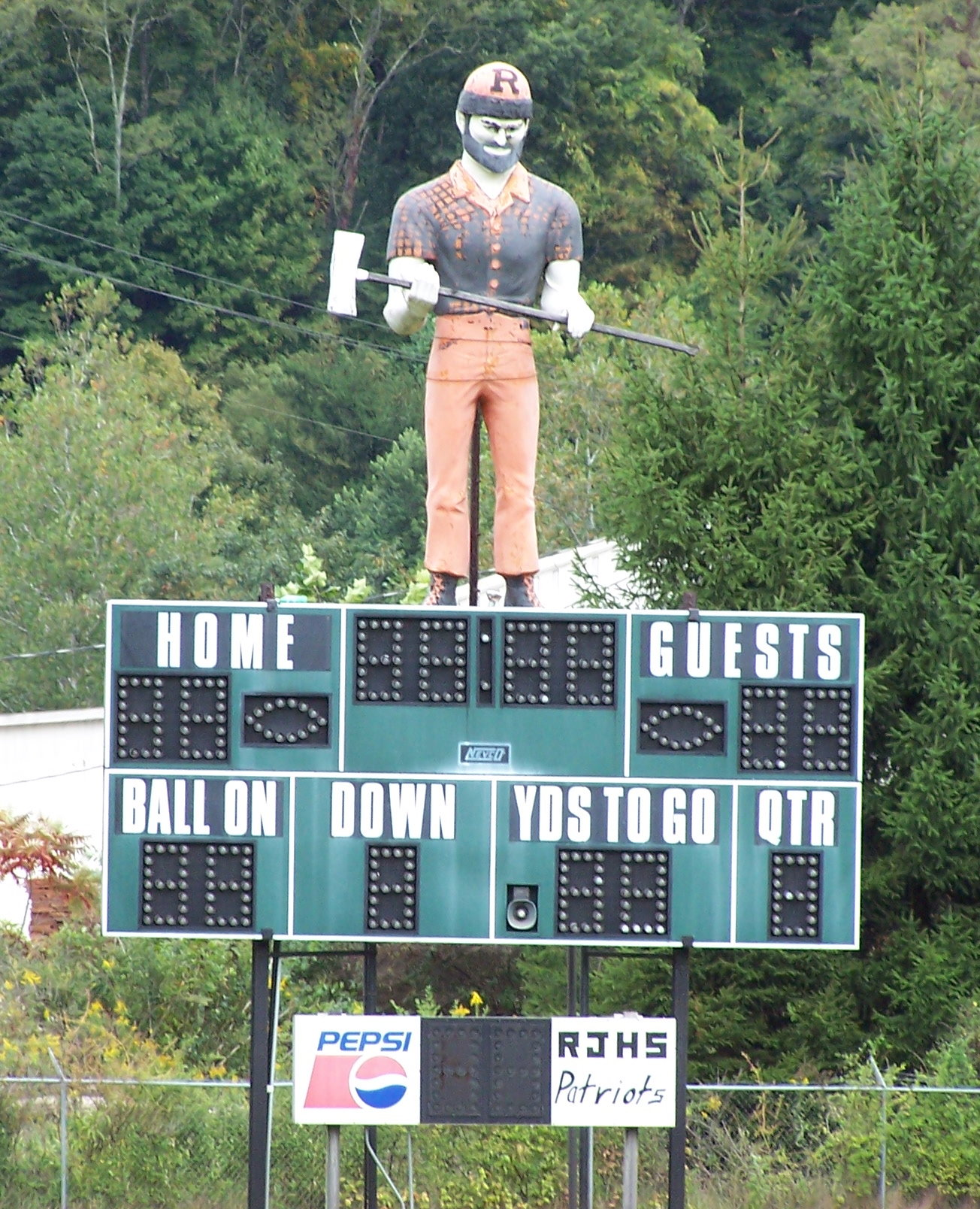
The scoreboard at Dean Memorial Field is topped with a statue of a lumberjack, the school's mascot.

The school's mascot is the lumberjack and the school colors are orange and black.

== Extracurricular activities ==
=== Sports ===
Richwood High School fields several sports teams at the Class A level.

- Boys - baseball, basketball, cross country, football, golf, track, and wrestling.
- Girls - basketball, cheerleading, cross country, golf, softball, track, volleyball, and wrestling.

In 2005, the R.H.S. Ladyjacks softball team won the school's first team state championship in any sport. Additionally, other sports teams at the school have won multiple sectional and regional championships and the school's track team has also held two state records. Also in 2015, the Richwood Ladyjacks made it to the West Virginia state championship.

=== Marching band ===
Richwood High School is also home to the Lumberjack Express Band. The band has made many appearances in parades, festivals, and events throughout the United States and Canada. The members have performed at Walt Disney World, Niagara Falls, Ontario, the Kentucky Derby, the Coca-Cola 600, the Indianapolis 500, and the Shenandoah Apple Blossom Festival in Winchester, Virginia, to name a few. The band has been featured on regional and national television during these events, where they have also won numerous awards. Also, the Richwood band has performed in many large stadiums, presenting pre-game shows for the Atlanta Braves, Cincinnati Reds, Philadelphia Phillies, Washington Nationals, and Pittsburgh Pirates. The band has also received Superior ratings for its marching and concert performances at the West Virginia Secondary Schools Activities Commission's regional band festival. The band is under the direction of Greg James.

== See also ==
- List of high schools in West Virginia
- Education in West Virginia
