= Pendleton County Schools =

School district in Pendleton County, West Virginia

Location
- Franklin, West Virginia; United States

District information
- Type: Public School District
- Superintendent: Nicole Hevener

Other information
- Website: https://www.pendletoncountyschools.com

Pendleton County Schools is the operating school district within Pendleton County, West Virginia. It is governed by the Pendleton County Board of Education.

== Schools ==
=== Secondary schools ===
- Pendleton County Middle/High School

=== Elementary schools ===
- Brandywine Elementary School
- Franklin Elementary School
- North Fork Elementary School

== Former schools ==
- Circleville School
- Franklin High School
- Seneca Rocks Elementary School
- Upper Tract Elementary School
