= Nicholas County Schools =

West Virginia school district

Address
- 400 Old Main Drive Summersville, West Virginia 26651; United States

District information
- Type: Public School District
- Superintendent: Scott Cochran

Other information
- Website: boe.nich.k12.wv.us

Nicholas County Schools is a school district serving Nicholas County, West Virginia. Its main office is in Summersville, West Virginia

== Board of education ==
Nicholas County Schools is under the direction of the Nicholas County Board of Education, made up of the following members:

- Chip Perrine, President
- Roy Moose, Vice President
- Rick Green
- Freddie Seabolt

== Schools ==
=== High schools ===
- Nicholas County High School, Summersville
- Richwood High School, Richwood

=== Middle schools ===
- Summersville Middle School, Summersville
- Richwood Middle School, Richwood

=== Elementary schools ===
- Birch River Elementary, Birch River
- Cherry River Elementary, Richwood
- Gauley River Elementary, Craigsville
- Glade Creek Elementary, Summersville
- Mount Lookout Elementary, Mount Lookout
- Mount Nebo Elementary, Mount Nebo
- Panther Creek Elementary, Nettie
- Summersville Elementary School, Summersville
- Zela Elementary School, Zela

=== Vocational Schools ===
- Nicholas County Career and Technical Center, Craigsville

=== Alternative schools ===
- Nicholas County Learning Center and Cadet Leadership Academy, Summersville

=== Former Schools ===
- Beaver Elementary School
- Craigsville Elementary School
- Dixie Elementary School
- Summersville Junior High School
- Richwood Junior High School
