= Gilmer County Schools =

School district in West Virginia, United States

Location
- Glenville, West Virginia Gilmer County, West Virginia United States

District information
- Type: Public School District
- Superintendent: Dr. Tony Minney
- NCES District ID: 5400330

Students and staff
- Students: 800
- Student–teacher ratio: 11.76:1

Other information
- Website: boe.gilmer.k12.wv.us

Gilmer County Schools is the operating school district within Gilmer County, West Virginia. It is governed by the Gilmer County Board of Education. Gilmer County Schools operates one elementary school, which serves students through grade 5, and one high school, which serves students in grades 6-12.

== Board of education ==
The Gilmer County Board of Education is made up of the following members:

- Cody Moore, President
- Dustin Freshour, Vice-President
- Brett Chapman, Member
- Hilary Miller, Member
- Jason Barr, Member

== Schools ==
=== Secondary School ===
- Gilmer County High School, Glenville

=== Elementary School ===
- Gilmer County Elementary School, Glenville

=== Vocational School ===
- Calhoun-Gilmer Career Center (jointly operated by Gilmer and Calhoun County Schools)
