= Berkeley Springs High School =

Coordinates: 39.617693°N 78.232720°W

- 149 Concord Ave Berkeley Springs, WV

Information
- Type: Public high school
- Established: 1913
- School district: Morgan County Schools
- Principal: Mitch Nida
- Teaching staff: 38.00 (FTE)
- Grades: 9-12
- Enrollment: 582 (2024–2025)
- Student to teacher ratio: 15.32
- Campus: Open
- Colors: Blue, gold, and white
- Mascot: Indian
- Yearbook: The Arrowhead
- Website: https://www.morganschools.net/o/bshs

Berkeley Springs High School is an American public, co-educational high school located in Berkeley Springs, West Virginia. It teaches 9th through 12th grade and currently has about 747 students in attendance.

== History ==
Berkeley Springs High School was founded in 1913 in the town of Berkeley Springs, which is the seat of Morgan County, West Virginia. Originally located at 187 South Green Street and named Bath District High School, the school moved to its current campus in the Berryville neighborhood in 1939. The 1939 building is now called the Main Building, or Building A.

In 1963, a junior high school was built next to the high school building. When Warm Springs Middle School was built and the junior high school closed in 1998, it became the high school's Arts and Humanities Building (Building B). It now holds the school's Social Studies, art, and special education classrooms.

In the mid-70's, a new athletic building (Building C) was constructed next to Building B and diagonal to Building A. A kitchen was added to one side of the Building A and the old gymnasium became the cafeteria. Building C now has the gymnasium, athletic offices and training rooms, weightlifting room, band room, choir room, and dance room.

In 1985, the Vocational Building (Building D) was built on the hill between buildings B and C and Highway 522. This part of the school contains health, cooking and agriculture classes, an extra media center, a long-distance learning room, and an alternative education room.

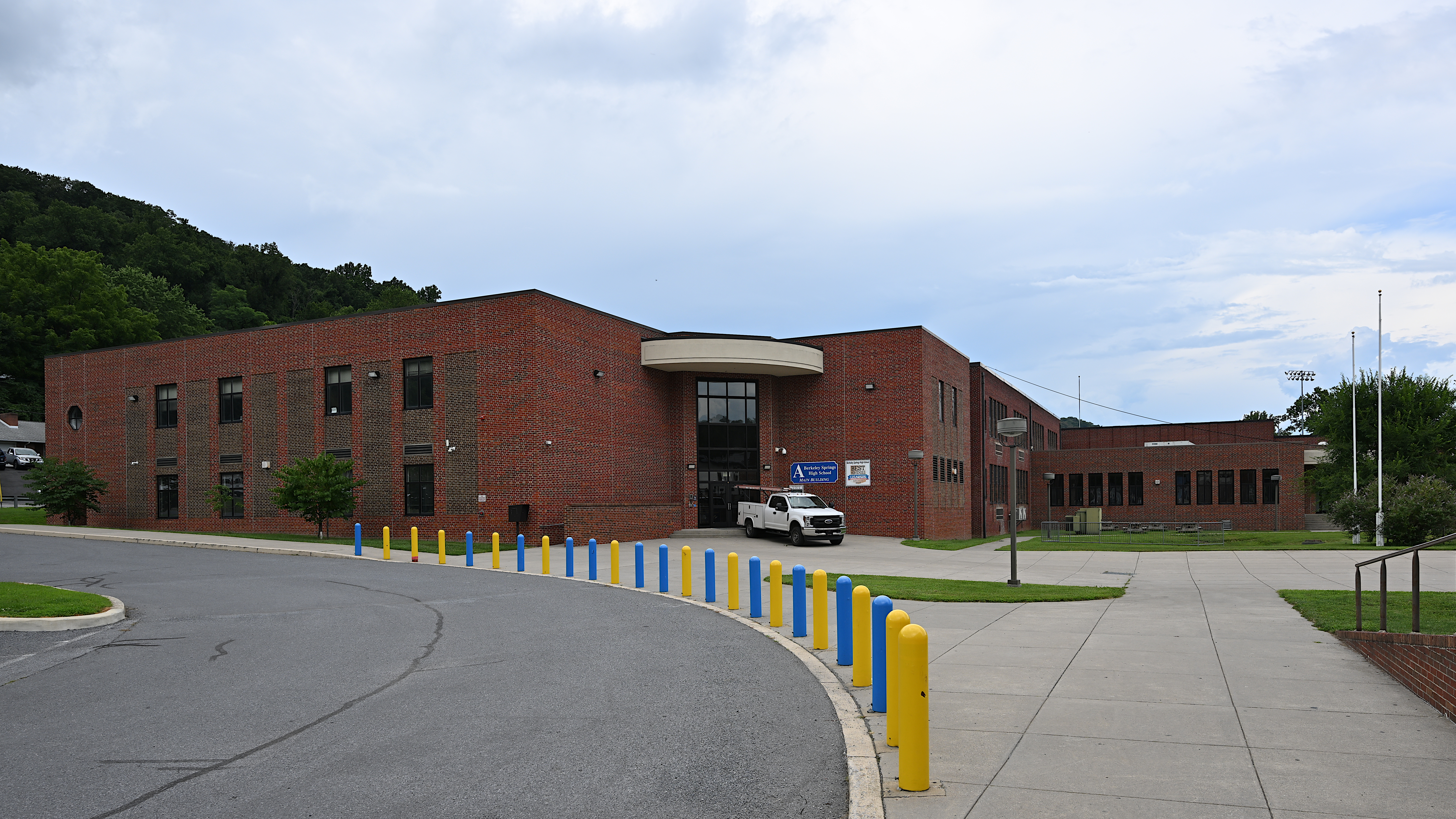
Berkeley Springs High School main building

In 2002, multiple additions were added and renovations performed on Building A, more than doubling its size. The most prominent addition is the new main office, library/media center, and conference rooms on the first floor and four science classrooms and a teachers' lounge on the second floor. Dressing rooms and a prop room were added to the back of the auditorium, and an extra cafeteria room was added. The school's front entrance was moved to the opposite side of the building, giving it a more central position among the four buildings. The first floor girls' restroom was moved to the location of the original reception desk, making room for a hallway to the new cafeteria room. Old windows were replaced and HVAC was installed throughout the building.

In 2007, an addition was added to the south side of Building D, adding two Spanish classrooms, two extra science classrooms, and a driver's education classroom.

In May 2013, the Morgan County Schools' excess tax levy was voted down by the citizens of Morgan County, and several programs at Berkeley Springs High School, including driver's education, alternative education, Advanced Placement history, and Psychology were planned to be stopped starting in the 2014-2015 school year. However, the school board held a new vote in May 2014 for a new levy rate at 70% of the original, and it was voted up, allowing these programs to continue.

In Autumn 2015, the Boys and Girls cross country teams both became A-AA state champions.

== Organizations and athletics ==
=== Sports ===
- Football
- Soccer
- Wrestling
- Cheerleading
- Baseball
- Softball
- Cross Country
- Track and Field
- Golf
- Fishing
- Tennis
- Basketball (Girls and Boys)

=== Arts ===
- Marching band
- Concert Band
- Show Choir
- Concert Choir
- Dance
- Jazz Band
- Guitar
- Piano
- General Art
- Sculpture
- Studio Art
- Music Theory
- Music Appreciation
- Theater

=== Clubs and activities ===
- FCCLA (Family, Career, and Community Leaders of America)
- FFA (Future Farmers of America)
- National Honor Society
- Color Guard
- Book Club
- Chess Club
- Anime Club

Note: These lists may not be complete.
