= Clay County Schools (West Virginia) =

School district in West Virginia

Location
- Clay, West Virginia Clay County, West Virginia United States

District information
- Type: Public School District
- Superintendent: Philip Dobbins

Other information
- Website: www.claycountyschools.org

Clay County Schools is the operating school district for Clay County, West Virginia. The board office is located in the town of Clay.

== Board of education ==
The Clay County Board of Education is placed in charge of school affairs for Clay County, consisting of the following elected members:

- Dave Mullins, President
- David Pierson, Vice President
- Morgan Triplett
- Susan Bodkins
- Cheryl White

== Schools ==
=== High schools ===
- Clay County High School, Clay

=== Middle schools ===
- Clay County Middle School, Clay

=== Elementary schools ===
- Clay Elementary School, Clay
- Lizemore Elementary School, Lizemore
- H.E White Elementary, Bomont
- Big Otter Elementary, Duck

=== Former Schools ===
- Ivydale Elementary School
- Valley Fork Elementary
