= River View High School (West Virginia) =

Location
- 512 Mountaineer Highway; Bradshaw, West Virginia 24817; United States
- 37°21′29″N 81°48′07″W

Information
- School type: Public, high school
- Established: 2009
- School district: McDowell County Schools
- Superintendent: Dr. Ingrida Barker
- Principal: Frazier McGuire
- Teaching staff: 20.50 (FTE)
- Grades: 9 - 12
- Enrollment: 397 (2023-2024)
- Student to teacher ratio: 19.37
- Colors: Purple; Black; Silver
- Nickname: Raiders
- Rivals: Mount View High School; Westside High School
- Communities served: Iaeger, Bradshaw, War
- Website: boe.mcdo.k12.wv.us/o/rvhs

River View High School (RVHS) is a public high school in Bradshaw, West Virginia. The school is located on the grounds of the old Bradshaw Junior High School, in the mountains of McDowell County, West Virginia. It is one of two high schools in the county, with the other being Mount View High School. Opening in 2010, the school serves grades 9-12. River View High School's colors are purple, black, and silver. The school's sports teams are called the Raiders.
