= Morgan County Schools (West Virginia) =

School district in West Virginia, USA

Morgan County Schools is the operating school district within Morgan County, West Virginia. It is governed by the Morgan County Board of Education.

== Schools ==
=== High schools ===
- Berkeley Springs High School
- Paw Paw High School

=== Middle schools ===
- Warm Springs Middle School

=== Intermediate schools ===
- Warm Springs Intermediate School

=== Elementary schools ===
- Paw Paw Elementary School
- Pleasant View Elementary School
- Widmyer Elementary School

== Schools no longer in operation ==
- Great Cacapon Elementary School
- Greenwood Elementary School
- Magnolia School
- North Berkeley Primary School
