= Chapmanville Regional High School =

Public high school in Chapmanville, West Virginia, United States

Coordinates: 37.977278°N 82.026501°W

Location
- 200 Vance Street; Chapmanville, (Logan County), West Virginia 25508; United States

Information
- Type: Public high school
- Principal: Rob Dial
- Staff: 41.50 (FTE)
- Enrollment: 645 (2024-2025)
- Student to teacher ratio: 15.54
- Colors: Orange; Black
- Mascot: Tiger

Chapmanville Regional High School is West Virginia's first cross-county consolidated high school, combining students from Chapmanville High School in Logan County with students from Harts High School in Lincoln County. CRHS is located in Chapmanville. It is operated by Logan County Schools, but funded by both counties. The school hosts roughly 600 students in a given academic year.

Since the merger, CRHS has enjoyed success in football, baseball, and basketball and is a member of the West Virginia Class AAA sports division.

The CRHS baseball team went 35-3 and won the Class AA state championship in 2011 marking it the first state championship for Chapmanville Regional High School.

On March 17, 2018, the CRHS boys basketball team defeated the Polar Bears of Fairmont Senior High School by a score of 69 to 60 to take home their first ever state championship.

On March 16, 2019, The CRHS boys basketball team repeated as WV Class AA State Champs by defeating the Fairmont Senior High School Polar Bears 60-46.

On March 21, 2026, the CRHS Boys Basketball team won their first Class AAA championship by defeating North Marion 71-67.

On November 9th, 2024, the CRHS Cheerleaders won the first AAA Region IV Championship in school history and the first Regional Championship since 1994.

In December of 2025, the CRHS Cheerleaders got the first BID to UCA High School Nationals in school history. They continued to go compete in UCA Nationals in January 2026.

== Notable alumni ==
- Obinna Anochili-Killen, Marshall University Basketball Player
