= Scott High School (West Virginia) =

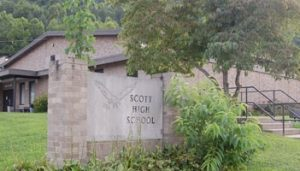
- Scott High School Sign in 2018.

Location
- 1 Skyhawk Place; Madison, Boone, West Virginia 25130; United States

Information
- School type: Public High School
- Motto: All In Everyday
- Established: 1911
- School board: Boone County Board of Education
- Principal: Amy Hale
- Teaching staff: 32.00 (FTE)
- Grades: 9-12
- Enrollment: 562 (2023-2024)
- Student to teacher ratio: 17.56
- Schedule type: 7 periods
- Colors: Black; Vegas Gold
- Fight song: Hail West Virginia
- Mascot: SkyHawk
- Rival: Logan High School
- Yearbook: Scottonian
- Website: http://scotthighskyhawks.com/

Scott High School is a four year high school serving the town of Madison, West Virginia and the rest of northern Boone County.

== History ==
Scott District High School was the first high school in Boone County. Named after its location of the Scott District, it opened in the Fall of 1911 in an old wood-frame building in Danville, West Virginia.

In 1924, Scott High School moved to a new West Madison, West Virginia building. Scott High School is located at 1 Skyhawk Place, Madison, WV 25130.

== Student body ==
Scott High, with an enrollment of 529, is ranked 55th in student population within West Virginia. The population is 54% male. The school is 99.1% White, .08% Black, and .02% Asian.

== Notable alumni ==
- Kenneth Keller Hall, judge
