= Davy, West Virginia =

- Town
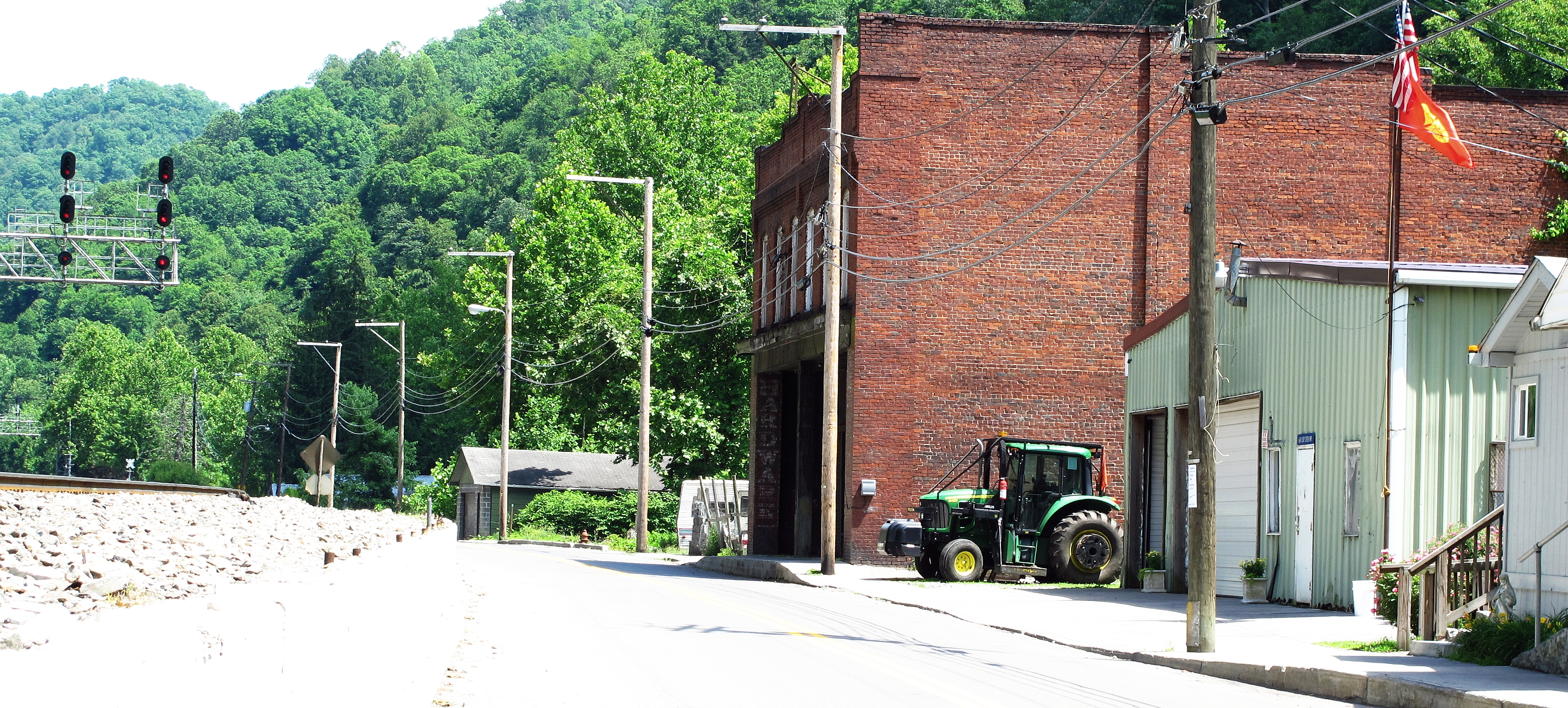
- Main Street in Davy

- Location of Davy in McDowell County, West Virginia.
- Coordinates: 37°28′47″N 81°39′0″W
- Country: United States
- State: West Virginia
- County: McDowell

Area
  - Total: 1.29 sq mi (3.35 km^{2})
  - Land: 1.27 sq mi (3.30 km^{2})
  - Water: 0.023 sq mi (0.06 km^{2})
- Elevation: 1,184 ft (361 m)

Population (2020)
  - Total: 209
  - Estimate (2019): 337
  - Density: 264.7/sq mi (102.21/km^{2})
- Time zone: UTC-5 (Eastern (EST))
  - Summer (DST): UTC-4 (EDT)
- ZIP code: 24828
- Area code: 304
- FIPS code: 54-20500
- GNIS feature ID: 1538061

Davy is a town in McDowell County, West Virginia, United States. The population was 209 at the 2020 census, down from 420 at the 2010 census. Founded in 1873, the town was originally called Hallsville but the name would change to Davy by 1901. Davy was officially incorporated in 1948. It is a mostly residential community in a coal mining district along the main line of the Norfolk Southern Railway.

== Geography ==
According to the United States Census Bureau, the town has a total area of 1.29 square miles (3.34 km^{2}), of which 1.27 square miles (3.29 km^{2}) is land and 0.02 square miles (0.05 km^{2}) is water.

== Demographics ==
Historical population
Census	Pop.	Note	%±
1950	1,650		—
1960	1,331		−19.3%
1970	993		−25.4%
1980	882		−11.2%
1990	403		−54.3%
2000	373		−7.4%
2010	420		12.6%
2020	209		−50.2%
U.S. Decennial Census

=== 2010 census ===
At the 2010 census there were 420 people, 167 households, and 123 families living in the town. The population density was 330.7 inhabitants per square mile (127.7/km^{2}). There were 192 housing units at an average density of 151.2 per square mile (58.4/km^{2}). The racial makeup of the town was 96.7% White, 2.6% African American, 0.2% Native American, and 0.5% from two or more races. Of the 167 households 33.5% had children under the age of 18 living with them, 51.5% were married couples living together, 14.4% had a female householder with no husband present, 7.8% had a male householder with no wife present, and 26.3% were non-families. 24.6% of households were one person and 12.6% were one person aged 65 or older. The average household size was 2.51 and the average family size was 2.94.

The median age in the town was 40 years. 22.6% of residents were under the age of 18; 8.8% were between the ages of 18 and 24; 27.2% were from 25 to 44; 26.7% were from 45 to 64; and 14.8% were 65 or older. The gender makeup of the town was 51.4% male and 48.6% female.

=== 2000 census ===
At the 2000 census there were 373 people, 137 households, and 106 families living in the town. The population density was 288.8 inhabitants per square mile (111.5/km^{2}). There were 170 housing units at an average density of 131.6 per square mile (50.8/km^{2}). The racial makeup of the town was 99.73% White and 0.27% Pacific Islander. Of the 137 households 29.9% had children under the age of 18 living with them, 59.1% were married couples living together, 13.1% had a female householder with no husband present, and 22.6% were non-families. 21.2% of households were one person and 10.2% were one person aged 65 or older. The average household size was 2.72 and the average family size was 3.13.

The age distribution was 23.9% under the age of 18, 8.8% from 18 to 24, 28.7% from 25 to 44, 26.8% from 45 to 64, and 11.8% 65 or older. The median age was 37 years. For every 100 females, there were 90.3 males. For every 100 females age 18 and over, there were 85.6 males.

The median household income was $16,250 and the median family income was $23,000. Males had a median income of $15,417 versus $13,750 for females. The per capita income for the town was $8,116. About 37.3% of families and 41.8% of the population were below the poverty line, including 60.0% of those under age 18 and 15.4% of those age 65 or over.
