= Upperglade, West Virginia =

- Unincorporated community
- Location within West Virginia Location within the United States
- Coordinates: 38°24′33″N 80°30′24″W
- Country: United States
- State: West Virginia
- County: Webster
- Elevation: 2,329 ft (710 m)
- Time zone: UTC-5 (Eastern (EST))
  - Summer (DST): UTC-4 (EDT)
- ZIP code: 26266
- Area codes: 304 & 681
- GNIS feature ID: 1553322

Upperglade is an unincorporated community in Webster County, West Virginia, United States. Upperglade is located on West Virginia Route 20, 3 miles (4.8 km) east of Cowen. Upperglade has a post office with ZIP code 26266.
