= Bradshaw, West Virginia =

Town in West Virginia, United States

Bradshaw
- Town
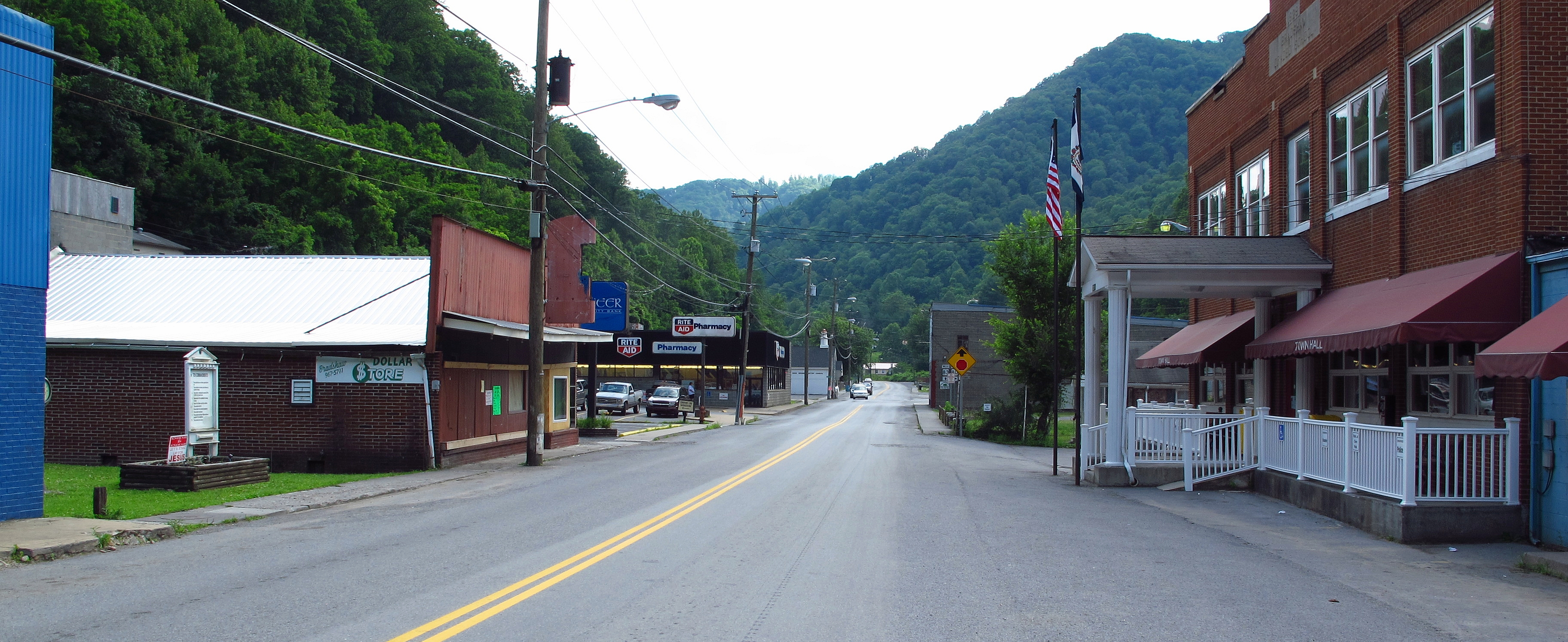
- Bartley Store Bottom Road in Bradshaw

- Seal

- Location of Bradshaw in McDowell County, West Virginia.

- Location within the state of West Virginia
- Coordinates: 37°21′6″N 81°47′57″W
- Country: United States
- State: West Virginia
- County: McDowell

Area
  - Total: 0.80 sq mi (2.07 km^{2})
  - Land: 0.77 sq mi (2.00 km^{2})
  - Water: 0.027 sq mi (0.07 km^{2})

Population (2020)
  - Total: 207
  - Density: 350.2/sq mi (135.22/km^{2})
- Time zone: UTC-5 (Eastern (EST))
  - Summer (DST): UTC-4 (EDT)
- ZIP codes: 24817
- FIPS code: 54-09700
- GNIS feature ID: 2390746

Bradshaw is a town in McDowell County, West Virginia, United States. The population was 207 at the 2020 census. Bradshaw was incorporated in December 1979 and named for a pioneer settler.

== Geography ==
According to the United States Census Bureau, the town has a total area of 0.80 square miles (2.07 km^{2}), of which 0.77 square miles (1.99 km^{2}) is land and 0.03 square miles (0.08 km^{2}) is water.

Bradshaw is on the Sandy River and is serviced by the Norfolk Southern Railway (former Norfolk and Western) network. The town has River View High School (West Virginia) one of only two high schools in the County.

== Demographics ==
Historical population
| Census | Pop. | Note | %± |
|---|---|---|---|
| 1990 | 394 | | — |
| 2000 | 289 | | −26.6% |
| 2010 | 337 | | 16.6% |
| 2020 | 207 | | −38.6% |
U.S. Decennial Census

The median income for a household in the town was $12,083, and the median income for a family was $14,750. Males had a median income of $35,625 versus $25,625 for females. The per capita income for the town was $9,458. About 43.7% of families and 54.9% of the population were below the poverty line, including 87.5% of those under the age of eighteen and 31.0% of those 65 or over.

=== 2010 census ===
As of the census of 2010, Mayor Lawrence Crigger there were 337 people, 131 households, and 97 families living in the town. The population density was 437.7 inhabitants per square mile (169.0/km^{2}). There were 166 housing units at an average density of 215.6 per square mile (83.2/km^{2}). The racial makeup of the town was 98.5% White, 0.6% African American, 0.3% Native American, and 0.6% from two or more races.

There were 131 households, of which 38.9% had children under the age of 18 living with them, 52.7% were married couples living together, 17.6% had a female householder with no husband present, 3.8% had a male householder with no wife present, and 26.0% were non-families. 23.7% of all households were made up of individuals, and 11.4% had someone living alone who was 65 years of age or older. The average household size was 2.57 and the average family size was 2.98.

The median age in the town was 40.6 years. 25.8% of residents were under the age of 18; 8.9% were between the ages of 18 and 24; 21.9% were from 25 to 44; 30.2% were from 45 to 64; and 13.1% were 65 years of age or older. The gender makeup of the town was 49.0% male and 51.0% female.
