= Harrison County Schools =

School district in West Virginia

Address
- 445 West Main Street Clarksburg, Harrison, West Virginia, 26301; United States

District information
- Type: Public
- Motto: Where all are leaders and all are learners
- Grades: K-12
- Superintendent: Dora Stutler
- Asst. superintendent(s): James Lopez
- School board: Frank Devono Jr., President; Mary Frances Smith, Vice President; Douglas Hogue; William "Tom" Tucker; Dr. Jenny Santilli

Other information
- Website: www.harcoboe.net

Harrison County Schools is the operating school district within Harrison County, West Virginia. It is governed by the Harrison County Board of Education and serves over 11,200 students in Harrison County.

== Schools ==
=== High schools ===
- Bridgeport High School
- Lincoln High School
- Robert C. Byrd High School
- South Harrison High School (West Virginia)
- United High School

=== Middle schools ===
- Bridgeport Middle School
- Liberty Middle School
- Lincoln Middle School
- South Harrison Middle School

=== Elementary schools ===
- Big Elm Elementary School
- Johnson Elementary School
- Lost Creek Elementary School
- Lumberport Elementary School
- Mountaineer Elementary School
- Nutter Fort Primary
- Nutter Fort Intermediate
- Salem Elementary School
- Simpson Elementary School
- Victory Elementary School
- West Milford Elementary School

=== Technical schools ===
- United Technical Center

== Former Schools ==
- Adamston Elementary School
- Alta Vista Elementary School (Clarksburg)
- Anmoore
- Bethany Elementary School (Brown)
- Bridgeport Jr. High School
- Bristol High School
- Broadway (Clarksburg)
- Carlisle (Clarksburg)
- Central Jr. High School (Clarksburg)
- Clarksburg High School
- East View Elementary School
- Enterprise Elementary School
- Gore Jr. High [Middle] School
- Harden Elementary School (Salem)
- Jacobs Public School (Nutter Fort)
- Kelly Miller High School (Clarksburg)
- Liberty Elementary School
- Liberty High School
- Linden Elementary School (Clarksburg)
- Lost Creek High School
- Lumberport High [Jr. High, Middle] School
- Morgan Elementary School (Clarksburg)
- Mountaineer Middle School (Clarksburg)
- North View Elementary School (Clarksburg)
- Norwood Elementary School (Stonewood)
- Pierpont (Clarksburg)
- Point Comfort Elementary School (Clarksburg)
- Reynoldsville Elementary School
- Roosevelt-Wilson High [Jr. High, Middle] School (Nutter Fort)
- Salem High School
- Salem Jr. High [Middle] School
- Sardis High [Elementary] School
- Shinnston High [Jr. High, Elementary] School
- Summit Park Elementary School
- Towers Elementary School (Clarksburg)
- Van Horn Elementary School (Salem)
- Victory High School (Clarksburg)
- Washington Irving High [Middle] School (Clarksburg)
- Wallace High [Elementary] School
- Wilsonburg Elementary School
- Wyatt High [Elementary] School
