= East Hardy High School =

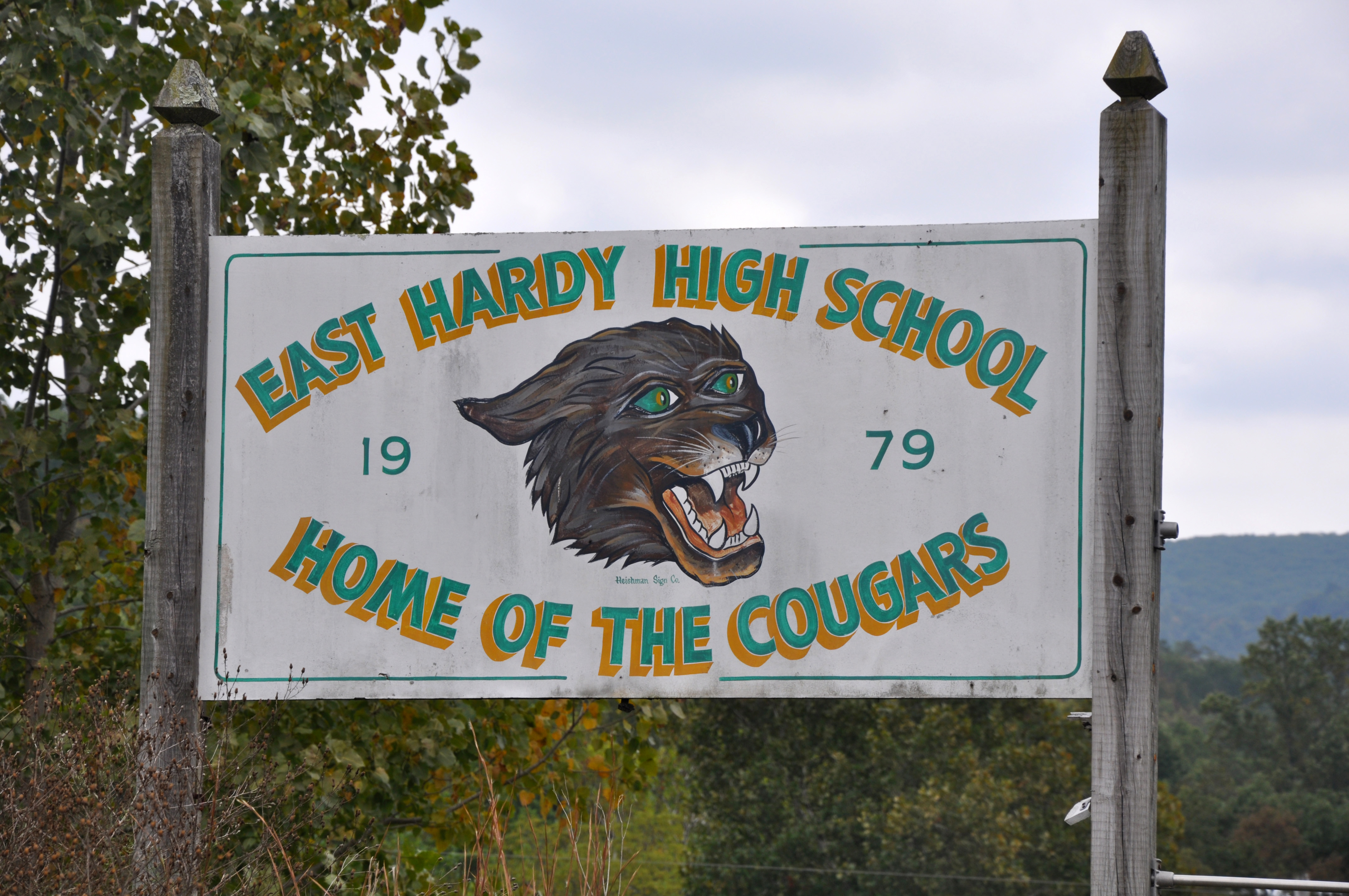

Location
- 259 Cougar Drive; Baker, Hardy County, West Virginia 26801; United States
- Coordinates: 39°2′48″N 78°45′36″W

Information
- School type: Public
- School board: Hardy County Schools
- Principal: Derick Parks
- Grades: 9-12
- Enrollment: 306 (2023-2024)
- Student to teacher ratio: 12 to 1
- Language: English
- Colors: Kelly Green and Sting Yellow
- Mascot: Cougar
- Website: www.hardycountyschools.com/o/east-hardy-hs

East Hardy High School is a high school located in Baker, West Virginia. It was established in the late 1970s after the consolidation of two K-12 schools in Eastern Hardy County: Mathias School and Wardensville School. The school's mascot is the Cougar. The school was listed in the U.S. News & World Report top high schools in the United States every year from 2008 to 2012.

== See also ==
- Hardy County Schools

East Hardy started as a Vo-tech school that was built in the early 1970s. It did not become a high school until 1979 when Mathias High School and Wardensville High School consolidated. It was recognized as a WV school of excellence and has met AYP the last couple years.
