= McDowell County Schools =

School district in West Virginia

Location
- Welch, West Virginia United States

District information
- Type: Public School District
- Motto: Doing what is best for students, no matter what.
- Superintendent: Dr. Ingrida Barker

Students and staff
- Students: 2,825

Other information
- Website: boe.mcdo.k12.wv.us

McDowell County Schools is the operating school district within McDowell County, West Virginia. It is governed by the McDowell County Board of Education.

The school district covers the entire county.

== Board of education ==
The School Board is made up of five members, each elected to a four-year term in a nonpartisan election. The board also appoints the superintendent. Current members:

Member	Position
Georgia West	President
Angela Robinette	Vice President
Margaret Beavers	Member
Ed Evans	Member
Larkin Rippeth	Member

Dr. Ingrida Barker is the superintendent.

== Unions ==
AFT-McDowell Local 4906 is the locally chartered union of the American Federation of Teachers. AFT-McDowell represents only teachers in McDowell County. AFT-McDowell is a local affiliate of AFT-West Virginia. All AFT local unions are affiliated with the National and WV AFL-CIO

Two unions represent service personnel employed by McDowell County Schools. The Paraprofessional and School-Related Personnel (PSRP) division of the American Federation of Teachers, AFL-CIO and The West Virginia School Service Personnel (WVSSPA). School service personnel include non-administrative office employees, aides, custodians, transportation, maintenance, and school meal providers.

The McDowell County Education Association (MCEA) is an association of school administrators and teachers for this school district. Gwen Lacy is the President. It is a local affiliate of the West Virginia Education Association.

== Schools ==
=== High schools ===
- Mount View High School
- River View High School

=== K-8 schools ===
- Southside K–8 School

=== Middle schools ===
- Mount View Middle School (shares a campus with the high school, but has its own office and administration.)
- Sandy River Middle School

=== Elementary schools ===
- Bradshaw Elementary School
- Fall River Elementary School
- Iaeger Elementary School
- Kimball Elementary School
- Welch Elementary School

=== Career training centers ===
- McDowell County Adult Learning Center
- McDowell County Vocational Technical Center

== Schools no longer in operation ==
=== High schools ===
- Big Creek High School
- Elkorn High School
- Excelsior High School
- Gary High School
- Iaeger High School
- Kimball High School
- Northfork-Elkhorn High School
- Northfork High School
- Welch High School

=== Junior high schools ===
- Anawalt Junior High School
- Berwind Junior High School
- Bradshaw Junior High School
- Coalwood Junior High
- Davy Junior High
- Hemphill-Capels Junior High
- Keystone Junior High School
- Kimball Junior High School
- Northfork Middle School
- War Junior High School
- Welch Middle School

=== Elementary schools ===
- Anawalt Elementary School
- Asco Grade School
- Bartley Elementary School
- Berwind Elementary School
- Caretta Elementary School
- Davy Elementary School
- Eckman Elementary School
- Gary Elementary School
- Hemphill Elementary School
- Jolo Elementary School
- Keystone Elementary School
- Mohegan Elementary School
- Panther Elementary School
- Roderfield Grade School
- Superior-Maitland Grade School
- Switchback Elementary School
- War Elementary School
