= Grant County Schools =

School district in West Virginia, United States

Grant County Schools is the operating school district within Grant County, in the U.S. state of West Virginia. It is governed by the Grant County Board of Education.

== Schools ==
The following schools are in Grant County Schools:

=== High schools ===
- Petersburg High School
- South Branch Career & Technical Center

=== Elementary schools ===
- Maysville Elementary School
- Petersburg Elementary School

=== K-12 schools ===
- Union Educational Complex

== Schools no longer in operation ==
- Bayard Grade School
- Bayard High School
- Dorcas Elementary School
