= Monroe County Schools (West Virginia) =

School district in West Virginia, United States

Monroe County Schools is the operating school district within Monroe County, West Virginia. It is governed by the Monroe County Board of Education. The district central office is located in Union. The district serves approximately 1,600 students in grades Pre-K through 12. Dr. Joetta Basile serves as the superintendent.

== Schools ==
=== High schools ===
- James Monroe High School
- Monroe County Vocational/Technical Center

=== Middle schools ===
- Mountain View Elementary & Middle School
- Peterstown Middle School

=== Elementary schools ===
- Peterstown Elementary School
