= Liberty High School (Clarksburg, West Virginia) =

Location
- 1 Mountaineer Drive; Clarksburg, Harrison County, West Virginia 26301; United States; 39°16′33″N 80°23′51″W

Information
- School district: Harrison County Schools
- Superintendent: Dora Stutler
- Principal: Robert Herrod
- Assistant Principal: Dave Mazza
- Teaching staff: 34.76 (FTE)
- Grades: 9-12
- Enrollment: 346 (2024-2025)
- Student to teacher ratio: 9.95
- Colors: Red, white and blue
- Athletics conference: Big Ten
- Nickname: Mountaineers
- Website: harcoboe.com/LibertyHighSchool

Liberty High School was a comprehensive four-year public high school located in Clarksburg, West Virginia, in Harrison County, West Virginia, United States, that operated as part of the Harrison County School District. The school was located on Davisson Run Road. The school opened in 1973 after Bristol High, Salem High and Victory High schools consolidated into Liberty High School and its colors are red, white, and blue. The school mascot was the Mountaineer.

Beginning with the 2025–2026 academic school year, students who attended Liberty High School began attending Robert C. Byrd High School and students from Mountaineer Middle and Washington Irving Middle began attending the new Liberty Middle School, housed in the former Liberty High building.

== Notable alumni ==
- Mike Carey (born 1958), basketball coach
- Jimbo Fisher (born 1965), football coach

== Athletics ==
Liberty High competed in team and individual competitions sanctioned by the West Virginia Secondary School Activities Commission and competed regionally in the (WV) Big Ten Conference.

=== State Championships ===
- Baseball: 1999
- Cheerleading: 2004, 2008, 2010
