= Iaeger, West Virginia =

Iaeger
- Town
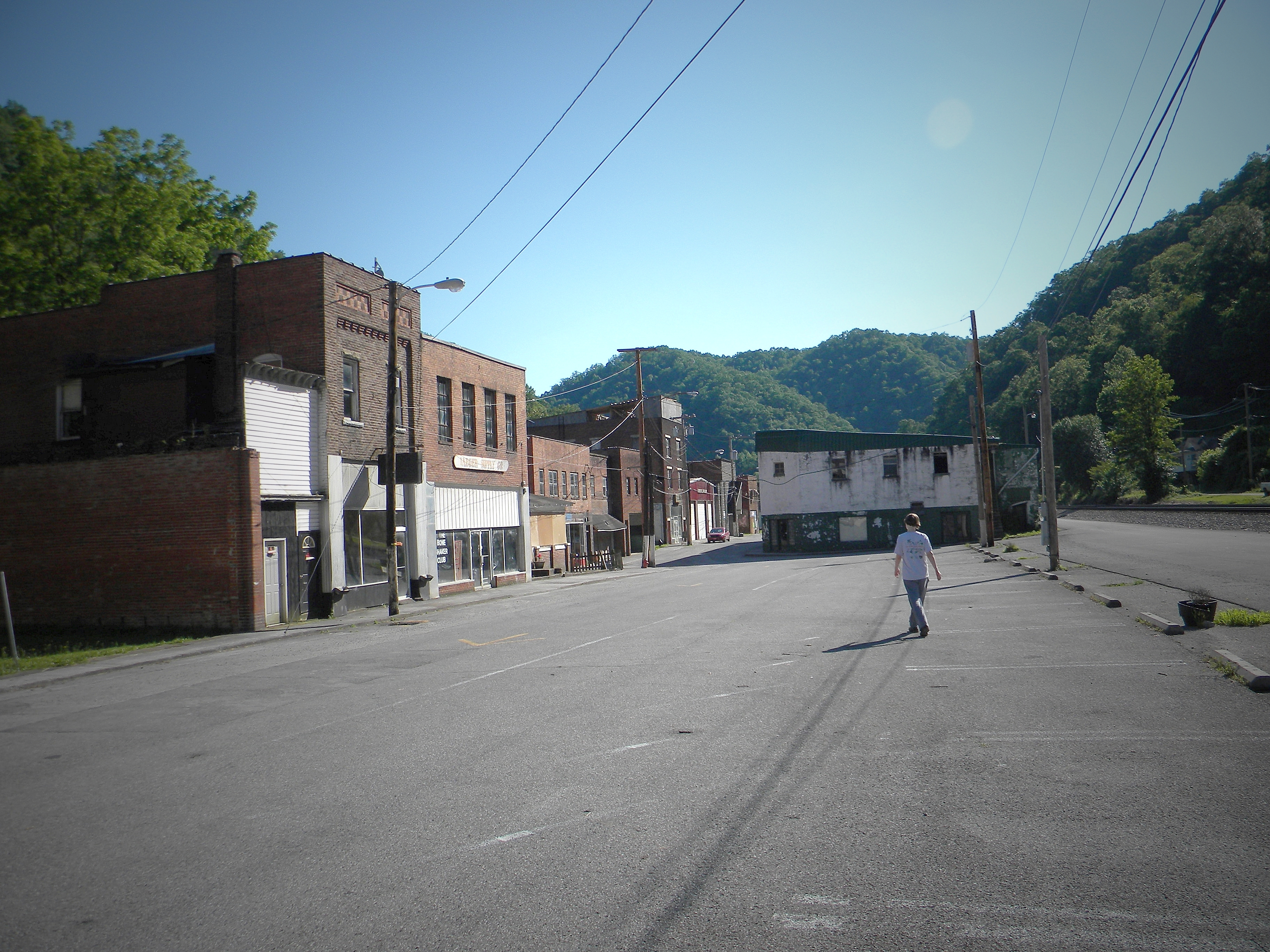
- Iaeger West Virginia 2017

- Location of Iaeger in McDowell County, West Virginia.

- Location within West Virginia Location within the United States
- Coordinates: 37°27′52″N 81°48′49″W
- Country: United States
- State: West Virginia
- County: McDowell

Area
  - Total: 0.83 sq mi (2.16 km^{2})
  - Land: 0.79 sq mi (2.05 km^{2})
  - Water: 0.042 sq mi (0.11 km^{2})
- Elevation: 980 ft (300 m)

Population (2020)
  - Total: 257
  - Density: 305.6/sq mi (117.98/km^{2})
- Time zone: UTC-5 (Eastern (EST))
  - Summer (DST): UTC-4 (EDT)
- ZIP code: 24844
- Area code: 304
- FIPS code: 54-39652
- GNIS feature ID: 1540647
- Website: https://local.wv.gov/iaeger/Pages/default.aspx

Iaeger (pronounced YAY-ger) is a town in McDowell County, West Virginia, United States. The population was 257 at the 2020 census.

== History ==
Iaeger was incorporated in 1917 and named for Colonel William G. W. Iaeger, an early settler.

== Geography ==
According to the United States Census Bureau, the town has a total area of 0.83 square miles (2.15 km^{2}), of which 0.79 square miles (2.05 km^{2}) is land and 0.04 square miles (0.10 km^{2}) is water.

A junction of the Norfolk Southern Railway is located in Iaeger.

It is the westernmost town in McDowell County.

=== Climate ===
The climate in this area is characterized by hot, humid summers and generally mild to cool winters. According to the Köppen Climate Classification system, Iaeger has a humid subtropical climate, abbreviated "Cfa" on climate maps.

== Demographics ==
Historical population
Census	Pop.	Note	%±
1920	481		—
1930	1,066		121.6%
1940	986		−7.5%
1950	1,271		28.9%
1960	930		−26.8%
1970	822		−11.6%
1980	833		1.3%
1990	551		−33.9%
2000	358		−35.0%
2010	302		−15.6%
2020	257		−14.9%
U.S. Decennial Census

=== 2010 census ===
As of the census of 2010, there were 302 people, 131 households, and 83 families living in the town. The population density was 382.3 inhabitants per square mile (147.6/km^{2}). There were 167 housing units at an average density of 211.4 per square mile (81.6/km^{2}). The racial makeup of the town was 98.3% White, 1.3% African American, and 0.3% from two or more races.

There were 131 households, of which 28.2% had children under the age of 18 living with them, 49.6% were married couples living together, 9.9% had a female householder with no husband present, 3.8% had a male householder with no wife present, and 36.6% were non-families. 32.1% of all households were made up of individuals, and 21.4% had someone living alone who was 65 years of age or older. The average household size was 2.31 and the average family size was 2.88.

The median age in the town was 45.3 years. 18.2% of residents were under the age of 18; 9.4% were between the ages of 18 and 24; 21.8% were from 25 to 44; 29.5% were from 45 to 64; and 21.2% were 65 years of age or older. The gender makeup of the town was 48.0% male and 52.0% female.

=== 2000 census ===
As of the census of 2000, there were 358 people, 167 households, and 106 families living in the town. The population density was 435.4 inhabitants per square mile (168.1/km^{2}). There were 216 housing units at an average density of 262.7 per square mile (101.4/km^{2}). The racial makeup of the town was 96.37% White, 2.51% African American, and 1.12% from two or more races. Hispanic or Latino of any race were 0.56% of the population.

There were 167 households, out of which 21.6% had children under the age of 18 living with them, 51.5% were married couples living together, 10.8% had a female householder with no husband present, and 36.5% were non-families. 34.7% of all households were made up of individuals, and 19.2% had someone living alone who was 65 years of age or older. The average household size was 2.14 and the average family size was 2.75.

In the town, the population was spread out, with 17.9% under the age of 18, 6.1% from 18 to 24, 27.9% from 25 to 44, 29.6% from 45 to 64, and 18.4% who were 65 years of age or older. The median age was 44 years. For every 100 females, there were 79.0 males. For every 100 females age 18 and over, there were 83.8 males.

The median income for a household in the town was $14,886, and the median income for a family was $21,250. Males had a median income of $23,750 versus $35,000 for females. The per capita income for the town was $17,263. About 29.0% of families and 32.8% of the population were below the poverty line, including 30.0% of those under age 18 and 29.3% of those age 65 or over.

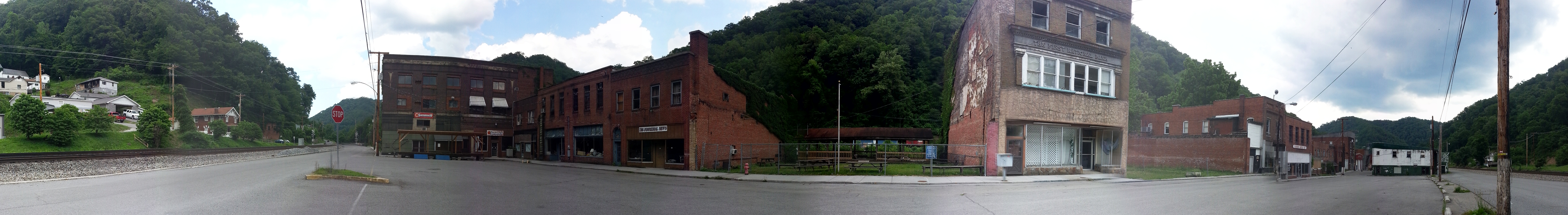
Abandoned storefronts in Iaeger, 2014
