= Logan County Schools =

School district in West Virginia, United States

Coordinates: 37°51′33.9″N 81°59′24.3″W

- Logan, West Virginia

District information
- Type: Public School District
- Superintendent: Jeff Huffman

Other information
- Website: https://boe.logan.k12.wv.us

Logan County Schools is the operating school district within Logan County, West Virginia. It is governed by the Logan County Board of Education.

== Schools ==
=== Elementary Schools ===
- Buffalo Elementary School
- Chapmanville Primary School
- Chapmanville Intermediate
- Holden Central Elementary School
- Hugh Dingess Elementary School
- Justice Elementary School
- Logan Elementary School
- Man Elementary School
- Omar Elementary School
- South Man Elementary School

=== Middle Schools ===
- Chapmanville Middle School
- Logan Middle School
- Man Middle School

=== High Schools ===
- Logan High School
- Chapmanville Regional High School
- Man High School
- Ralph R. Willis Career and Technical Center

== School Closures ==
In August of 2026, it was announced that the Logan County Board of Education is preparing documents for and discussing the closure of three of its elementary schools, South Man Elementary, Justice Elementary, and Hugh Dingess Elementary, due to declining enrollment, with each school having fewer than 100 students each. Following the more-than-likely closures of the three elementary schools, Logan County will have a total of seven elementary schools, and fourteen total schools.

The county has closed other schools for similar reasons in the past, such as Whitman Elementary School in the 1990s and Dehue Elementary School in 2011. In 2025, Verdunville Elementary School's building closed due to unsafe conditions following a landslide, at which point the school temporarily operated from Omar Elementary School's building for the 2025-2026 school year before officially closing and merging with Omar in 2026; had these issues not occurred, the school would likely still have closed in 2026 or 2027 due to its declining student enrollment.
