= Education in West Virginia =

Formal public school Education in West Virginia falls under the auspices of the West Virginia Department of Education. Each county in West Virginia constitutes a school district.

== Education administration ==
=== West Virginia Board of Education ===
The West Virginia Board of Education is established in the West Virginia Constitution. The Board is vested with general supervision of West Virginia's 611 elementary and secondary schools. Its twelve members include nine citizens appointed by the governor and three non-voting ex-officio members: the State Superintendent of Schools, the Chancellor of the West Virginia Higher Education Policy Commission, and the Chancellor of Community and Technical Education. The State Superintendent is a constitutional officer who serves at the will of the board. Board members serve overlapping terms of nine years, and no more than five citizen members may belong to the same political party.

The West Virginia Board of Education meets monthly to determine the educational policies of the elementary and secondary schools and to establish the rules that carry into effect state law regarding education. The State Board of Education also has general control, supervision, and management of the business and educational affairs of the West Virginia Schools for the Deaf and Blind in Romney.

=== County Boards of Education ===
For each K-12 school district there is a board of education with at least five members who are chosen by election in non-partisan races. Though no more than two members may reside in the same magisterial district, members are elected by residents of the entire county. Active teachers and service personnel are not eligible for election to the county Board of Education. Members are elected to four-year terms in which the election occurs during the regular primary election in even years.

In addition to the Boards of Education, each district also has an appointed Superintendent. He typically serves as the executive officer of the county school district and is responsible for enforcing policies of the West Virginia Board of Education. Assignments, transfers, suspensions, and promotions made by the County Superintendent are subject to approval by the county Board of Education. The Superintendent must be a resident of the county in which he serves or in a contiguous West Virginia county.

Each county school district falls within one of eight Regional Education Service Agencies (RESAs).

== History ==
Article X of the 1863 state constitution provided for free and universal system of schools. The 1872 constitution clarified that "White and colored persons shall not be taught in the same school."

In 1990, teachers in 47 of the 55 counties went on strike for eleven days. On February 22, 2018, teachers and support staff in all the state's counties struck the schools over pay and other issues shutting down all the public schools in the state. After nine days, the Legislature granted pay raises.

== Comparison ==
West Virginia ranks as one of the lowest scoring states for education in the United States. According to The National Assessment of Educational Progress, the state ranks significantly below the national average in mathematics, reading, writing, and science. This is compared to its surrounding states of Virginia, Maryland, Kentucky, Ohio and Pennsylvania who on average score higher than or equal to the national average.

== Schools ==
=== Colleges and universities ===
- Alderson-Broaddus College
- Appalachian Bible College
- Bethany College
- Bluefield State College
- Concord University
- Davis and Elkins College
- Eastern West Virginia Community & Technical College
- Fairmont State University
- Glenville State College
- Marshall University
- Ohio Valley University
- Potomac State College of West Virginia University
- Salem International University
- Shepherd University
- University of Charleston
- West Liberty University
- West Virginia School of Osteopathic Medicine
- West Virginia State University
- West Virginia University
- West Virginia University Institute of Technology
- West Virginia University at Parkersburg
- West Virginia Wesleyan College
- Wheeling University

=== High schools ===
- Berkeley Springs High School, Berkeley Springs
- Bluefield High School, Bluefield
- Braxton County High School, Sutton
- Bridgeport High School, Bridgeport
- Brooke High School, Wellsburg
- Buckhannon-Upshur High School, Buckhannon
- Buffalo High School, Buffalo
- Cabell Midland High School, Ona
- Calhoun High School, Mount Zion
- Cameron High School, Cameron
- Capital High School, Charleston
- Chapmanville Regional High School, Chapmanville
- Charleston Catholic High School, Charleston
- Clay County High School, Clay
- Clay-Battelle High School, Blacksville
- Cross Lanes Christian School, Cross Lanes
- Doddridge County High School, West Union
- East Fairmont High School, Fairmont
- East Hardy High School, Baker
- Elkins High School, Elkins
- Fairmont Senior High School, Fairmont
- Frankfort High School, Ridgeley
- George Washington High School, Charleston
- Gilmer County High School, Glenville
- Grafton High School, Grafton
- Greenbrier East High School, Lewisburg
- Greenbrier West High School, Charmco
- Hampshire High School, Romney
- Hannan High School, Ashton
- Harman High School, Harman
- Hedgesville High School, Hedgesville
- Herbert Hoover High School, Clendenin
- Hundred High School, Hundred
- Huntington High School, Huntington
- Hurricane High School, Hurricane
- Independence High School, Coal City
- James Monroe High School, Lindside
- Jefferson High School, Shenandoah Junction
- John Marshall High School, Glen Dale
- Keyser High School, Keyser
- Lewis County High School, Weston
- Liberty High School (Harrison), Clarksburg
- Liberty High School (Raleigh), Glen Daniel
- Lincoln High School, Shinnston
- Lincoln County High School, Hamlin
- Logan High School, Logan
- Madonna High School, Weirton
- Magnolia High School, New Martinsville
- Man High School, Man
- Martinsburg High School, Martinsburg
- Meadow Bridge High School, Meadow Bridge
- Mercer Christian Academy, Princeton
- Midland Trail High School, Hico
- Mingo Central Comprehensive High School, Delbarton
- Montcalm High School, Montcalm
- Moorefield High School, Moorefield
- Morgantown High School, Morgantown
- Mount View High School, Welch
- Musselman High School, Inwood
- Nicholas County High School, Summersville
- Nitro High School, Nitro
- North Marion High School, Farmington
- Notre Dame High School, Clarksburg
- Oak Glen High School, New Cumberland
- Oak Hill High School, Oak Hill
- Paden City High School, Paden City
- Parkersburg Catholic High School, Parkersburg
- Parkersburg High School, Parkersburg
- Parkersburg South High School, Parkersburg
- Paw Paw High School, Paw Paw
- Pendleton County High School, Franklin
- Petersburg High School, Petersburg
- Philip Barbour High School, Philippi
- Pickens School, Pickens
- PikeView High School, Princeton
- Poca High School, Poca
- Pocahontas County High School, Dunmore
- Point Pleasant High School, Point Pleasant
- Preston High School, Kingwood
- Princeton High School, Princeton
- Ravenswood High School, Ravenswood
- Richwood High School, Richwood
- Ripley High School, Ripley
- Ritchie County High School, Ellenboro
- Riverside High School, Belle
- Riverview High School, Bradshaw
- Roane County High School, Spencer
- Robert C. Byrd High School, Clarksburg
- Saint Albans High School, Saint Albans
- Saint Joseph Central Catholic High School, Huntington
- Saint Marys High School, Saint Marys
- Scott High School, Madison
- Shady Spring High School, Shady Spring
- Sherman High School, Seth
- Sissonville High School, Sissonville
- South Charleston High School, South Charleston
- South Harrison High School, Lost Creek
- Spring Mills High School, Martinsburg
- Spring Valley High School, Huntington
- Summers County Comprehensive High School, Hinton
- Teays Valley Christian School, Scott Depot
- Tolsia High School, Fort Gay
- Trinity High School, Morgantown
- Tucker County High School, Hambleton
- Tug Valley High School, Williamson
- Tygarts Valley High School, Mill Creek
- Tyler Consolidated High School, Sistersville
- Union High School, Mount Storm
- University High School, Morgantown
- Valley High School, Pine Grove
- Van Junior-Senior High School, Van
- Wahama High School, Mason
- Washington High School, Charles Town
- Wayne High School, Wayne
- Webster County High School, Upperglade
- Weir High School, Weirton
- Westside High School, Clear Fork
- Wheeling Central Catholic High School, Wheeling
- Wheeling Park High School, Wheeling
- Williamstown High School, Williamstown
- Winfield High School, Winfield
- Wirt County High School, Elizabeth
- Woodrow Wilson High School, Beckley
- Wyoming County East High School, New Richmond

== See also ==
- List of school districts in West Virginia
