= Paden =

Paden may refer to:

== Places in the United States ==
- Paden, Mississippi, a village
- Paden, Oklahoma, a town
- Paden City, West Virginia, a city
  - Paden City Elementary School
  - Paden City High School
- Paden Island, West Virginia

== Other uses ==
- Paden (surname)
- Paden Tolbert (c. 1863 or 1870–1904), American Old West marshal
- Paden's Drug Store, Carrizozo, New Mexico
- Paden, a character in the 1985 movie Silverado
- Paden, a clothing line created by Davey Havok
