= Mason County Schools =

Mason County Schools may refer to:

- Mason County Schools (Kentucky)
- Mason County Schools (West Virginia)
