= Hundred High School =

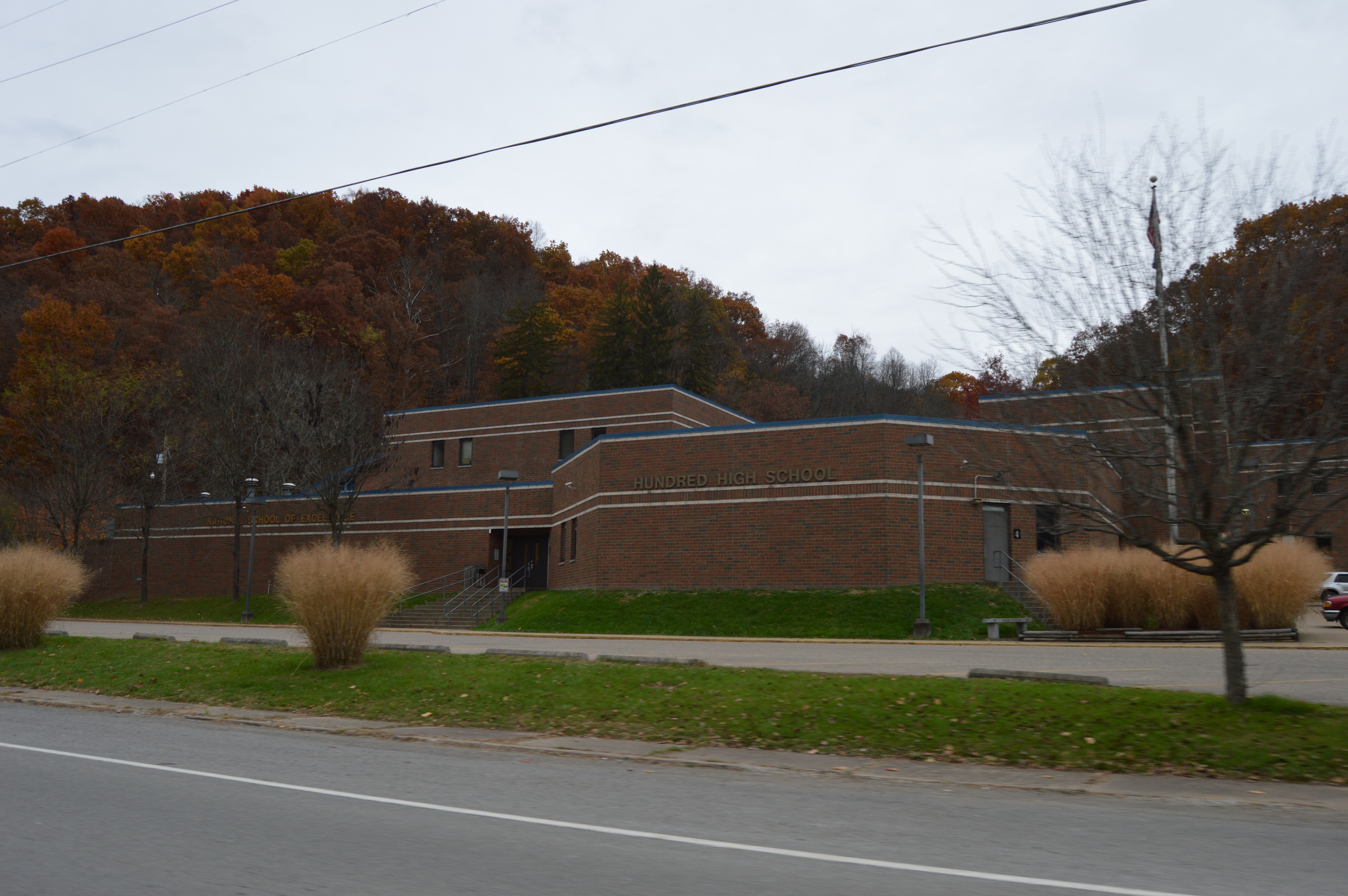

Location
- 3490 Hornet Highway; Hundred, West Virginia 26575; United States
- Coordinates: 39.6785°N 80.4546°W

Information
- Type: Public high school
- Opened: 1923
- Closed: 2025
- School district: Wetzel County Schools
- Superintendent: Cassie Porter
- CEEB code: 490575
- Principal: Dan Wilson
- Teaching staff: 12.00 (FTE)
- Grades: 9-12
- Student to teacher ratio: 6.50
- Campus type: Distant rural
- Colors: Navy, Red, and White
- Athletics conference: Ohio Valley Athletic Conference
- Team name: Hornets
- Athletic Director: Jamie Snyder
- Website: www.wetzelcountyschools.com/o/hhs

Hundred High School was a public high school in Hundred, West Virginia, United States. It was one of four high schools in the Wetzel County School District. Athletic teams competed as the Hundred Hornets in the West Virginia Secondary School Activities Commission as a member of the Ohio Valley Athletic Conference. Hundred High School opened in 1923, and remained operational until the merging with Valley High School in 2025.

== Student body ==
Hundred High was one of the smallest high schools in the state. The population is 54% male. The school is 98.9% White, and 1.1% Black.

== Consolidation of Hundred High School ==
In late 2024, the Wetzel County Board of Education held several meetings about plans to consolidate Hundred High School by merging it with Valley High School in western Wetzel County. Due to parents concerning about longer bus rides, and students having work schedules being altered due to the added length of travel, it left the Hundred community in a mild outrage.

On 22 November 2024, the student body of Hundred High School was asked to head to the school's auditorium to watch the final voting of the consolidation. While the consolidation passed, the result had the teacher and student bodies in disappointment. Hundred High School continued to operate for the rest of the 2024–25 school year, the building now occupied by the Long Drain School. In addition, the Wetzel County Board of Education made a decision to rename the building to Hundred Heritage School, keeping the original red, white and navy blue color scheme and the school's hornet mascot.
