= Magnolia High School (West Virginia) =

Location
- 601 Maple Avenue; New Martinsville, West Virginia 26155; United States; 39.6463°N 80.8613°W

Information
- Type: Public, coeducational high school
- Established: 1879
- School district: Wetzel County School District
- Superintendent: Cassie Porter
- CEEB code: 490930
- Principal: Melonie Miller
- Teaching staff: 29.50 (FTE)
- Grades: 9–12
- Student to teacher ratio: 9.73
- Campus type: Distant Town
- Colors: Navy and gold
- Athletics conference: Ohio Valley Athletic Conference
- Team name: Blue Eagles
- Yearbook: The Magnolian
- Website: www.wetzelcountyschools.com/o/mhs

Magnolia High School is a public high school in New Martinsville, West Virginia, United States. It is one of two high schools in the Wetzel County School District. Athletic teams compete as the Magnolia Blue Eagles in the West Virginia Secondary School Activities Commission as a member of the Ohio Valley Athletic Conference.

== History ==
=== Mascot ===
Magnolia's sports teams are now known as the "Blue Eagles". However, prior to 1933, the teams were known as the Blue Blizzard. The school changed the mascot to the Blue Eagles, the symbol of Franklin Roosevelt's National Recovery Act.

=== Facility ===
The current building is the fifth incarnation of the school, having been built in 1987–1988 and opened for use in the 1988–89 school year. The building is built on the site of the fourth building, which was built in 1923 to house a rapidly growing student population. That building was razed after the completion of the new school; currently, the auditorium and music departments sit on that site. A portion of that building still stands, as it was part of a 1960 addition to the school. The former shop and vocational rooms have been renovated and house home economics, art, driver education, and health/wellness classrooms.

== Academics ==
Magnolia offers a wide array of advanced placement courses and a particularly large number of advanced and AP courses for a school of its size. The school has produced a significant number of National Merit Scholarship finalists, attendees to the West Virginia Governors' Honors Academy, and academic prize recipients. In 1999, even though the graduating class numbered 134, Magnolia had the most National Merit Finalists of any school in the Ohio Valley, regardless of school size.

In 1998, Magnolia won the West Virginia Class AA Quiz Bowl championship. The school was runner-up in 1999.

== Athletics ==
=== Teams ===
Magnolia's athletic teams currently play in the WVSSAC at the A level and the OVAC at the AAA level. Teams include:

- Boys: Football, Soccer, Basketball, Baseball, Golf, Wrestling, Track, Cross Country, Cheerleading
- Girls: Soccer, Basketball, Softball, Volleyball, Track, Cross Country, Cheerleading, Tennis

Magnolia's boys basketball team was established in 1914, and their baseball team in 1916, being two of the oldest state high school teams.

=== WVSSAC State Championships ===
- Baseball – 1989, 2006
- Boys' Basketball – 1961, 1962, 2000, 2003, 2015
- Girls' Basketball – 2005
- Boys' Cross Country – 1981, 1986, 1987, 1990, 1996
- Girls' Cross Country – 1983, 1986, 1987
- Football – 1964, 2010, 2015
- Boys' Track – 1991, 1992, 1993, 1995, 1996, 1999, 2000, 2001, 2002, 2011, 2018
- Girls' Track – 1979, 1985, 1995, 1996, 1997, 2016
- Volleyball – 1983, 1984, 1999, 2018

==== Football ====
Magnolia has been playing high school football since 1903 and has amassed more than 600 victories. In 1912, Magnolia beat Woodsfield, Ohio 157–0 which still stands as the state record for the most points scored in a game.

The 2015 Magnolia football team beat East Hardy High School in the Class A Championship 62–0, which is the state record for the most points scored in a championship game.

On three occasions before 2021, a Magnolia football player has won the Harrison H. Kennedy Award.

== Fine Arts ==
=== Thespian Troupe #531 ===
The school has one of the longest-running musical theater programs in West Virginia, dating from 1963 and producing over 50 years of various types of musical theater programming. Since 2014, Magnolia Troupe 531 has produced most of their non-competition related musicals in collaboration with Paden City High School’s Troupe 4892.

=== MHS Band of Blue ===
The Magnolias HS Band of Blue is one of the oldest state programs, beginning in 1926. The band has won many awards over the years, and has competed in both the Tournament of Bands and Cavalcade of Bands.

=== Governors' School for the Arts ===
Magnolia regularly qualifies students to participate in the West Virginia Governors' School for the Arts, a summer program for the state's top rising juniors in theatre, music, dance and the visual arts.

== Clubs and organizations ==
- National Honor Society
- Science National Honor Society (established 2002)
- Mu Alpha Theta
- Quill and Scroll
- National Art Honor Society
- International Thespian Society (established ~1930)
- Drug Free Clubs of America
- Technology Students of America (TSA)
- Future Farmers of America (FFA)
- International Thespian Troupe #531

Magnolia's chapter of TSA won Outstanding Chapter in West Virginia 16 consecutive years (1995–2011).

Magnolia captured the AA West Virginia Quiz Bowl title in 1998 and was runner-up in 1999.

== Traditions ==
=== Fight song ===
"On Magnolia". sung to the tune of "On Wisconsin"

=== Alma Mater ===
The Magnolia High School Alma Mater is sung to the tune of "Annie Lisle".

== Notable alumni ==
- Bill Stewart – former head football coach at West Virginia University
- Chris Booker - entertainment personality

== See also ==
- List of Magnolia High Schools
- List of high schools in West Virginia
- Education in West Virginia
