= Mark Funkhouser =

American mayor (born 1949)

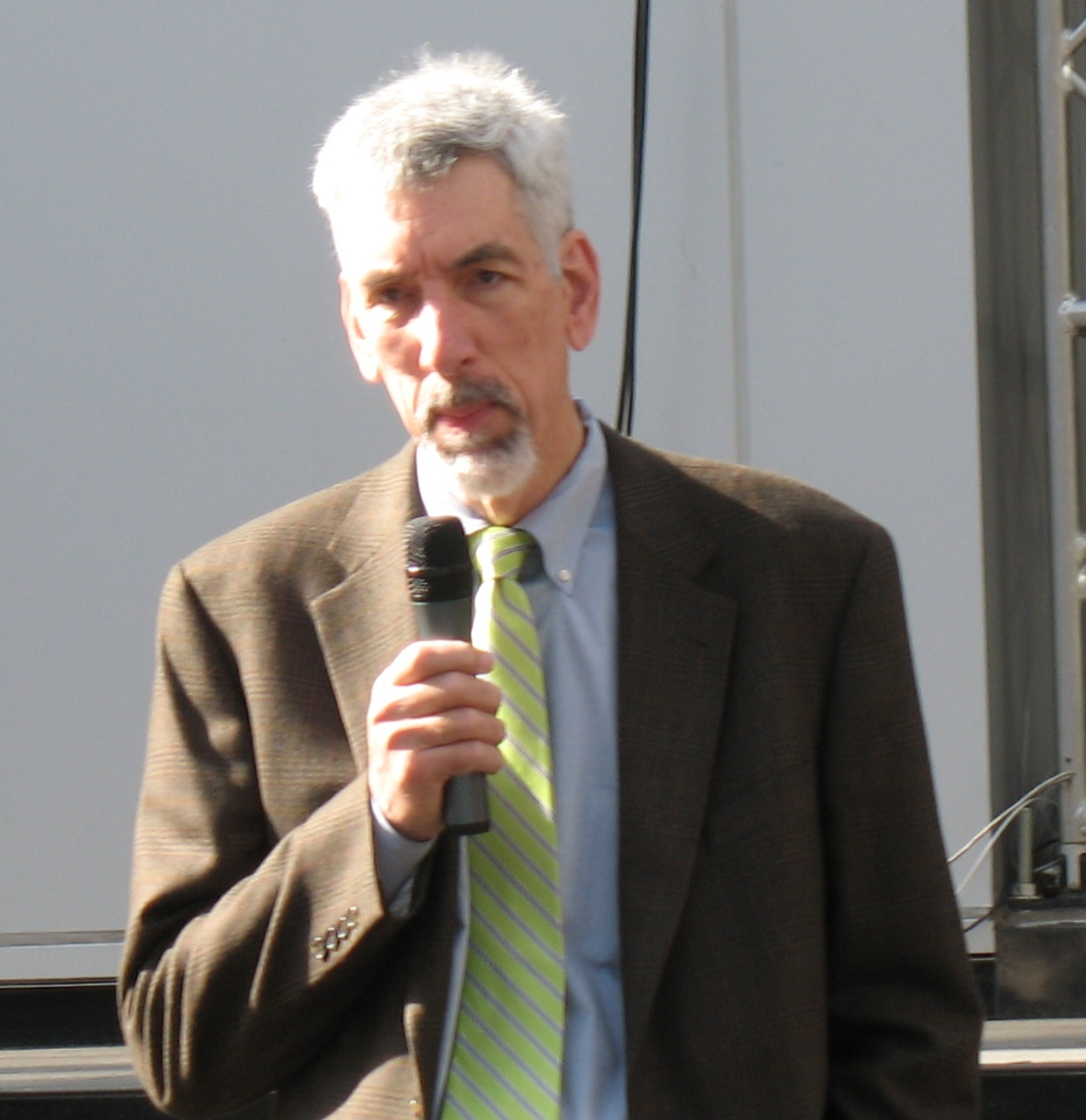

53rd Mayor of Kansas City
- In office May 1, 2007 – May 2, 2011
- Preceded by: Kay Barnes
- Succeeded by: Sly James

Personal details
- Born: Mark Funkhouser; October 4, 1949 (age 77) Paden City, West Virginia, U.S.
- Party: Democratic
- Spouse: Gloria Squitiro
- Children: 2
- Education: Thiel College (BA); Tennessee State University (MA); West Virginia University (MA); University of Missouri–Kansas City (PhD)

Mark Funkhouser (born October 4, 1949) is an American academic, author, and former politician who served as the 53rd mayor of Kansas City, Missouri, serving one four-year term from May 1, 2007, until May 2, 2011. Previously, he was Kansas City's city auditor. He was the publisher of Governing magazine. He is the author of the blog Bring on the Funk and the book Honest, Competent Government: The Promise of Performance Auditing. In 2016, he was elected as a fellow of the National Academy of Public Administration.

== Early life and education ==
Funkhouser was born and raised in Paden City, West Virginia, and he graduated from Paden City High School. He earned his B.A. in political science from Thiel College, his M.A. in business administration from Tennessee State University, M.A. in social work from West Virginia University and his Ph.D. from the University of Missouri–Kansas City.

== Early career ==
Funkhouser was the founding editor of the Local Government Auditing Quarterly for ten years. He has taught at Salem College, Salem, West Virginia, Park University, University of Missouri-Kansas City, University of Kansas, and Tulane University. He was the Director of State Audit in Nashville, Tennessee, from 1978 to 1988, then Kansas City Auditor in 1988, and ran for mayor in 2006.

=== 2007 mayoral race ===
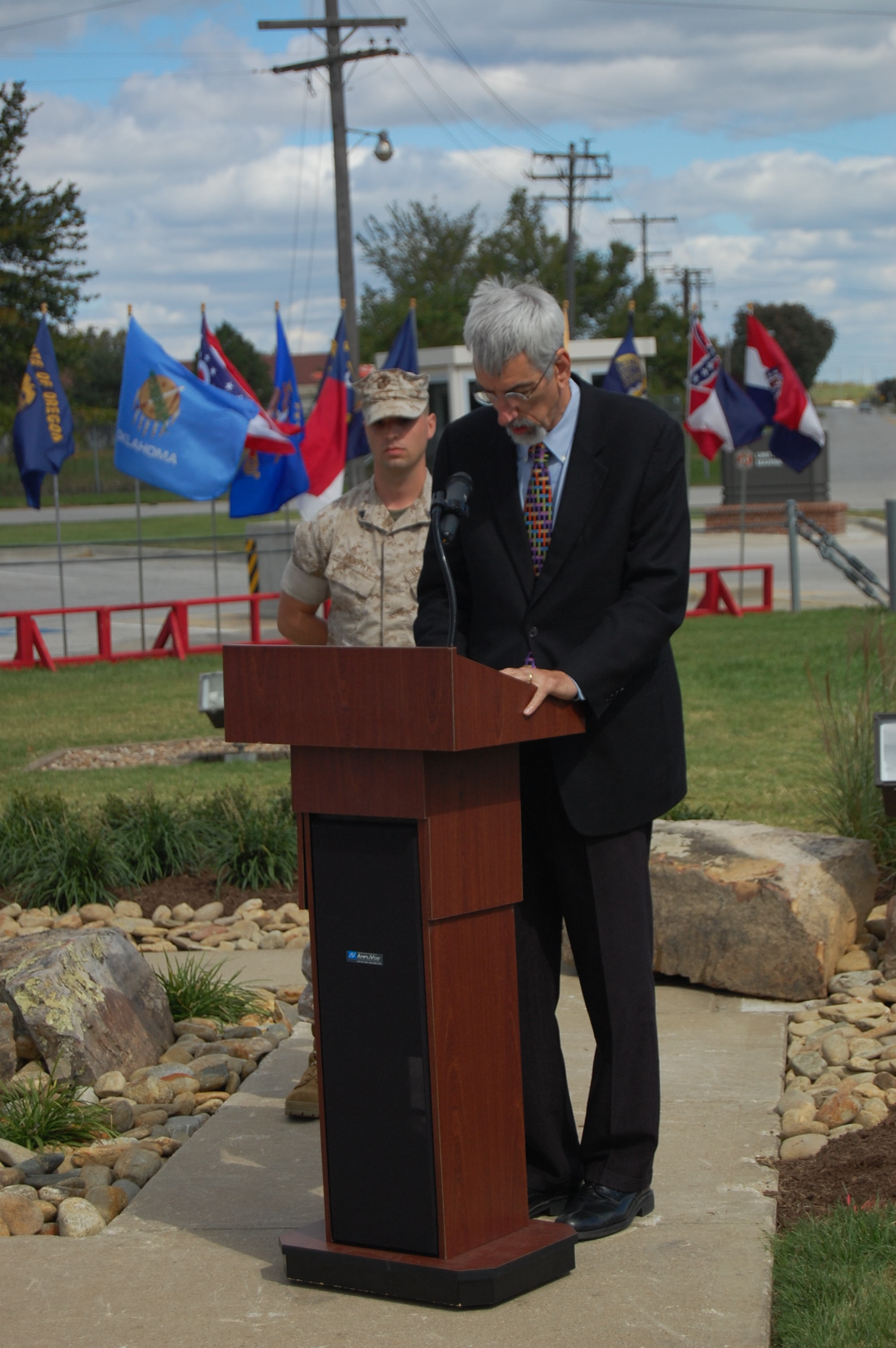
Mayor Funkhouser spoke at the Memorial Dedication ceremony October 2, 2010.

Announcing his candidacy for mayor of Kansas City, Missouri, in late 2006, Funkhouser was endorsed early by the Kansas City Star and emerged as one of two candidates following the February mayoral primary fielding 13 candidates. He won the mayoral election on March 27, 2007.

Funkhouser's campaign motto was "A city that works for regular folks." He had campaigned on a promise to pay more attention to neighborhoods and to end corrupt TIF deals with special-interest developers. During his mayoral campaign in 2007, he became known by Kansas Citians by his nickname, "The Funk".

His wife, Gloria Squitiro, ran his campaign. He wore an orange tie in reference to the Ukrainian Orange Revolution and as a symbol of his desire for change. From his campaign website: "I've chosen orange as my official campaign color because it is fast becoming a symbol for change in politics – a shift away from back-room deal making and toward an open style of governance that respects and listens to citizens." Funkhouser was also critical of project spending during the Kay Barnes administration. In a KCTV interview he said, "We've been buying stuff. What we don't know is whether what we bought is what is worth what we paid for it."

Kansas City mayoral election, 2007
Party	Candidate	Votes	%
Nonpartisan	Mark Funkhouser	42,799	50.5
Nonpartisan	Alvin Brooks	41,949	49.5

== Controversies ==
=== Free automobile ===
Implementation of Funkhouser's campaign pledges of fiscal conservatism while cleaning up local government received national headlines early in his administration when Funkhouser announced his intention to reject the costly city-provided Lincoln Continental, with two attending security drivers, and accept a new leased Honda Civic Hybrid from a Northland auto dealer. The city's law department approved the offer, which would have been reported to the Missouri Ethics Commission. Funkhouser believed that by being transparent about the transaction, he could avoid any appearance of impropriety and save the city $160,000 a year by rejecting the city-owned car, with its attendant driver and police security detail. However, critics questioned the "gift". City Councilman John Sharp said "It sure doesn't pass the smell test...It's nice that the mayor is providing so much free publicity to a foreign auto company." Funkhouser never took possession of the car, choosing instead to drive his own.

=== Minutemen controversy ===
It was discovered his appointed co-commissioner for the Parks and Recreation Board Frances Semler was a member of the Minuteman Civil Defense Corps. Critics insisted that Semler resign the board or the Minutemen. This controversy attracted national attention, prompting two national civil rights organizations (La Raza and the NAACP) to withdraw their conventions from Kansas City in protest of Funkhouser's refusal to ask for Semler's resignation from an organization they call a "hate group".

Funkhouser's supporters say he believes that "diversity" encompasses not only skin color but also opinion, and they point to another commissioner, Ajamu Webster, who founded the local National Black United Front (NBUF), an organization advocating reparations for blacks. They note that the Southern Rights Coalition doesn't consider the Minutemen a "hate group". They also claim Semler's personal views on immigration are not germane to her professional service as a parks commissioner.

=== Gloria Squitiro ===
An ongoing controversy during Funkhouser's term as mayor involved his wife's carrying out the normal duties of First Lady, a strictly volunteer position.

Funkhouser had stated that he and his wife were a "political team". He asserts that it was squarely within his authority to have anyone on a volunteer basis, further citing that Squitiro was his advisor during the election.

Critics said her participation in her husband's administration is a clear violation of the Missouri Constitution's "Nepotism Clause". The City Council passed an ordinance (the only nay vote being Funkhouser's) on the pretense of banning certain types of volunteers from serving at City Hall, but the only one it effectively barred was Squitiro from the premises. In response, Funkhouser began holding meetings in which she was needed in public libraries. Funkhouser filed suit against the city, claiming the "volunteer ordinance" unconstitutional. The court ruled in Funkhouser's favor and the ordinance was repealed.

== Personal life ==
Funkhouser is an avid chess player, and celebrated his election night party at the Westport Flea Market, a neighborhood tavern where he regularly played with the Westport Chess Club. He is a professional speaker and consultant, as well as the founder of the International Center for Performance Auditing. He stands at 6 feet 8 inches (2.03 m) tall.

Political offices
Preceded by Kay Waldo Barnes	Mayor of Kansas City, Missouri; 2007-2011	Succeeded by Sly James
