= Mel Clark =

American baseball player (1924–2014)

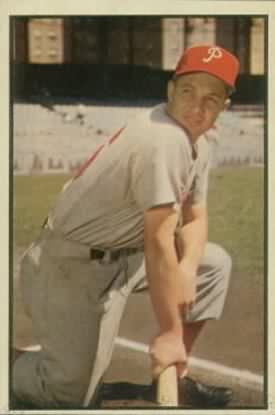
- Right fielder
- Born: July 7, 1924; Letart, West Virginia, U.S.
- Died: May 1, 2014 (aged 89); West Columbia, West Virginia, U.S.
- Batted: Right Threw: Right

MLB debut
- September 11, 1951, for the Philadelphia Phillies

Last MLB appearance
- May 1, 1957, for the Detroit Tigers

MLB statistics
- Batting average: .277
- Home runs: 3
- Runs batted in: 63
- Stats at Baseball Reference

Teams
- Philadelphia Phillies (1951–1955); Detroit Tigers (1957)

Melvin Earl Clark (July 7, 1924 – May 1, 2014) was an American professional baseball outfielder, who played in Major League Baseball (MLB) for the Philadelphia Phillies (1951–1955) and Detroit Tigers (1957), appearing in 215 big league games. He threw and batted right-handed, stood 6 feet (1.8 m) tall, and weighed 180 pounds (82 kg).

Clark was born in Letart, West Virginia, graduated from Wahama High School, and — after World War II service in the Pacific Theater in the United States Navy — attended Ohio University. Signed by the Phillies in 1947, he spent five years in their farm system before his September 1951 end-of-season recall. Clark hit the ground running, collecting seven hits in his first 14 MLB at bats, including his first big-league home run, hit September 12 against Howie Pollet of the Pittsburgh Pirates.

Clark then spent all of 1952, 1953 and 1954 as a spare outfielder on the Phillies' roster. He hit a robust .335 and .298 in his first two full years, but a knee injury suffered during 1953 took its toll on Clark's production. His batting average fell to .240 during 1954, then, in 1955, he was sent down to Triple-A Syracuse at the May cutdown when he could muster only a .156 batting average in ten games. The Phillies sent Clark to the Washington Senators in a July 1956 minor-league transaction; after a half-season at Triple-A, the Senators sold his contract to the Detroit Tigers, where in 1957 he batted seven times in five games before returning to the high minors for the final two seasons of his pro career.

Over the course of his MLB career, Clark had 182 hits in 656 at bats, with 29 doubles, 15 triples, and three home runs.
