= Jeff Casteel =

American football coach

Current position
- Title: Outside linebackers coach
- Team: West Virginia
- Conference: Big 12
- Annual salary: $305,526.63 (Nevada: 2019)

Biographical details
- Born: February 1, 1962 (age 64); Paden City, West Virginia, U.S.
- Education: California University of Pennsylvania

Coaching career (HC unless noted)
- 1984–1986: California (PA) (GA)
- 1987: Miami Palmetto HS (FL) (DL)
- 1988–1990: Shepherd (DL)
- 1991–1999: Shepherd (AHC/DC)
- 2000: UTEP (DE)
- 2001: West Virginia (DL)
- 2002: West Virginia (co-DC/LB)
- 2003–2011: West Virginia (DC/LB)
- 2012–2015: Arizona (DC/LB)
- 2017–2019: Nevada (DC/LB)
- 2020: West Virginia (OLB)
- 2021–2024: West Virginia (Analyst)
- 2025: West Virginia (Bandits)

Jeffrey Allen Casteel (born February 1, 1962) is a former American football coach. He was the defensive coordinator for West Virginia University, the University of Arizona, and the University of Nevada.

== Early life and education ==
Casteel was raised in Paden City, West Virginia and graduated from Paden City High School where he was a football stand out and member of the Paden City 1979 West Virginia Class 'A' State Champion Football Team.

== Coaching career ==
=== Early years ===
Casteel earned bachelor's and master's degrees from California University of Pennsylvania. After graduation, he served as a graduate assistant for his alma mater from 1984 to 1986 and also served in the training camp for the Baltimore Stallions of the Canadian Football League (CFL). However in 1987, Casteel was defensive coordinator at Miami Palmetto High School. He then served as defensive line and strength coach for Shepherd University from 1988 to 1990. He was then moved to assistant head coach and defensive coordinator from 1991 to 1999. During that time period of being assistant head coach, Shepherd won six West Virginia Intercollegiate Athletic Conference (WVIAC) championships.

After his tenure at Shepherd, Casteel moved to University of Texas at El Paso (UTEP) and coached the defensive ends for 2000. During that season, UTEP won the Western Athletic Conference (WAC) title and a berth to the Humanitarian Bowl.

=== West Virginia ===
After his one season at UTEP, Casteel moved to West Virginia University to join head coach Rich Rodriguez and coach the defensive line for the 2001 season. He was elevated to co-defensive coordinator alongside Todd Graham in 2002 and eventually became the full-time defensive coordinator and linebackers coach in 2003.

In 2005, the Mountaineers defense ranked 15th in the nation in total defense and 13th in points allowed under Casteel. In 2006, the Mountaineers pass defense ranked #109 out of the nation, 119 teams. The next season, 2007, the acquisitions of safety Ryan Mundy and freshman defensive backs helped the Mountaineer defense to a top 10 defensive ranking. His 2007 defense also ranked in the top 30 in eight categories. The Mountaineers finished seventh in the nation in total defense, eighth in scoring defense and 14th in pass efficiency defense. Following the season, Casteel was named the Defensive Coordinator of the Year by Rivals.com.

When former head coach Rodriguez departed West Virginia to accept the head coaching job at the University of Michigan, Casteel originally planned to follow Rodriguez. But after interim head coach Bill Stewart was promoted to head coach following Mountaineers' victory over the Oklahoma Sooners in the 2008 Fiesta Bowl, Casteel decided to stay at West Virginia. For the 2008 season, Casteel and the new defensive staff helped the young Mountaineers defense to a #1 redzone defense national ranking, a #11 scoring defense national ranking, a #11 fourth down defensive national ranking, and a #16 passing efficiency defense national ranking. These Top 20 ranking were despite starting a true freshman at safety, Robert Sands, and the loss of all-conference linebacker Reed Williams to a medical redshirt.

=== Arizona ===
Following West Virginia's victory in the 2012 Orange Bowl, Casteel departed to join the staff at Arizona under Rich Rodriguez, who was hired as head coach in November 2011. An official announcement and Casteel's formal introduction to the Tucson media was made on January 11, 2012.

On January 4, 2016, Jeff Casteel was fired as the Arizona Defensive Coordinator.

Casteel was offered the defensive coordinator position at UTEP prior to the 2016 season, but turned it down. Instead, Casteel spent the 2016 season watching his son, Jake, play linebacker for Northern Arizona. It was the first time in 31 years that Casteel took a year off from coaching.

=== Nevada ===
On December 19, 2016, Casteel was announced as the new defensive coordinator and linebackers coach for the University of Nevada, Reno under head coach Jay Norvell. Casteel earned $225,000 annually, the most ever for a Nevada Wolf Pack football assistant coach. Nevada and Casteel used the 3-3-5 as the base defense.

=== Return to West Virginia ===
On March 6, 2020, West Virginia University head coach Neal Brown announced that Casteel would join the Mountaineer football staff as a defensive analyst. That summer, after Vic Koenning's departure as the team's defensive coordinator, staff adjustments were made and Casteel was promoted to outside linebackers coach. He returned to his role as a defensive analyst for the 2021 season and remained in that role through the remainder of Brown's tenure at West Virginia.

On January 6, 2025, one month after Rich Rodriguez was hired to return to West Virginia as its head football coach, Casteel was announced as the team's bandits coach for the 2025 season. His son, Jake, was also a member of the 2025 West Virginia coaching staff serving as an assistant defensive coach.

=== Retirement ===
On January 23, 2026, West Virginia University head coach Rich Rodriguez announced that Casteel had retired from coaching football after a 36-year career.

== Personal life ==
Casteel and his wife, Rosemary, have two children, Jake and Sarah. He holds bachelor's and master's degrees from California University of Pennsylvania.
