= West Virginia Route 69 =

State highway in West Virginia, United States

West Virginia Route 69
- WV 69 highlighted in red

Route information
- Maintained by WVDOH
- Length: 3.5 mi (5.6 km)

Major junctions
- South end: US 250 in Hundred
- North end: PA 18 near Hundred

Location
- Country: United States
- State: West Virginia
- Counties: Wetzel

Highway system
- West Virginia State Highway System; Interstate; US; State
← WV 68	→ I-70

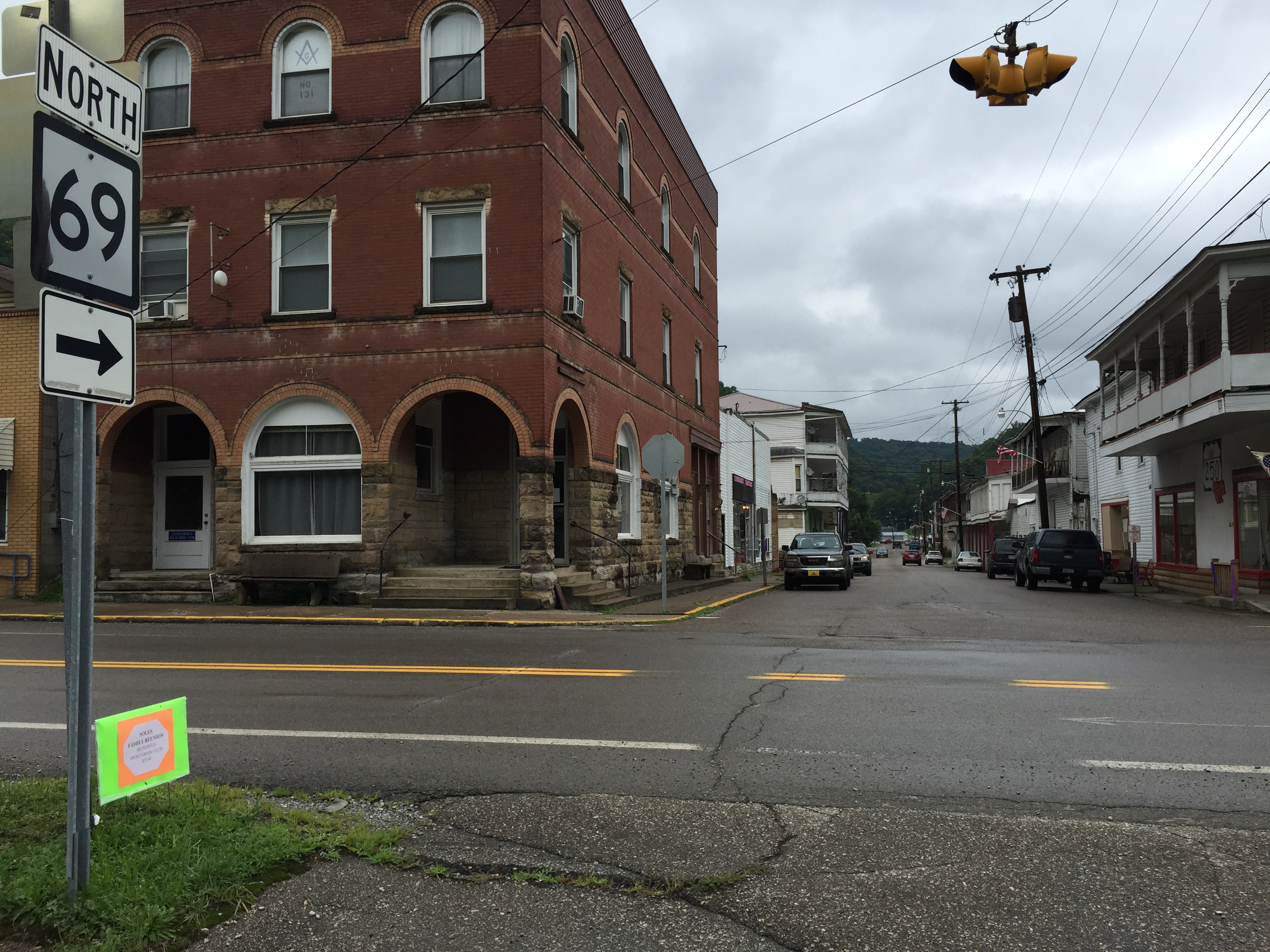
View north at the south end of WV 69 at US 250 in Hundred

West Virginia Route 69 is a north–south state highway located within Wetzel County, West Virginia. The southern terminus of the route is at U.S. Route 250 (US 250) in Hundred. The northern terminus is at the Pennsylvania state line three miles (5 km) north of Hundred, where WV 69 continues northward as Pennsylvania Route 18 (PA 18).

== Route description ==
WV 69 begins at an intersection with US 250 in Hundred, heading east on two-lane undivided Pennsylvania Avenue. The road passes through the commercial downtown before entering residential areas. The route leaves Hundred and heads into forested areas with some homes and fields. WV 69 winds to the north as it heads through more rural areas before reaching the Pennsylvania border, where the road continues into that state as PA 18.

== Major intersections ==
The entire route is in Wetzel County.

Location	mi	km	Destinations	Notes
Hundred			US 250	
			PA 18 north (Golden Oaks Road) – Waynesburg	Pennsylvania state line
1.000 mi = 1.609 km; 1.000 km = 0.621 mi
