= Bob Adkins =

American football player (1917–1997)

No. 55, 79
- Position: BB/DE/G/LB

Personal information
- Born: February 17, 1917; Letart, West Virginia, U.S.
- Died: December 6, 1997 (aged 80); Point Pleasant, West Virginia, U.S.
- Listed height: 6 ft 1 in (1.85 m)
- Listed weight: 213 lb (97 kg)

Career information
- High school: Point Pleasant (WV)
- College: Marshall

Career history
- Green Bay Packers (1940–1941); Green Bay Packers (1945–1946)

Career NFL statistics
- Games played: 20
- Games started: 5
- Receptions: 4
- Receiving Yards: 73
- Touchdowns: 2
- Stats at Pro Football Reference

Robert Grant Adkins (February 17, 1917 – December 6, 1997) was an American professional football blocking back, defensive end, guard and linebacker in the National Football League who played for the Green Bay Packers. Adkins played collegiate ball for Marshall University and professionally in the NFL for 3 seasons.
