= Stand Up and Cheer (song) =

University fight song

Song
- Written: 1909
- Genre: Fight song
- Songwriter: Paul P. McNeely

"Stand Up and Cheer" was written by Paul P. McNeely in 1909 for use at the University of Kansas, where it is still played today as a secondary fight song, and used as the primary fight song at Ohio University, Athens, Western Kentucky University, and many others. It is also played as a secondary fight song at Columbia University.

Another version was created by popular songwriters Lew Brown (lyrics) and Harry Akst (music) for the 1934 film Stand Up and Cheer! starring Shirley Temple.

It is the fight song of:

- Western Kentucky University in Bowling Green, Kentucky,
- Ohio University in Athens, Ohio,
- Montana State University in Bozeman, MT,
- Southeast Missouri State University in Cape Girardeau, Missouri
- University of North Dakota in Grand Forks, North Dakota,
- Concordia College in Moorhead, Minnesota
- Franklin College in Franklin, Indiana
- Southwestern Oklahoma State University in Weatherford, Oklahoma
- Acadia University in Wolfville, Nova Scotia,
- Grove City College in Grove City, Pennsylvania,
- Haverhill High School in Haverhill, Massachusetts,
- Masconomet Regional High School in Boxford, Massachusetts
- Oxford Hills Comprehensive High School in South Paris, Maine
- Walter L Sickles High School in Tampa, Florida,
- Clarksville High School in Clarksville, Tennessee,
- Elizabethtown High School in Elizabethtown, KY
- South St. Paul High School in So. St. Paul, MN
- Martinsburg High School, in Martinsburg, West Virginia,
- Westlake High School, in Westlake, Ohio,
- Richwood High School, in Richwood, West Virginia,
- South Charleston High School in South Charleston, West Virginia,
- Lawrence High School, Lawrence, Kansas
- Fenton High School in Fenton, Michigan,
- Madisonville North Hopkins High School in Madisonville, Kentucky,
- Bell County High School in Pineville, Kentucky .
- Oakwood High School in Dayton, Ohio
- Midpark High School in Middleburg Hts., Ohio.
- North Plainfield High School in North Plainfield, New Jersey
- Quincy Senior High School in Quincy IL.
- Ona Junior High School in Ona, WV.(formerly)
- duPont Manual Magnet High School in Louisville, Kentucky.
- Palo Verde High School, Tucson, AZ
- Upper Arlington High School, Upper Arlington, Ohio,
- William Mason High School, Mason, OH
- Zeeland East High School, Zeeland, MI
- Franklin Heights High School, Columbus, OH
- Glenwood High School, Chatham, IL
- Orchard Farm High School, St. Charles, MO
- Thomas Worthington High School, Worthington, Ohio
- Worthingway Middle School, Worthington, Ohio
- Kilbourne Middle School, Worthington, Ohio
- Canal Winchester High School, Canal Winchester, Ohio
- Westerville South High School. Westerville, Ohio
- Clinton High School in Clinton, Michigan
- Wichita East High School in Wichita, Kansas
- New Lexington High School, New Lexington Ohio
- Marion-Franklin High School, Columbus, Ohio
- Hiawatha High School in Hiawatha, KS
- Madison Plains High School, London, Ohio
- Ottawa Hills High School in Ottawa Hills Ohio
- Wahama High School in Mason, West Virginia
- Warren G. Harding High School in Warren, Ohio
- Everett Jr. High/Middle School in Columbus, Ohio
- Camp Hawthorne in Raymond, Maine
- Bellevue High School in Bellevue, Ohio
- Galion High School in Galion, Ohio
- Summit High School in Summit, New Jersey
- Summit High School in Spring Hill, Tennessee
- Benton High School, St. Joseph, MO
- Fulton High School, Middleton, MI
- Danbury High School in Marblehead, Ohio
- East Orange High School in East Orange, New Jersey
- Canandaigua Academy in Canandaigua, NY
- Lancaster High School in Lancaster, Ohio
- Union College in Barbourville, KY
- Pulaski County High School in Dublin, VA
- Pulaski County High School in Somerset, KY
- Taylors Falls High School in Taylors Falls, MN
- Independence High School in Independence, Ohio
- Ferndale Area High School in Johnstown, PA
- Hopewell-Loudon Schools in Bascom, OH
- Portsmouth East High School in Sciotoville, OH (through 2000)
- Trinidad High School in Trinidad, CO
