= Clark, Pennsylvania =

Borough in Pennsylvania, US

- Borough
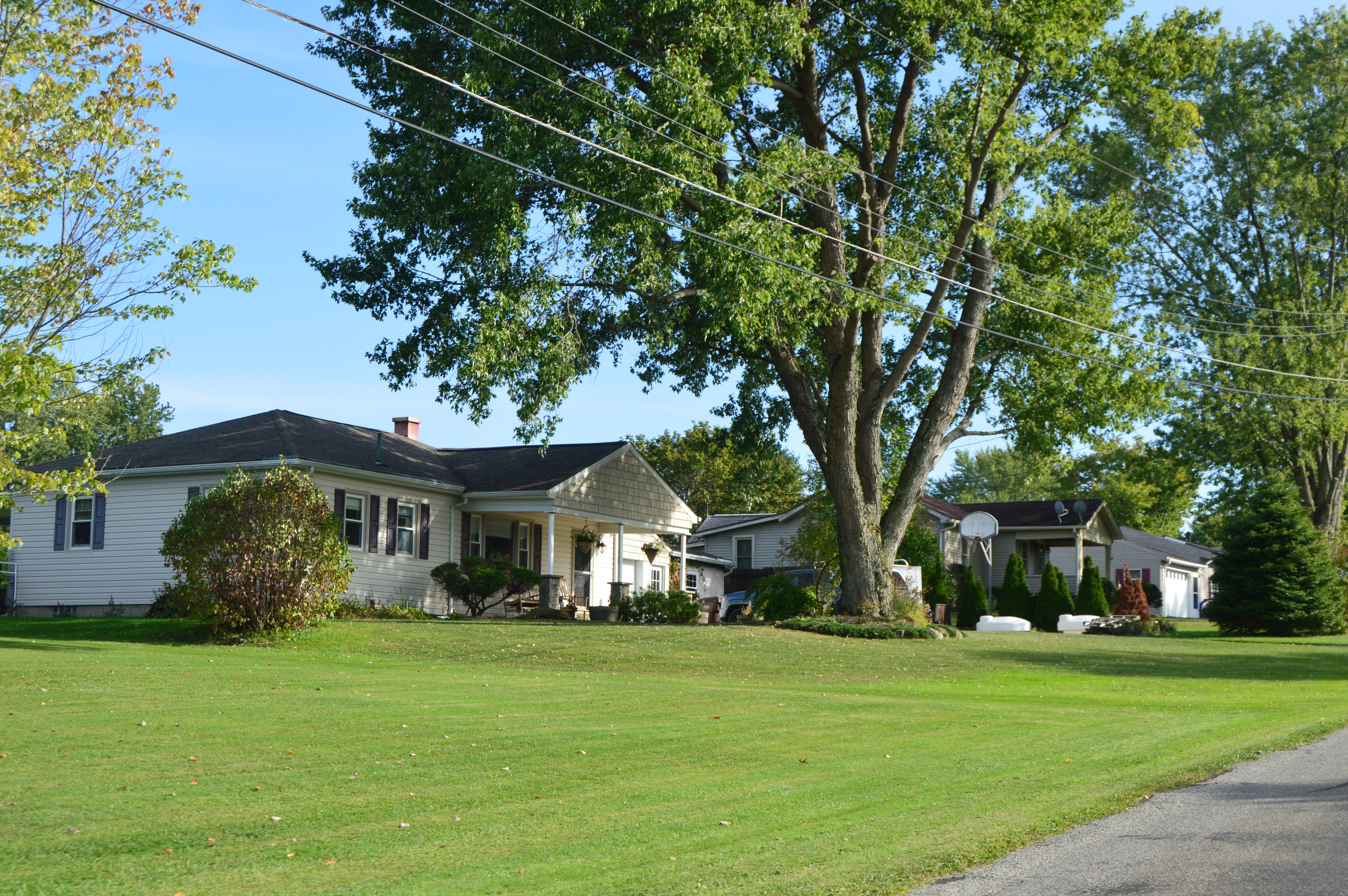
- Houses on Milton Street

- Location of Clark in Mercer County, Pennsylvania.
- Coordinates: 41°16′55″N 80°24′35″W
- Country: United States
- State: Pennsylvania
- County: Mercer
- Established: 1829

Area
  - Total: 3.62 sq mi (9.38 km^{2})
  - Land: 3.01 sq mi (7.80 km^{2})
  - Water: 0.61 sq mi (1.58 km^{2})
- Highest elevation (southwest corner of township): 1,200 ft (370 m)
- Lowest elevation (Shenango River Reservoir): 896 ft (273 m)

Population (2020)
  - Total: 576
  - Density: 191.3/sq mi (73.87/km^{2})
- Time zone: UTC-4 (EST)
  - Summer (DST): UTC-5 (EDT)
- Zip code: 16113
- Area code: 724
- FIPS code: 42-13832

Clark, originally Clarksville, is a borough in western Mercer County, Pennsylvania, United States, along the southern shore of the Shenango River Reservoir. The population was 576 at the 2020 census. It is part of the Hermitage micropolitan area.

== History ==
Clarksville was laid out in 1829 by Samuel Clark, the owner of the land upon which the site was located. Originally, forty-nine lots were laid out and sold. Clarksville was officially incorporated as a borough on May 5, 1848. In the early 1960s, the entire village was moved to allow the U.S. Army Corps of Engineers to build a Shenango River dam for flood control near Sharpsville. A new village site was laid out on property south of the old town. The original community moved to the present site following the construction of the dam, which was completed in 1965. In 1968, the town's new identity of Clark was established.

== Geography ==
Clark is located at 41°16′55″N 80°24′35″W (41.282049, -80.409591).

According to the United States Census Bureau, the borough has a total area of 3.8 square miles (9.8 km^{2}), of which 3.0 square miles (7.8 km^{2}) is land and 0.7 square miles (1.8 km^{2}) (19.31%) is water.

=== Notable locations ===
- NorthStar Marina
- Pete's Berry farm
- Clark House

== Demographics ==
Historical population
Census	Pop.	Note	%±
1880	264		—
1900	220		—
1910	216		−1.8%
1920	224		3.7%
1930	279		24.6%
1940	321		15.1%
1950	345		7.5%
1960	312		−9.6%
1970	467		49.7%
1980	667		42.8%
1990	610		−8.5%
2000	633		3.8%
2010	640		1.1%
2020	576		−10.0%
2021 (est.)	571	▼	−0.9%

As of the census of 2000, there were 633 people, 227 households, and 194 families residing in the borough. The population density was 207.9 inhabitants per square mile (80.3/km^{2}). There were 233 housing units at an average density of 76.5 per square mile (29.5/km^{2}). The racial makeup of the borough was 99.53% White, 0.16% African American, 0.16% from other races, and 0.16% from two or more races. Hispanic or Latino of any race were 0.47% of the population.

There were 227 households, out of which 32.2% had children under the age of 18 living with them, 76.7% were married couples living together, 7.0% had a female householder with no husband present, and 14.1% were non-families. 11.9% of all households were made up of individuals, and 5.3% had someone living alone who was 65 years of age or older. The average household size was 2.79 and the average family size was 3.02.

In the borough the population was spread out, with 23.4% under the age of 18, 6.3% from 18 to 24, 28.0% from 25 to 44, 29.2% from 45 to 64, and 13.1% who were 65 years of age or older. The median age was 41 years. For every 100 females there were 92.4 males. For every 100 females age 18 and over, there were 93.2 males.

The median income for a household in the borough was $53,438, and the median income for a family was $56,944. Males had a median income of $40,729 versus $26,625 for females. The per capita income for the borough was $24,892. About 1.0% of families and 1.7% of the population were below the poverty line, including none of those under age 18 and 4.3% of those age 65 or over.
