= Magnolia High School =

Magnolia High School can refer to any of the following educational institutions:

- Magnolia High School (Arkansas) in Magnolia, Arkansas
- Magnolia High School (California) in Anaheim, California
- Magnolia High School in Vicksburg, Mississippi, predecessor of Rosa A. Temple High School
- Magnolia High School (Texas) in Magnolia, Texas
- Magnolia High School (West Virginia) in New Martinsville, West Virginia
