= Wetzel County Schools =

School district in Wetzel County, West Virginia

Wetzel County Schools is the school district within Wetzel County, West Virginia, United States.

== Divisions ==
Wetzel County Schools is divided into four attendance areas: the Hundred area, the New Martinsville area, the Paden City area, and the Short Line area.

In the Hundred and Short Line areas one school serves Pre-Kindergarten through eighth grade and another school serves ninth through twelve. In New Martinsville, one school serves kindergarten through eighth grade and another school serves nine through twelve. In Paden City, one school serves kindergarten through sixth and another school serves seven through twelve. New Martinsville and Paden City share a pre-kindergarten facility that is located near New Martinsville. Wetzel County Schools is governed by the Wetzel County Board of Education.

== Schools ==
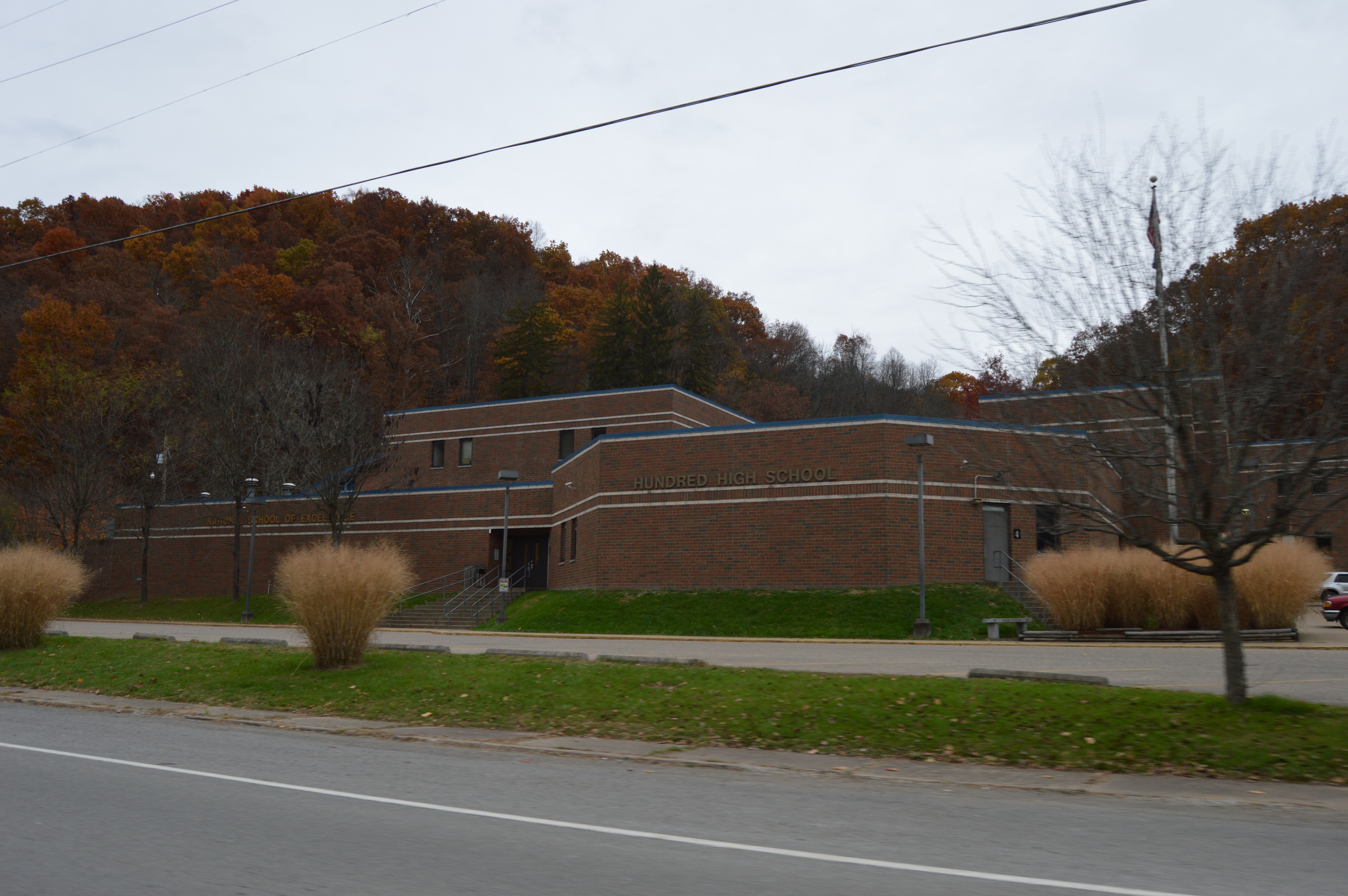
Hundred High School

=== Pre-kindergarten facility ===
- Wetzel County Center for Children and Families (Pre-K) (near New Martinsville)

=== Elementary and middle schools ===
- Hundred Heritage School, Pre-K through grade 8, Hundred
- New Martinsville School, K through grade 8, New Martinsville
- Paden City Elementary School, K through grade 6, Paden City
- Short Line School, Pre-K through grade 8, Reader

=== High schools ===
- Magnolia High School, grades 9–12, New Martinsville
- Valley High School, grades 9–12, Pine Grove
