= Valley High School (Pine Grove, West Virginia) =

Location
- 44 Lumberjack Lane; Pine Grove, West Virginia 26419; United States
- Coordinates: 39.5640°N 80.6773°W

Information
- Type: Public high school
- School district: Wetzel County Schools
- Superintendent: Tammy Wells
- CEEB code: 491040
- Principal: J.C. Kimble
- Teaching staff: 17.50 (FTE)
- Grades: 9-12
- Student to teacher ratio: 7.09
- Campus type: Distant Rural
- Color: Black Gold
- Athletics conference: Ohio Valley Athletic Conference
- Team name: Lumberjacks
- Athletic Director: John Kocher
- Website: www.wetzelcountyschools.com/o/vhs

Valley High School is a public high school in Pine Grove, West Virginia, United States. It is one of two high schools in the Wetzel County School District. Athletic teams compete as the Valley Lumberjacks in the West Virginia Secondary School Activities Commission as a member of the Ohio Valley Athletic Conference.
