= Paden City High School =

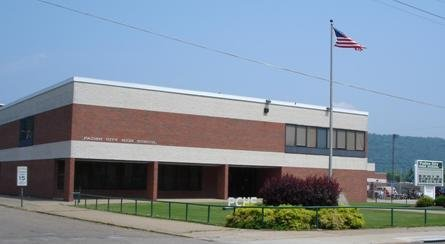

Location
- 201 N. Fourth Avenue; Paden City, Wetzel, West Virginia 26159; United States; 39.605°N 80.932°W

Information
- School type: Public
- Motto: Committed to Excellence
- Founded: 1951
- Closed: 2025
- School district: Wetzel County Schools
- Superintendent: Cassandra Porter
- Principal: Elliott Kendle
- Teaching staff: 17.30 (FTE)
- Grades: 7–12
- Enrollment: 160 (2023-2024)
- Student to teacher ratio: 9.25
- Language: English
- Colors: Green and white
- Mascot: Wildcat
- Team name: Wildcats
- Yearbook: The Green and White
- Athletic Director (9-12): Stacey Yoho
- Website: www.wetzelcountyschools.com

Paden City High School was a 7–12 grade, class A high school in Wetzel County, West Virginia in the small town of Paden City.

Paden City High School opened its doors as a 9-12 school in 1951 and graduated its first class in 1952. As of 2014, Paden City High School houses grades 7-12 with an enrollment of 158.

PCHS has received recognitions for academics and has been named a W.V.D.E. High Achieving School and for the W.V.D.E. Annual Performance Index, PCHS received the status of "Distinguished School," which means it was the upper quartile for academic performance. In 2013, Paden City High School, received Full Accreditation Status by the W.V. Board of Education following a positive assessment of PCHS by the W.V. Office of Education Performance Audits as well as a rating as a WV Success School, an honor given to only three schools in RESA 6, and the only high school in Wetzel County to receive this honor. Paden City High School has several West Virginia State Champions, Ohio Valley Athletic Conference Champions (OVAC), and Mason-Dixon Champions.

The current structure that houses Paden City High School was completed for the fall 1976 classes, with an addition and remodeling project completed in 1988. The 1976 structure was built after the original structure that was built as Paden City Junior High in 1922, burned in January 1975, more information on the current and past buildings is included below. After Paden City Middle School, which housed grades 6-8, was closed in 1993, grade 6 became part of Paden City Elementary School, and grades 7 and 8 became part of the high school.

== History ==
=== Establishment ===
Educational opportunity was first offered in Paden City in a proverbial little red schoolhouse. This one-room brick building was located in the Wetzel County part of town, just across the highway from what is now the Wesleyan Methodist church. The second school was built on the back of the present school site. It was a four-room building of wood frame construction. About 1916 the school population had increased to such an extent that the four-room building was inadequate, and the J.R. Henthorne Building on Main Street was secured for school purposes. A few years later the Kannan Building on Fourth Avenue was rented since it afforded more space than the Henthorne Building.

The temporary building being very unsatisfactory created a strong sentiment favoring the construction of a new school building. Since similar crowding conditions existed in the schools of other Magnolia District communities, a bond issue for financing a district building program was laid on December 14, 1922. The building was erected and the interior partially completed at a cost of less than $70,000. It was further completed as need for space arose. During this period of expansion the State Department of Education authorized the establishment of the "Junior High School," with special permission being granted to include the tenth grade. Because the Tyler/Wetzel county line divides Paden City, juniors and seniors living on the Tyler side of the line had to travel to Sistersville and attend Sistersville High School, and juniors and seniors living on the Wetzel side of the line had to travel to Magnolia High School in New Martinsville. Paden City found friends competing against friends and even brothers against brothers in athletic competitions.

During the years that the Junior High School served the educational needs of the community, parents and students envisioned the time when the change at the eleventh grade level would not have to be made. In 1949 a concerted effort with a vision of the formation of a four-year high school at Paden City was made. That effort was led by Ray Berger, Owen McKay, Jess Brown, Guy Nichols, and Dr. R.F. Miller. The state superintendent of schools approved the plan, and after three appearances Paden City finally had the high school it had long sought. The Wetzel County Board of Education approved the measure by a 3-2 vote. The measure was approved by the Wetzel County Board of Education only after the Paden City Lions Club volunteered to purchase typewriters and office equipment; and Owen McKay, speaking for the community, told the board of education that the citizens of Paden City would buy an athletic field for the school.

The annual Labor Day Celebration was started to raise money for facilities at the new school. Workers at Paden City Pottery and Paden City Glass gave money through payroll deduction plans to support the school. The amount workers gave may only have been $2 per week, but at a salary of $15 per week, that was a sacrifice. They did it because Paden City kids needed a school at Paden City. No state or county tax dollars were used to purchase or build the athletic field. As there was approximately a four-foot drop from one end of the property, which was to be used for an athletic field, to the other, the field had to be leveled off. A fence measuring 1,830 feet was installed, the field house was built, and bleachers were put up. It was estimated that it would take 80 months to pay the $17,300 cost of the land. In actuality the citizens of Paden City made the final loan payment in just 24 months. The light towers for the field arrived in a most unusual way. After raising $25,000 for the lights and the towers, they came by rail car to the south end of Paden City. A general call went out, and about 400 people carried the equipment, by hand, to the field. Men would work eight to ten hours a day at local industries and then work another six hours at the field to build bleachers.

In the fall of 1951, Paden City "High School" opened its doors for the first time. in Ray Berger, one of the moving forces behind the formation of the high school, became the first principal. In 1952, more than a year before the 1954 U.S. Supreme Court ruling Brown vs. the Board of Education, which integrated southern schools, Paden City High School was an integrated educational institution.

=== 1975 fire destroys PCHS ===
On January 8, 1975 fire destroyed the 53-year-old high school building. However, while the body of the building lay cremated, churches and other institutions provided space for classrooms. Classes were held in the PCHS Gymnasium, which was not destroyed by the fire, the Paden City Christian Church, Paden City Church of the Nazarene, St. Paul's Methodist Church, and the Mater Dolorosa Catholic Church. Portable classroom trailers were also brought in and placed behind Berger Football Field. Less than one week of classes was missed due to the fire.

=== New building (1977) ===
Rumor that the school would not be rebuilt after the fire brought such a public outcry that construction of a new school began almost immediately.

On May 1, 1977, the dedication of the present Paden City High School was held. The ceremony featured various guests, including Jack Dulany, superintendent of Wetzel County Schools; Ira Satterfield, the current principal of PCHS; Board Member Tim Miller; Rev. John Negley; and featured speaker, James Jeffers of the Class of 1964. The new building with its definite modern style shows no resemblance of its predecessor but has nonetheless become a landmark in Paden City and the school continues to be a source for community pride in Paden City.

The new building departed slightly from the then-popular "open classroom" design of the 1970s era. The building features a spacious hall on the ground floor with a two-story open ceiling giving a view of the classrooms on both floors at once. The second floor consists of four major classrooms with another four down the hall. The gymnasium, band room, and shop rooms were not destroyed, although damaged, as they were protected by a firewall. The school also featured "wall-to-wall" carpeting, something unheard of in public schools until the 1970s. In a short time trophy cases were installed on the first floor by various parents and the Paden City Boosters Association. Later, the Sprouse family donated trophy cases for the second floor commons area for athletic awards and the Paden City Band Patrons along with the family of John Nail (former Band Director) and the Paden City Boosters Association installed more cases on the second floor and in the band room to house the trophies of the Paden City High School Band.

Later in 1986, a bond levy in Wetzel County was passed giving money to re-build the other three county high schools and to add the addition of the Multi-Purpose Building to Paden City High School along with many other upgrades and remodeling projects within the main building. The Multi-Purpose Building complete with a cafeteria, common area and auditorium was completed and opened in 1988.

=== Areas of PCHS named in Honor of Notable People ===
Band Room- John Nail Band Room, Paden City Band Director 1982-1990

Fine Arts Wing- R. E. Ed Hood Fine Arts Wing, Paden City Band Director 1959-1982

Football Dressing Room - Coach Hen Healy coached 1960 basketball team to a WV State Championship and in 1970 led his team to a WV State football title.

Football Field- (Ray) Berger Field, First PCHS Principal

Gymnasium- Bob Burton Gymnasium, long-time Paden City basketball coach who captured two state championships (1973 and 1987)

Multi-Purpose Building- Jess Brown Hall, Former Principal

=== Paden City High School saved in 2010 ===
In early spring of 2009, rumors started that Paden City High School would be merged with another high school in the Wetzel County School System. Every 10 years, West Virginia school districts must submit a Continued Education Facilities Plan (CEFP). The plan was constructed by a CEFP committee, made up of selected individuals within Wetzel County. Paden City High School and the City of Paden City had no representation on this committee that recommended the closure of PCHS by fall of 2012. When rumors started, the Paden City Foundation formed "Project Cornerstone" which was made up of community members, PCHS Alumni, and PCHS Supporters. For several months the project worked on fact finding and advertisement for reasons to keep Paden City High School open and operational as a 7-12 high school. (The name "Cornerstone" was chosen because the group believes PCHS is the cornerstone of the Paden City Community.) A public hearing was held in March 2010 with the Wetzel County Board of Education for purposes of getting an idea of how the community felt about the possible closure of Paden City High. 35 individuals spoke on the issue. All 35 expressed that they wanted to see Paden City High School remain open and operational. Well over 1,000 individuals packed the PCHS Gymnasium, including Paden City Citizens, PCHS Alumni, PCHS Parents, PCHS Supporters, Political Officials, also in attendance was over 99% of the Paden City High School Student body as well as many students from Paden City Elementary School. The Paden City High School Band was also in attendance and played the PCHS Alma Mater and Fight Song before the hearing began. On April 19, 2010 the Wetzel County Board of Education voted 5-0 in favor of keeping PCHS open and operational, and to have the CEFP re-written to state that Paden City High School would remain open and not consolidate with another high school in the county district. The Paden City Foundation's "Project Cornerstone" has remained together as a group even after the vote of confidence by the board of education. Project Cornerstone continues to work to raise funds and support to recognize the importance of and ensure the future of Paden City High School and Paden City Elementary School.

== Extracurricular activities ==
=== Athletics ===
The school's mascot is the wildcat, and the school colors are green and white. The Wildcats, as Paden City students are called, inherited their name from a semi-pro football team in Paden City during the 1940s. They had played with such ferocity that they were given then name Wildcats by their coach - a term that endured at the new high school in 1951. Although Paden City High School now uses the wildcat animal, the nickname given by the semi-pro coach was actually in reference to hard working industrial workers that were called "Wildcats" in the industrial revolution. At the time, Paden City had many operating factories and was known as "Paden City- The Industrial Town," a slogan that was used to attract citizens and industry to the town.

PCHS competes in the following WVSSAC sports: football, volleyball, boys and girls basketball, boys and girls track, baseball, softball, golf, cheerleading. PCHS is a conference member of Ohio Valley Athletic Conference (OVAC) and Mason-Dixon Conference. For Boys and Girls Track, PCHS is a member of the Ohio River Valley Track League and for basketball (boys and girls) PCHS is a member of the Hometown Invitational Tournament which is a group of smaller "hometown" schools in West Virginia that participate in a tournament across the state and crowns champions annually.

Despite being one of the smallest public schools in the state, Paden City High School has a history of athletic excellence capturing multiple state championships including football in 1970 and 1979, boys basketball in 1960, 1973, 1987, and cheerleading in 1994 and 1998.

== Alumni ==
=== Notable alumni ===
- Mark Funkhouser, former mayor of Kansas City, Missouri, current publisher of Governing (magazine) and director of the Governing Institute
- W. Craig Broadwater
- Clark Barnes
- Jeff Casteel

== See also ==
- Wetzel County Schools
- Paden City Elementary School, Paden City High's Feeder School
