= Wahama High School =

Public school in Mason, West Virginia, United States

Coordinates: 39°0′36″N 82°2′12″W

Wahama Junior/Senior High School
- 1 White Falcon Drive; Mason, West Virginia 25260; United States

Information
- Type: Public
- Motto: "Changing the future... one child at a time."
- Established: 1925
- School district: Mason County Schools
- Principal: Melissa Van Meter
- Teaching staff: 26.00 (FTE)
- Grades: 7 to 12
- Enrollment: 369 (2023–2024)
- Student to teacher ratio: 14.19
- Colours: Red and white
- Athletics conference: LKC
- Mascot: White Falcon
- Team name: Wahama White Falcons
- Website: http://wahama.maso.k12.wv.us

Wahama Junior/Senior High School is located in Mason, West Virginia, United States. It is the second-largest high school in the county. It is a part of Mason County Schools.

The school was established in 1925, and its unusual name was derived from the first two letters of each of the three area districts: Waggener, Hartford, and Mason. Classes were held in the International Order of Odd Fellows building in Mason, as well as a building on the lot of the old Mason Grade School until 1931, when a new building opened on the land where the school now sits. Originally, the school housed only grades 9 through 12. Students from the Graham and New Haven districts in the county also began attending the high school.

The school's stadium was built in 1948 and named Bachtel Stadium.

In 1962, the school's enrollment had increased and it was necessary to add a brand new junior high building. By the 1971–1972 school year, it was decided that the newer junior high building would become the new high school and vice versa.

The old high school building served as the junior high until 1989. The cafeteria was still connected to the building until 1996 when a new one was built. The junior high building was demolished in 1999.

== Athletics ==
The White Falcons belong to the West Virginia Secondary School Activities Commission (WVSSAC) and the LKC. From 2010 to the 2019–2020 school year, the White Falcons were members of the Tri-Valley Conference, an athletic conference located in southeastern Ohio. The conference is divided into two divisions based on school size. The Ohio Division features the larger schools and the Hocking Division features the smaller schools, which included Wahama. Wahama was the first school located in the State of West Virginia to join the Tri-Valley Conference.

=== Fight song ===
"Stand Up and Cheer" is the fight song of the Wahama White Falcons.

=== Football ===
Football is the most popular sport at Wahama and draws great crowd support each fall. Wahama has repeatedly clinched post-season playoff berths to become one of the top programs in single A, with the first appearance in the 1986–87 school year. The 2001 and 2003 teams made final four appearances and both times fell to the Moorefield Yellowjackets, led by Reed Williams and company.

In 2010, Wahama posted a 10–0 regular season and their first league championship in their first year of being a member of the TVC Hocking division. They won their first three playoff games with victories over St. Marys (19–0), East Hardy (73–38), and Wirt County (31–14). Wahama lost the championship game to Wheeling Central Catholic in the school's first appearance at the Super Six at Wheeling Island Stadium.

Two years later, in its second Super Six appearance, Wahama battled to overtime against Madonna. The White Falcons converted a two-point conversion to win the school's first state title, by a score of 43–42. In the middle of the 2013 season, longtime coach Ed Cromley retired and a new coach took his place.

=== Baseball ===
The Wahama High School baseball team has a rich history. The baseball team has five WVSSAC state titles; the first was in 1996 when the White Falcons defeated the Van High School Bulldogs 3–2. They claimed their second title in 1998 by defeating the Moorefield High School Yellowjackets 9–4. Their third title was won in 2015 by defeating the Man High School Hillbillies 7–0. They also have numerous regional and sectional titles under their belt. Their fourth title Was won in 2016 by defeating Wheeling Central Catholic 5–4, making them back-to-back state champions. Their fifth title was won in 2023 by defeating Tyler Consolidated 10–0.

== Notable alumni ==
- Mel Clark, former Major League Baseball player for Philadelphia Phillies and Detroit Tigers

== See also ==
- Ohio High School Athletic Conferences
