= Paden (surname) =

Paden is a surname. Notable people with the surname include:

- Clifton Paden ("John Emerson"), American silent filmmaker, 1874–1956
- Khalil Paden, American football player
- Cline Paden, American evangelist and missionary, (1919–2007)
- Jurica Pađen, Croatian musician
- Frank Paden and Johnny Paden (of The Marvelows)
