= Point Pleasant High School (West Virginia) =

School in Point Pleasant, West Virginia, United States

Coordinates: 38°52′50″N 82°7′16″W

Location
- 280 Scenic Drive; Point Pleasant, (Mason County), West Virginia 25550; United States

Information
- Type: Public high school
- Motto: We are better together!
- School district: Mason County Schools
- Principal: William Cottrill
- Staff: 65.50 (FTE)
- Grades: 7–12
- Enrollment: 1,026 (2023-24)
- Student to teacher ratio: 15.66
- Colors: Black and red
- Mascot: Black Knight
- Website: Point Pleasant Junior/Senior High School

Point Pleasant Junior/Senior High School is located in Point Pleasant, West Virginia. It is located in Mason County and is the largest high school in the county. It is operated by Mason County Schools.

== History ==
=== Early Foundations (1794–1889) ===
The origins of education in Point Pleasant date back to the town's establishment in 1794, when landowner Thomas Lewis designated a lot for a school building at the junction of the Ohio and Great Kanawha Rivers. A log structure was initially erected to serve as both a school and a church. This was eventually replaced by a frame building, and in 1848, citizens raised funds via subscription to construct a two-room brick schoolhouse on the same site.

With the establishment of the West Virginia public school system in 1865, this "subscription school" was incorporated into the Mason County district. On February 24, 1887, the West Virginia Legislature created the Independent School District of Point Pleasant, separating it from the Lewis District to manage the educational needs of the growing population.

=== Development of the High School (1890–1915) ===
While provisions for secondary education existed early on, Point Pleasant High School was not formally organized until 1890. The school graduated its first class of four students in 1892. In 1897, the curriculum was reorganized into a formal four-year course of study, and the high school was established as a separate department, though it continued to share facilities with the elementary grades.

To accommodate rising enrollment, a dedicated cement block building was constructed in the Central Grade schoolyard in 1907. During this period, the curriculum expanded beyond core academics to include music, art, and professionalized record-keeping.

=== Expansion and the Modern Era (1916–1935) ===
In 1916, the school moved into a new, dedicated high school building (occupied through the mid-20th century). During the 1920s, the school underwent significant modernization:

- 1924: The school opened the first "Domestic Science" cottage in West Virginia, designed to teach home economics in a residential setting under the Smith-Hughes Act.
- 1926: A gymnasium was completed through a partnership between private citizens and the City Council. That same year, the school earned accreditation from the North Central Association of Colleges and Schools.
- 1933: Following statewide legislative changes, the Independent District of Point Pleasant was abolished, and the school was integrated into the Mason County unit system.

=== Co-curricular and Academic Recognition ===
The school historically maintained a robust literary and debating culture. The Irving Literary Society, founded in 1898, later split into the Athenian and Olympian societies to foster competition. Between 1920 and 1926, Point Pleasant students frequently placed first in state contests for extemporaneous speech, debate, and oratory.

Other long-standing student organizations included the Tu-Endie-Wei (the school newspaper, which received "All-American" ratings in the 1930s), the Thespian Society, and various athletic programs. By 1935, the school had grown from an initial enrollment of 75 to nearly 400 students, necessitating further facility expansions to accommodate the rural student population brought in by the county's new bus system.

=== Mid-Century Growth (1935–1965) ===
Following its integration into the Mason County unit system in 1933, the school entered a period of steady expansion. By the late 1930s, the curriculum had modernized significantly, with students gaining admission to top-tier universities and West Point without further examination.

The post-war era saw a surge in athletic and academic prominence. Under the leadership of coaches like Bob Schertzer (1952–1965), the football program became a regional powerhouse, notably leading the state in scoring in 1956. This era was characterized by the consolidation of smaller rural schools into the Point Pleasant system, which increased the student body and necessitated a focus on vocational training alongside traditional academics.

=== Modernization and Transition (1966–1999) ===
By the mid-1960s, the aging 1916 building faced overcrowding. This period was marked by the introduction of more diverse specialized programs and the expansion of the "Career Center" concept, which allowed students to gain technical skills alongside their high school diploma.

As the school population fluctuated with the local economy, the administration began shifting toward a comprehensive "Junior/Senior High" model to maximize resources. This era also saw the professionalization of the school's arts and media programs; the school newspaper, Tu-Endie-Wei, and the band programs remained central to the school’s identity, maintaining a presence in state-wide competitions throughout the late 20th century.

In 1999, Opal Morse, who taught science and speech at Point Pleasant High School, was named West Virginia Teacher of the Year. A mentor and coach, she guided numerous speech and debate students to state championships and national-level competition.

=== Facility Overhaul and New Construction (2000–2007) ===
The turn of the millennium brought the most significant physical change to the school since 1916. In response to safety concerns regarding unsecured student travel between various detached campus buildings, Mason County Schools initiated a major renovation and construction project.

In 2006, construction began on a $24 million, 167,000-square-foot facility. The project, designed by Architectural Vision Group, was completed in April 2008. This "Junior/Senior High" complex unified the career center and the high school into a single, secure structure. The design introduced organized traffic flow for buses and cars, communal gathering spots, and modern technology labs, effectively replacing the aging early-20th-century infrastructure.

=== The Junior/Senior High Era (2007–Present) ===
The current era of Point Pleasant High School is defined by its role as a centralized hub for Mason County students in grades 7 through 12. The unified campus model has allowed for greater continuity in both athletics and academics, as junior high students are integrated into the "Big Blacks" school culture earlier.

In recent years, the school has focused on "College and Career Readiness," maintaining strong ties to local industry while expanding Advanced Placement (AP) offerings. The school remains a member of the North Central Association, a streak of accreditation held since 1926. Today, Point Pleasant High School continues to serve as the largest secondary education center in the county, balancing its deep historical roots—including the 18th-century legacy of the Thomas Lewis grant—with 21st-century educational standards.

== Administration and Faculty ==
The principal of Point Pleasant High School is William Cottrill. The assistant principals are Kent Price, James Higginbotham, Chris O'Dell and Cherry Weikle. The guidance counselors are Melissa Barnette, Tiffany Hersman and Diane Foreman.

== Athletics ==
Point Pleasant High School offers many different types of athletics such as baseball, boys and girls basketball, football, golf, boys and girls soccer, softball, boys and girls tennis, boys and girls track and field, and wrestling. Point Pleasant is the smallest Class AAA school in the state of West Virginia. The school's athletes are formally known as the Black Knights (members of the girls' teams are called the Lady Knights), but they are better known by their nickname, the Big Blacks.

Baseball

In 1972, the Point Pleasant High School baseball team made it to the state tournament, losing in the first round to Parkersburg High by a score of 4-0. The Big Blacks waited 35 seasons before making it back to the state tourney, finally doing so in 2007 under the guidance of head coach James Higginbotham. They also lost in the first round that year to Grafton High School by a score of 4-3. In the 2008 season, despite a mediocre overall record of 19-16, the Big Blacks fought their way all the way to the state championship game against Logan High School. However, they would lose the game, 13-3.

Basketball

The boys basketball team at PPHS has a rich tradition of winning sectional titles. They have won 17 sectional titles: 1933, 1936, 1937, 1939, 1940, 1943, 1947, 1948, 1955, 1956, 1959, 1960, 1962, 1964, 1966, 1975, and most recently in 1996. In 1926, the team made it to the West Virginia AA State Tournament, losing in the championship game to Elkins High. They made it again to the state tournament in the 1958/59 season.

Football

The Point Pleasant Big Blacks have a rich tradition of football that dates back to 1921. From 1921 to 2019, the Big Blacks have 16 State Playoff appearances, 9 quarterfinals, 3 semifinals, 1 runner up, and 8 undefeated regular seasons. From 1975-2006, there was one man patrolling the sidelines at Sanders Memorial Stadium, Steve Safford.

Boys' Soccer

The Point Pleasant boys' soccer team achieved a historic milestone in 2023 by capturing the school’s first-ever State Championship in a dramatic penalty shootout victory over Charleston Catholic. The game went to penalty kicks after being tied 1-1 in regulation, where the Point Pleasant boys won 4-3 after being down 3-1 at the midway point. This was the first soccer championship in school history. This championship followed a dominant postseason run where the team secured both the Sectional and Regional titles. The program has consistently appeared in the state tournament throughout the 2020s, building on a foundation of multiple sectional championships in the previous decade. Known for a disciplined defensive style, the "Big Blacks" have produced several First-Team All-State selections and are currently ranked among the premier small-school programs in West Virginia.

Girls' Soccer

The "Lady Knights" soccer program has emerged as a regional powerhouse, maintaining a streak of dominance in Region IV, Section 1 with numerous consecutive sectional titles. The team reached its competitive peak in 2021, advancing to the state championship game to finish as the State Runner-up. The program followed this achievement with back-to-back State Semifinal appearances in 2022 and 2023, cementing their status as a top-four program in the state. The Lady Knights are particularly noted for their high-powered offense, having produced multiple players who have surpassed the 100-career-goal milestone and earned All-State honors.

Softball

The softball team at PPHS has won two state titles. The first, in 1998, while being coached by Larry Wright. After that first title they continued to have success. At the end of the 90's the team took on new leadership under Danny Dewhurst. Dewhurst would end his first stint with the Lady Knights in 2004. That year the team posted an amazing 25-5 record, falling a game short of the state tournament.

Wrestling

Over the last 5 years, the wrestling team at PPHS has been the most successful team at the school. In 2006, they placed third at the state tournament and in 2007, placed second behind Oak Glen High School, who has won the AA/A title for ten years in a row. They went on to finish Runner Up in 2008 & 2009. The past success can be attributed to West Virginia Hall of Fame Coach Jack Cullen.

In 2010 Coach John Bonecutter took over the Wrestling Program and took them to the next level by winning the state championship, ending Oak Glen run of 13 straight AA/A State Wrestling Titles. Point Pleasant went on to win two more state titles in 2011 & 2012 under Coach Bonecutter making it three in a row. In 2013 Point Pleasant was moved back to AAA to compete in the large schools division and finished 6th at the State Tournament, the highest AAA finish in school history. Coach Bonecutter has been named National Wrestling Coaches Association Coach of the Year in both 2010 & 2012.

State Tournament Team Finish: 1974 - 43rd * Class AAA 1975 - 21st 1976 - 7th 1977 - 17th 1978 - Did not Score 1979 - 15th 1980 - 13th 1981 - 28th 1982 - 16th 1983 - 19th 1984 - 26th 1985 - 19th 1986 - Did not Score 1987 - 27th 1988 - 32nd 1989 - 38th 1990 - 27th 1991 - 34th 1992 - 30th 1993 - 34th 1994 - 21st 1995 - 15th 1996 - 14th 1997 - 11th 1998 - 7th 1999 - 13th 2000 - 22nd 2001 - 15th 2002 - 20th 2003 - 9th * First year in AA/A 2004 - 8th 2005 - 6th 2006 - 3rd 2007 - 2nd 2008 - 2nd 2009 - 2nd 2010 - 1st 2011 - 1st 2012 - 1st 2013 - 6th * First year back in AAA 2014 - 6th

Hall of Fame

In 2007, the first class of the Point Pleasant High School Athletics Hall of Fame was inducted. The inductees were:

Pete Young- Young was an important cog for the 1956 football team which led the state in scoring. He scored a total of 23 touchdowns and 23 two-point conversions. He was a multi-year letterman in both football and basketball.

Jerome VanMeter- VanMeter was the second head football coach in the history of Point Pleasant and one of the greatest, if not the greatest high school coach in West Virginia history. He was the coach at Point Pleasant from 1924–1928, and he coached football, boys basketball, and track. He is most remembered at Point Pleasant for the 1925/26 basketball team that finished as the runner-up in the state and was nationally acclaimed. He moved on to Beckley High School after his brief stint at Point Pleasant. While he was at Beckley, he won 222 football games along with 3 state championships, 674 basketball games and six state championships. He is a member of the National High School Sports Hall of Fame and the West Virginia High School Sports Hall of Fame.

Paul "Denny" Wedge Jr.- Wedge excelled in three sports. He was selected to the All-State baseball team as a pitcher and an outfielder his senior year. He held the school scoring record in basketball while being selected to the All-Regional team and being an Honorable Mention to the All-State team. He was a quarterback and made All-Conference his junior and senior years. He was also the punter and he led the conference in punting his senior year. He received a four-year scholarship to play football and basketball at Western Kentucky College.

Ed Sommer- Sommer was an offensive tackle and defensive end for the Big Blacks from 1949-51. He was selected to play in the North South All-Star game and received a four-year scholarship to West Virginia University. He lettered as a freshman before enlisting in the army for two years. Upon returning to WVU, he played for three years as an offensive tackle, being named a co-captain his senior season.

Bill Smith- Smith played 3 years of basketball and was the team's leading scorer during his junior and senior years. In those two years, he scored a total of 874 points. His 52 points in single game in 1957 are the most ever by a Point Pleasant High School player. For his efforts, he was selected to the All-State team his senior year.

Bob Schertzer- Schertzer was the football coach at Point Pleasant from 1952-65. He had a career record of 74-56-4. In his career, he had many outstanding teams including 1956 (9-1), 1961 (9-1), and 1962 (8-0-1).

Jack Rogers- Rogers was a coach, sportswriter, and devoted fan of Point Pleasant athletics for over 40 years. He became the youngest editor in the state of West Virginia when he was hired by the Point Pleasant Register. He was the baseball coach for 24 years and compiled a record of 182-121. He published over 10,000 articles for the Register while he was a sportswriter. He directed the Little League baseball program for 8 years and a field there is named after him.

Jimmy Lewis- No other Point Pleasant athlete has ever equaled Lewis' accomplishments on the baseball diamond. He had a 32-game hitting streak, which was a state record at the time that spanned almost three seasons. In 1958, he posted a .556 batting average, with 25 hits, 19 runs scored, 4 homers, and in one inning had 6 rbis. In 1957 he was named to the 3rd team All-State and he followed that up with 1st team honors in '58. In addition to his accolades in baseball, he was named the football team's Most Valuable Player his senior season.

Charles "Happy" Kenny- Kenny was Point Pleasant's version of Jim Thorpe, as he excelled in all athletic events. He was a skilled football and baseball player, as well as a good wrestler. In 1950, famed coach Jerome VanMeter said that Kenny, who captained VanMeter's 1924 squad was "the greatest football player I ever coached. He could do everything anyone else could do, and do it better!".

H.R. "Dick" Herrig- Herrig played on the most prolific football team in school history. He scored 16 touchdowns as a junior and 17 his senior year. He was awarded the MVP award as a senior. He was named to the Honorable Mention All-State and All-American teams as a senior. He played four years as a forward in basketball as well as three years as a center-fielder in baseball. Upon graduating, he was awarded a full, four-year scholarship to West Virginia University.

== Notable Coaches ==
Point Pleasant Junior/Senior High School has been led by several hall-of-fame-caliber coaches who have shaped the school’s athletic identity over the last century.

=== Wrestling ===
- Jack Cullen: A West Virginia Wrestling Hall of Fame inductee, Cullen served as head coach for 26 years (1983–2009). He is credited with building the "Mason County Youth Wrestling League," which became the feeder system for the school's modern dominance. He finished his career with 307 dual victories and was an assistant during the school’s first state title in 2010.
- John Bonecutter: The architect of the current wrestling dynasty, Bonecutter has led the Big Blacks to nine Class AA state championships (2010–2012, 2019–2022, 2024–2025). Under his leadership, the program has produced multiple four-time individual state champions and has consistently ranked as the top wrestling program in West Virginia.

=== Football ===
- Jerome Van Meter: One of the most legendary coaches in West Virginia history, Van Meter led the Big Blacks from 1924 to 1928. He is most famous for leading the 1925–26 basketball team to a state runner-up finish and national acclaim before moving to Beckley to win nine combined state titles in football and basketball.
- Bob Schertzer: Coached the football program from 1952 to 1965, compiling a 74–56–4 record. He led several of the school's most celebrated historic teams, including the 9–1 squad of 1956 and the undefeated 8–0–1 team in 1962.
- David Darst: In 17 seasons as head coach, Darst transformed the Big Blacks into a perennial playoff contender. He led the team to a 12–1 record in 2011 and reached the state semifinals three times. He retired in 2025 as one of the most successful coaches in school history.

=== Soccer and Baseball ===
- Chip Wood: The head coach of the boys' soccer program, Wood led the team to its first-ever WVSSAC State Championship in 2023. He has also secured four consecutive regional titles (2020–2023) and multiple state runner-up finishes.
- Chris Errett: Led the girls' soccer program during its most successful era, including the 2021 season where the Lady Knights finished as the Class AA/A State Runner-up.
- Jack Rogers: A fixture in Point Pleasant athletics for over 40 years, Rogers coached the baseball team for 24 years, compiling 182 victories. The local Little League field is named in his honor.

== Fine and Performing Arts ==
=== Music Department ===
The school’s music program is a cornerstone of its extracurricular identity, comprising a competitive marching band, concert bands, and several choral ensembles.

- Black Knight Marching Band: Known for its rigorous competition schedule, the marching band has earned significant accolades in the 2020s. In 2023, the band was named the "Marco Division" Grand Champion at the Tri-State Marching Championships at Marshall University, sweeping captions for Best Color Guard, Visual, Music, and General Effect. In 2025, the band's show, "Welcome to the New Age," earned Division II Grand Champion honors at the Ripley Viking Fest and swept all Class B awards at the Huntington "Thunder on the Hill" competition. The band is currently under the direction of Benjamin Loudin.
  - A defining tradition of the Point Pleasant High School music department is the Black Knight Revue, an annual variety show and musical showcase that reached its 56th consecutive year in 2026. Established by former band director Gary Stewart, the Revue was designed as a "pops" style concert that allowed the marching band, concert ensembles, and individual student performers to showcase their talents outside the traditional field or concert hall setting. Since its inception in 1971, the event has grown into a major community production, featuring a blend of contemporary hits, classic Broadway numbers, and jazz standards. It serves as one of the school’s primary fundraisers for the band program and is widely considered one of the longest-running and most successful high school musical reviews in the state of West Virginia.
  - The foundation of the modern band program was largely built by Gary Stewart, who served as the director of bands at Point Pleasant for 34 years before retiring from the high school in 2001. Stewart’s impact was formally recognized in 2019 when he was inducted into the West Virginia Marching Band Directors Hall of Fame. His tenure saw the creation of the Black Knight Revue and the establishment of a consistent competitive presence in West Virginia and Ohio. Following Stewart, the program continued to thrive under subsequent directors, Gary Burdette, Jeff Hilbert, and Benjamin Loudin.
- Choral Program: The choir department has seen a major revitalization in recent years. Students are regularly selected for the West Virginia All-State Chorus and regional honor choirs. In 2022 two students were selected into the National Association for Music Education All National Choir, and in 2026 a student auditioned into the All American Choir that is set to perform in France to commemorate D-Day. The school has three choirs: Chamber Choir, High School Choir, and Jr. High Choir. The choirs are currently under the direction of Ethan Bartlett.

=== Theatre and Visual Arts ===
- Visual Arts: The fine arts curriculum includes 2D and 3D design, with student work frequently showcased at the Mason County Schools Art Show. Students have received "Outstanding Achievement" honors at regional teen arts festivals for painting, photography, and mixed-media sculpture.

== Notable alumni ==
- Virginia Mae Brown, set many "first woman" records.
- Donnie Jones, head coach of the Marshall University men's basketball team.
- Bob Adkins, Green Bay Packers BB/DE/G/LB
- Brereton C. Jones: Former Governor of Kentucky (1991–1995).
- Ben Schwartzwalder: Hall of Fame college football coach, most notably for Syracuse University.
- Leonard S. Echols: Former U.S. Representative from West Virginia
- Karl Probst: Automotive engineer and freelance designer credited with the original design of the Jeep.
- Robert L. Hogg: Former U.S. Representative from West Virginia.
- Ray Stevens: Professional wrestler and member of the WWE Hall of Fame.
- Livia Simpson Poffenbarger: Historian and civic leader who was instrumental in the preservation of the Tu-Endie-Wei State Park.
