= Mason County Schools (West Virginia) =

School district in the United States

Address
- 1 Education Lane Point Pleasant, West Virginia, 25550; United States

District information
- Type: Public
- Grades: PK–12
- Schools: 12
- NCES District ID: 5400780

Students and staff
- Students: 3,554 (2025–2026)
- Teachers: 256.05 (on an FTE basis) (2025–2026)
- Staff: 327.95 (on an FTE basis) (2025–2026)
- Student–teacher ratio: 13.88 (2025–2026)

Other information
- Website: boe.maso.k12.wv.us

Mason County Schools is a school district headquartered in Point Pleasant, West Virginia. It is within Mason County, West Virginia.

== Board of education ==
The Mason County Board of Education governs the school district. Each member has a term of 4 years.

Board members
Role	Name
Board President	Jared Billings
Board Vice President	Meagan Bonecutter
Board Member	Ashley Cossin
Board Member	Bo Burgess
Board Member	Dale Shobe

== Schools ==
=== High schools ===
- Hannan Junior/Senior High School
- Point Pleasant Junior/Senior High School
- Wahama Junior/Senior High School

=== Middle schools ===
- Hannan Junior/Senior High School
- Point Pleasant Junior/Senior High School
- Wahama Junior/Senior High School

=== Elementary schools ===
- Ashton Elementary School
- Beale Elementary School
- Leon Elementary School
- New Haven Elementary School
- Point Pleasant Primary School
- Point Pleasant Intermediate School
- Roosevelt Elementary School

=== Other ===
- Mason County Career Center
