= Hundred, West Virginia =

- Town
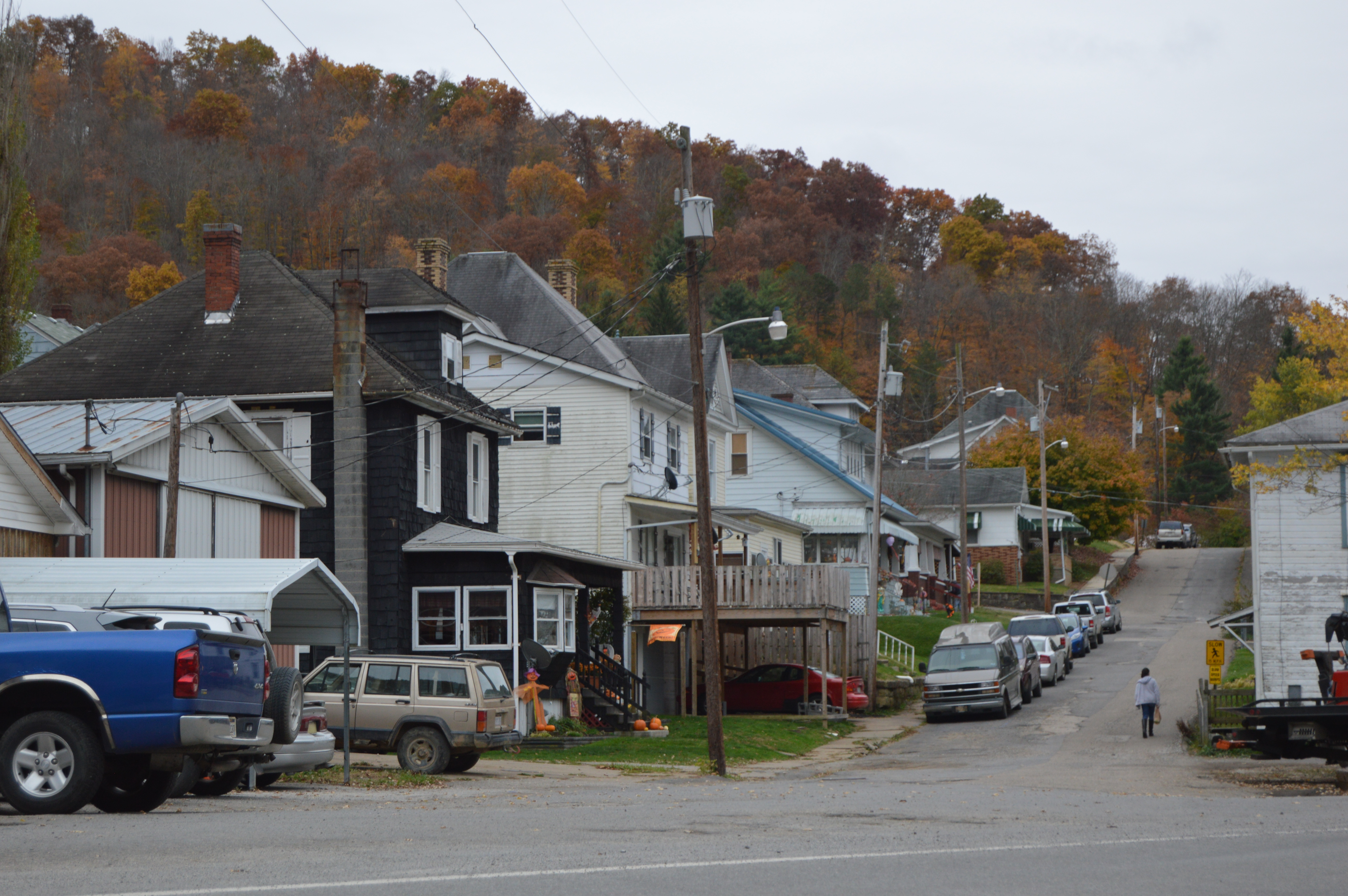
- Cleveland Street houses

- Logo

- Location of Hundred in Wetzel County, West Virginia.
- Coordinates: 39°41′3″N 80°27′26″W
- Country: United States
- State: West Virginia
- County: Wetzel

Area
  - Total: 0.50 sq mi (1.30 km^{2})
  - Land: 0.50 sq mi (1.30 km^{2})
  - Water: 0 sq mi (0.00 km^{2})
- Elevation: 1,027 ft (313 m)

Population (2020)
  - Total: 255
  - Estimate (2021): 248
  - Density: 521.8/sq mi (201.45/km^{2})
- Time zone: UTC-5 (Eastern (EST))
  - Summer (DST): UTC-4 (EDT)
- ZIP code: 26575
- Area code: 304
- FIPS code: 54-39340
- GNIS feature ID: 1540584
- Website: https://www.townofhundred.org/

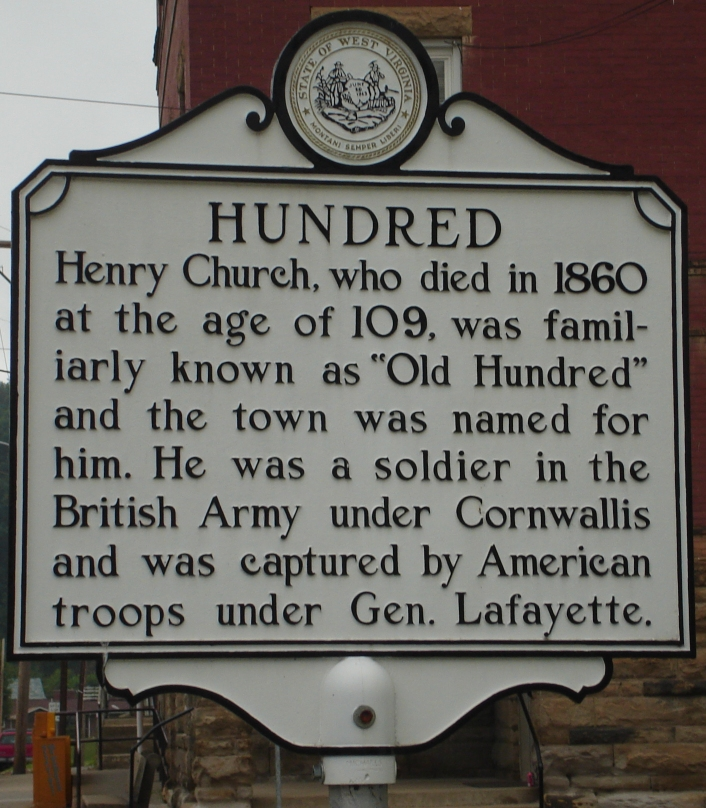
Sign in Hundred, WV

Hundred is a town in Wetzel County, West Virginia, United States. The population was 257 at the 2020 census. It was named for the fact that local resident Henry "Old Hundred" Church was a centenarian. Hundred is the only place in the United States with this name.

== Routes ==
Hundred lies on three main routes, two of them being West Virginia state routes. U.S. Route 250 spreads across the entire length of the town.

West Virginia Route 69 intersects from U.S. 250 and leads to the Pennsylvania state line where it becomes Pennsylvania Route 18, and West Virginia Route 7 intersects from U.S. 250 towards other areas in the county and the state.

== History ==
The community was named in honor of Henry "Old Hundred" Church (1751–1860) and his wife Hannah Church (1754–1860), who were both local centenarians.

== Geography ==
According to the United States Census Bureau, the town has a total area of 0.50 square miles (1.29 km^{2}), all land.

== Demographics ==
Historical population
Census	Pop.	Note	%±
1900	261		—
1910	557		113.4%
1920	710		27.5%
1930	788		11.0%
1940	706		−10.4%
1950	587		−16.9%
1960	475		−19.1%
1970	475		0.0%
1980	485		2.1%
1990	386		−20.4%
2000	344		−10.9%
2010	299		−13.1%
2020	255		−14.7%
2021 (est.)	248	▼	−2.7%
U.S. Decennial Census

=== 2010 census ===
At the 2010 census there were 299 people, 136 households, and 80 families living in the town. The population density was 598.0 inhabitants per square mile (230.9/km^{2}). There were 186 housing units at an average density of 372.0 per square mile (143.6/km^{2}). The racial makeup of the town was 99.0% White and 1.0% from two or more races. Hispanic or Latino of any race were 1.3%.

Of the 136 households 25.7% had children under the age of 18 living with them, 41.2% were married couples living together, 10.3% had a female householder with no husband present, 7.4% had a male householder with no wife present, and 41.2% were non-families. 37.5% of households were one person and 17.6% were one person aged 65 or older. The average household size was 2.20 and the average family size was 2.86.

The median age in the town was 44.1 years. 21.4% of residents were under the age of 18; 9.4% were between the ages of 18 and 24; 20.4% were from 25 to 44; 30.1% were from 45 to 64; and 18.7% were 65 or older. The gender makeup of the town was 50.2% male and 49.8% female.

=== 2000 census ===
At the 2000 census there were 344 people, 146 households, and 83 families living in the town. The population density was 735.8 inhabitants per square mile (282.6/km^{2}). There were 178 housing units at an average density of 380.7 per square mile (146.2/km^{2}). The racial makeup of the town was 97.67% White, 0.87% African American, and 1.45% from two or more races.

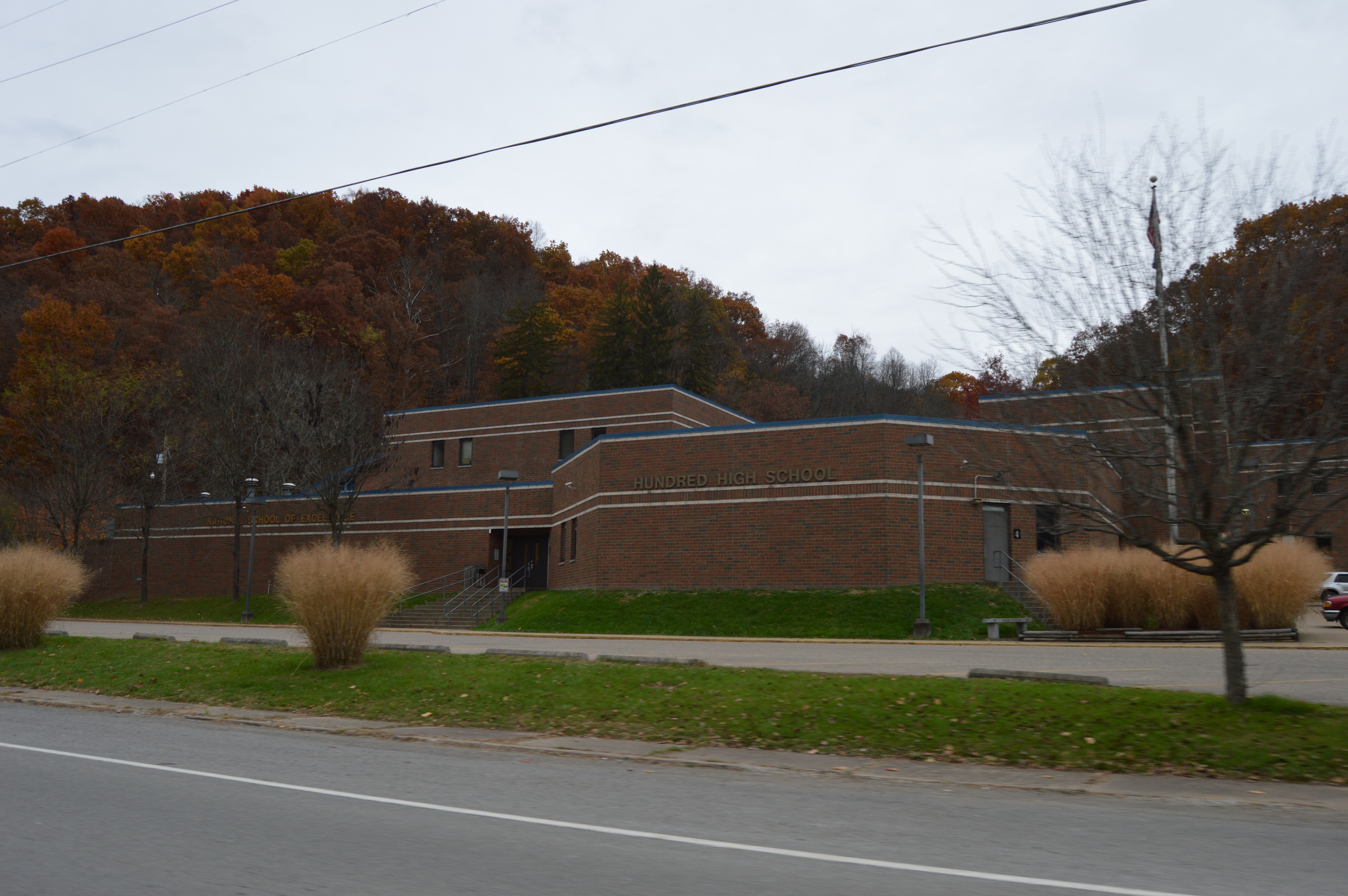
Hundred Heritage School

Of the 146 households 30.1% had children under the age of 18 living with them, 42.5% were married couples living together, 11.6% had a female householder with no husband present, and 42.5% were non-families. 37.7% of households were one person and 20.5% were one person aged 65 or older. The average household size was 2.36 and the average family size was 3.11.

The age distribution was 25.6% under the age of 18, 6.1% from 18 to 24, 24.1% from 25 to 44, 24.7% from 45 to 64, and 19.5% 65 or older. The median age was 43 years. For every 100 females there were 85.9 males. For every 100 females age 18 and over, there were 86.9 males.

The median household income was $25,192 and the median family income was $26,731. Males had a median income of $31,250 versus $18,750 for females. The per capita income for the town was $12,395. About 26.3% of families and 33.6% of the population were below the poverty line, including 30.0% of those under age 18 and 35.2% of those age 65 or over.

== Education ==
Hundred has one school that serves the town, as well as other neighboring areas. This school is Hundred Heritage School, which serves as the elementary and middle schools. Hundred used to recognize themselves as the Hundred Hornets, which was Hundred's team name for sports-related activities, but they no longer have any independent sports teams after the consolidation of Hundred High School.

== Notable people ==
- Edward Lee King, born in Hundred, played major league baseball for seven years and drove in the final run of the 1922 World Series for the victorious New York Giants.
- Henry Lee Church, "Old Hundred" (died 1860) was a British soldier in General Cornwallis' army. His nickname is the origin of the town name.

== See also ==
- List of places with numeric names
