= Pine Grove, West Virginia =

Pine Grove
- Town
- Location of Pine Grove in Wetzel County, West Virginia

- Location within the state of West Virginia
- Coordinates: 39°33′44″N 80°40′52″W
- Country: United States
- State: West Virginia
- County: Wetzel

Area
  - Total: 0.38 sq mi (0.98 km^{2})
  - Land: 0.35 sq mi (0.91 km^{2})
  - Water: 0.027 sq mi (0.07 km^{2})

Population (2020)
  - Total: 363
  - Estimate (2021): 353
  - Density: 1,369.2/sq mi (528.64/km^{2})
- Time zone: UTC-5 (Eastern (EST))
  - Summer (DST): UTC-4 (EDT)
- FIPS code: 54-63892
- Website: local.wv.gov/pinegrove/Pages/default.aspx

Pine Grove is a town in Wetzel County, West Virginia, United States. The population was 363 at the 2020 census. The community was named for a grove of pine trees near the original town site.

The town is one mile north of Dominion Energy's large Hastings Extraction Station, which separates natural gas into various subproducts such as butane. The Hastings plant is unique in that there are traffic signals approximately 0.75 mile away from the plant in either direction to stop traffic in case of an emergency. Pine Grove is also home to Valley High School.

== Geography ==
Pine Grove is located at 39°33′44″N 80°40′52″W (39.562255, -80.681154).

According to the United States Census Bureau, the town has a total area of 0.38 square miles (0.98 km^{2}), of which 0.35 square miles (0.91 km^{2}) is land and 0.03 square miles (0.08 km^{2}) is water.

== Demographics ==
Historical population
Census	Pop.	Note	%±
1910	474		—
1920	797		68.1%
1930	820		2.9%
1940	841		2.6%
1950	877		4.3%
1960	760		−13.3%
1970	630		−17.1%
1980	767		21.7%
1990	701		−8.6%
2000	571		−18.5%
2010	552		−3.3%
2020	363		−34.2%
2021 (est.)	638	▲	75.8%
U.S. Decennial Census

=== 2010 census ===
At the 2010 census there were 552 people, 223 households, and 152 families living in the town. The population density was 1,577.1 inhabitants per square mile (608.9/km^{2}). There were 245 housing units at an average density of 700.0 per square mile (270.3/km^{2}). The racial makeup of the town was 98.9% White, 0.2% Native American, 0.7% from other races, and 0.2% from two or more races. Hispanic or Latino people of any race were 0.7%.

Of the 223 households 34.5% had children under the age of 18 living with them, 50.7% were married couples living together, 13.0% had a female householder with no husband present, 4.5% had a male householder with no wife present, and 31.8% were non-families. 27.4% of households were one person and 12.5% were one person aged 65 or older. The average household size was 2.48 and the average family size was 2.98.

The median age in the town was 41.2 years. 23.4% of residents were under the age of 18; 10.2% were between the ages of 18 and 24; 23.1% were from 25 to 44; 31.5% were from 45 to 64; and 12% were 65 or older. The gender makeup of the town was 49.1% male and 50.9% female.

=== 2000 census ===
At the 2000 census, there were 571 people, 233 households, and 165 families living in the town. The population density was 1,480.6 inhabitants per square mile (565.3/km^{2}). There were 251 housing units at an average density of 650.8 per square mile (248.5/km^{2}). The racial makeup of the town was 99.30% White, 0.18% Asian, and 0.53% from two or more races.

Of the 233 households 30.9% had children under the age of 18 living with them, 55.4% were married couples living together, 10.7% had a female householder with no husband present, and 28.8% were non-families. 24.9% of households were one person and 12.9% were one person aged 65 or older. The average household size was 2.45 and the average family size was 2.90.

The age distribution was 25.0% under the age of 18, 8.8% from 18 to 24, 25.7% from 25 to 44, 25.0% from 45 to 64, and 15.4% 65 or older. The median age was 39 years. For every 100 females, there were 86.6 males. For every 100 females age 18 and over, there were 83.7 males.

The median household income was $25,769 and the median family income was $30,227. Males had a median income of $36,250 versus $23,750 for females. The per capita income for the town was $13,699. About 19.5% of families and 22.6% of the population were below the poverty line, including 28.7% under the age of 18 and 4.4% ages 65 or older.
