= Paden City, West Virginia =

City in West Virginia, US

- City
- Location of Paden City in Tyler County, West Virginia.
- Coordinates: 39°36′13″N 80°56′1″W
- Country: United States
- State: West Virginia
- Counties: Wetzel, Tyler
- Incorporated: 1916

Area
  - Total: 0.85 sq mi (2.19 km^{2})
  - Land: 0.85 sq mi (2.19 km^{2})
  - Water: 0 sq mi (0.00 km^{2})
- Elevation: 659 ft (201 m)

Population (2020)
  - Total: 2,541
  - Estimate (2021): 2,478
  - Density: 2,763.1/sq mi (1,066.82/km^{2})
- Time zone: UTC-5 (Eastern (EST))
  - Summer (DST): UTC-4 (EDT)
- ZIP code: 26159
- Area code: 304
- FIPS code: 54-61636
- GNIS feature ID: 1555291
- Website: cityofpadencity.com

Paden City is a city in Tyler and Wetzel counties in the U.S. state of West Virginia, along the Ohio River. It was incorporated in 1916. The population was 2,550 at the 2020 census.

== History ==
The town was named for Pennsylvania-born Obediah Paden (1755-1822), a local landowner. Nearby Paden Island and Paden Fork were also named for this individual, and the entire region, when owned by Paden, was known as Paden's Bottom.

The Paden City Pottery Company was established in 1911 by a European, John Lessel. He started his company there because Paden City had large clay deposits. At one time the company employed over 400 people. It made beautiful pottery and quality sets of dishes. It closed in 1950 but its products are still available for sale on many websites selling vintage dishware.

== Geography ==
Paden City is located at 39°36′13″N 80°56′1″W (39.603571, -80.933683).

According to the United States Census Bureau, the city has a total area of 0.85 square miles (2.20 km^{2}), all land.

== Demographics ==
Historical population
Census	Pop.	Note	%±
1920	1,705		—
1930	2,281		33.8%
1940	2,215		−2.9%
1950	2,588		16.8%
1960	3,137		21.2%
1970	3,674		17.1%
1980	3,671		−0.1%
1990	2,862		−22.0%
2000	2,860		−0.1%
2010	2,633		−7.9%
2020	2,541		−3.5%
2021 (est.)	2,478		−2.5%
U.S. Decennial Census

=== 2020 census ===
As of the 2020 census, Paden City had a population of 2,541. The median age was 44.2 years. 20.9% of residents were under the age of 18 and 22.5% of residents were 65 years of age or older. For every 100 females there were 94.9 males, and for every 100 females age 18 and over there were 90.9 males age 18 and over.

0.0% of residents lived in urban areas, while 100.0% lived in rural areas.

There were 1,092 households in Paden City, of which 27.6% had children under the age of 18 living in them. Of all households, 46.3% were married-couple households, 16.8% were households with a male householder and no spouse or partner present, and 29.5% were households with a female householder and no spouse or partner present. About 29.3% of all households were made up of individuals and 14.5% had someone living alone who was 65 years of age or older.

There were 1,225 housing units, of which 10.9% were vacant. The homeowner vacancy rate was 1.3% and the rental vacancy rate was 11.9%.

Racial composition as of the 2020 census
Race	Number	Percent
White	2,399	94.4%
Black or African American	3	0.1%
American Indian and Alaska Native	7	0.3%
Asian	5	0.2%
Native Hawaiian and Other Pacific Islander	0	0.0%
Some other race	6	0.2%
Two or more races	121	4.8%
Hispanic or Latino (of any race)	23	0.9%

=== 2010 census ===
As of the census of 2010, there were 2,633 people, 1,143 households, and 775 families living in the city. The population density was 3,097.6 inhabitants per square mile (1,196.0/km^{2}). There were 1,267 housing units at an average density of 1,490.6 per square mile (575.5/km^{2}). The racial makeup of the city was 98.8% White, 0.2% African American, 0.2% Native American, 0.1% Asian, and 0.6% from two or more races. Hispanic or Latino of any race were 0.5% of the population.

There were 1,143 households, of which 26.0% had children under the age of 18 living in them, 52.1% were married couples living together, 11.5% had a female householder with no husband present, 4.2% had a male householder with no wife present, and 32.2% were non-families. 27.9% of all households were made up of individuals, and 15% had someone living alone who was 65 years of age or older. The average household size was 2.30 and the average family size was 2.76.

The median age in the city was 44.9 years. 20% of residents were under the age of 18; 7.2% were between the ages of 18 and 24; 22.8% were from 25 to 44; 28.1% were from 45 to 64; and 21.7% were 65 years of age or older. The gender makeup of the city was 47.7% male and 52.3% female.

=== 2000 census ===
As of the census of 2000, there were 2,860 people, 1,183 households, and 843 families living in the city. The population density was 3,228.4 people per square mile (1,240.7/km^{2}). There were 1,300 housing units at an average density of 1,467.5 per square mile (564.0/km^{2}). The racial makeup of the city was 99.34% White, 0.10% African American, 0.10% Native American, 0.10% Asian, and 0.35% from two or more races. Hispanic or Latino of any race were 0.49% of the population.

There were 1,183 households, out of which 29.4% had children under the age of 18 living in them, 58.1% were married couples living together, 9.6% had a female householder with no husband present, and 28.7% were non-families. 26.0% of all households were made up of individuals, and 15.6% had someone living alone who was 65 years of age or older. The average household size was 2.40 and the average family size was 2.86.

In the city, the population was spread out, with 23.3% under the age of 18, 6.6% from 18 to 24, 26.2% from 25 to 44, 25.3% from 45 to 64, and 18.6% who were 65 years of age or older. The median age was 41 years. For every 100 females, there were 89.8 males. For every 100 females age 18 and over, there were 86.6 males.

The median income for a household in the city was $32,940, and the median income for a family was $38,510. Males had a median income of $37,460 versus $18,750 for females. The per capita income for the city was $19,498. About 12.8% of families and 15.1% of the population were below the poverty line, including 20.7% of those under age 18 and 13.4% of those age 65 or over.

== Notable people ==
- Bill Bell, member of the West Virginia House of Delegates from the 8th district
- Jeff Casteel, Football player and coach, West Virginia Mountaineers
- Mark Funkhouser, former mayor of Kansas City, Missouri
- W. Craig Broadwater, Judge of the United States District Court for the Northern District of West Virginia (Federal Judicial Center) and Brigadier General, West Virginia Army National Guard (Department of Defense National Guard Bureau Biography)

== See also ==
- List of cities and towns along the Ohio River
- Paden City High School
