= Coal camps in Raleigh County, West Virginia =

The coal mining communities, or coal towns of Raleigh County, West Virginia were situated to exploit the area's rich coal seams. Many of these towns were located in deep ravines that afforded direct access to the coal through the hillsides, allowing mined coal to be dropped or conveyed downhill to railway lines at the valley floor. Many of these encampments were set up as coal towns, and when their mines closed, the towns vanished. Raleigh County covers portions of three coalfields: the New River Coalfield, the Winding Gulf Coalfield and the Coal River Coalfield. Below is partial listing of known coal towns. Further listings are available here

== New River Coalfield ==
- Cranberry
- Mabscott
- Oswald (abandoned)
- Price Hill
- Raleigh
- Royal (abandoned)
- Skelton
- Sprague
- Stanaford
- Stonewall (abandoned)
- Tamroy (abandoned)
- Terry
- Wickham
- Wright (abandoned)

== Winding Gulf Coalfield ==
- Abney
- Affinity
- Amigo
- Battleship (abandoned)
- Besoco
- Big Stick (abandoned)
- Coal City
- Crab Orchard
- East Gulf
- Eccles
- Fireco
- Glen White
- Helen
- Hot Coal (abandoned)
- Killarney (abandoned)
- Lego
- Lester
- Lillybrook (abandoned)
- Lynwinn (abandoned)
- McAlpin (abandoned)
- Mead
- Metalton (abandoned)
- Pemberton (abandoned)
- Pickshin (abandoned)
- Rhodell
- Royal (abandoned)
- Slab Fork
- Sophia
- Stonecoal Junction
- Stotesbury
- Sullivan
- Tams (abandoned)
- Terry
- Viacovia (abandoned)
- Whitby
- Willibet (abandoned)
- Winding Gulf
- Woodbay (abandoned)

== Coal River Coalfield ==
- Ameagle
- Birchton (abandoned)
- Dorothy
- Edwight (abandoned)
- Eunice
- Marfork (abandoned)
- Montcoal (abandoned)
- Stickney
