= Winding Gulf Coalfield =

Coordinates: 37°41′N 81°14′W

The Winding Gulf Coalfield is located in western Raleigh County and eastern Wyoming County, in southern West Virginia. It is named after the Winding Gulf stream, a tributary of the Guyandotte River. In the early 20th century, it was promoted as the "Billion Dollar Coalfield".

== History ==
The nomadic Native Americans who hunted there for thousands of years ending in the Woodland Period and the early European settlers in the Virginia Colony and the Commonwealth of Virginia were generally aware of the "rock that burns" which lay below the rugged terrain of the mountainous area which became southern West Virginia. However, aside from some personal mines, no commercial value had been realized by the mid 19th century.

Noted British geologist David T. Ansted (1814-1880) was among the early experts hired by potential investors to survey promising coal fields along the New River in southern Virginia in the United States. In 1853, Dr. Ansted helped identify the rich bituminous coal seams which lay there. His work set the stage for a mining boom in the area, where he invested in land in what became the new state of West Virginia in 1863 during the American Civil War (1861-1865).

It took transportation and industrialized techniques to realize the commercial potential. A protégé of Dr. Ansted, William N. Page (1854-1932), became a leading industrialist and developer of iron furnaces, coal mines and railroads in the area, leading and managing such enterprises as the Gauley Mountain Coal Company for absentee investors, many of whom were based overseas in the United Kingdom. Page came to West Virginia to help complete the Chesapeake & Ohio Railway (C&O) between Richmond, Virginia and the Ohio River in the early 1870s, and helped develop branch lines to coal mining facilities. Former West Virginia Governor William A. MacCorkle described him as a man who knew the land "as a farmer knows a field." Beginning in 1898, Page began working on a scheme to expand into the Winding Gulf area, which was also in the sights of the C&O, whose main line ran along the New and Kanawha River Valleys.

The C&O was heavily working the New River Coalfield, and planning expansion into the Winding Gulf region. However, despite efforts to discourage him, Page introduced unwanted competition by what appeared at the time to be mysterious means. In what has become a popular tale of both U.S. railroads and business competition, the story was recorded and told by historian and rail author H. Reid in The Virginian Railway, published in 1961.

It turned out that William Page, who the C&O knew to be a bright man but of apparently limited financial means, had the secret backing of millionaire industrialist Henry Huttleston Rogers (1840-1909). When the large railroads used their power to discourage the Page scheme, Rogers financed an expansion of the Deepwater Railway, originally planned as a West Virginia short line railroad of 80 miles (130 km), into a Class 1 railroad reaching all the way across Virginia over 500 miles (800 km) to become the Virginian Railway. It became a major third coal exporter at Hampton Roads in 1909. Despite the inefficiency of some duplicative facilities, the Winding Gulf Coalfield benefited from the two major railroad outlets, and became one of the most productive in the state.

The mining of coal in the Winding Gulf Coalfield began in the first decade of the 20th century and continues into the 21st century. The coal in this field is a low volatile coal, and the seams of coal that have been mined include Beckley, Pocahontas No. 3, Pocahontas No. 4, and Sewell. This is very high quality bituminous coal rated at approximately 15,000 British thermal units per pound (35 MJ/kg).

== Coal camps ==
Over 50 coal camps (also known as coal towns) were once located there, with independent commercial districts at Sophia and Mullens anchoring the eastern and western ends of the field. By the 21st century many coal camps had partially or completely returned to nature.

Some of the names associated with the Winding Gulf Coalfields are:

- Abney
- Affinity
- Ameagle
- Amigo
- Arnett
- Artie
- Battleship
- Beechwood
- Besoco
- Big Stick
- Black Eagle
- Blue Jay
- Blue Jay 6
- Bolt
- Bud
- Caloric (later named Otsego)
- Cedar
- Coal City
- Cool Ridge
- Corinne
- Covel
- Crab Orchard
- Devils Fork‡
- Eastgulf
- Eccles
- Edwight
- Fireco
- Fitzpatrick
- Garwood
- Glen Rogers
- Glen White
- Helen
- Herndon
- Hollywood
- Hot Coal
- Hotchkiss
- Iroquois
- Itmann
- Jonben
- Josephine
- Killarney
- Lego
- Lester
- Lillybrook
- Lynwinn
- Maben
- MacArthur
- Madeline
- McAlpin
- McVey
- Mead
- Metalton
- Micajah
- Midway
- Montcoal
- Montecarlo
- Mullens
- Odd
- Otsego
- Pemberton
- Pickshin
- Pinepoca
- Ravencliff
- Rhodell
- Sabine
- Skelton
- Slab Fork
- Sophia
- Stickney
- Stephenson
- Stonecoal Junction
- Stotesbury
- Sullivan
- Surveyor
- Tams
- Tralee
- Ury
- VanNess (later named Mead)
- Viacova
- Whitby
- Willibet
- Winding Gulf
- Woodbay
- Woodpeck
- Wyco

== Railroads ==
The company towns were located along Winding Gulf Creek, Stone Coal Creek, upper Piney Creek, Slab Fork, Laurel Fork, Devils Fork, Barkers Creek, and the Guyandotte River. The main railroad in this coalfield, the Virginian Railway (VGN), had branches running along all of these streams.

The Virginian's main line bisected the field as well, in addition to a repair shop and rail yard at Mullens (named the Elmore Yard), which was operated by the Norfolk and Western Railway (N&W) after a 1959 merger. The Chesapeake & Ohio Railway (C&O) also served the eastern part coalfield, but never entered the Wyoming County portion.

== Companies, ethnics ==
Winding Gulf Collaries, Gulf Smokeless Coal Co., C.H. Mead Coal Co., E.E. White Coal Co., and Pemberton Coal and Coke Co. were among the early players in the field. These companies recruited native born whites for employment, but also imported Poles, Italians, and other European immigrants to work in their coal mines. African Americans were hired to work in the coal mines of the Winding Gulf Coalfield as well. By the time the "coal boom" of the late 1970s and early 1980s occurred, Westmoreland Coal Co. and Eastern Associated Coal Co. were the dominant operators and most of the ethnic diversity had disappeared (including polka dances at St. Francis De Sales Catholic Church in Beckley).

== 21st century ==
While millions of tons of coal have been mined from this coalfield, the mineral is still extracted at a few deep and strip mines, and a large International Coal Group deep mine and preparation plant on the edge of Beckley, WV started operations in late 2007.

== See also ==
- Coalfield
- West Virginia
- William N. Page
- New River Coalfield
- Pocahontas Coalfield
