= Norvell, West Virginia =

Norvell
- Unincorporated community
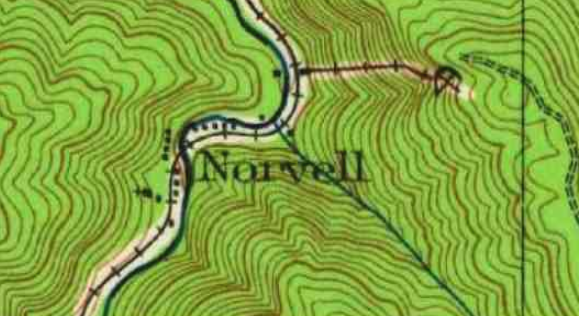
- Norvell, West Virginia, in 1929

- Location within the state of West Virginia Norvell (the United States)
- Coordinates: 37°50′16″N 81°5′50″W
- Country: United States
- State: West Virginia
- County: Raleigh
- Elevation: 1,237 ft (377 m)
- Time zone: UTC-5 (Eastern (EST))
  - Summer (DST): UTC-4 (EDT)
- GNIS ID: 1742879

Norvell was an unincorporated community in Raleigh County, West Virginia, United States.

== Geography ==
Norvell was located on Piney Creek south of McCreery and north of Wright. It was 5 miles (8.0 km) from Beckley, the county seat.

== History ==
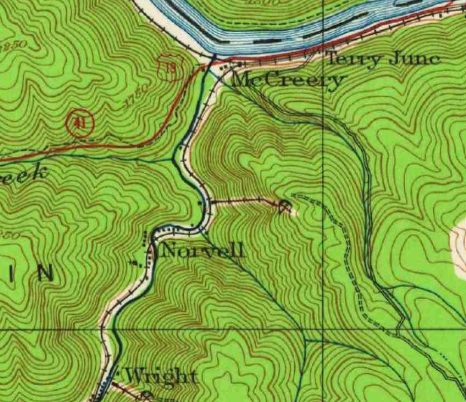
Norvell, McCreery, and Wright, West Virginia, in 1929

Norvell was a stop on the Piney Creek Branch of the Chesapeake and Ohio Railway, between McCreery and Wright. In 1919, the Charleston Chamber of Commerce announced its annual Chamber railroad trade trip through the state; the route included a 15-minute stop in Norvell.

The Fire Creek Coal and Coke Company was located in Norvell, as was Mine #2 of the Wright Coke and Coal Company; this mine had been established in 1903. Norvell's post office operated from 1935 to 1945.

The population was 250 in 1940. Norvell was around that time called a "mining camp" and was the site of a boarding house.

A November 1941 miners' strike which prevented between 10,000 and 11,000 West Virginia coal miners from working did not prevent the miners at the Fire Creek Mine in Norvell from working. During this time, the mines in Norvell and Fire Creek remained operational. A portion of the Chesapeake and Ohio Railway in Norvell, serving the Wright Coal and Coke Company Mine #2, was retired in 1942.

By the 1960s, Norvell was named one of the "worked out" mining towns of the New River gorge area of West Virginia. Others included Elmo, Quinnimont, Terry, Glade, and Fire Creek.

Norvell is one of the nearly 300 communities and ghost towns in Raleigh County.

== See also ==
- Pickshin, West Virginia
