= Buddy Jones (bluegrass musician) =

American bluegrass musician (1937–2014)

- Born: Shelby Gene Jones; February 2, 1937; Montcoal, West Virginia, USA
- Origin: Beckley, West Virginia, USA
- Died: August 13, 2014 (age 77) Barton, Vermont, USA
- Genres: Bluegrass, Folk, Classic rock
- Occupations: Singer-songwriter, song recorder, music distributor
- Instruments: vocals, guitar
- Years active: 1949–1953, 1958-2000s
- Labels: Diplomat, Jessup Records, Vermont Records
- Formerly of: The Rainbow Valley Boys & Sweetheart, Ralph Jones, Chico & Buddy, Toby Stroud & Jane, Jim Reeves, Scruggs & Flatt
- Military career
- Allegiance: United States
- Branch: United States Navy
- Service years: 1953–1957
- Unit: Task Force 77
- Conflicts: Korean War

Shelby Gene "Buddy" Jones (February 2, 1937 – August 13, 2014) was an American bluegrass musician, songwriter, and music recorder and distributor. He is best known for his performance work with the bluegrass band, Rainbow Valley Boys. He was also the founder of former recording, radio promotion, and record distribution companies B.J. Promotions, Tapes Unlimited, and Northern Music Distribution.

== Early life ==
Shelby Gene Jones was born on February 2, 1937, in West Virginia in Montcoal to Bert and Ethel Jones (née Queener) (born 1902 and 1903 respectively). He was the youngest of 6 children in the household. He had five siblings, brothers Ralph, Herbert, and Kenneth; and two sisters Dolly and Juanita. All of his siblings had been born in Newark, Ohio, but his family had moved to Beckley shortly before he was born. Jones attended Woodrow Wilson High School in fall 1949, and attended for three years, with only his sisters as his brothers were already almost adults when he began secondary education. At the age of 11, Jones' mother, taught him how to play some instruments, mainly the guitar.

== Military service ==
In 1953, Jones left the Beckly area and traveled to Knoxville, Tennessee, where he enlisted in the U.S. Navy during the end of the Korean War. He served on the USS Wren (DD-568) from 1954 to 1957, when he was discharged. During Buddy's time on the USS Wren, he contracted a severe case of Scarlet fever that went untreated for a time, eventually causing long-term effects including excessive hair loss.

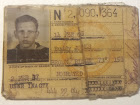
Jones' official military service authorization card, showing "Date of Birth of Bearer: 02 Feb '37".

== Music career ==
=== Early career (1949–1960) ===
After the war, Jones continued what he had started in 1949, and began pursuing a music career again. He recorded, sang, played guitar, and eventually produced for and promoted clients. He and his brother Ralph both became songwriters and had hits that were on the charts during the same time. While he and his brother did not always actually record their songs, their music has also been recorded and reproduced by various artists such as Kitty Wells, Marty Robbins, Janie Fricke, Hank Lockin, and Patsy Cline. Jones also played with various artists such as; Eric Weissberg & Steve Mandell, Earl Scruggs & Lester Flatt, Chet Atkins, Jim Reeves, and George Jones.

In 1958 he joined the bands Toby Stroud & Jane and The Blue Mountain Boys and also did performances with affiliated musicians Wilma Lee and Stony Cooper. He made a deal with bluegrass music distributor and entrepreneur Caz Walker in Fitchburg, and from 1959 into the 1980s he frequently traveled from his home in Fitchburg to places across New England, New York, and the Mid-Atlantic regions, down to Tennessee and the Carolinas.

=== Success (1961–1983) ===
==== Rainbow Valley Boys and Sweetheart ====
Art for the Rainbow Valley Boys' 1965 album "Authentic Bluegrass Music"

Art for the Rainbow Valley Boys' 1973 album "Sing and Pick Bluegrass Favorites"

In 1961, Jones and his close friends Louis Arsenault, Bob French, and his wife formed the band The Rainbow Valley Boys & Sweetheart. Most of Jones' (and the other band members) musician success came during their time in the band. Beginning in 1963 Buddy and other band members began to perform on radio shows, and local television programs quite frequently throughout the Northeast, including appearances on "The Coffee Drinking Night Hawk" with Lee More, a program based out of New Jersey, WWVA Jamboree, and WSTJ White River, where they would later sign with Vermont Records in Quechee. Their first album, entitled "Rainbow Valley Boys Bluegrass" was released in 1963 by Vermont Records. Their second album, "Authentic Bluegrass Music" was released in 1965 by record label Diplomat, and the band's third and final full album, "Sing and Pick Bluegrass Favorites" was released in 1973 by record label Jessup Records. In 1977 Jones signed with Tanya Tucker and toured several venues in places such as Nashville, Knoxville, and Elizabethtown. In 1979, Bob French and his wife left the band, leaving only Jones, Arsenault, and an ever-changing female band member to play the role of "Sweetheart". The band continued with less success until Buddy Jones left in 1982 and the band officially disbanded in early 1984.

=== Later career (1984–2000s) ===
In the mid-1980s, after his music career, Buddy proceeded to sell, promote, and distribute other artists' music through B.J. Promotions and Northern Music Distribution, respectively. Later into the 1990s, he would sell records, CDs, cassettes, and tapes through his business Tapes Unlimited.

== Personal life ==
When Buddy returned from his military service in 1958, he moved to Fitchburg, Massachusetts.

In 1962 he married his first wife, Bernice Young and in 1969 they moved to Hartland, Vermont. He continued recording music there for several years. In 1975 they divorced. They had one child, Denise.

In 1976 he started seeing his second wife, Marilyn Morale (née Lafleur) of Hartland. In 1978 they moved to West Burke, Vermont, where they married. Buddy continued his music career along with some activities later with family and friends until he retired. Together they raised 6 children: Steven (1957–2016), Linda (b. 1960), Ralph (b. 1962), Colleen Morale (b. 1964), Denise Agee (b. 1966), and Allan Cowdrey (b. 1971). In 1997 Marilyn and Buddy divorced; the two separated but remained friends, they lived as neighbors in the same town, and in 2003 they began living with each other again. The two still resided in West Burke until he began to develop moderate dementia, his physical health began to worsen in 2012, and he lived in a nursing home in Barton, Vermont, for over a year before his death in August 2014.
