= Big stick (disambiguation) =

Big stick may refer to:

- Big stick ideology, referring to Theodore Roosevelt's often-quoted aphorism
  - Big Stick, West Virginia, a community named for the above
  - The nickname of the battleship USS Iowa (BB-61)
  - The nickname of the aircraft carrier USS Theodore Roosevelt (CVN-71)
- Rural Municipality of Big Stick No. 141, Saskatchewan
- Big Stick (band), an alternative music act who scored a minor hit in 1986 with "Drag Racing"
- "Big Stick", a song by MUNA from Dancing on the Wall, 2026
