= Hot Coal, West Virginia =

Hot Coal
- Unincorporated community
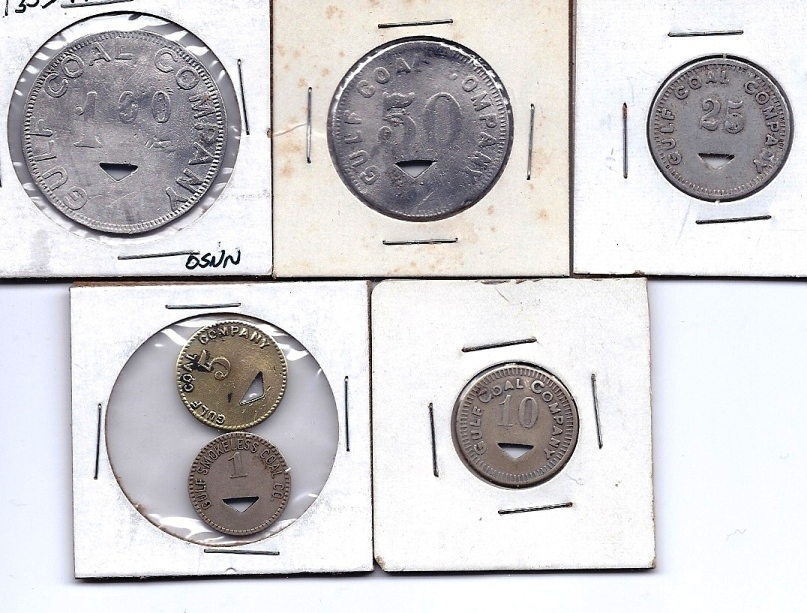
- Coal Scrip, from and used in Hot Coal, West Virginia

- Location within the state of West Virginia Hot Coal (the United States)
- Coordinates: 37°41′46″N 81°14′52″W
- Country: United States
- State: West Virginia
- County: Raleigh
- Elevation: 1,988 ft (606 m)
- Time zone: UTC-5 (Eastern (EST))
  - Summer (DST): UTC-4 (EDT)
- GNIS feature ID: 1554748

Hot Coal or Hotcoal was an unincorporated community and coal town located along the Winding Gulf Creek in Raleigh County, West Virginia, United States. Originally, it was named Patterson and later acquired the name Hot Coal. It was the next community past Big Stick on County Route 3/2. Although, the community now no longer exists, the Winding Gulf Bank, now the National Bank at Beckley, resided at Hot Coal and was moved to Beckley on January 1, 1914. Hot Coal at one time had a Post Office

Hot Coal was part of the Winding Gulf Coalfield. The community's name origin specifically related to the temperature of the coal when burned, in short, an advertisement of the coal quality. Fireco another unincorporated community located along the Winding Gulf Creek in Raleigh County, West Virginia, United States also has a similar name origin. During the years of 1925-44 it was documented to have mined 1,546,003 tons of coal
