= New Salem Baptist Church =

Baptist church in Tams, West Virginia, USA

- U.S. National Register of Historic Places
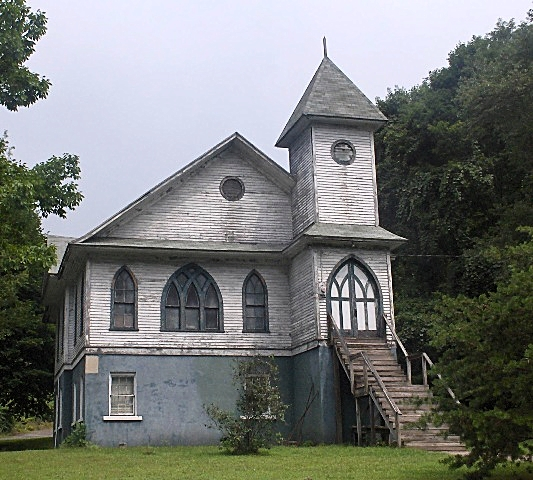
- New Salem Baptist Church in 2007.

- Location within West Virginia Location within the United States
- Location: 2197 McAlpin Tams, West Virginia 25915
- Coordinates: 37°40′28″N 81°18′02″W
- Built: 1921
- Architectural style: Gothic Revival architecture
- NRHP reference No.: 100008836
- Added to NRHP: 2023

The New Salem Baptist Church is a historic African-American church located in the former coal camp of Tams, Raleigh County, West Virginia. Constructed in 1921, the church is a rare surviving example of a vernacular Gothic Revival architecture building associated with African-American coal miners and their families during the early 20th century. The church was commissioned by Black members of the Tams community and built by coal baron William P. Tams, who also founded the town as part of his Gulf Smokeless Coal Company operations in the Winding Gulf coalfield. It originally served both Baptist and Methodist congregations until a separate Methodist church was established.

Architecturally, the church is a one-story, gable-front wood-frame structure with a raised stucco-finished basement and a prominent pyramidal-roofed bell tower. Characteristic features include lancet-arched stained glass windows and doors, a circular oculus in the gable, and modest decorative detailing typical of rural Gothic Revival churches. The interior features original wooden pews with carved lancet motifs, a raised pulpit, and an open floor plan designed for community gatherings. A fellowship hall and kitchen occupy the basement level.

The church played a central role in the social and spiritual life of Tams’ African-American residents, offering religious services, Sunday school, picnics, and community events. During a period when racial segregation defined much of public life, New Salem Baptist Church served as a vital institution that fostered community cohesion, cultural expression, and leadership among Black residents. At its peak, the congregation had over 300 members. Today, New Salem Baptist Church is the last extant structure from the once-thriving town of Tams.

It was listed on the National Register of Historic Places in 2023.

In 2024, the National Trust for Historic Preservation listed the church as one of the year's most endangered historic places. The following year, the church received a grant to go towards restoration and repairs.

== See also ==
- National Register of Historic Places listings in Raleigh County, West Virginia
