= Ury, West Virginia =

- Unincorporated community
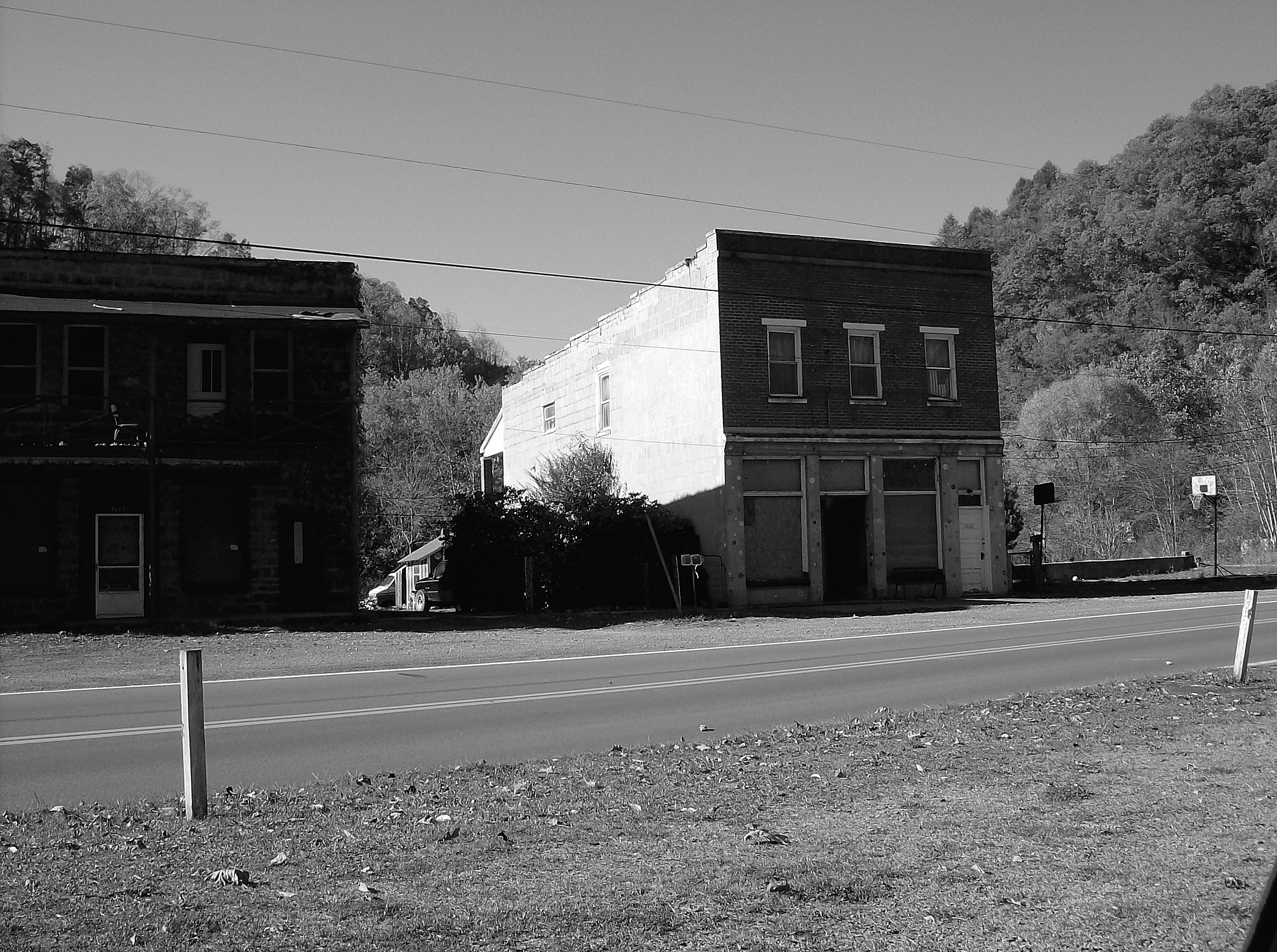
- Ury West Virginia along Route 16

- Location within West Virginia Location within the United States
- Coordinates: 37°39′13″N 81°18′54″W
- Country: United States
- State: West Virginia
- County: Raleigh
- Elevation: 1,683 ft (513 m)
- Time zone: UTC-5 (Eastern (EST))
  - Summer (DST): UTC-4 (EDT)
- ZIP codes: 25937
- Area codes: 304 & 681
- GNIS feature ID: 1555864

Ury is an unincorporated community in Raleigh County, West Virginia, United States. Ury is located on West Virginia Route 16 and Winding Gulf, 3 miles (4.8 km) north of Rhodell.
