= Josephine, West Virginia =

- Unincorporated community
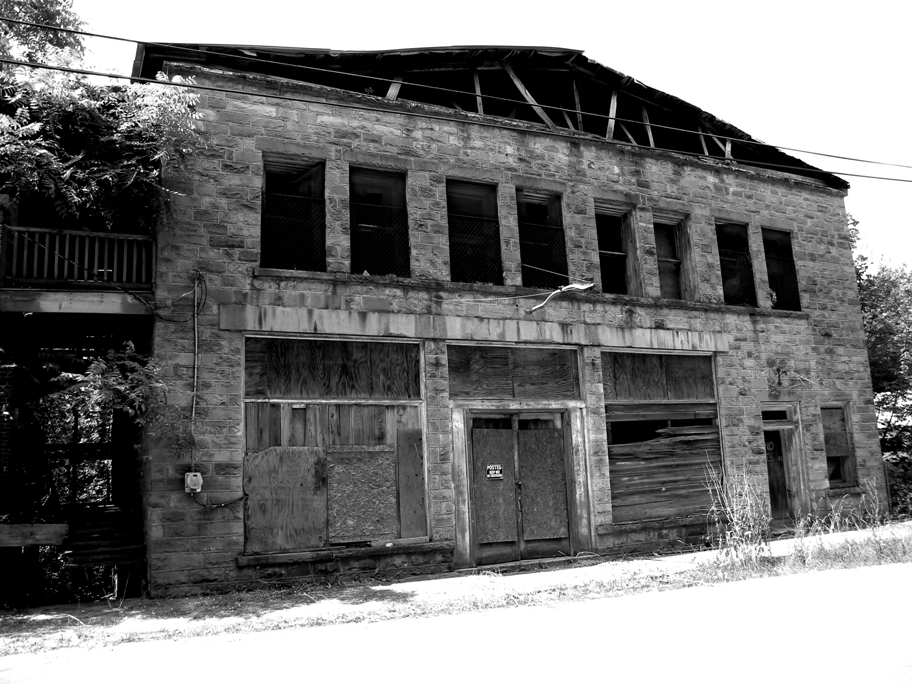
- Company store at Josephine West Virginia

- Location within West Virginia Location within the United States
- Coordinates: 37°37′12″N 81°13′25″W
- Country: United States
- State: West Virginia
- County: Raleigh
- Elevation: 2,070 ft (630 m)
- Time zone: UTC-5 (Eastern (EST))
  - Summer (DST): UTC-4 (EDT)
- ZIP code: 25857
- Area codes: 304 & 681
- GNIS feature ID: 1554834

Josephine is an unincorporated community in Raleigh County, West Virginia, United States. Josephine is 4.5 miles (7.2 km) east-northeast of Rhodell. Josephine has a post office with ZIP code 25857.
