= Winding Gulf =

- Location of the mouth of Winding Gulf in West Virginia

Location
- Country: United States
- State: West Virginia
- County: Raleigh

Physical characteristics
- Source
  - location: eastern Wyoming County
  - coordinates: 37.649837°N 81.257879°W
  - elevation: 2,536 ft (773 m)
- Mouth: Guyandotte River
  - location: Amigo
  - coordinates: 37.5976146°N 81.3214908°W
  - elevation: 1,558 ft (475 m)
- Length: 15.5 mi (24.9 km)
- Basin size: 21.63 sq mi (56.0 km^{2})

Winding Gulf is a 15.5-mile (24.9 km) long tributary of the Guyandotte River in Raleigh County, West Virginia. Winding Gulf is part of the Mississippi River watershed via the Guyandotte and Ohio Rivers, and drains an area of 21.63 square miles (56.0 km^{2}) in a rural area on the Allegheny Plateau.

Winding Gulf's entire course and drainage area are in southern Raleigh County. It rises about 2.3 miles (3.7 km) west-southwest of Princewick and initially flows to the north, passing through the community of Winding Gulf. It then turns west to follow the Norfolk and Western Railroad and flows through the communities of Big Stick and McAlpin. At McAlpin, it turns to the south to run along County Route 30 and West Virginia Route 16; this portion of the creek flows through the communities of Stotesbury, Tams, Ury, and Helen. Stonecoal Creek flows into Winding Gulf from the east in Stonecoal Junction, and shortly past their confluence, Winding Gulf flows into the Guyandotte River from the north in Amigo.

According to 1992 U.S. Geological Survey data, 92.54% of the Winding Gulf watershed was forested; 3.99% was used for agriculture, 1.67% for mining, and 1.82% for other uses.

== See also ==
- List of rivers of West Virginia
