= Coal City, West Virginia =

- Census-designated place (CDP)
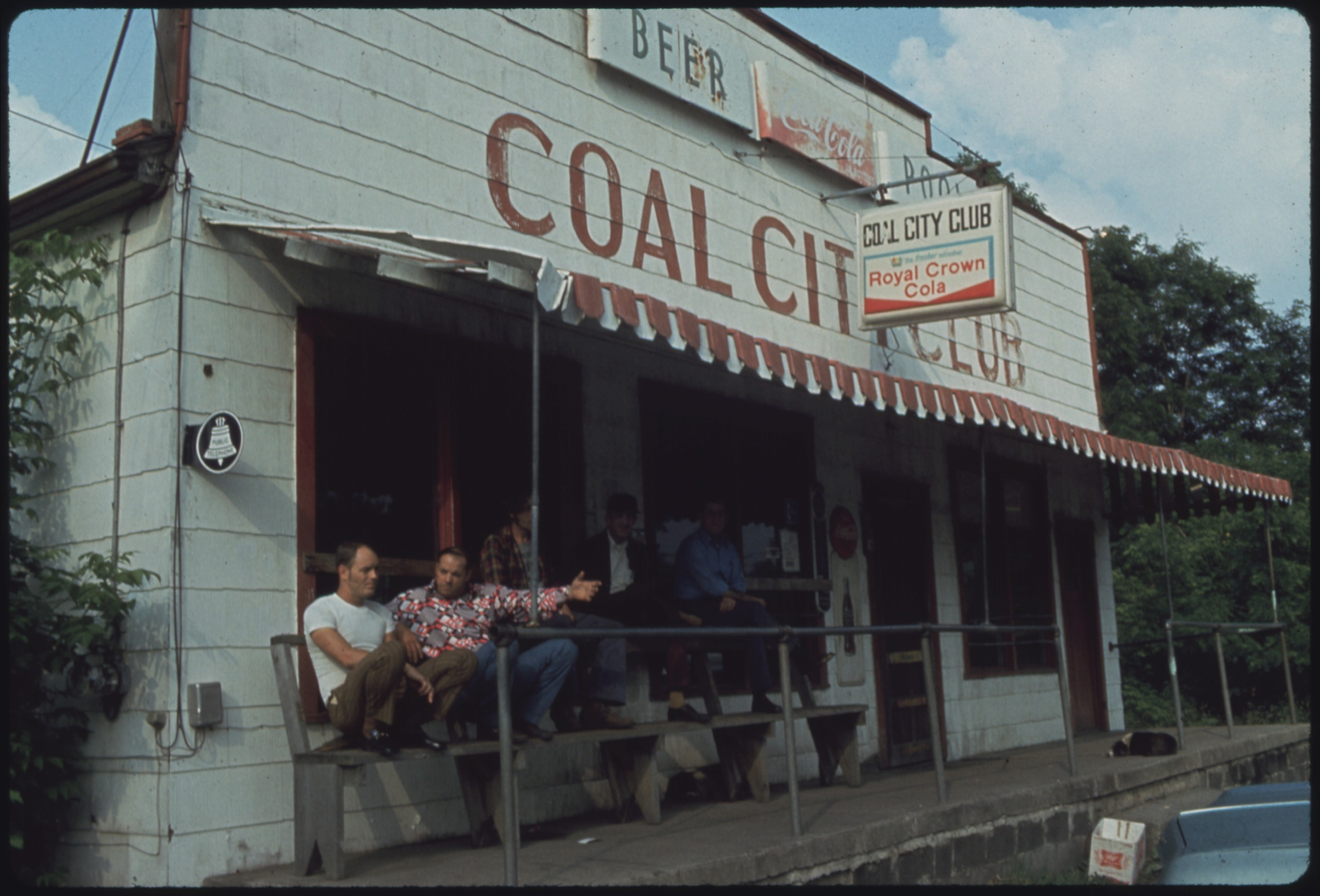
- Coal City Club, 1974

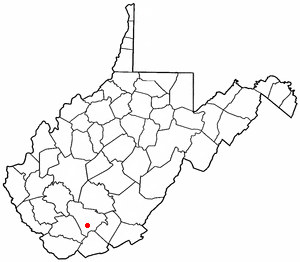
- Location of Coal City, West Virginia
- Coordinates: 37°40′39″N 81°13′05″W
- Country: United States
- State: West Virginia
- County: Raleigh

Area
  - Total: 6.3 sq mi (16.2 km^{2})
  - Land: 6.3 sq mi (16.2 km^{2})
  - Water: 0 sq mi (0.0 km^{2})
- Elevation: 2,543 ft (775 m)

Population (2020)
  - Total: 1,689
  - Density: 270/sq mi (104/km^{2})
- Time zone: UTC-5 (Eastern (EST))
  - Summer (DST): UTC-4 (EDT)
- ZIP code: 25823
- Area code(s): 304, 681
- FIPS code: 54-16516
- GNIS feature ID: 2389337

Coal City is a census-designated place (CDP) in Raleigh County, West Virginia, United States. The population was 1,689 at the 2020 census. Coal City's population is composed of other surrounding unincorporated communities (Whitby, Jonben, and Fireco).

== History ==
The community was named after the local coal mining industry.

== Geography ==
According to the United States Census Bureau, the CDP known as Coal City has a total area of 6.3 square miles (16.2 km^{2}), all land.

== Demographics ==
Historical population
Census	Pop.	Note	%±
2000	1,905		—
2010	1,815		−4.7%
2020	1,689		−6.9%
U.S. Decennial Census

As of the census of 2000, there were 1,905 people, 794 households, and 578 families residing in Coal City. The population density was 303.8 people per square mile (117.3/km^{2}). There were 845 housing units at an average density of 134.7/sq mi (52.0/km^{2}). The racial makeup of the CDP was 98.22% White, 0.37% African American, 0.05% Asian, 0.21% from other races, and 1.15% from two or more races. Hispanic or Latino of any race were 1.05% of the population.

There were 794 households, out of which 24.9% had children under the age of 18 living with them, 60.2% were married couples living together, 9.8% had a female householder with no husband present, and 27.1% were non-families. 24.4% of all households were made up of individuals, and 12.5% had someone living alone who was 65 years of age or older. The average household size was 2.40 and the average family size was 2.84.

In the CDP, the population was spread out, with 19.9% under the age of 18, 8.8% from 18 to 24, 26.0% from 25 to 44, 27.2% from 45 to 64, and 18.0% who were 65 years of age or older. The median age was 42 years. For every 100 females, there were 97.4 males. For every 100 females age 18 and over, there were 92.7 males.

The median income for a household in the CDP was $28,049, and the median income for a family was $33,897. Males had a median income of $29,338 versus $16,548 for females. The per capita income for the CDP was $14,552. About 8.6% of families and 12.4% of the population were below the poverty line, including 18.5% of those under age 18 and 11.8% of those age 65 or over.
