= Dorothy, West Virginia =

Unincorporated community in West Virginia, United States

- Unincorporated community and Census-designated place
- Location within West Virginia Location within the United States
- Coordinates: 37°57′21″N 81°27′02″W
- Country: United States
- State: West Virginia
- County: Raleigh
- Elevation: 1,004 ft (306 m)
- Time zone: UTC-5 (Eastern (EST))
  - Summer (DST): UTC-4 (EDT)
- ZIP code: 25060
- Area codes: 304 & 681
- GNIS feature ID: 2807506

Dorothy is an unincorporated community in Raleigh County, West Virginia, United States. As of the 2020 census, Dorothy had a population of 207. Dorothy is 4.5 miles (7.2 km) east-southeast of Whitesville. Dorothy has a post office with ZIP code 25060. At one time, it was also called Lawson.
