= Price Hill, Fayette County, West Virginia =

Price Hill, West Virginia
- Unincorporated community
- Location within West Virginia Location within the United States
- Coordinates: 37°52′56″N 81°11′22″W
- Country: United States
- State: West Virginia
- Counties: Fayette and Raleigh
- Elevation: 2,064 ft (629 m)
- Time zone: UTC-5 (Eastern (EST))
  - Summer (DST): UTC-4 (EDT)
- Area codes: 304 & 681
- GNIS feature ID: 1555408

Price Hill is an unincorporated community and coal town in Fayette and Raleigh counties, West Virginia, United States. Located on the outskirts of Mount Hope along the banks of Dunloup Creek, it was built in the 1890s by the McKell Coal & Coke Company as a company town. Until the 1980s, the large Siltex Mine operated nearby.
