= Oswald, West Virginia =

Oswald
- Unincorporated community
- Location within the state of West Virginia Oswald (the United States)
- Coordinates: 37°51′37″N 81°10′20″W
- Country: United States
- State: West Virginia
- County: Raleigh
- Elevation: 1,913 ft (583 m)
- Time zone: UTC-5 (Eastern (EST))
  - Summer (DST): UTC-4 (EDT)
- GNIS ID: 1742885

Oswald is an unincorporated community in Raleigh County, West Virginia, United States.
