= Battleship, West Virginia =

Unincorporated community in West Virginia, United States

Battleship
- unincorporated community
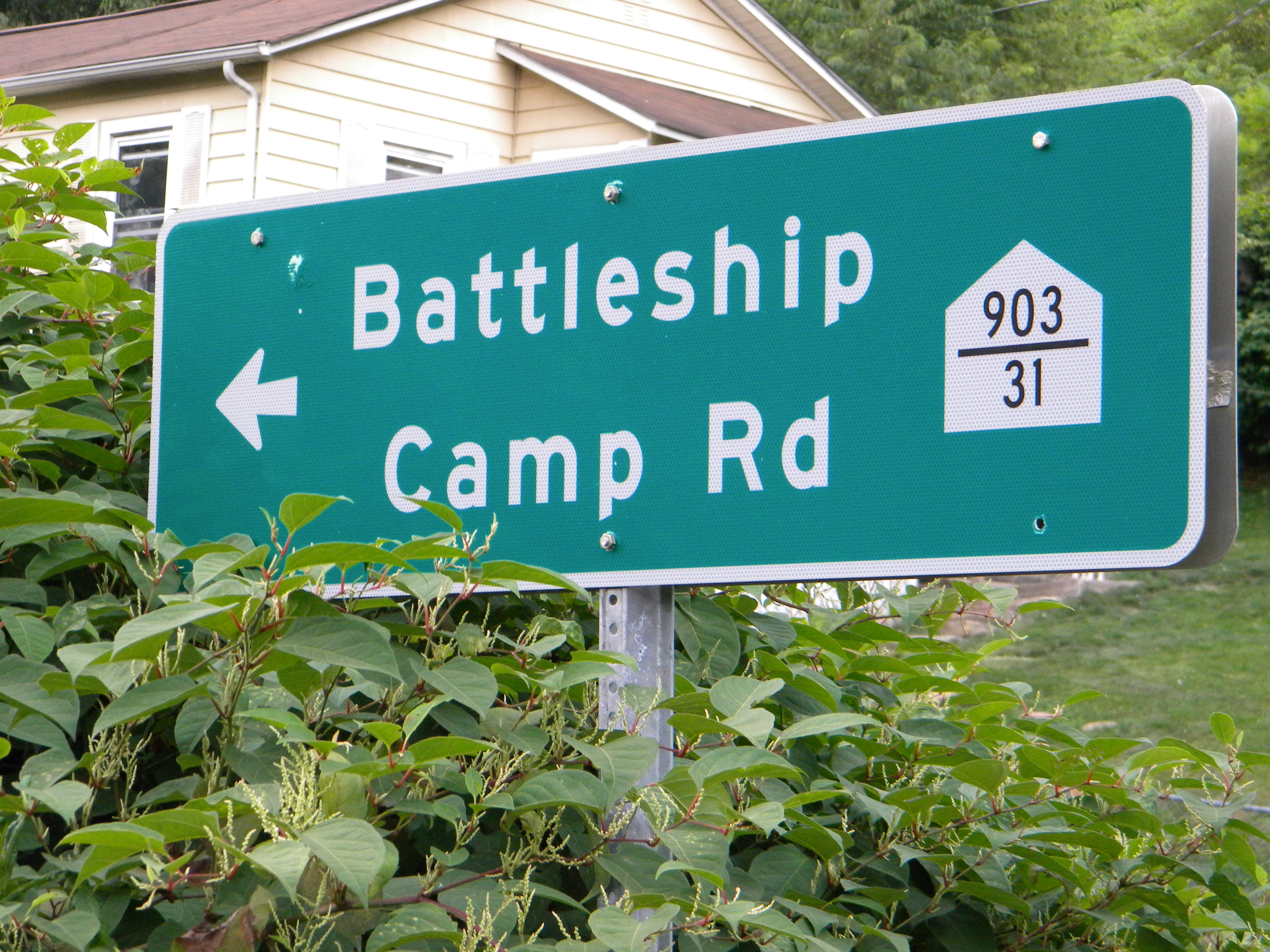
- Community sign, Battleship, West Virginia

- Location within the state of West Virginia Battleship (the United States)
- Coordinates: 37°39′45″N 81°11′32″W
- Country: United States
- State: West Virginia
- County: Raleigh
- Elevation: 2,303 ft (702 m)
- Time zone: UTC-5 (Eastern (EST))
  - Summer (DST): UTC-4 (EDT)
- GNIS feature ID: 2747476

Battleship is an unincorporated community located in Raleigh County, West Virginia, United States. Battleship has been known by two other names: Ralco and West Whitby. The community was part of the Winding Gulf Coalfield.
