= Stonewall, West Virginia =

Stonewall
- Unincorporated community
- Location within the state of West Virginia
- Coordinates: 37°49′32″N 81°7′43″W
- Country: United States
- State: West Virginia
- County: Raleigh
- Elevation: 1,453 ft (443 m)
- Time zone: UTC-5 (Eastern (EST))
  - Summer (DST): UTC-4 (EDT)
- GNIS ID: 1742979

Stonewall was an unincorporated community in Raleigh County, West Virginia, United States.
