= Whitby, West Virginia =

Whitby
- Unincorporated community
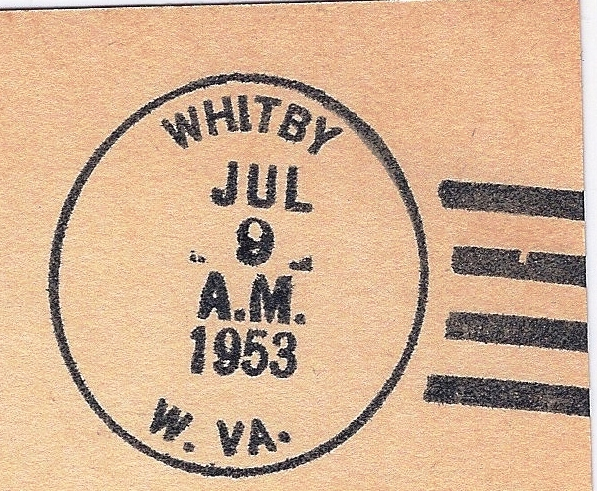
- Postmark from Whitby, West Virginia

- Location within the state of West Virginia Whitby (the United States)
- Coordinates: 37°39′58″N 81°11′3″W
- Country: United States
- State: West Virginia
- County: Raleigh
- Elevation: 2,310 ft (700 m)
- Time zone: UTC-5 (Eastern (EST))
  - Summer (DST): UTC-4 (EDT)
- ZIP codes: 25939
- GNIS feature ID: 1555966

Whitby is an unincorporated community and coal town in the Winding Gulf Coalfield of southern West Virginia within Raleigh County, United States.

== History ==
Originally, Whitby was named Stahl. Before 1919, Bowyer was another accepted town name. By 1919, the town name of Whitby was being used. As of 1927, Whitby was the official name used by the United States Post Office. The post office closed in June 1988. From 1917 to 1982 Whitby is documented to have mined 8,995,174 tons of coal by the Bowyer Smokeless Coal Company, Sterling Smokeless Coal Company, Smith and Stover Coal Company and the R&F Coal Company.

== Demographics ==
Whitby is part of the census-designated place of Coal City. At its height of coal production in the 1940s, Whitby had a population of 400.

== Notable person ==
Alexander Halstead was the first settler at Whitby and resided there during the creation of Raleigh County in 1850.

== Gallery ==
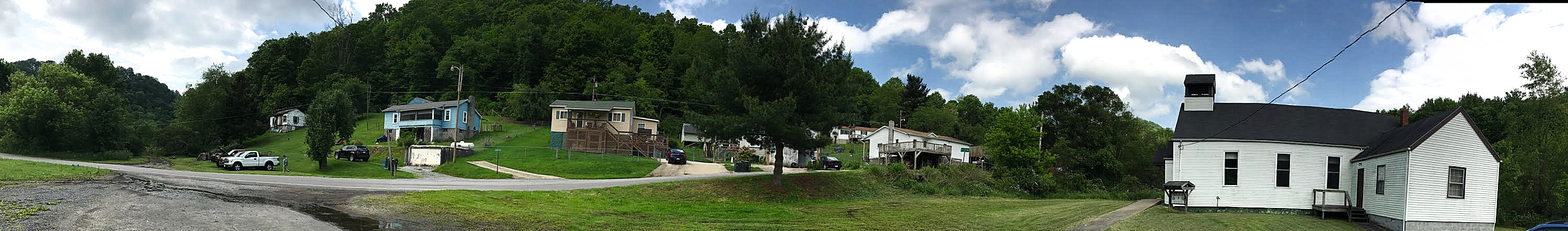
Panorama of Whitby West Virginia
