= Stickney, West Virginia =

- Unincorporated community
- Location within West Virginia Location within the United States
- Coordinates: 37°54′05″N 81°31′39″W
- Country: United States
- State: West Virginia
- County: Raleigh
- Elevation: 955 ft (291 m)
- Time zone: UTC-5 (Eastern (EST))
  - Summer (DST): UTC-4 (EDT)
- Area codes: 304 & 681
- GNIS feature ID: 1555712

Stickney is an unincorporated community in Raleigh County, West Virginia, United States. Stickney is located on West Virginia Route 3, 5 miles (8.0 km) south of Whitesville.
