= Royal, West Virginia =

Royal
- Unincorporated community
- Location within the state of West Virginia Royal (the United States)
- Coordinates: 37°51′10″N 81°4′4″W
- Country: United States
- State: West Virginia
- County: Raleigh
- Elevation: 1,243 ft (379 m)
- Time zone: UTC-5 (Eastern (EST))
  - Summer (DST): UTC-4 (EDT)
- GNIS ID: 1555536

Royal was an unincorporated community in Raleigh County, West Virginia, United States.

Royal was founded in 1890, directly across from Prince.

== See also ==
- List of ghost towns in West Virginia
