= Affinity, West Virginia =

Unincorporated community in West Virginia, United States

- Unincorporated community
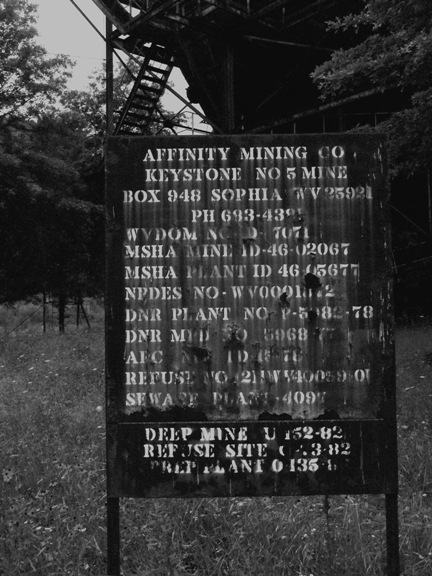
- Affinity West Virginia Mine sign

- Location within West Virginia Location within the United States
- Coordinates: 37°42′46″N 81°13′33″W
- Country: United States
- State: West Virginia
- County: Raleigh
- Elevation: 2,336 ft (712 m)
- Time zone: UTC-5 (Eastern (EST))
  - Summer (DST): UTC-4 (EDT)
- Area codes: 304 & 681
- GNIS feature ID: 1553701

Affinity is an unincorporated community in Raleigh County, West Virginia, United States. Affinity is 1.5 miles (2.4 km) east-northeast of Sophia. Affinity is located along Affinity Complex Road and a former line of the Norfolk and Western Railroad in the Soak Creek valley. Affinity developed as a coal town in the early 20th century. By the late 1910s, the Pemberton Coal & Coke Company operated the Affinity mine in the community. Affinity is one of the historic coal communities of the Winding Gulf Coalfield, which extends through western Raleigh County and eastern Wyoming County, West Virginia

The modern Affinity Mine is an underground coal mine near the community. The mine operates in the Pocahontas coalfield and is accessed and ventilated through three vertical shafts and a slope. The mine was idled in 1985 and remained inactive for approximately 25 years. United Coal Company acquired the complex in 2010 and began redeveloping the operation, with mining resuming in 2011. In February 2013, two miners were killed in separate accidents at the mine, prompting additional scrutiny of its safety record. There was later a pretty complicated fight involving MSHA's Pattern of Violations enforcement process. Mine workers sued federal regulators over how Affinity's safety violations were handled, while United Coal disputed characterizations of the mine's safety record.

West Virginia's official 2021 mine report ranked the mine in Affinity among the ten largest underground coal mines in West Virginia, reporting 2,188,659 tons of production and 223 employees that year. The 2022 state report recorded roughly 1.8 million tons and 242 employees.
