= Cedar, Raleigh County, West Virginia =

Unincorporated community in West Virginia, United States

Cedar
- Unincorporated community
- Location within the state of West Virginia Cedar (the United States)
- Coordinates: 37°44′13″N 81°12′44″W
- Country: United States
- State: West Virginia
- County: Raleigh
- Elevation: 2,274 ft (693 m)
- Time zone: UTC-5 (Eastern (EST))
  - Summer (DST): UTC-4 (EDT)
- GNIS ID: 1554090

Cedar was an unincorporated community in Raleigh County, West Virginia. It was also known as Viacova, which had its own post office.
