= Sprague, West Virginia =

- Unincorporated community and census-designated place
- Location within West Virginia Location within the United States
- Coordinates: 37°47′38″N 81°10′56″W
- Country: United States
- State: West Virginia
- County: Raleigh
- Elevation: 2,392 ft (729 m)
- Time zone: UTC-5 (Eastern (EST))
  - Summer (DST): UTC-4 (EDT)
- ZIP code: 25926
- Area codes: 304 & 681
- GNIS feature ID: 2807508

Sprague is an unincorporated community and coal town in Raleigh County, West Virginia, United States. Sprague is located on West Virginia Route 16, 1 mile (1.6 km) north of downtown Beckley. Sprague has a post office with ZIP code 25926.

As of the 2020 census, Sprague had a population of 1,289.

The community was named in 1902.

== Climate ==
The climate in this area has mild differences between highs and lows, and there is adequate rainfall year-round. According to the Köppen Climate Classification system, Sprague has a marine west coast climate, abbreviated "Cfb" on climate maps.
