= Mead, West Virginia =

- Unincorporated community
- Location within West Virginia Location within the United States
- Coordinates: 37°37′28″N 81°15′38″W
- Country: United States
- State: West Virginia
- County: Raleigh
- Elevation: 1,768 ft (539 m)
- Time zone: UTC-5 (Eastern (EST))
  - Summer (DST): UTC-4 (EDT)
- ZIP codes: 25877
- Area codes: 304 & 681
- GNIS feature ID: 1543037

Mead is an unincorporated community in Raleigh County, West Virginia, United States. Mead is located on County Route 33 and Stonecoal Creek, 2.7 miles (4.3 km) east-northeast of Rhodell. Mead had a post office, which closed on June 10, 1989. It was also known as Vanwood.

The community was named after C. H. Mead, the proprietor of a local mine.

== Gallery ==
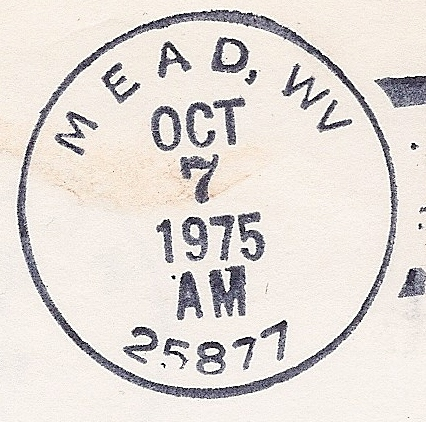
Mead postmark
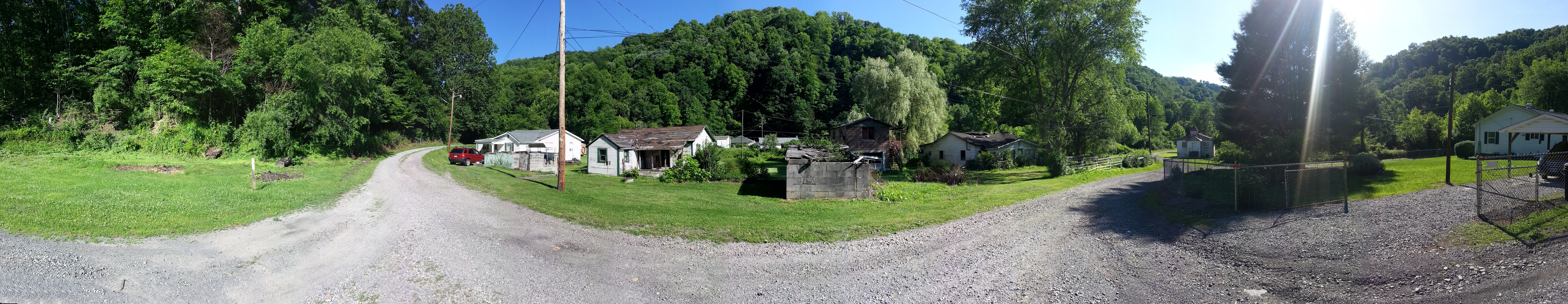
The community of Mead
