= USS Wren =

Fletcher-class destroyer

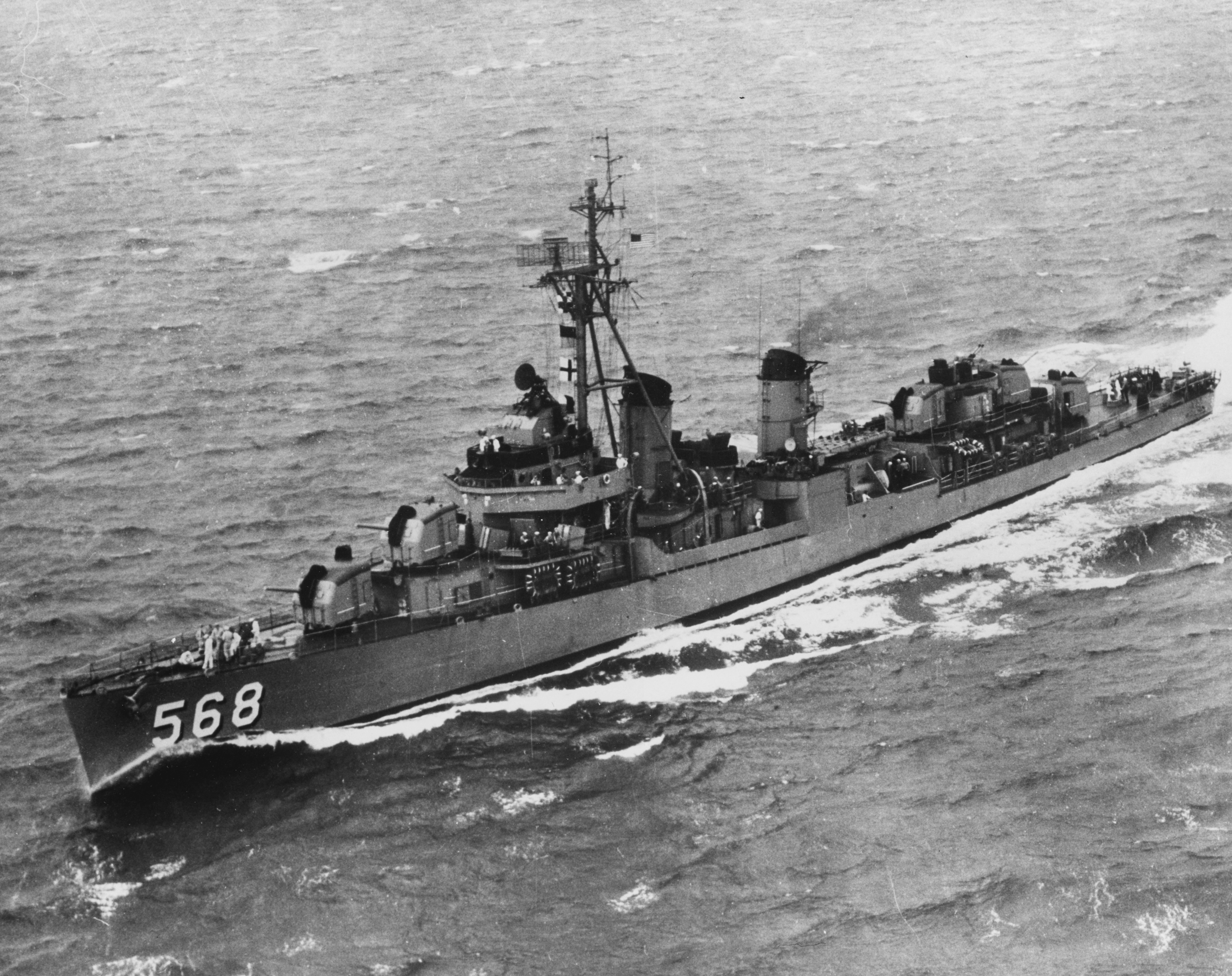
- USS Wren (DD-568) underway in the 1950s

History

United States
- Namesake: Solomon Wren
- Builder: Seattle-Tacoma Shipbuilding Corporation
- Laid down: 24 April 1943
- Launched: 29 January 1944
- Commissioned: 20 May 1944
- Decommissioned: December 1963
- Stricken: 1 December 1974
- Honours and awards: 3 Battle Stars
- Fate: Sold for scrap, 22 October 1975

General characteristics
- Class & type: Fletcher-class destroyer
- Displacement: 2,050 tons
- Length: 376 ft 6 in (114.7 m)
- Beam: 39 ft 8 in (12.1 m)
- Draft: 17 ft 9 in (5.4 m)
- Propulsion: 60,000 shp (45 MW); 2 propellers
- Speed: 35 knots (65 km/h; 40 mph)
- Range: 6500 nm (12,000 km) at 15 kn
- Complement: 273
- Armament: 5 × 5 in (130 mm), 4 × 40 mm AA guns, 4 × 20 mm AA guns, 10 × 21 in torpedo tubes, 6 × depth charge projectors, 2 × depth charge tracks

USS Wren (DD-568) was a Fletcher-class destroyer of the United States Navy.

== Namesake ==
Solomon Wren was born in 1780 in Loudoun County, Virginia. He enlisted in the United States Marine Corps at Alexandria, Virginia on 1 April 1799. Assigned to the schooner USS Enterprise, Wren rose in rank and, by the end of 1803, had been promoted to sergeant.

In February 1804, Wren volunteered for the expedition to destroy the frigate USS Philadelphia, captured by the Tripolitan pirates on 31 October 1803 after grounding on an uncharted reef off Tripoli. Under the command of Lieutenant Stephen Decatur, Jr., Wren and 68 other sailors and marines entered Tripoli harbor on the night of 16 February, in the ketch USS Intrepid and succeeded in setting fire to the former American ship during the First Barbary War. On 3 August 1804 Wren was slightly wounded while assigned to Gunboat No. 4 during another attack on Tripoli. On 20 September he transferred to the frigate USS John Adams and returned home. He was detached from the Marine Corps on 24 March 1805 and no further record of his life has been found.

== Construction and commissioning ==
Wren was laid down on 24 April 1943 at Seattle, Wash., by the Seattle-Tacoma Shipbuilding Corp.; launched on 29 January 1944, sponsored by Mrs. Jeanne F. Dockweiler; and commissioned on 20 May 1944.

Wren had three blade props instead of four, making her much faster than most Fletcher class destroyers: 39.9 knots instead of the 35 listed above which was the standard Fletcher speed.

== World War II ==
Following commissioning, Wren operated out of San Diego, Calif. conducting shakedown training. In August, she reported for duty with the Northern Pacific Force in the Aleutian Islands. Her duties there consisted largely of patrol and escort work between the islands of the Aleutian chain. She did, however, participate in four shore bombardment missions against the Japanese Kuril Islands with Task Force 92 (TF 92) between November 1944 and April 1945. Her first action occurred on 21 November 1944 when she participated in the shelling of Matsuwa. Her second and third bombardment missions took her to Paramushiro on 5 January and 18 February 1945, respectively. Her final bombardment of the Kurils took place on 15 March 1945, and Matsuwa again served as the target.

On 19 April, she stood out of Kulsk Bay, bound for Hawaii. The destroyer arrived at Pearl Harbor on the 25th but soon continued her voyage to the Western Carolines. She stopped at Ulithi Atoll until 17 May at which time she left the lagoon on her way to join in the six-week-old Okinawa campaign. The ship served in the Ryukyus from 21 May to 18 June, performing antisubmarine patrols and standing antiaircraft radar picket watch. She came under air attack on several occasions but sustained no major hits while ending the careers of at least four of her airborne attackers.

Departing Okinawa on 18 June, she arrived at Leyte in the Philippines three days later and remained there until 1 July when she joined units of TF 38 for the final series of carrier-based aerial attacks on Japan. Wren spent the remaining weeks of the war at sea with TF 38 supporting the carriers while their planes struck the Japanese homeland.

On 26 August, Wren entered Tokyo Bay with other elements of the 3d Fleet to begin the occupation of Japan and to prepare for the formal surrender ceremony at which she was present on 2 September. She departed Japan that same day and, during the next month, visited Iwo Jima and Eniwetok. The warship returned to Tokyo on 13 October for a visit of just over a month. She departed Japan on 18 November and arrived at Oahu on the 28th. Resuming her voyage east on 1 December, she entered San Diego on the 7th. After a two-day visit, she headed—by way of the Panama Canal—for the Philadelphia Naval Shipyard where she arrived on 23 December. After an inactivation overhaul at Philadelphia, Wren moved to Charleston, S.C., late in March 1946. On 13 July 1946, the destroyer was placed out of commission at Charleston.

Wren earned three battle stars during World War II.

== 1951 – 1963 ==
A little over five years later, on 7 September 1951, Wren was placed back in commission at Charleston. For the next two years, she operated along the eastern seaboard and in the West Indies. During the latter months of 1951, she conducted standardization and vibration tests under the auspices of the Bureau of Ships and its research facility at Carderock, Md., the David Taylor Model Basin. She returned to Charleston in December and, throughout 1952 and for the first eight months of 1953, performed normal operations and training in the western Atlantic.

In August 1953, Wren was reassigned to Destroyer Division 61 (DesDiv 61) for deployment to the Far East. She stood out of Norfolk, Va. on 28 August and transited the Panama Canal on 2 September. After stops at San Diego, Pearl Harbor, and Midway, she arrived in Yokosuka on 3 October. A week later, she put to sea to join Task Force 77 (TF 77) in the Sea of Japan. The fast carriers conducted air operations there and in the Yellow Sea, and Wren provided screen and plane-guard services to them between 10 October and 26 November. Following that assignment, she joined the Australian carrier HMAS Sydney and provided similar services until mid-December when she returned to Japan at Sasebo for the Christmas holidays.

The destroyer rejoined TF 77 on 3 January 1954 and cruised with the carriers until the 17th when she became a unit of TF 95. She served along the Korean coast carrying out cease-fire surveillance missions with TF 95 until 1 February, when she returned to Sasebo to prepare for the voyage home. She departed Japan on 11 February and, taking a westward route through the Indian and Atlantic Oceans, completed a circumnavigation of the globe when she arrived in Norfolk on 9 April.

For the remainder of her active career, Wren operated out of Norfolk periodically making overseas deployments. Among her 2nd Fleet activities were midshipman summer cruises, some to northern European ports and others to West Indian and American ports. She also served with the 6th Fleet in the Mediterranean Sea on several occasions. Annual "Springboard" exercises took her to Puerto Rico, Cuba, and Panama each spring. During her 1957 Mediterranean deployment, the ship served with the Mid East Force in the Indian Ocean and participated in Operation Crescent with units of the Pakistani Navy.

Wren appeared in the 1959 movie, Operation Petticoat while on a port call to Naval Station Key West, Florida.

Transferred to the Naval Reserve Force, the Wren was later used by a Naval Reserve unit in Houston, Texas and based in Galveston, Texas in the early 1960s. During this time, it supported Naval Reserve activities and made weekend ASW training trips in the Gulf of Mexico.

In December 1963, after almost a decade of duty with the Atlantic Fleet, Wren was placed out of commission, in reserve. She spent the next 11 years in the Reserve Fleet, berthed at the Naval Inactive Ship Facility at Naval Station Philadelphia. Her name was struck from the Navy list in December 1974 and on 22 October 1975, she was sold to the North American Smelting Co., Wilmington, Del., for scrapping.

== In movies and television ==
The ship is seen in the movie Operation Petticoat (1959). USS Wren also portrayed the destroyer that first communicates with George Ray Tweed in the 1962 film No Man is an Island. She also appeared on the Magnum, P.I. 1983 episode "Operation Silent Night" (archival film footage, since Wren had already been scrapped).
