= Ameagle, West Virginia =

Unincorporated community in West Virginia, United States

- Unincorporated community
- Location within West Virginia Location within the United States
- Coordinates: 37°56′59″N 81°25′07″W
- Country: United States
- State: West Virginia
- County: Raleigh
- Elevation: 1,083 ft (330 m)
- Time zone: UTC-5 (Eastern (EST))
  - Summer (DST): UTC-4 (EDT)
- ZIP codes: 25004
- Area codes: 304 & 681
- GNIS feature ID: 1534917

Ameagle is an unincorporated community in Raleigh County, West Virginia, United States. Ameagle is 6 miles (9.7 km) east-southeast of Whitesville. The community was named for the American Eagle Colliery.
