= Jonben, West Virginia =

Jonben
- Unincorporated community
- Location within the state of West Virginia Jonben (the United States)
- Coordinates: 37°39′22″N 81°11′31″W
- Country: United States
- State: West Virginia
- County: Raleigh
- Time zone: UTC-6 (Central (CST))
  - Summer (DST): UTC-5 (CDT)
- ZIP codes: 25856
- GNIS feature ID: 1554827

Jonben is an unincorporated community and coal town within the Winding Gulf Coalfield and is located within Raleigh County, West Virginia, United States.

== History ==
The town was founded by John Tolley and Benjamin Meadows. Their Post Office closed in July 2005.
