= Wickham, West Virginia =

Wickham
- Unincorporated community
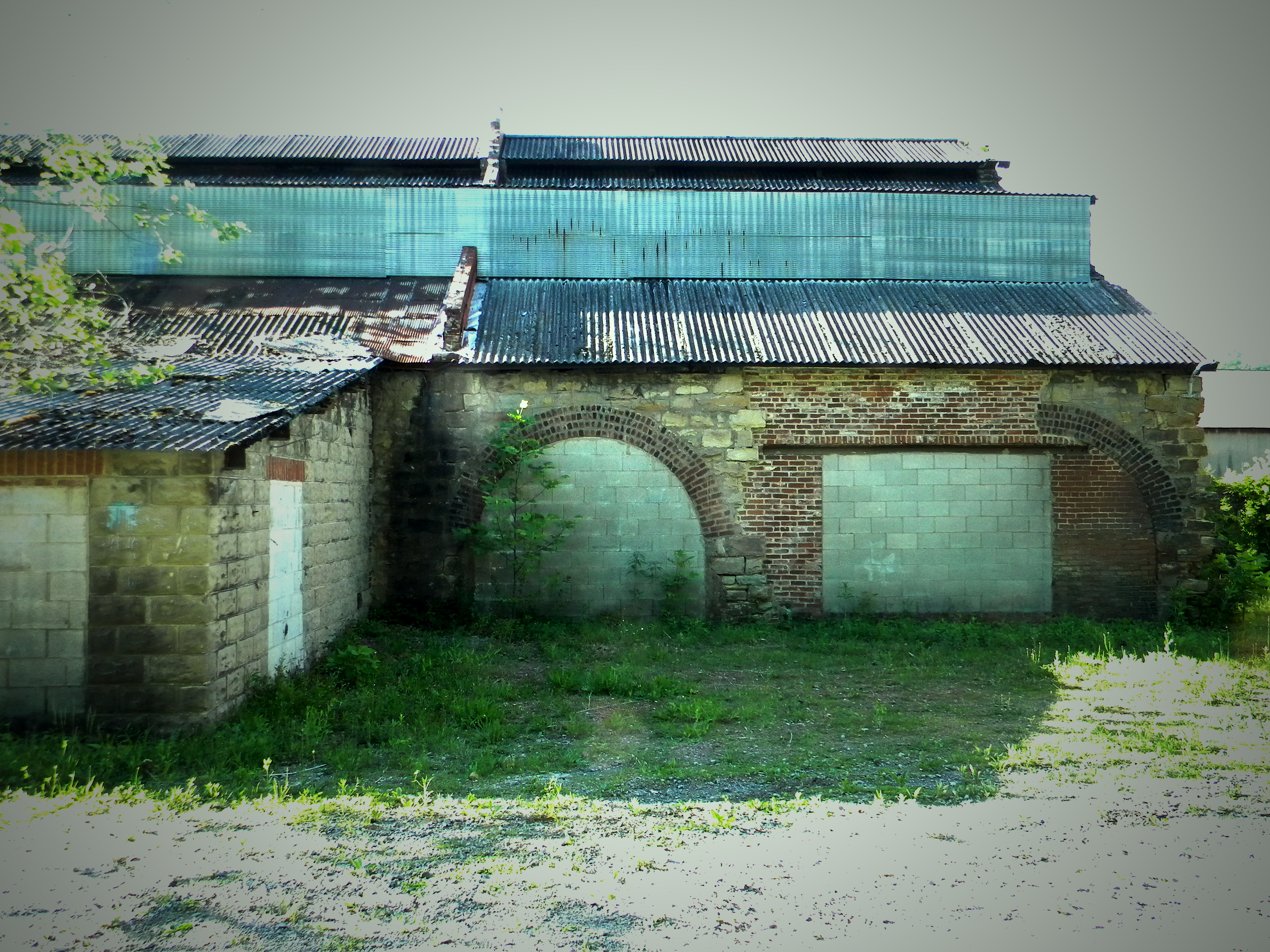
- Power station at Wickham, West Virginia

- Location within the state of West Virginia Wickham (the United States)
- Coordinates: 37°46′56″N 81°13′00″W
- Country: United States
- State: West Virginia
- County: Raleigh
- Elevation: 2,418 ft (737 m)
- Time zone: UTC-5 (Eastern (EST))
  - Summer (DST): UTC-4 (EDT)
- GNIS feature ID: 1555981

Wickham is an unincorporated community in Raleigh County, West Virginia, United States. Its post office is closed.

The community was named after Thomas Wickham, the proprietor of a local mine.
