= Cranberry, West Virginia =

Unincorporated community in West Virginia, United States

- Unincorporated community
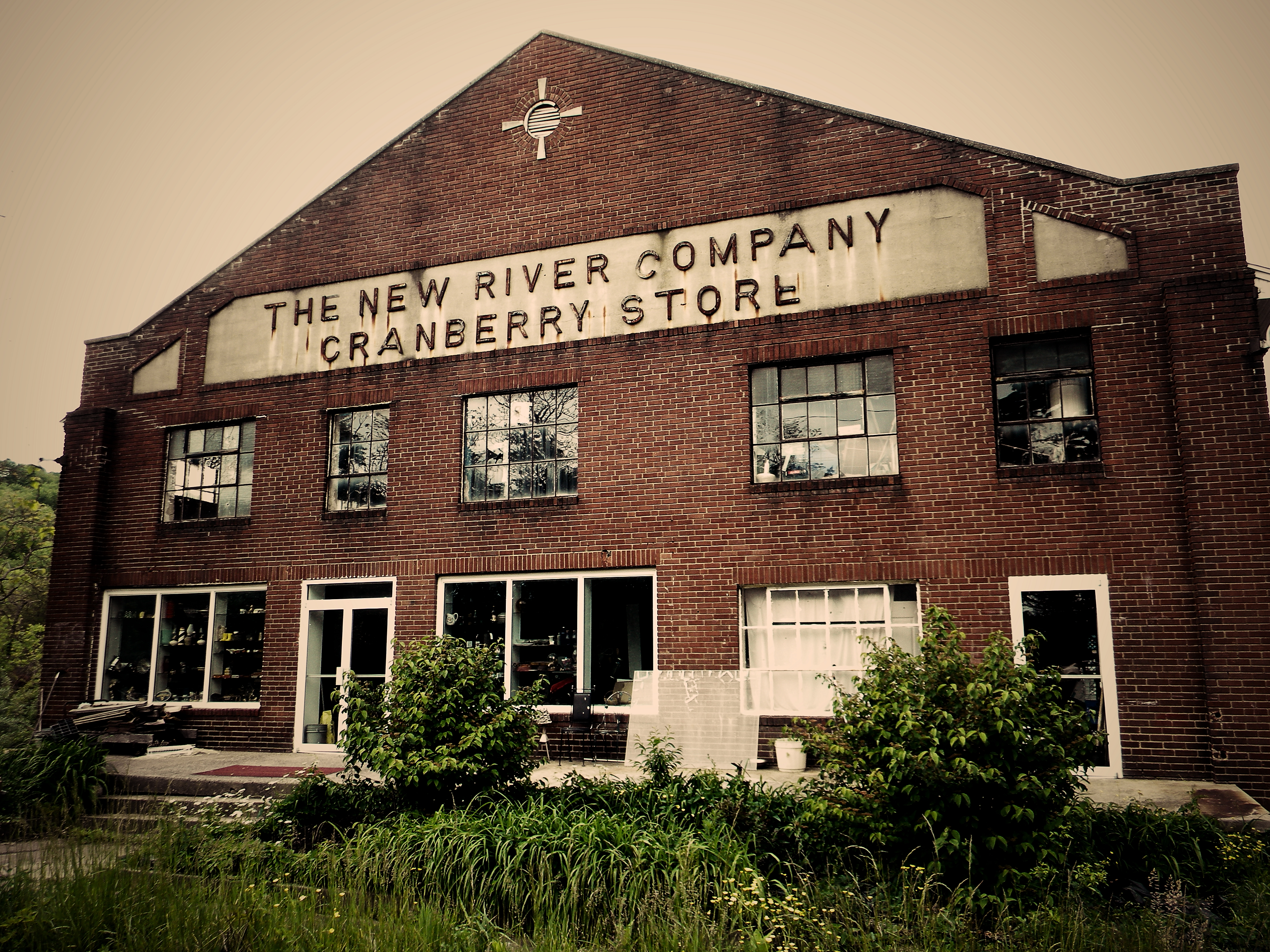
- New River Coal Company store in Cranberry West Virginia

- Location within West Virginia Location within the United States
- Coordinates: 37°49′18″N 81°11′42″W
- Country: United States
- State: West Virginia
- County: Raleigh
- Elevation: 2,352 ft (717 m)
- Time zone: UTC-5 (Eastern (EST))
  - Summer (DST): UTC-4 (EDT)
- Area codes: 304 & 681
- GNIS feature ID: 1554214

Cranberry is an unincorporated community in Raleigh County, West Virginia, United States. Cranberry is 3 miles (4.8 km) north of Beckley.

The community takes its name from nearby Cranberry Creek.
