= Birchton, West Virginia =

Unincorporated community in West Virginia, United States

Birchton
- Unincorporated community
- Location within the state of West Virginia Birchton (the United States)
- Coordinates: 37°55′58″N 81°32′29″W
- Country: United States
- State: West Virginia
- County: Raleigh
- Elevation: 889 ft (271 m)
- Time zone: UTC-5 (Eastern (EST))
  - Summer (DST): UTC-4 (EDT)
- GNIS feature ID: 1553907

Birchton is an unincorporated community located in Raleigh County, West Virginia, United States.
