= Tamroy, West Virginia =

Tamroy
- Unincorporated community
- Location within the state of West Virginia Tamroy (the United States)
- Coordinates: 37°51′7″N 81°10′0″W
- Country: United States
- State: West Virginia
- County: Raleigh
- Elevation: 2,001 ft (610 m)
- Time zone: UTC-5 (Eastern (EST))
  - Summer (DST): UTC-4 (EDT)
- GNIS ID: 1742992

Tamroy was a company-owned mining town in Raleigh County, West Virginia. It was owned by McKell Coal & Coke Company.
