= Eunice, West Virginia =

Unincorporated community in West Virginia, United States

Eunice
- Unincorporated community
- Location within the state of West Virginia Eunice (the United States)
- Coordinates: 37°56′47″N 81°32′36″W
- Country: United States
- State: West Virginia
- County: Raleigh
- Elevation: 866 ft (264 m)
- Time zone: UTC-5 (Eastern (EST))
  - Summer (DST): UTC-4 (EDT)
- GNIS ID: 1538748

Eunice is an unincorporated community in Raleigh County, West Virginia.
