= Willibet, West Virginia =

- Unincorporated community
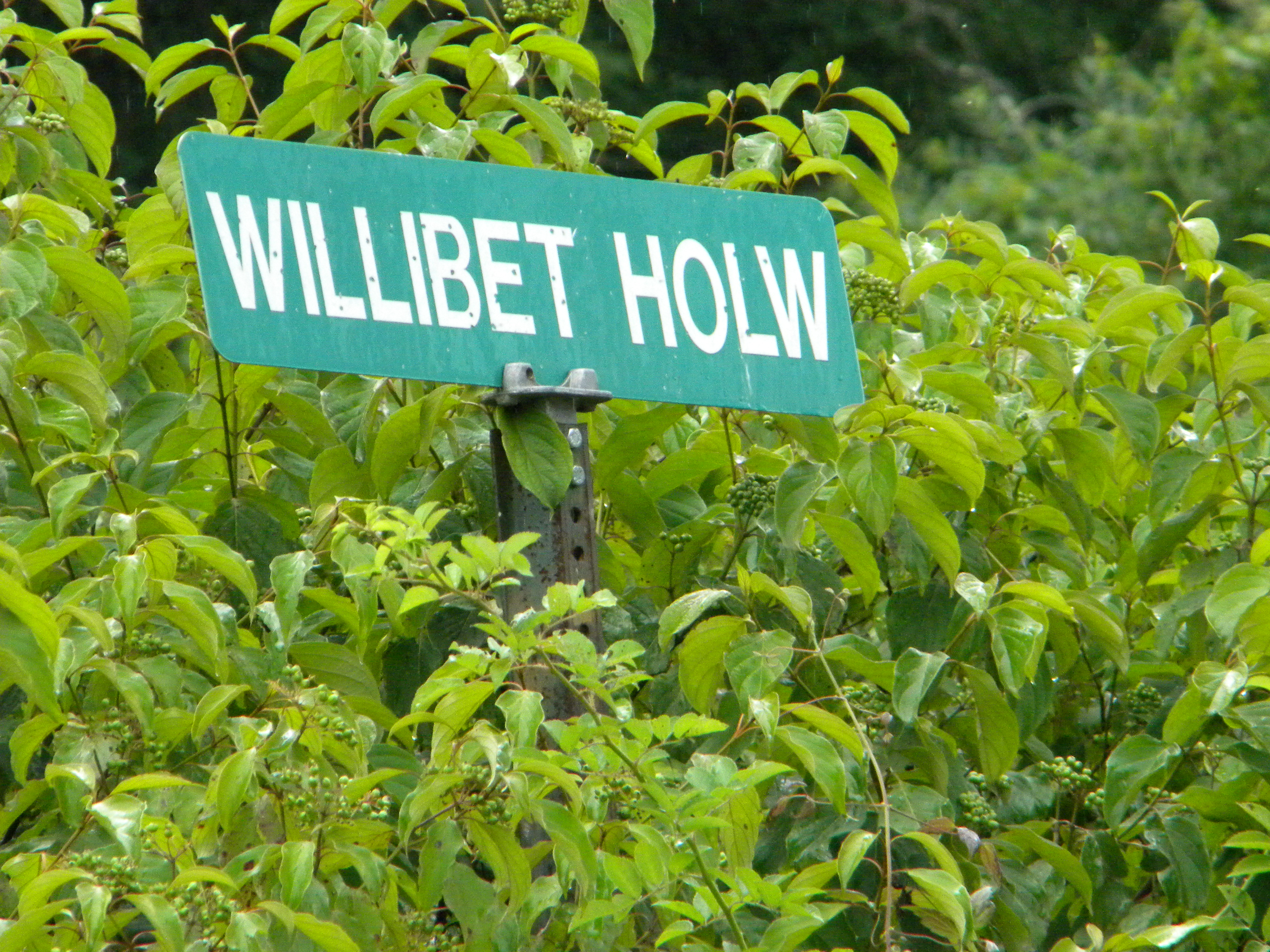
- Street sign for Willibet West Virginia

- Location within West Virginia Location within the United States
- Coordinates: 37°37′05″N 81°11′46″W
- Country: United States
- State: West Virginia
- County: Raleigh
- Elevation: 2,356 ft (718 m)
- Time zone: UTC-5 (Eastern (EST))
  - Summer (DST): UTC-4 (EDT)
- Area codes: 304 & 681
- GNIS feature ID: 1555991

Willibet was an unincorporated community in Raleigh County, West Virginia, United States. Willibet is 6 miles (9.7 km) east-northeast of Rhodell.
