= Helen, West Virginia =

- Census-designated place (CDP)
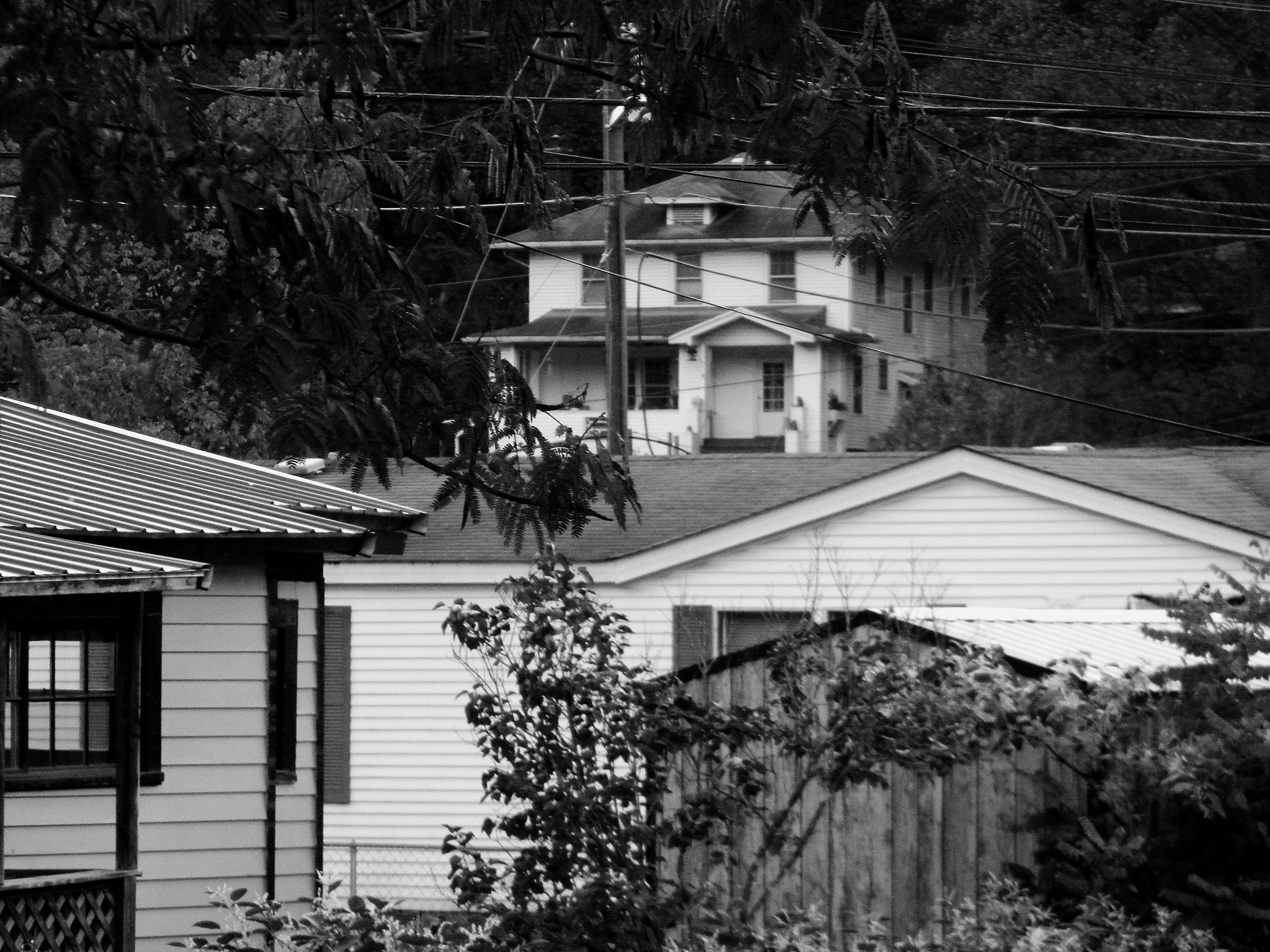
- Street view Helen West Virginia

- Location within West Virginia
- Coordinates: 37°38′15″N 81°18′47″W
- Country: United States
- State: West Virginia
- County: Raleigh

Area
  - Total: 0.238 sq mi (0.62 km^{2})
  - Land: 0.238 sq mi (0.62 km^{2})
  - Water: 0 sq mi (0 km^{2})
- Elevation: 1,732 ft (528 m)

Population (2020)
  - Total: 137
  - Density: 576/sq mi (222/km^{2})
- Time zone: UTC-5 (Eastern (EST))
  - Summer (DST): UTC-4 (CDT)
- ZIP codes: 25853
- GNIS feature ID: 2586823

Helen is a census-designated place (CDP) in Raleigh County, West Virginia, United States. As of the 2020 census, its population was 137 (down from 219 at the 2010 census). West Virginia Route 16, Winding Gulf and railroad tracks run right through the community.

The Helen mine and coal camp was opened in the 1910s by the East Gulf Coal Company. Many years later, the mine was operated by the Koppers Coal company, which then became the Eastern Gas & Fuel - Coal Division, and even later Eastern Associated Coal Company. Eastern Associated operated the Helen mine into the 1980s.
