= Skelton, West Virginia =

- Unincorporated community
- Location within West Virginia Location within the United States
- Coordinates: 37°48′38″N 81°11′14″W
- Country: United States
- State: West Virginia
- County: Raleigh
- Elevation: 2,307 ft (703 m)
- Time zone: UTC-5 (Eastern (EST))
  - Summer (DST): UTC-4 (EDT)
- ZIP code: 25919
- Area codes: 304 & 681
- GNIS feature ID: 1555636

Skelton is an unincorporated community in Raleigh County, West Virginia, United States. It is located on U.S. Route 19, 2 miles (3.2 km) north of downtown Beckley. It has a post office with ZIP code 25919.

The community was named after Skelton, England, the native home of a mining official.
