= Besoco, West Virginia =

Unincorporated community in West Virginia, United States

- Unincorporated community
- Location within West Virginia Location within the United States
- Coordinates: 37°37′39″N 81°14′27″W
- Country: United States
- State: West Virginia
- County: Raleigh
- Elevation: 1,818 ft (554 m)
- Time zone: UTC-5 (Eastern (EST))
  - Summer (DST): UTC-4 (EDT)
- ZIP codes: 25815
- Area codes: 304 & 681
- GNIS feature ID: 1535674

Besoco is an unincorporated community in Raleigh County, West Virginia, United States. Besoco is 5.5 miles (8.9 km) south of Sophia.

The name Besoco is an amalgamation of the Beckley Smokeless Coal Company.
