= Amigo, West Virginia =

Unincorporated community in West Virginia, United States

Amigo
- Unincorporated community
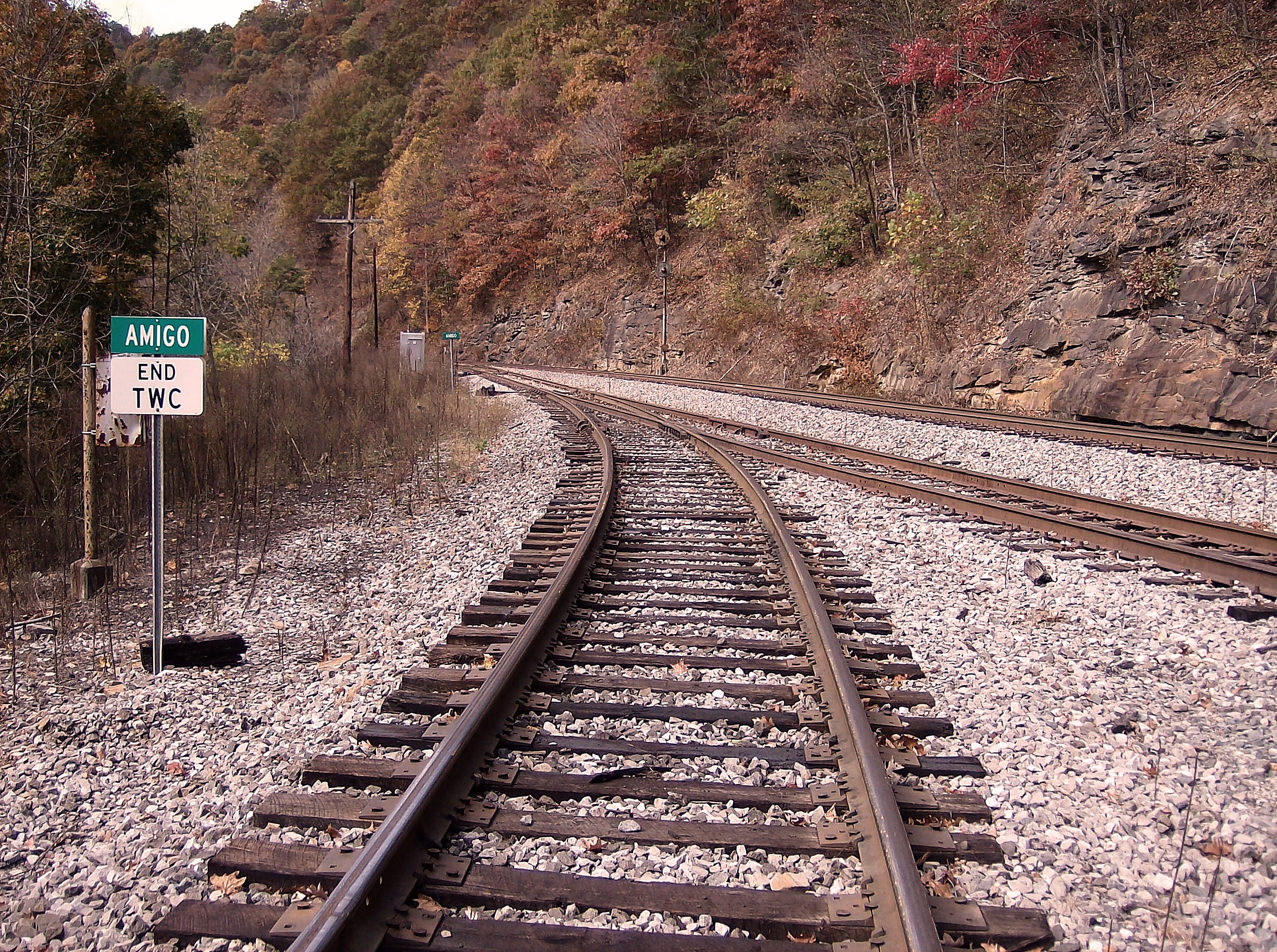
- Amigo, West Virginia

- Location within the state of West Virginia Amigo (the United States)
- Coordinates: 37°35′19″N 81°20′50″W
- Country: United States
- State: West Virginia
- County: Raleigh
- Elevation: 1,580 ft (480 m)
- Time zone: UTC-5 (Eastern (EST))
  - Summer (DST): UTC-4 (EDT)
- ZIP code: 25811
- GNIS feature ID: 1534921

Amigo is an unincorporated community in Raleigh County, West Virginia, United States. The community is located on West Virginia Route 16 at the confluence of the Guyandotte River and Winding Gulf. The Amigo Post Office closed on October 22, 2011; it was established in 1915.

== Amigo Coal Company ==
The community most likely derives its name from the Amigo Coal Company, based on a conversation with the principal at Amigo in 1935.

The Amigo Coal Company is listed in the "Annual Report of the Department of Mines For the Fiscal Year Ending June 30, 1920" in Raleigh County with company name "Amigo Coal Company", mine name "Amigo", and post office "Amigo".
