= Wright, West Virginia =

Wright
- Unincorporated community
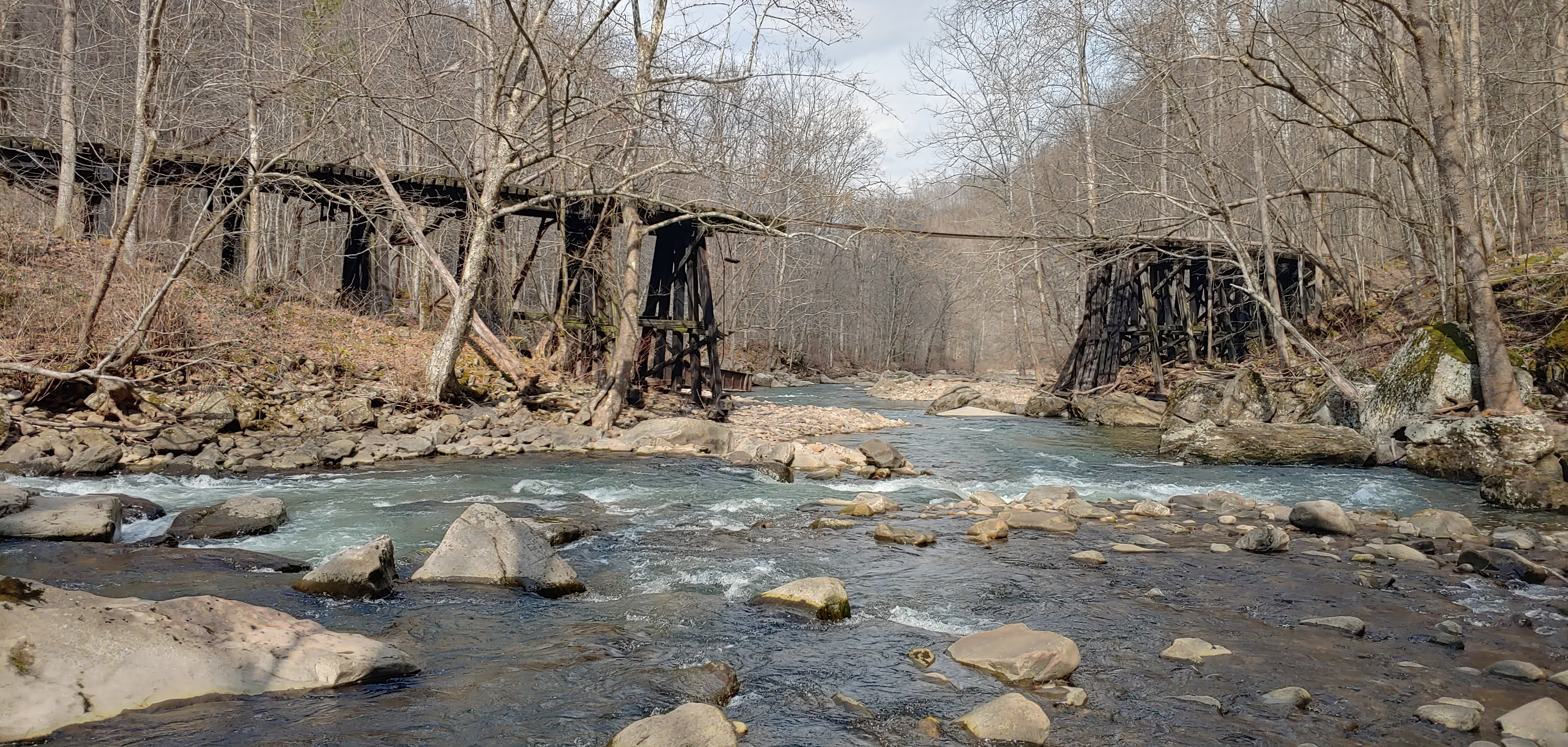

- Location within the state of West Virginia Wright (the United States)
- Coordinates: 37°49′40″N 81°6′6″W
- Country: United States
- State: West Virginia
- County: Raleigh
- Elevation: 1,312 ft (400 m)
- Time zone: UTC-5 (Eastern (EST))
  - Summer (DST): UTC-4 (EDT)
- GNIS ID: 1556027

Wright is an unincorporated community in Raleigh County, West Virginia, United States.
