= Lillybrook, West Virginia =

- Unincorporated community
- Location within West Virginia Location within the United States
- Coordinates: 37°38′41″N 81°13′13″W
- Country: United States
- State: West Virginia
- County: Raleigh
- Elevation: 2,051 ft (625 m)
- Time zone: UTC-5 (Eastern (EST))
  - Summer (DST): UTC-4 (EDT)
- Area codes: 304 & 681
- GNIS feature ID: 1549784

Lillybrook is an unincorporated community in Raleigh County, West Virginia, United States. Lillybrook is 4.5 miles (7.2 km) south-southeast of Sophia.

The community's name is an amalgamation of Lilly and Hornbrook, the surnames of two businessmen in the local mining industry.
