= Tams, West Virginia =

- Unincorporated community
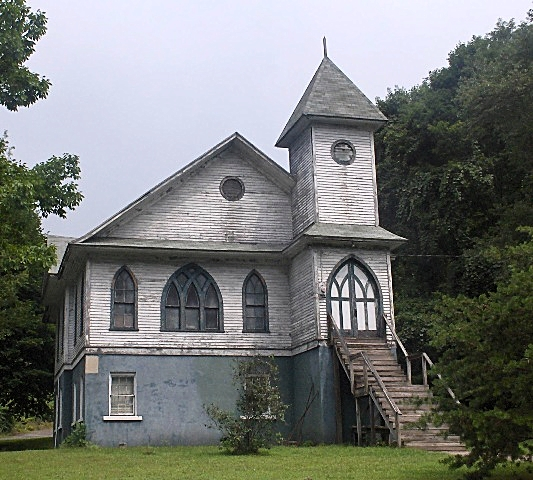
- New Salem Baptist Church at Tams West Virginia

- Location within West Virginia Location within the United States
- Coordinates: 37°39′53″N 81°18′27″W
- Country: United States
- State: West Virginia
- County: Raleigh
- Elevation: 1,719 ft (524 m)
- Time zone: UTC-5 (Eastern (EST))
  - Summer (DST): UTC-4 (EDT)
- Area codes: 304 & 681
- GNIS feature ID: 1555778

Tams is an unincorporated community in Raleigh County, West Virginia, United States. Tams is located on West Virginia Route 16 and Winding Gulf, 4 miles (6.4 km) southwest of Sophia.

Construction of the town started in May 1909 by the Gulf Smokeless Coal Company, which was mining the Beckley coal seam. Serviced by the Virginian Railway, the town initially included 125 houses. By 1920, that number had increased to 185, with a population of 1250. Running water, and electricity for house lights, were supplied water from the town water supply, and power house.
