= Pemberton, West Virginia =

- Unincorporated community
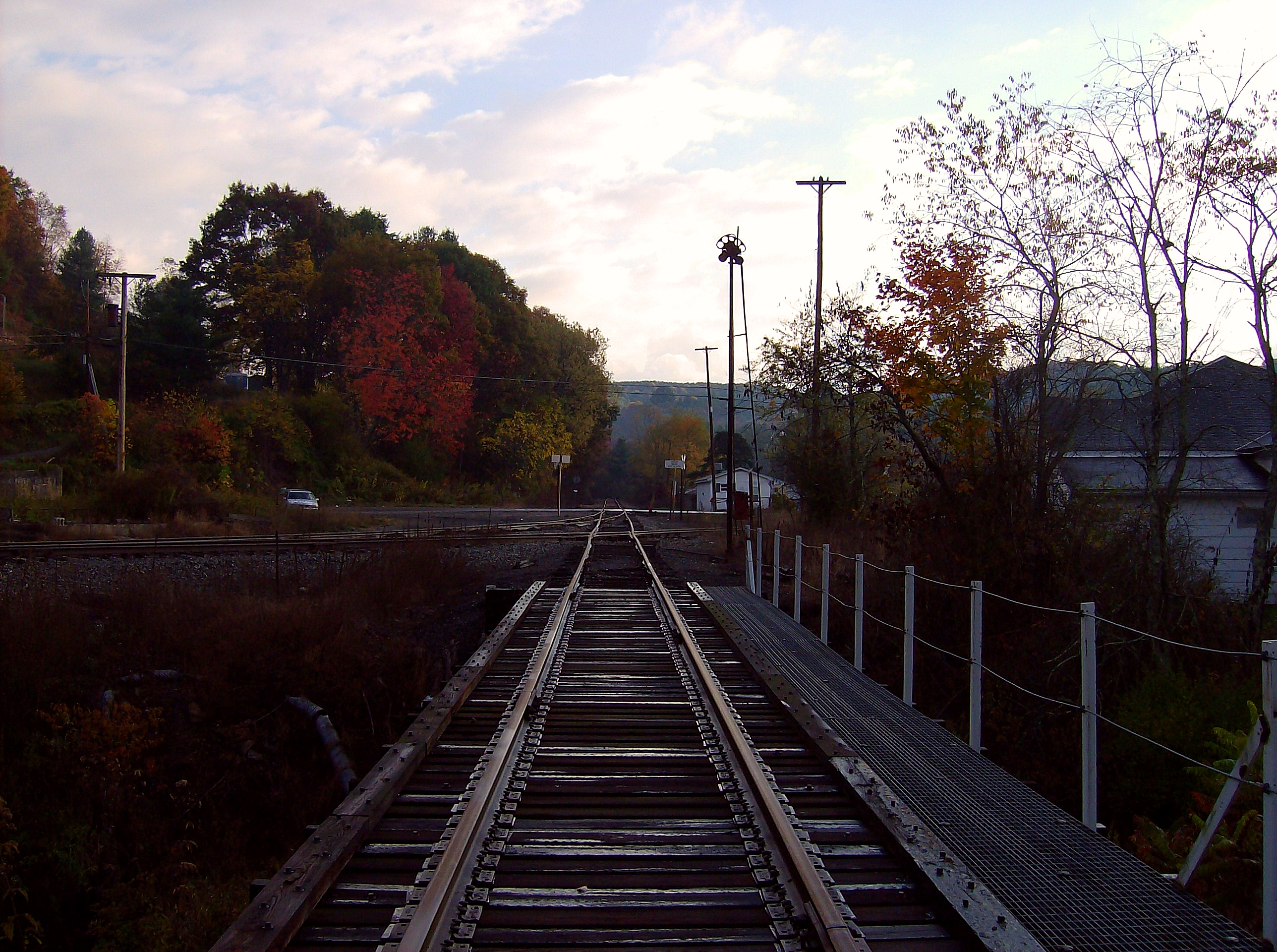
- Pemberton, West Virginia in the Fall

- Location within West Virginia Location within the United States
- Coordinates: 37°43′04″N 81°13′08″W
- Country: United States
- State: West Virginia
- County: Raleigh
- Elevation: 2,257 ft (688 m)
- Time zone: UTC-5 (Eastern (EST))
  - Summer (DST): UTC-4 (EDT)
- ZIP code: 25905
- Area codes: 304 & 681
- GNIS feature ID: 1544696

Pemberton is an unincorporated community in Raleigh County, West Virginia, United States. Pemberton is 2 miles (3.2 km) east-northeast of Sophia. The Pemberton post office closed on January 23, 1993, with Mrs. Gladys G. St.Clair serving as the last postmaster.
