= Abney, West Virginia =

Unincorporated community in West Virginia, United States

- Unincorporated community
- Location within West Virginia Location within the United States
- Coordinates: 37°41′18″N 81°12′14″W
- Country: United States
- State: West Virginia
- County: Raleigh
- Elevation: 2,546 ft (776 m)
- Time zone: UTC-5 (Eastern (EST))
  - Summer (DST): UTC-4 (EDT)
- Area codes: 304 & 681
- GNIS feature ID: 1553687

Abney is an unincorporated community in Raleigh County, West Virginia, United States. Abney is 3 miles (4.8 km) southeast of Sophia. Abney was once known as Phillips.
