= Edwight, West Virginia =

Unincorporated community in West Virginia, United States

Edwight
- Unincorporated community
- Location within the state of West Virginia Edwight (the United States)
- Coordinates: 37°53′4″N 81°31′56″W
- Country: United States
- State: West Virginia
- County: Raleigh
- Elevation: 984 ft (300 m)
- Time zone: UTC-5 (Eastern (EST))
  - Summer (DST): UTC-4 (EDT)
- GNIS ID: 1538565

Edwight is an unincorporated community in Raleigh County, West Virginia. Edwight was also known as Launa.
