= Glen White, West Virginia =

- Census-designated place (CDP)
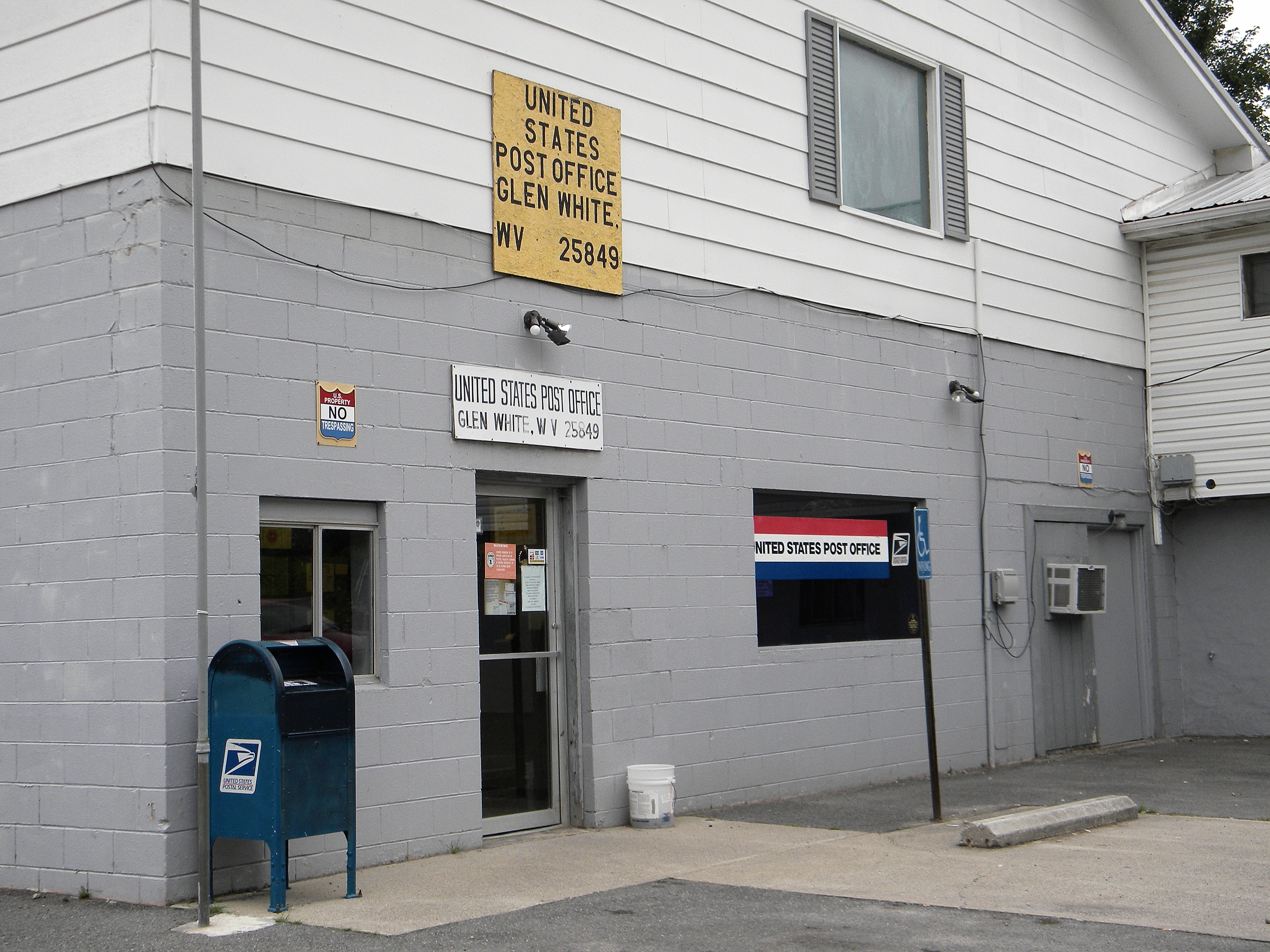
- Glen White West Virginia Post Office

- Location within West Virginia
- Coordinates: 37°43′48″N 81°16′47″W
- Country: United States
- State: West Virginia
- County: Raleigh

Area
  - Total: 0.506 sq mi (1.31 km^{2})
  - Land: 0.506 sq mi (1.31 km^{2})
  - Water: 0 sq mi (0 km^{2})
- Elevation: 2,159 ft (658 m)

Population (2020)
  - Total: 245
  - Density: 484/sq mi (187/km^{2})
- Time zone: UTC-5 (Eastern (EST))
  - Summer (DST): UTC-4 (EDT)
- ZIP code: 25849
- Area codes: 304 & 681
- GNIS feature ID: 2586815

Glen White is a census-designated place (CDP) in Raleigh County, West Virginia, United States. Glen White is located on state routes 54 and 97, 1 mile (1.6 km) southeast of Lester. Glen White had a post office (now closed) with ZIP code 25849. As of the 2020 census, its population was 245 (down from 266 at the 2010 census).

The community derives its name from E. E. White, the proprietor of a local coal mine.
