= Lego, West Virginia =

- Unincorporated community
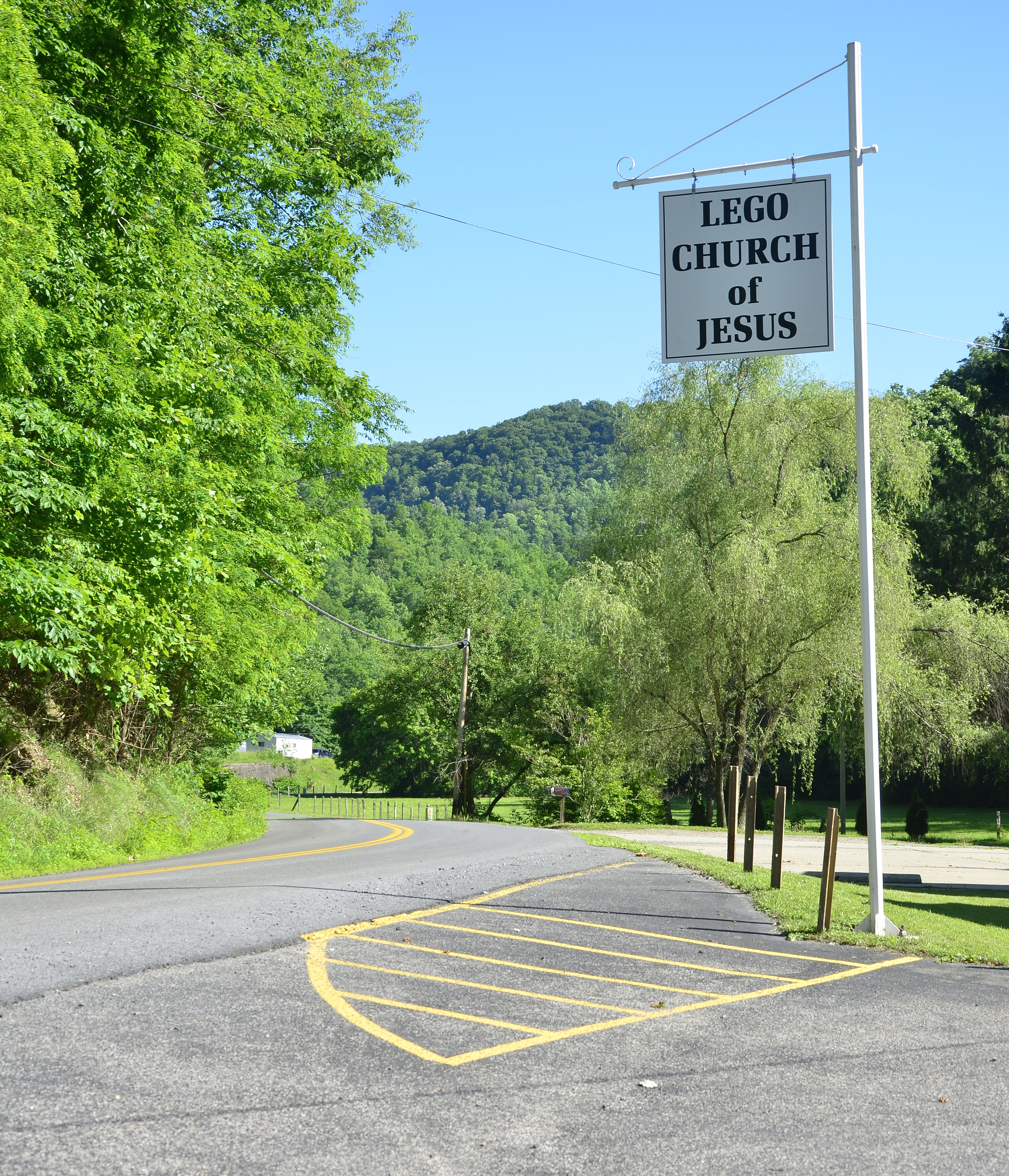
- Coal City Road in Lego

- Location within West Virginia Location within the United States
- Coordinates: 37°38′02″N 81°14′19″W
- Country: United States
- State: West Virginia
- County: Raleigh
- Elevation: 1,847 ft (563 m)
- Time zone: UTC-5 (Eastern (EST))
  - Summer (DST): UTC-4 (EDT)
- Area codes: 304 & 681
- GNIS feature ID: 1549781

Lego is an unincorporated community in Raleigh County, West Virginia, United States. Lego is 5 miles (8.0 km) south-southeast of Sophia. It was developed as a mining town by the Fire Creek Smokeless Fuel Company.
