= McAlpin, Raleigh County, West Virginia =

McAlpin, West Virginia
- Unincorporated community
- Location within West Virginia Location within the United States
- Coordinates: 37°41′30″N 81°16′40″W
- Country: United States
- State: West Virginia
- County: Raleigh
- Elevation: 1,913 ft (583 m)
- Time zone: UTC-5 (Eastern (EST))
  - Summer (DST): UTC-4 (EDT)
- Area codes: 304 & 681
- GNIS feature ID: 1555075

McAlpin is an unincorporated community in Raleigh County, West Virginia, United States. McAlpin is located on County Route 30 and Winding Gulf, 1.9 miles (3.1 km) west-southwest of Sophia.

The community was named after the local MacAlpin Coal Company.
