= Terry, West Virginia =

- Unincorporated community
- Location within West Virginia Location within the United States
- Coordinates: 37°51′39″N 81°05′56″W
- Country: United States
- State: West Virginia
- County: Raleigh
- Elevation: 1,188 ft (362 m)
- Time zone: UTC-5 (Eastern (EST))
  - Summer (DST): UTC-4 (EDT)
- Area codes: 304 & 681
- GNIS feature ID: 1555792

Terry is an unincorporated community in Raleigh County, West Virginia, United States. Terry is located on the New River, 4 miles (6.4 km) southeast of Mount Hope.

The community was named for the son of a mining official.
