= Woodbay, West Virginia =

Woodbay
- Unincorporated community
- Location within the state of West Virginia Woodbay (the United States)
- Coordinates: 37°41′32″N 81°15′54″W
- Country: United States
- State: West Virginia
- County: Raleigh
- Elevation: 1,936 ft (590 m)
- Time zone: UTC-5 (Eastern (EST))
  - Summer (DST): UTC-4 (EDT)
- GNIS ID: 2747536

Woodbay was an unincorporated community and coal town in Raleigh County, West Virginia.
