= Stotesbury, West Virginia =

Stotesbury
- Unincorporated community
- Location within the state of West Virginia Stotesbury (the United States)
- Coordinates: 37°40′54″N 81°17′19″W
- Country: United States
- State: West Virginia
- County: Raleigh
- Elevation: 1,841 ft (561 m)
- Time zone: UTC-5 (Eastern (EST))
  - Summer (DST): UTC-4 (EDT)
- ZIP codes: 25929
- GNIS feature ID: 1555722

Stotesbury is an unincorporated community and former coal town in Raleigh County in the U.S. state of West Virginia that flourished during the 1930s. The community was named for Edward T. Stotesbury, then the president of Beaver Coal Company.

Stotesbury was the home of the late eight-term U.S. Senator Robert C. Byrd. Currently there are only a handful of houses left from the once bustling town.

== Mining ==
The Stotesbury mining camp is located in the Winding Gulf Coalfield. It was originally operated by the E.E. White Coal Co. and named for Edward T. Stotesbury, who was president of Beaver Coal Co. at the time. Mining was in the Beckley seam. In the late 1930s, the Koppers Coal Company took over coal mining operations in Stotesbury, which ended in 1958. In the mid-1960s, Eastern Associated Coal rebuilt the mine and operated in Stotesbury until the mid-1980s. White Mountain LLC rebuilt the mine in 2001, but closed it down one year later, in 2002.

== Other buildings ==
Stotesbury's St. John's Baptist Church has fallen into total ruin and as of 2013, only the foundation stones remain. St. John's Baptist Church was listed as an "Endangered Building" by the National Trust for Historic Preservation. The owners of the Stotesbury Coal Camp are still affiliated with Beaver Coal Company in 2006.

The Stotesbury Community church is still active The town itself does still have original residential housing.

== Gallery ==
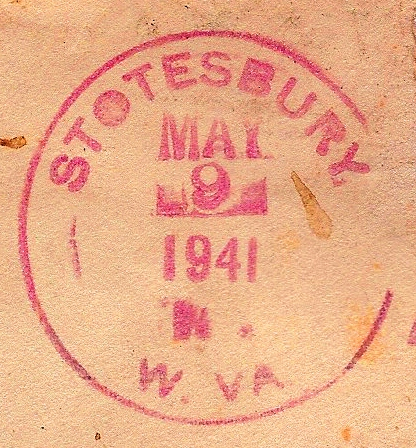
Stotesbury postmark

== See also ==
- List of ghost towns in West Virginia
