= Metalton, West Virginia =

Metalton
- Unincorporated community
- Location within the state of West Virginia Metalton (the United States)
- Coordinates: 37°46′0″N 81°17′22″W
- Country: United States
- State: West Virginia
- County: Raleigh
- Elevation: 2,257 ft (688 m)
- Time zone: UTC-5 (Eastern (EST))
  - Summer (DST): UTC-4 (EDT)
- GNIS ID: 1558374

Metalton is an unincorporated community in Raleigh County, West Virginia, United States.

The community most likely was so named on account of nearby coal and steel manufacturing.
