= Winding Gulf, West Virginia =

- Unincorporated community
- Location within West Virginia Location within the United States
- Coordinates: 37°40′41″N 81°14′23″W
- Country: United States
- State: West Virginia
- County: Raleigh
- Elevation: 2,264 ft (690 m)
- Time zone: UTC-5 (Eastern (EST))
  - Summer (DST): UTC-4 (EDT)
- Area codes: 304 & 681
- GNIS feature ID: 1556003

Winding Gulf is an unincorporated community in Raleigh County, West Virginia, United States. Winding Gulf is located on Winding Gulf, south of Sophia.

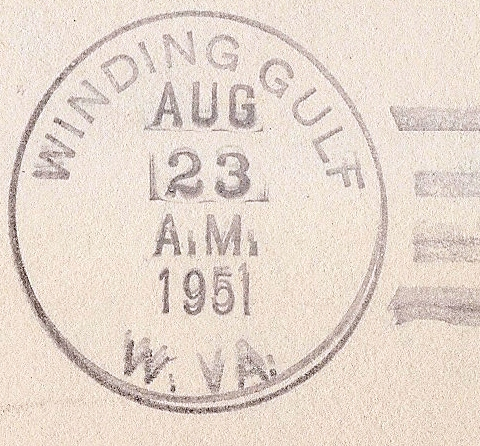

== History ==
Justis Collins (Coal Baron) built coal camps in Winding Gulf in 1910. There were over 50 miners who died in the mines at Winding Gulf over the years. The mines were served by the Virginian Railroad. There were several collieries in Winding Gulf such as, No. 1 camp, No. 2 camp, Lynwynn camp, Epperly Hill, and Farley Hill. Winding Gulf was the third largest town in Raleigh County in the 1920s. Mining in Winding Gulf lasted into the late 1980s.
