= Sullivan, Raleigh County, West Virginia =

Sullivan, West Virginia
- Unincorporated community
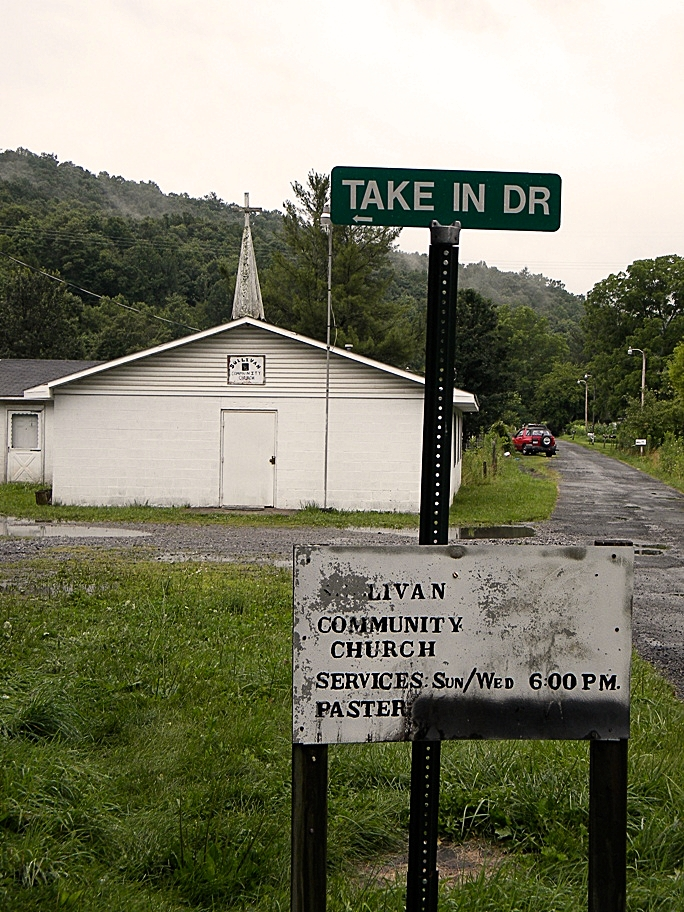
- Sullivan, West Virginia along Take In Drive

- Location within West Virginia Location within the United States
- Coordinates: 37°42′13″N 81°11′39″W
- Country: United States
- State: West Virginia
- County: Raleigh
- Elevation: 2,261 ft (689 m)
- Time zone: UTC-5 (Eastern (EST))
  - Summer (DST): UTC-4 (EDT)
- ZIP codes: 25930
- Area codes: 304 & 681
- GNIS feature ID: 1555739

Sullivan is an unincorporated community in Raleigh County, West Virginia, United States. Sullivan is 3 miles (4.8 km) east of Sophia. The Sullivan post office has been closed.
