= Lynwinn, West Virginia =

Lynwinn
- Unincorporated community
- Location within the state of West Virginia Lynwinn (the United States)
- Coordinates: 37°40′51″N 81°13′38″W
- Country: United States
- State: West Virginia
- County: Raleigh
- Elevation: 2,608 ft (795 m)
- Time zone: UTC-5 (Eastern (EST))
  - Summer (DST): UTC-4 (EDT)
- GNIS feature ID: 1542655

Lynwinn is an unincorporated community and coal town located in Raleigh County, West Virginia, United States.
