= Pickshin, West Virginia =

- Unincorporated community
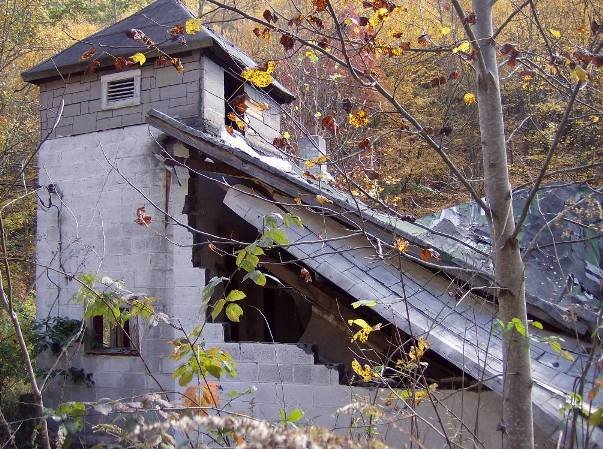
- Church at Pickshin West Virginia

- Location within West Virginia Location within the United States
- Coordinates: 37°38′30″N 81°13′41″W
- Country: United States
- State: West Virginia
- County: Raleigh
- Elevation: 1,991 ft (607 m)
- Time zone: UTC-5 (Eastern (EST))
  - Summer (DST): UTC-4 (EDT)
- Area codes: 304 & 681
- GNIS feature ID: 1544803

Pickshin was an unincorporated community and coal town in Raleigh County, West Virginia, United States. Pickshin is 5 miles (8.0 km) south-southeast of Sophia. There are no inhabitants. During the years of 1917–27, it was documented to have mined 785,054 tons of coal.
