= Whitesville, West Virginia =

- Town
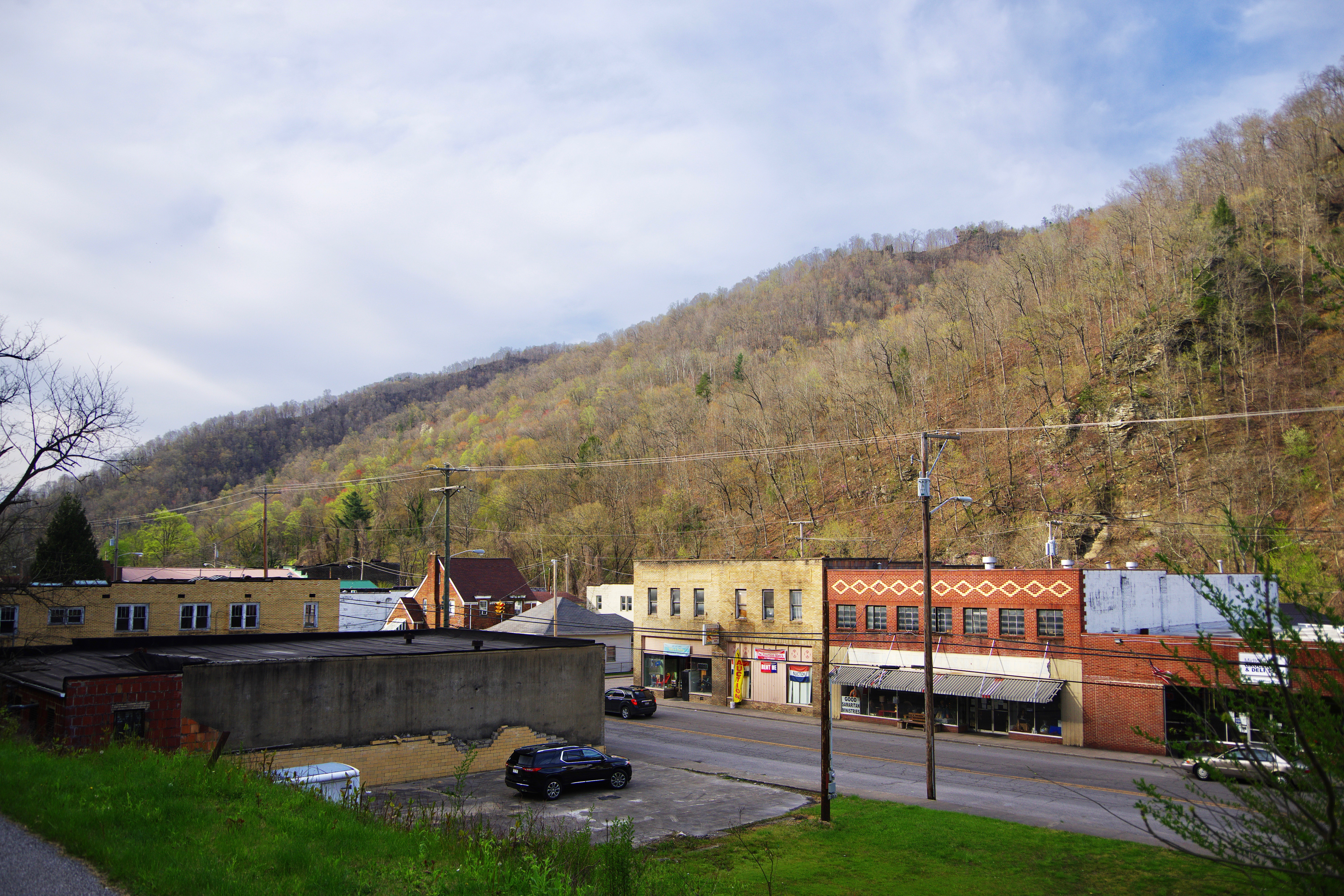
- Whitesville

- Logo

- Location of Whitesville in Boone County, West Virginia.
- Coordinates: 37°58′53″N 81°32′3″W
- Country: United States
- State: West Virginia
- County: Boone
- Incorporated: 1935

Area
  - Total: 0.33 sq mi (0.86 km^{2})
  - Land: 0.31 sq mi (0.80 km^{2})
  - Water: 0.023 sq mi (0.06 km^{2})
- Elevation: 837 ft (255 m)

Population (2020)
  - Total: 361
  - Estimate (2021): 351
  - Density: 1,390.2/sq mi (536.74/km^{2})
- Time zone: UTC-5 (Eastern (EST))
  - Summer (DST): UTC-4 (EDT)
- ZIP code: 25209
- Area code: 304
- FIPS code: 54-86836
- GNIS feature ID: 1555976

Whitesville is a town and former coal town in Boone County, West Virginia, United States, along the Big Coal River. The population was 361 at the 2020 census. Whitesville was incorporated on August 15, 1935, by the Boone County Circuit Court. The town derives its name from B. W. White, a pioneer settler. Whitesville was formerly known as Jarrold's Valley and Pritchard City.

== Geography ==
Whitesville is located at 37°58′53″N 81°32′03″W (37.981297, -81.534055). The town occupies a narrow section of land along both sides of the Big Coal River that stretches from the river's confluence with Toms Branch on the south to just north of the river's confluence with Seng Creek. West Virginia Route 3 (Coal River Road) traverses Whitesville, connecting the town with Sylvester to the northwest and the Beckley area to the southeast.

According to the United States Census Bureau, the town has a total area of 0.33 square miles (0.85 km^{2}), of which 0.31 square miles (0.80 km^{2}) is land and 0.02 square miles (0.05 km^{2}) is water.

== Demographics ==
Historical population
Census	Pop.	Note	%±
1940	942		—
1950	1,017		8.0%
1960	774		−23.9%
1970	781		0.9%
1980	689		−11.8%
1990	486		−29.5%
2000	520		7.0%
2010	514		−1.2%
2020	361		−29.8%
2021 (est.)	351	▼	−2.8%
U.S. Decennial Census

=== 2010 census ===
As of the census of 2010, there were 514 people, 247 households, and 125 families living in the town. The population density was 1,658.1 inhabitants per square mile (640.2/km^{2}). There were 304 housing units at an average density of 980.6 per square mile (378.6/km^{2}). The racial makeup of the town was 98.1% White, 0.2% African American, and 1.8% from two or more races.

There were 247 households, of which 23.1% had children under the age of 18 living with them, 36.4% were married couples living together, 12.1% had a female householder with no husband present, 2.0% had a male householder with no wife present, and 49.4% were non-families. 44.5% of all households were made up of individuals, and 20.6% had someone living alone who was 65 years of age or older. The average household size was 2.08 and the average family size was 2.92.

The median age in the town was 42.5 years. 20.4% of residents were under the age of 18; 8.5% were between the ages of 18 and 24; 24.7% were from 25 to 44; 28% were from 45 to 64; and 18.5% were 65 years of age or older. The gender makeup of the town was 47.7% male and 52.3% female.

=== 2000 census ===
As of the census of 2000, there were 520 people, 255 households, and 139 families living in the town. The population density was 1,244.7 inhabitants per square mile (478.0/km^{2}). There were 346 housing units at an average density of 828.2 per square mile (318.1/km^{2}). The racial makeup of the town was 99.23% White, 0.19% African American, 0.19% Native American, 0.19% Asian, and 0.19% from two or more races. Hispanic or Latino of any race were 0.38% of the population.

There were 255 households, out of which 18.0% had children under the age of 18 living with them, 38.0% were married couples living together, 12.5% had a female householder with no husband present, and 45.1% were non-families. 42.4% of all households were made up of individuals, and 21.2% had someone living alone who was 65 years of age or older. The average household size was 2.04 and the average family size was 2.75.

In the town, the population was spread out, with 17.3% under the age of 18, 11.3% from 18 to 24, 21.3% from 25 to 44, 27.7% from 45 to 64, and 22.3% who were 65 years of age or older. The median age was 45 years. For every 100 females, there were 84.4 males. For every 100 females age 18 and over, there were 82.2 males.

The median income for a household in the town was $19,250, and the median income for a family was $31,500. Males had a median income of $26,250 versus $15,417 for females. The per capita income for the town was $13,217. About 23.1% of families and 29.9% of the population were below the poverty line, including 40.2% of those under age 18 and 15.0% of those age 65 or over.

== Upper Big Branch Miners Memorial ==
Whitesville is home to the Upper Big Branch Miners Memorial, a monument dedicated to the miners who were killed in the Upper Big Branch Mine disaster in nearby Montcoal in April 2010.
