= Big Stick, West Virginia =

Unincorporated community in West Virginia, United States

Big Stick
- Unincorporated community
- Location within the state of West Virginia Big Stick (the United States)
- Coordinates: 37°41′45″N 81°15′12″W
- Country: United States
- State: West Virginia
- County: Raleigh
- Time zone: UTC-5 (Eastern (EST))
  - Summer (DST): UTC-4 (EDT)

Big Stick was an unincorporated community in Raleigh County, West Virginia, United States. It lies along County Route 3/2, beside Winding Gulf. This community is part of the Winding Gulf Coalfield in Raleigh County.

== Name ==
This community got its name from Theodore Roosevelt's Big Stick Policy, which was based on a West African proverb, "Speak softly and carry a big stick."
