= Fireco, West Virginia =

Unincorporated community in West Virginia, United States

Fireco
- unincorporated community
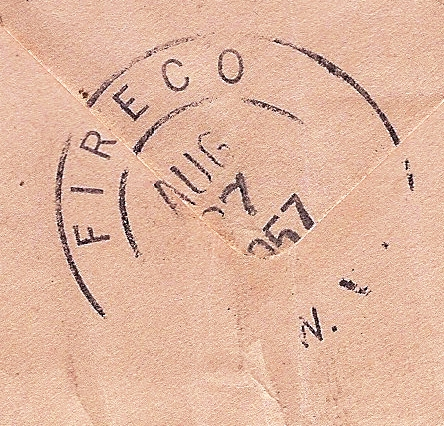
- Fireco West Virginia Postmark

- Location within the state of West Virginia Fireco (the United States)
- Coordinates: 37°38′41″N 81°11′53″W
- Country: United States
- State: West Virginia
- County: Raleigh
- Time zone: UTC-5 (Eastern (EST))
  - Summer (DST): UTC-4 (EDT)
- ZIP codes: 25823
- GNIS feature ID: 1554455

Fireco is an unincorporated community coal town in Raleigh County, West Virginia, United States. It lies in the Winding Gulf Coalfield of the southern part of the state. The name Fireco denotes the amount of heat the specific coal mined there could produce. This name was once a common descriptor.
