= Montcoal, West Virginia =

- Unincorporated community
- Location within West Virginia Location within the United States
- Coordinates: 37°54′50″N 81°32′08″W
- Country: United States
- State: West Virginia
- County: Raleigh
- Elevation: 938 ft (286 m)
- Time zone: UTC-5 (Eastern (EST))
  - Summer (DST): UTC-4 (EDT)
- Area codes: 304 & 681
- GNIS feature ID: 1555151

Montcoal is an unincorporated community and coal town in Raleigh County, West Virginia, United States. Montcoal is located on West Virginia Route 3, 4.5 miles (7.2 km) south of Whitesville.

== Coal mine explosion ==
Montcoal was home to the Performance Coal Company, a division of Massey Energy, Inc. On April 5, 2010, at approximately 3 pm, a methane gas explosion killed 29 mine workers, and injured two others.
