= Rhodell, West Virginia =

- Census-designated place (CDP)
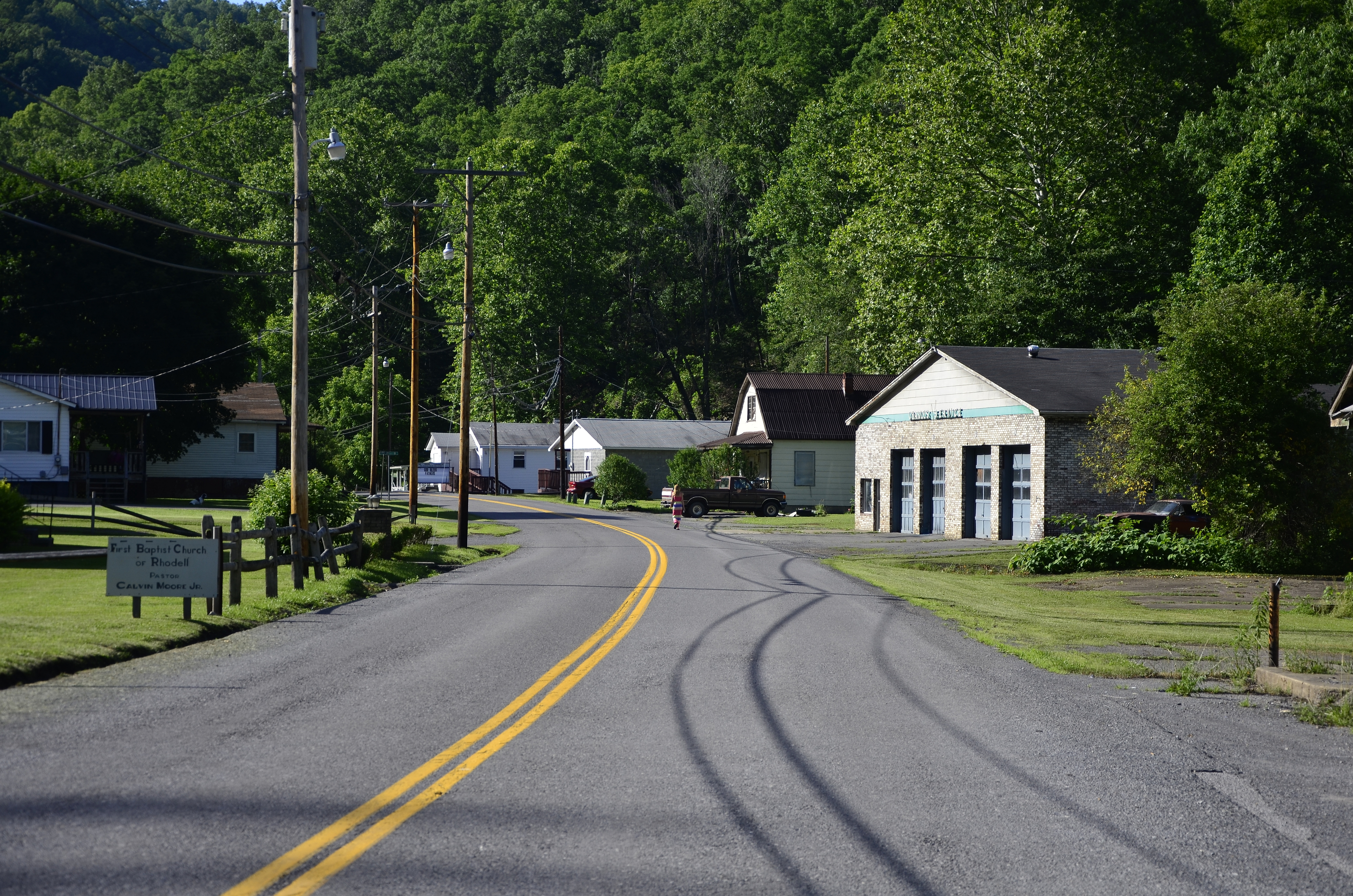
- County Route 33 in Rhodell

- Location of Rhodell in Raleigh County, West Virginia.
- Coordinates: 37°36′29″N 81°18′14″W
- Country: United States
- State: West Virginia
- County: Raleigh

Area
  - Total: 0.31 sq mi (0.81 km^{2})
  - Land: 0.31 sq mi (0.81 km^{2})
  - Water: 0 sq mi (0.00 km^{2})
- Elevation: 1,627 ft (496 m)

Population (2020)
  - Total: 141
  - Estimate (2023): 137
  - Density: 510.3/sq mi (197.02/km^{2})
- Time zone: UTC-5 (Eastern (EST))
  - Summer (DST): UTC-4 (EDT)
- ZIP code: 25915
- Area code: 304
- FIPS code: 54-67996
- GNIS feature ID: 1545524

Rhodell is a census-designated place in Raleigh County, West Virginia, United States. The population was 141 at the 2020 census.

== History ==
It was incorporated in 1937 as a town, but on June 13, 2017, Rhodell residents voted 33–13 to dissolve the town. The town reverted to an unincorporated portion of Raleigh County on July 1, 2017. The United States Census Bureau marked Rhodell as a CDP on August 21, 2025.

== Geography ==
According to the United States Census Bureau, the town has a total area of 0.31 square miles (0.80 km^{2}), all land.

== Demographics ==
Historical population
Census	Pop.	Note	%±
1940	995		—
1950	829		−16.7%
1960	626		−24.5%
1970	500		−20.1%
1980	472		−5.6%
1990	221		−53.2%
2000	234		5.9%
2010	173		−26.1%
2020	141		−18.5%
2023 (est.)	137	▼	−2.8%
U.S. Decennial Census

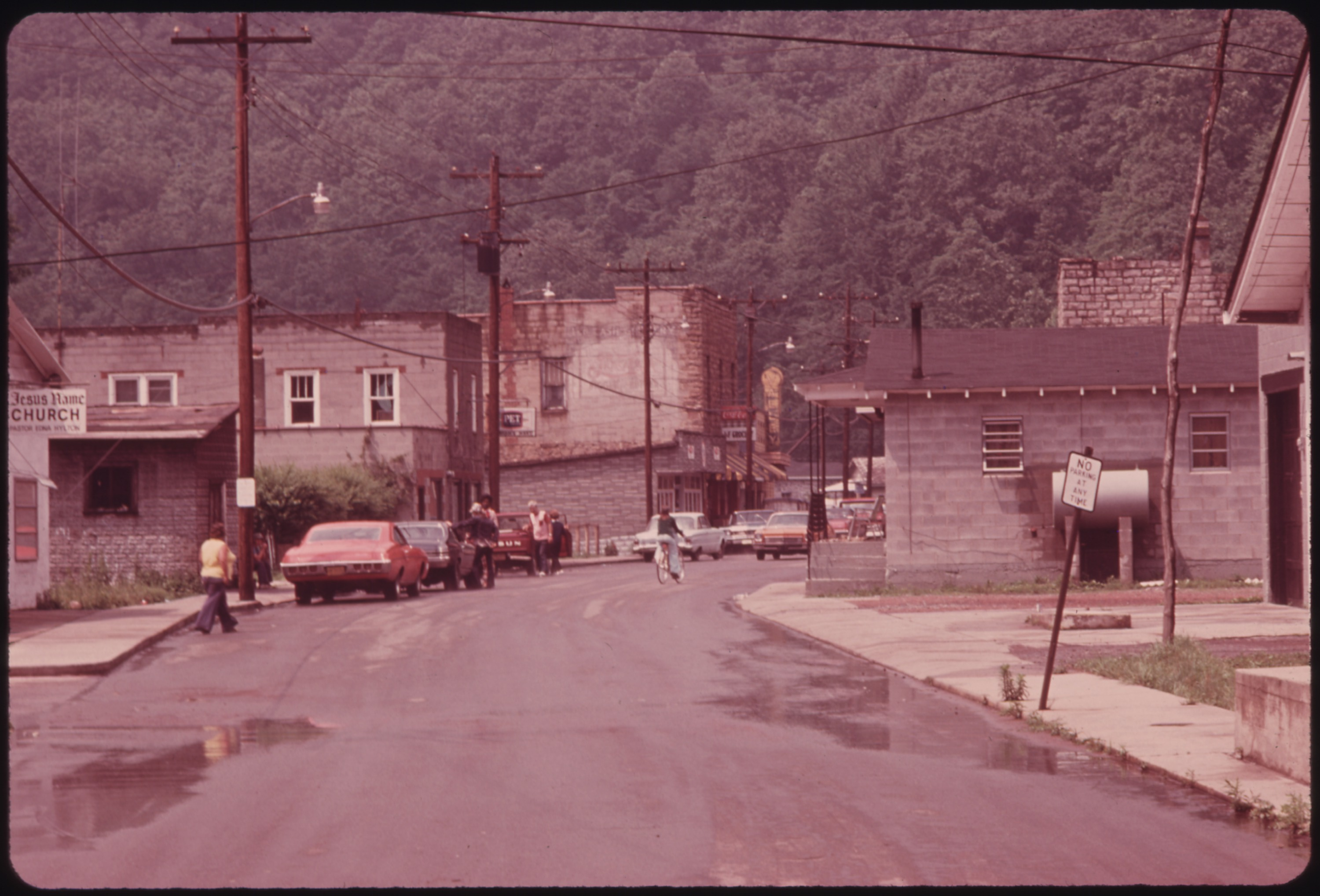
Rhodell in 1974

=== 2010 census ===
As of the census of 2010, there were 173 people, 71 households, and 45 families living in the town. The population density was 558.1 inhabitants per square mile (215.5/km^{2}). There were 95 housing units at an average density of 306.5 per square mile (118.3/km^{2}). The racial makeup of the town was 97.1% White, 2.3% African American, and 0.6% from two or more races.

There were 71 households, of which 32.4% had children under the age of 18 living with them, 53.5% were married couples living together, 4.2% had a female householder with no husband present, 5.6% had a male householder with no wife present, and 36.6% were non-families. 29.6% of all households were made up of individuals, and 11.2% had someone living alone who was 65 years of age or older. The average household size was 2.44 and the average family size was 3.11.

The median age in the town was 38.9 years. 22% of residents were under the age of 18; 10.5% were between the ages of 18 and 24; 26% were from 25 to 44; 28.3% were from 45 to 64; and 13.3% were 65 years of age or older. The gender makeup of the town was 50.9% male and 49.1% female.

=== 2000 census ===
As of the census of 2000, there were 234 people, 93 households, and 66 families living in the town. The population density was 749.6 inhabitants per square mile (291.4/km^{2}). There were 111 housing units at an average density of 355.6 per square mile (138.2/km^{2}). The racial makeup of the town was 97.44% White, 1.28% African American, 0.43% from other races, and 0.85% from two or more races. Hispanic or Latino of any race were 1.28% of the population.

There were 93 households, out of which 29.0% had children under the age of 18 living with them, 58.1% were married couples living together, 8.6% had a female householder with no husband present, and 29.0% were non-families. 26.9% of all households were made up of individuals, and 12.9% had someone living alone who was 65 years of age or older. The average household size was 2.52 and the average family size was 3.02.

In the town, the population was spread out, with 28.2% under the age of 18, 6.8% from 18 to 24, 31.2% from 25 to 44, 23.5% from 45 to 64, and 10.3% who were 65 years of age or older. The median age was 32 years. For every 100 females, there were 98.3 males. For every 100 females age 18 and over, there were 88.8 males.

The median income for a household in the town was $17,143, and the median income for a family was $19,167. Males had a median income of $17,750 versus $18,750 for females. The per capita income for the town was $7,582. About 34.5% of families and 40.7% of the population were below the poverty line, including 61.0% of those under the age of eighteen and 28.6% of those 65 or over.

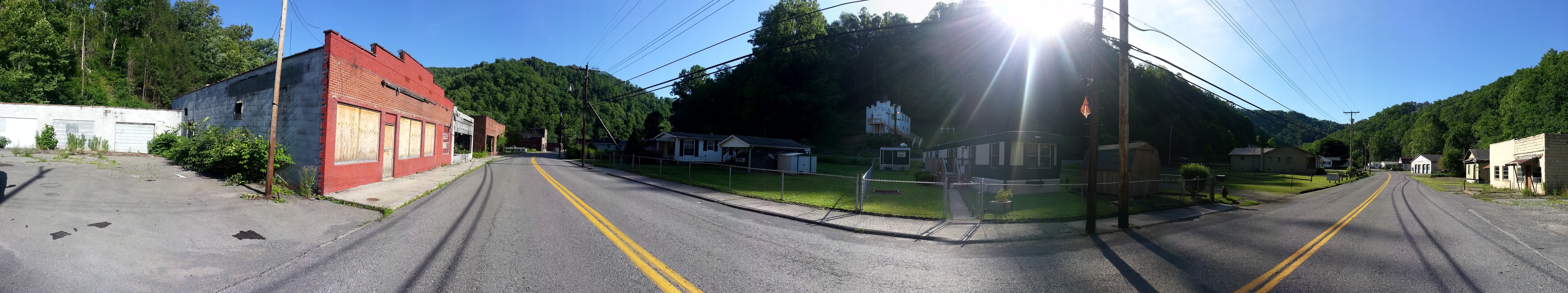
Coal City Road in Rhodell
