= National Register of Historic Places listings in Raleigh County, West Virginia =

Location of Raleigh County in West Virginia

This is a list of the National Register of Historic Places listings in Raleigh County, West Virginia.

This is intended to be a complete list of the properties and districts on the National Register of Historic Places in Raleigh County, West Virginia, United States. The locations of National Register properties and districts for which the latitude and longitude coordinates are included below, may be seen in an online map.

There are 11 properties and districts listed on the National Register in the county.

This National Park Service list is complete through NPS recent listings posted May 1, 2026.

Contents: Counties in West Virginia

Barbour - Berkeley - Boone - Braxton - Brooke - Cabell - Calhoun - Clay - Doddridge - Fayette - Gilmer - Grant - Greenbrier - Hampshire - Hancock - Hardy - Harrison - Jackson - Jefferson - Kanawha - Lewis - Lincoln - Logan - Marion - Marshall - Mason - McDowell - Mercer - Mineral - Mingo - Monongalia - Monroe - Morgan - Nicholas - Ohio - Pendleton - Pleasants - Pocahontas - Preston - Putnam - Raleigh - Randolph - Ritchie - Roane - Summers - Taylor - Tucker - Tyler - Upshur - Wayne - Webster - Wetzel - Wirt - Wood - Wyoming

== Current listings ==
	Name on the Register	Image	Date listed	Location	City or town	Description
1	Beckley Courthouse Square Historic District	Beckley Courthouse Square Historic District	August 31, 1994 (#94000722)	Roughly bounded by Prince, Kanawha, Church, Lebanon, Howe, McCreery and Earwood Sts. and Alaska and First Aves. 37°46′36″N 81°11′16″W	Beckley	
2	Beckley Feed and Hardware Company	Beckley Feed and Hardware Company	August 24, 2001 (#00001309)	405 Prince St. 37°46′36″N 81°11′38″W	Beckley	Demolished in 2013.
3	Beckley Mill Site		May 1, 2017 (#100000947)	Worley Rd. at Piney Cr. 37°46′24″N 81°09′03″W	Beckley	
4	Little Beaver Dam	Little Beaver Dam	April 1, 1998 (#98000287)	Little Beaver State Park off WV 307; 37°45′18″N 81°04′48″W	Crow	
5	New Salem Baptist Church	New Salem Baptist Church	April 12, 2023 (#100008836)	2197 McAlpin Rd. 37°40′28″N 81°18′02″W	Tams	
6	Phillips-Sprague Mine	Phillips-Sprague Mine	March 25, 1988 (#88000266)	New River Park; 37°47′03″N 81°11′46″W	Beckley	
7	St. Colman's Roman Catholic Church and Cemetery	St. Colman's Roman Catholic Church and Cemetery	August 23, 1984 (#84003658)	County Route 26; 37°45′57″N 80°55′16″W	Dillon	
8	Sophia Historic District	Sophia Historic District	March 22, 2006 (#06000163)	Main St., between Polk St. and Riffe St. 37°42′34″N 81°15′07″W	Sophia	
9	Trump-Lilly Farmstead	Trump-Lilly Farmstead	November 8, 1990 (#90001640)	County Route 26/3, 2.5 miles from County Route 26; 37°41′54″N 80°54′01″W	Hinton	
10	Wildwood	Wildwood	August 25, 1970 (#70000665)	117 Laurel Ter. 37°46′18″N 81°10′26″W	Beckley	
11	Wright-Hunter Cemetery		April 2, 2024 (#100010187)	The intersection of Antonio Avenue and Lemp Lane; 37°45′54″N 81°10′19″W	Beckley	

== See also ==
- List of National Historic Landmarks in West Virginia
- National Register of Historic Places listings in West Virginia
- National Register of Historic Places listings in New River Gorge National Park and Preserve
