= National Register of Historic Places listings in New River Gorge National Park and Preserve =

This is a list of the National Register of Historic Places listings in New River Gorge National Park and Preserve.

This is intended to be a complete list of the properties and districts on the National Register of Historic Places in New River Gorge National Park and Preserve, West Virginia, United States. The locations of National Register properties and districts for which the latitude and longitude coordinates are included below, may be seen in a Google map.

There are nine properties and districts listed on the National Register in the park, and one location outside the boundaries of the park, used as an administrative and interpretive site..

This National Park Service list is complete through NPS recent listings posted June 20, 2025.

== Current listings ==
	Name on the Register	Image	Date listed	Location	City or town	Description
1	Bank of Glen Jean	Bank of Glen Jean	February 10, 1983 (#83003236)	Main St. 37°55′42″N 81°09′19″W	Glen Jean	In a detached part of the park
2	Kay Moor	Kay Moor	November 8, 1990 (#90001641)	Along the New River south of U.S. Route 19; 38°02′52″N 81°03′53″W	Fayetteville	
3	New Deal Resources in Babcock State Park Historic District		March 5, 2020 (#100003518)	486 Babcock Rd. 37°59′43″N 80°57′14″W	Clifftop	
4	New River Gorge Bridge	New River Gorge Bridge	August 14, 2013 (#13000603)	US 19 over New River; 38°04′06″N 81°05′00″W	Fayetteville	
5	Nuttallburg Coal Mining Complex and Town Historic District	Nuttallburg Coal Mining Complex and Town Historic District	August 22, 2007 (#07000846)	County Route 85/2; 38°03′02″N 81°02′33″W	Edmond	
6	Prince Brothers General Store-Berry Store	Prince Brothers General Store-Berry Store	April 17, 1986 (#86000810)	WV 41; 37°51′22″N 81°03′49″W	Prince	
7	St. Colman's Roman Catholic Church and Cemetery	St. Colman's Roman Catholic Church and Cemetery	August 23, 1984 (#84003658)	County Route 26; 37°45′57″N 80°55′16″W	Dillon	
8	Thurmond Historic District	Thurmond Historic District	January 27, 1984 (#84003520)	County Route 25/2 at New River; 37°57′29″N 81°04′40″W	Thurmond	
9	Trump-Lilly Farmstead	Trump-Lilly Farmstead	November 8, 1990 (#90001640)	County Route 26/3, 2.5 miles from County Route 26; 37°41′54″N 80°54′01″W	Hinton	Extends into Summers County

== See also ==
- National Register of Historic Places listings in Fayette County, West Virginia
- National Register of Historic Places listings in Raleigh County, West Virginia
