= John J. Beckley =

American politician (1757–1807)

Librarian of Congress
- In office January 29, 1802 – April 8, 1807
- President: Thomas Jefferson
- Preceded by: Position established
- Succeeded by: Patrick Magruder

Clerk of the United States House of Representatives
- In office December 7, 1801 – April 8, 1807
- Speaker: Nathaniel Macon
- Preceded by: John H. Oswald
- Succeeded by: Patrick Magruder
- In office April 1, 1789 – May 14, 1797
- Speaker: Frederick Muhlenberg Jonathan Trumbull Jr. Frederick Muhlenberg Jonathan Dayton
- Preceded by: Position established
- Succeeded by: Jonathan Condy

Mayor of Richmond, Virginia
- In office July 1, 1783 – July 6, 1784
- Preceded by: William Foushee, Sr.
- Succeeded by: Robert Mitchell
- In office February 22, 1788 – March 9, 1789
- Preceded by: Richard Adams
- Succeeded by: Alexander McRobert

Personal details
- Born: John James Beckley; August 4, 1757 near London, England, UK
- Died: April 8, 1807 (aged 49) Washington, D.C., U.S.
- Party: Democratic-Republican

John James Beckley (August 4, 1757 – April 8, 1807) was an American politician who served as the first and fourth clerk of the United States House of Representatives and the first librarian of Congress. Prior to this, he served as the mayor of Richmond, Virginia, in 1783–1784 and 1788–1789.

Born to a family in or around London that fell into poverty during the late 1760s, Beckley was sent by his family to the Colony of Virginia as an indentured servant, serving under the botanist and court official John Clayton. He became prolific in scribal and clerkship duties, and was hired by the clerk of Henrico County after Clayton's death. He was then appointed as the clerk of the county's Committee of Safety in 1775 and served as an assistant clerk for various state bodies. He followed Virginia's government as it moved from Williamsburg to Richmond, and then to the western portion of the state when it was evacuated due to the American Revolutionary War.

After the war, Beckley was elected mayor of Richmond, Virginia. He failed to become the secretary of the Constitutional Convention, but was secretary of the Virginia Ratifying Convention. He was elected the first Clerk of the House of Representatives after receiving endorsements from Edmund Randolph and James Madison. Seen as a competent and diligent clerk, he sought to maintain impartiality but secretly passed political intelligence to his Democratic-Republican allies. Infuriated by the Jay Treaty due to his support for the French Revolution, he became increasingly open in his politics. Strongly supportive of political campaigning (unlike his classical republican allies), he managed Thomas Jefferson's campaign in Pennsylvania during the 1796 presidential election. Jefferson lost the election to John Adams, and Beckley was replaced as clerk.

Unemployed and in dire financial straits, in part due to vast land holdings in the Appalachians that he was unable to sell, Beckley returned to practicing law. Seeking revenge against the Federalist Party leader Alexander Hamilton (who he saw as behind his ousting), he leaked his confession to an extramarital affair in 1797, initiating a scandal and disrupting Hamilton's career. With the income from municipal clerkship positions he was appointed to in Philadelphia, he campaigned vigorously for Jefferson in the 1800 presidential election, which saw Jefferson's victory over Adams. Jefferson restored his position as clerk and made him the inaugural Librarian of Congress. Beckley oversaw the library's early acquisitions and encouraged authors to send copies of their work to the institution. He died in office and was succeeded in both his clerkship and librarian positions by Patrick Magruder. Beckley's son Alfred secured his land holdings after a 28-year legal dispute; on this land, he founded the town of Beckley, West Virginia, named for his father.

== Early life ==
John James Beckley was said to have been born to John and Mary Beckley (née Bickley) in or around London on August 4, 1757. (Note: This date comes from the memoirs of Beckley's son, Alfred Beckley, written when he was around 80 years old. Known inaccuracies with Alfred Beckley's accounts cast some doubt on the authenticity of details such as Beckley's birth date or the family's origin in Exeter.) Little is known of his early life, family, or education. He had at least two siblings, both of whom later immigrated to the Thirteen Colonies. His family, possibly hailing from Exeter, had been in a relatively well-to-do position, but fell into poverty during the late 1760s.

Around the end of 1768, Virginian court official and botanist John Clayton requested that the London-based John Norton & Sons mercantile firm send him a young boy to serve as a scribe in his duties as the clerk of Gloucester County, Virginia. Clayton had served as clerk for almost fifty years, but required a scribe as his own writing abilities were declining from old age and failing eyesight. James Withers, a longtime employee of the firm, sent over his 11-year old nephew Beckley, whom his parents sold as an indentured servant. Norton, writing to a relative in Virginia, described Beckley as having good writing abilities and an understanding of arithmetic. Beckley departed from England aboard the Brilliant in March 1769, arriving at the York River of Virginia in mid-May. He was delivered to Clayton's home in Gloucester Courthouse by fleet manager Ephraim Goosley.

Clayton reported favorably to Norton of the "clever, lively boy", writing that he was very skilled in arithmetic and well-behaved, noting that he "eats & drinks at my table with me like family". Beckley worked diligently as a scribe at the courthouse, with Clayton sternly supervising and ensuring that Beckley improved his handwriting. He slowly took on more of Clayton's roles, performing most of his master's duties by his teenage years. Beckley witnessed Clayton's will in late October 1773, and Clayton died on December 23. Shortly afterwards, Beckley was hired by Thomas Adams, the clerk of Henrico County, Virginia.

== Early political career ==
By 1775, the authority of the royal government was collapsing in the colony. In February 1775, a 17-year old Beckley was appointed as the clerk of the Committee of Safety (a local committee of Patriot revolutionaries) for Henrico County. He was reelected to the position by a meeting of freeholders that November. On August 24, 1775, a general Committee of Safety over the whole of the Colony of Virginia was established at its capital city of Williamsburg, with Edmund Pendleton serving as president. Beckley began assisting the Virginia committee's clerk soon afterwards, and was officially appointed assistant clerk on February 7, 1776.

=== State government ===
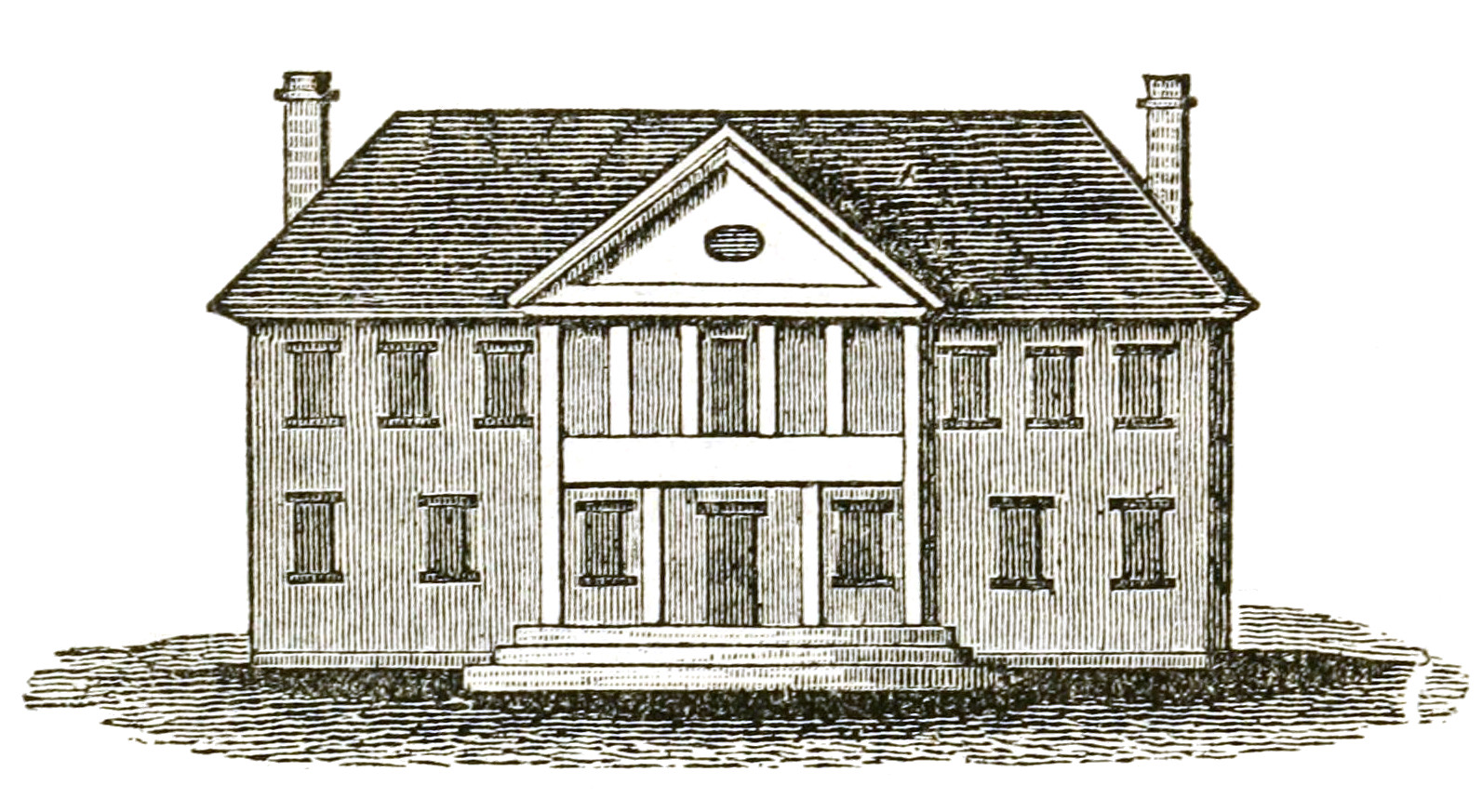
Sketch of Virginia's second Williamsburg Capitol

Beckley became the assistant clerk of the Council of Virginia on December 23, 1776, and was reelected in July 1777. He replaced John Pendleton Jr. as Clerk of the Virginia Senate by November. He began studying law, possibly utilizing Clayton's library and likely studying in Williamsburg alongside attorney general Edmund Randolph. In June 1779, Randolph was elected to the Continental Congress, and Beckley succeeded him as clerk of the Virginia House of Delegates. He was also appointed clerk of the High Court of Chancery (a position he held until 1785), the state's Court of Appeals, and took over the operations of Randolph's law firm. Around this time, Beckley's sister Mary Anne arrived from England and moved in with John. She later married one of Beckley's clerks.

In the early spring of 1780, the Virginia government moved from Williamsburg to Richmond. Beckley rented a house in the town and purchased several slaves. He also began to practice law, participate in city government, and established a chapter of the honor society Phi Beta Kappa in the city. In January 1781, Beckley and the General Assembly evacuated from the city due to the threat of General Benedict Arnold's forces in the region. The assembly soon returned, but evacuated again due to General Charles Cornwallis's Virginia campaign. The assembly briefly relocated to Charlottesville before its relocation to Staunton. In Staunton, Beckley visited portions of western Virginia including Warm Springs. Impressed by the region's settlement potential, he became involved in land speculation there alongside assemblyman George Clendenin.

By the early 1780s, Beckley worked alongside prominent Virginian politician Thomas Jefferson. He helped Jefferson evacuate state records to Jefferson's Monticello plantation during British military campaigns in the region. In March 1781, he likely acted as a press liaison for Jefferson, giving The Virginia Gazette a written exchange between Jefferson and General George Washington.

=== Postwar period ===
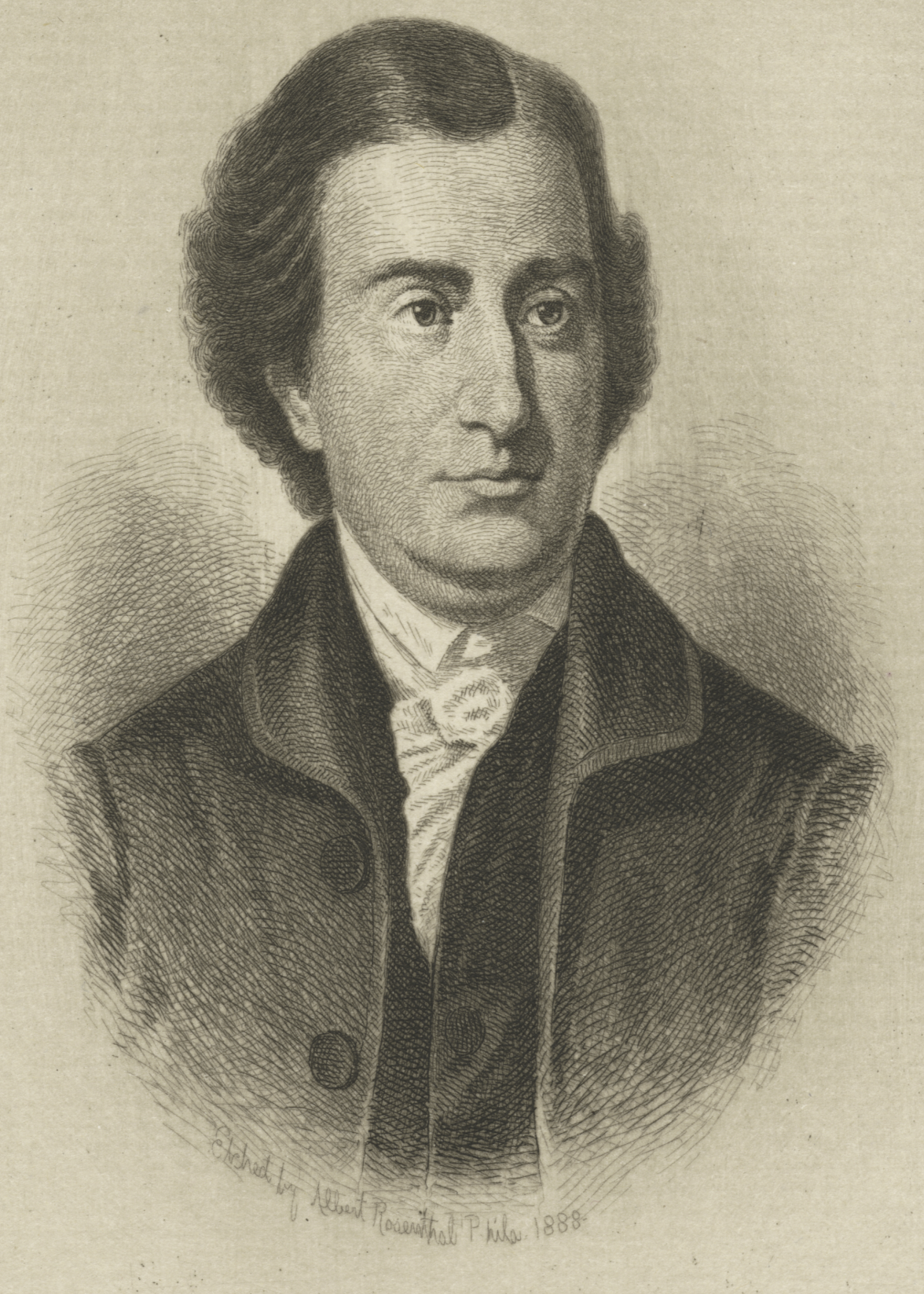
Beckley frequently worked alongside Edmund Randolph over the course of their political careers.

Beckley returned with the assembly to Richmond in late November 1781. In May 1782, Richmond was incorporated as a city. Beckley purchased a house in Richmond shortly afterwards, seeking to participate in the city elections. On July 2, 1782, the city's roughly 800 freeholders elected Beckley as one of Henrico County's twelve council members. The day after his election as councilor, Beckley was elected by the council as one of its four aldermen. In this role, he drafted meeting procedures, police regulations, and methods to record the city's vital statistics. He was elected as the city's second mayor in July 1783, at the age of 26.

Beckley continued to serve in city government over the next six years, alternating between positions as a councilman, an alderman, and the mayor. (Note: Beckley served as Mayor of Richmond from July 1, 1783, to July 6, 1784, and then again from February 21, 1788, to March 9, 1789.) As mayor, he oversaw street repairs and the construction of a local jail. Although he was successful in politics due to his clerical abilities, he was unable to fully enter the social circles of the Virginian elite because of his background as an indentured servant. He attempted to attain a higher status through land speculation and other investments. By 1783, Beckley owned eight slaves.

In 1787, Beckley traveled to the Constitutional Convention in Philadelphia with the hope to be elected as the secretary of the convention, staying with James Madison and Randolph at the home of Eliza House Trust. Madison felt that Beckley was unlikely to be elected secretary, writing to Randolph a month before the convention:

If Mr. Beckley has no other view in coming to Philada. [Philadelphia] than that of the secretaryship of the convention, I suspect the chance of his success ought hardly to recommend the trip. Other solicitations will certainly oppose him, backed by services in a more conspicuous, & in the common opinion, more meritorious.

— James Madison, letter to Edmund Randolph, April 11, 1787

Beckley spent several weeks meeting with officials at the convention, attempting to curry favor, with such a frequent presence that some mistook him as a delegate. Beckley was unable to convince the Virginia delegates to nominate him for secretaryship; the position instead went to William Jackson. He left the convention early, and made plans to serve as a delegate to the Virginia Ratifying Convention in Richmond, where the constitution produced by the Philadelphia convention would be ratified. Unlikely to be elected as a delegate for the Richmond due to political competition, he instead ran as a delegate for Greenbrier County, a remote Appalachian county where he had significant land investments. He traveled to Greenbrier in March 1788, where he lost the election to two locals who had previously served as his surveyors. He was instead able to secure a position as the convention's secretary. Fifteen copies of Virginia's ratification were produced by Beckley and delivered to the other states and Congress. After the convention, he served as the mayor of Richmond from 1788 until his resignation on March 9, 1789.

Beckley delivered Virginia's votes to New York City (then the capital city) after the 1788–89 presidential election. Still serving as the clerk of the House of Delegates, Beckley was faced with a proposed set of reforms which would reduce his wages. Such a pay cut threatened to disrupt his finances, which were already limited by an obligation to send money to his elderly parents in England. Seeking a higher-paying position, he attempted to secure the post of clerk of the newly-formed United States House of Representatives. He solicited endorsements for the position while staying with Madison in a house on Maiden Lane in New York. Madison and Randolph both advocated for Beckley's appointment. In a letter of recommendation to Caleb Strong, Randolph described Beckley as a good friend and "inferior to no man in America in all of the duties of a clerk and draughtsman." Beckley additionally gained the support of Virginia's large congressional delegation. After a tied first round, Beckley was elected clerk on April 1, 1789, narrowly defeating William S. Stockton of New Jersey.

== First congressional clerkship ==
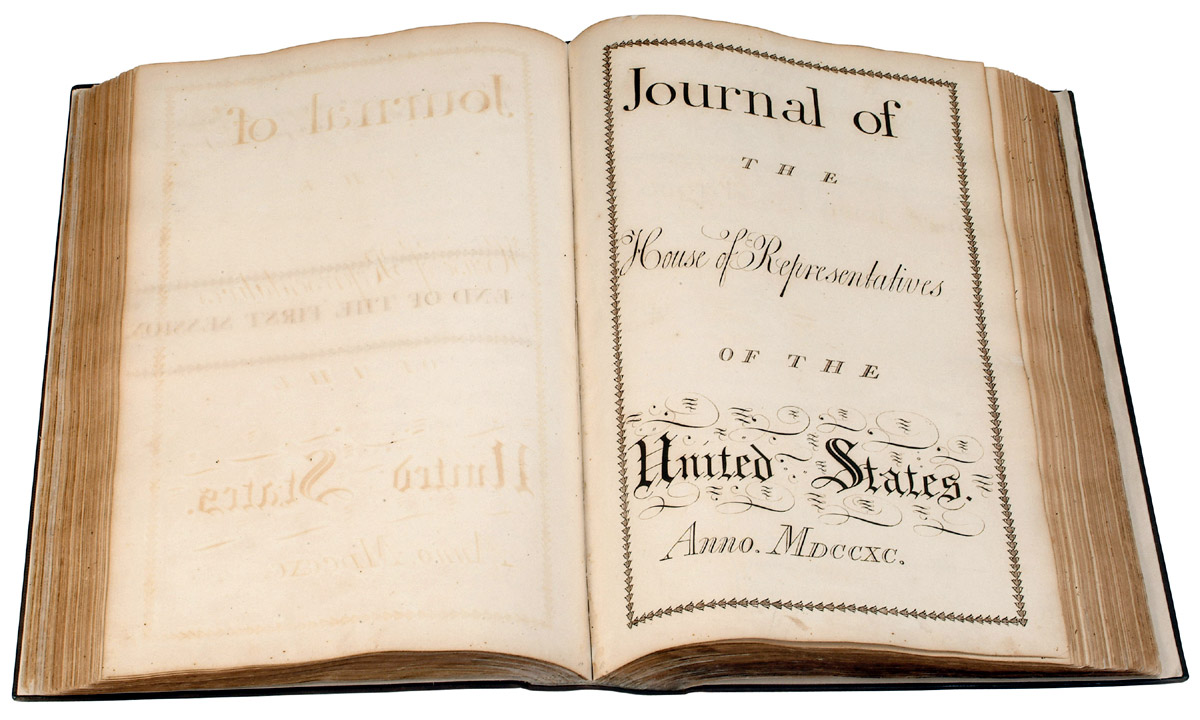
The United States House Journal for the 1st Congress, the printing and distribution of which was supervised by Beckley

Beckley took up a variety of administrative tasks in his role as House Clerk. He initiated roll calls, read bills and motions, applied the Seal of the House to official documents of the body, and certified the passage of bills and resolutions. He was also responsible for printing the House Journal and its distribution to the President, house members, and the state legislatures. During the 2nd Congress, he was allotted funds to hire three assistant clerks. He was seen as a competent and efficient clerk, with congressman John Page writing in 1797 that "there never was a more correct & diligent clerk". While in New York, Beckley became closely tied to the city's elite class, freed from the stigma of his background as a servant. Although he began making friends with some members of Congress, his relations and correspondence with Jefferson and Madison, his fellow Virginians, remained limited to political matters.

Through his duties, Beckley gathered political intelligence for his Jeffersonian political allies, regularly passing on information to Jefferson, Madison, and James Monroe. His position allowed him opportunities to eavesdrop on conversations, and his clerkship duties gave him the chance to survey the documents circulating through the house. After Congress's relocation to Philadelphia in 1790, Beckley made regular visits to New York City, gathering political intelligence. He wrote various anonymous articles and pamphlets, including editorials in a prominent anti-Federalist newspaper, the Philadelphia-based Aurora General Advertiser, and leaked sensitive information on Federalist leaders. In 1793, he supplied Jefferson with information on congressmen's financial interests, listing those who were confirmed or suspected to be stockholders or directors of banks.

Although Beckley initially sought to maintain appearances of impartiality and nonpartisanship in his official duties as clerk, this gradually became untenable. In 1792, he campaigned for George Clinton to replace John Adams as vice president. Due to his support for the revolutionary French government, he was staunchly opposed to the Jay Treaty with Great Britain. Beckley rallied Jeffersonian opposition to the treaty, but it narrowly passed in the House by a margin of 51 to 48 in 1796. He became increasingly open in his partisanship following this loss. As Jefferson and Madison had returned to private life, Beckley became one of a small group of activists leading the emerging Democratic-Republican Party. Jefferson thought that activists such as Beckley and Benjamin Bache were unsuited to lead the opposition but was unsuccessful in convincing Madison to head the campaign against the treaty. Beckley and his party were incensed after President Washington signed the treaty and accused Randolph, who had campaigned against it, of accepting bribes; he was convinced that Washington had become overly sympathetic to the British and rallied against him, accusing Treasury Secretary Oliver Wolcott Jr. of overpaying the president's salary.

=== 1796 election ===
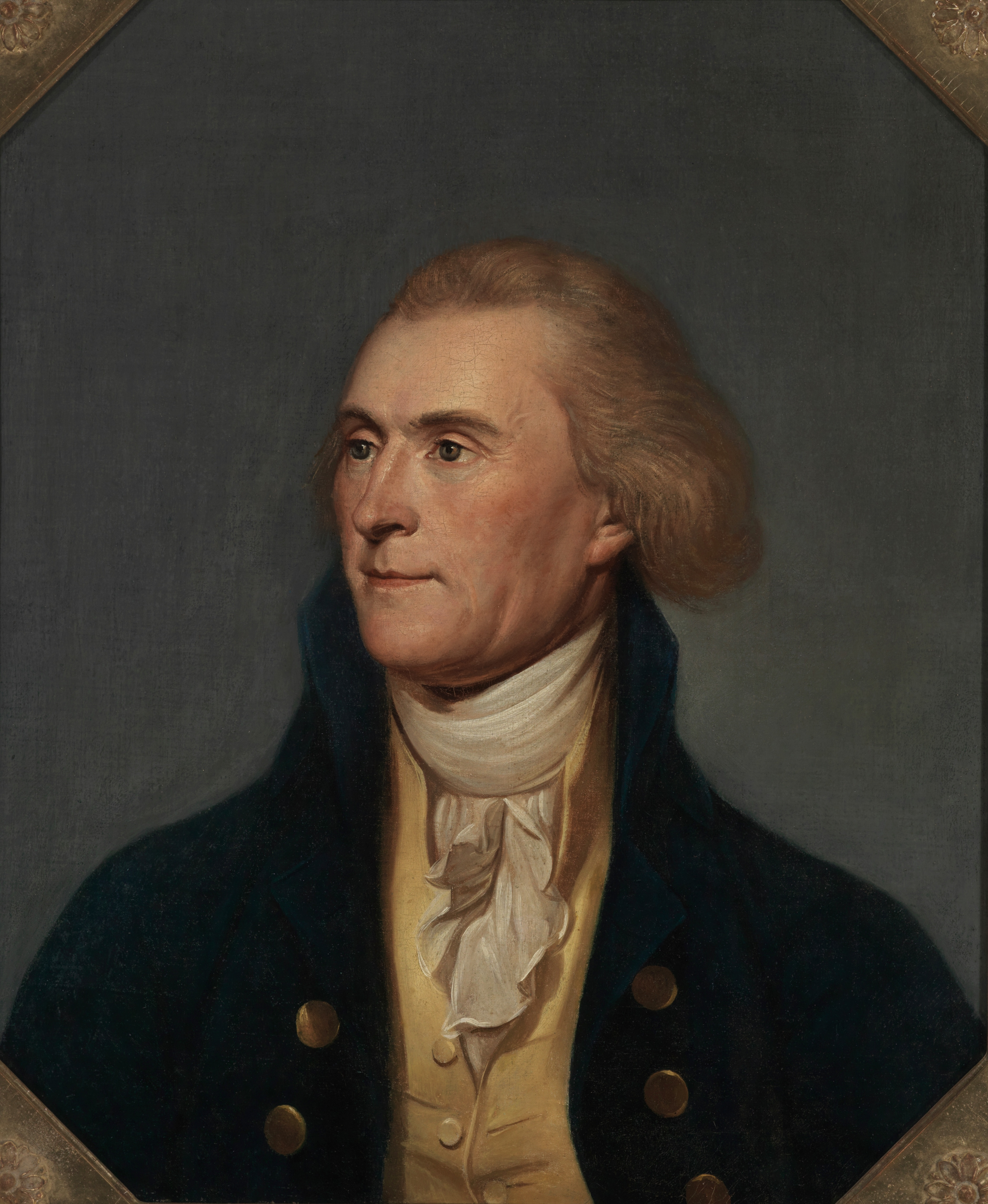
Beckley managed Thomas Jefferson's 1796 presidential campaign in Pennsylvania, ensuring him the vice presidency.

Beckley became further involved in electioneering during the 1796 United States presidential election, the first competitive presidential election, which saw bitter campaigning between the Democratic-Republican Jefferson and Federalist Adams. Beckley managed Jefferson's campaign in Pennsylvania, a key swing state. Following the announcement of Washington's retirement, Beckley contacted influential officials in Pennsylvania to seek their assistance in the Democratic-Republican campaign. He sent statesman William Irvine a list of the state's electors and asked for him to "scatter a few copies thro' some proper hands." As with the debate over the Jay Treaty, Jefferson and Madison largely avoided campaigning, while Beckley was so invested in the campaign that historian Jeffrey Pasley wrote that he had engaged in "more strenuous electioneering than any American ever had". He tapped prominent local politicians to run as electors or campaign for Jefferson, and distributed 50,000 party tickets and leaflets for the campaign. As printed ballots were outlawed, Beckley and a group of family and employees produced a massive volume of handwritten party tickets. Working with a system of agents sent out from Philadelphia, Beckley wrote handbills that rallied against the Federalists, accusing them of being elitists.

Thanks in part to Beckley's campaigning, Jefferson narrowly won Pennsylvania in 1796. Although behind Adams in electoral votes, Jefferson's victory in Pennsylvania ensured that he became vice president instead of Thomas Pinckney. Due to Beckley's intense partisanship, he was opposed by the Federalist-majority House of the 5th Congress and by the strongly Federalist cabinet. Although Adams was not expected to call Congress into session until the end of the year, he abruptly called a session for May 15. Beckley did not suspect that he would be replaced; he had won previous reelections by large margins. Up to 14 Democratic-Republicans were absent, and the Federalist congressmen nominated Jonathan Williams Condy for the clerkship; Condy was elected clerk by a margin of 41 to 40. Three days later, Jefferson wrote to Madison in disappointment regarding the "loss of the ablest clerk in the US".

== Career under the Federalists ==
Beckley blamed Alexander Hamilton for his career setbacks and leaked records of his extramarital affair to James T. Callender.

After losing his position as the clerk of the House, Beckley returned to practicing law. He was in a desperate financial situation; his parents and siblings were financially dependent on him, and most of his savings were tied up in backcountry land which he had great difficulties selling. He had previously endorsed notes for his friends and relatives, and came under serious threat of debtors' prison. He was forced to borrow money from allies such as Jefferson and Benjamin Rush. Meanwhile, Federalist newspapers frequently mocked him. The journalist William Cobbett attacked Beckley in his paper, writing that he was voted out due to misconduct as clerk rather than political pressures. This enraged Beckley, who entered Cobbett's office with evidence against the charge and demanded that he be allowed to print a reply in the paper. After Cobbett offered to print the reply the following day, stating that there was more important business in the current day's paper, Beckley threatened to whip him, but withdrew after Cobbett challenged him to a duel in the streets.

Beckley believed that Federalist leader Alexander Hamilton had masterminded the disruption of his, Randolph's, and Monroe's careers. Out of a desire for revenge on Hamilton, Beckley leaked records to the journalist James T. Callender of Hamilton's extramarital affair. Callender published them as a supplement to his book History of the United States for 1796, released in June 1797, sparking mass scandal. Hamilton did not believe that Beckley had acted independently, and accused Monroe of having directed the release of the papers; the matter almost came to a duel which was narrowly prevented by Aaron Burr. The affair greatly damaged Hamilton's political standing, especially regarding any potential presidential campaign.

Beckley struggled over the following years, making a scant living from his legal work and attempting to regain his former post as clerk of the House. After Thomas McKean's victory in the 1799 Pennsylvania gubernatorial election, Beckley aimed for an appointment within the Philadelphia city government, seeing it as a way to gain financial support and return to political campaigning. McKean appointed him as clerk of both the Philadelphia mayor's court and the Orphans' Court of Philadelphia County (replacing McKean's nephew Joseph Hopkinson), providing a salary roughly equivalent to that of his former congressional clerkship.

By 1800, Beckley and the journalist William Duane succeeded Bache as editor of the Philadelphia Aurora. They were approached by Philadelphia sheriff Israel Israel, who received evidence that Treasury Secretary Wolcott had misused public funds. John Adams had fired the prominent Hamiltonians James McHenry and Timothy Pickering from his cabinet, leaving Wolcott as a convenient target for political attacks. Beckley assisted Duane in pestering Wolcott about funds owed to the government, and other papers picked up the story alongside their own commentary. Wolcott was pressured to resign, taking effect at the end of the year.

=== 1800 election ===
Beckley was unremitting in his campaign work leading up to the presidential election of 1800. Alongside activists such as Tench Coxe and Mathew Carey, he worked to ensure a wide distribution of Democratic-Republican propaganda and grassroots party organization. Beckley wrote several pamphlets and political tracts which saw wide distribution. These included a republished essay criticizing Federalist attempts to create a standing army, and a 32-page tract titled Address to the Citizens of the United States (under the pen name Americanus) which defended Jefferson against Federalist criticism and included the first published Jefferson biography. Beckley obtained a leaked pamphlet written by Hamilton which promoted Charles Cotesworth Pinckney and strongly condemned Adams; he arranged with Duane for this to be published in the Aurora. Adams and his supporters were greatly angered, further damaging Hamilton's political standing.

Jefferson and Madison did not publicly campaign for the election, mainly directing others to campaign for them. Although Beckley was initially confident that the Democratic-Republicans would secure all 15 of Pennsylvania's electoral votes, an uncooperative state senate led to only eight going to Jefferson. The national election resulted in a 73 to 73 tie between Jefferson and his running mate Burr, forcing a contingent election to be held in February 1801. After a week of voting, Jefferson was elected on the 36th ballot, resulting in widespread celebration among Democratic-Republicans across the country. Despite disagreement among upper-class members of the party, Beckley was selected to lead celebrations in Philadelphia for Jefferson's inauguration. He led a march through the city and delivered its keynote address.

Many Democratic-Republicans expected political appointments; few had served in public office under the Washington and Adams administrations. Jefferson received many requests and recommendations for appointees, but initially only made appointments to fill vacancies. The party's political pressure on the president grew, leading Jefferson to seek to remove controversial Federalists from office to balance the two parties' representation in government. Beckley made recommendations for his friends and colleagues, extolling the most dedicated Democratic-Republican organizers and activists. This put him in contrast to many classical republicans, who saw learned gentrymen materially independent of politics as the ideal public officials. He did not submit an application for himself. Both Monroe and Pennsylvania governor McKean wrote to Jefferson about Beckley, but he was unable to offer him an immediate appointment.

== Second congressional clerkship ==
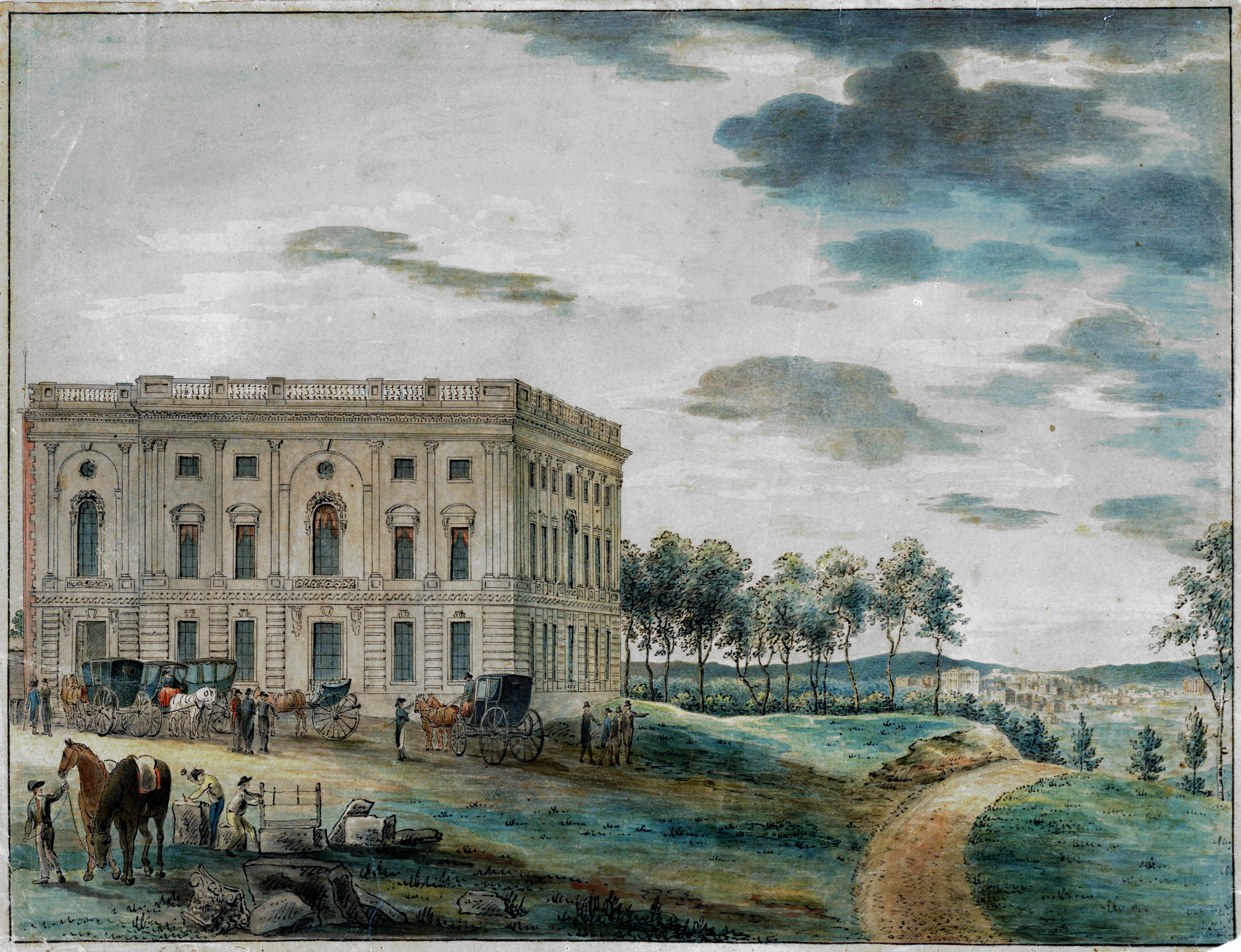
Congress assembling in the newly built United States Capitol in 1800

Beckley was involved with local politics in Philadelphia for much of 1801, as Jefferson considered Beckley unfitting for the highest postings. He considered appointing Beckley as Comptroller of the Treasury, but chose Gabriel Duvall instead. In October, Jefferson wrote to Beckley that he expected he would be reelected as Clerk of the House of Representatives and made a recommendation for an engrossing clerk. Samuel Allyne Otis grew concerned that Beckley was intending to replace him as Secretary of the Senate, but this did not materialize. Beckley was elected as clerk on December 7, 1801, replacing Condy's successor John Holt Oswald. Beckley and his family moved to the newly built capital of Washington, D.C., where they initially stayed at the home of French ambassador Louis-André Pichon. Suffering from gout and leg ulcers, Beckley was temporarily restricted to crutches.

Beckley lacked influence in the Jefferson administration, writing to Coxe that he was "not a Cabinet Minister, nor do I know anything of their interior movements". The workload of the House Clerk was heavier than that of the Secretary of the Senate, leading many to continue to suspect that Beckley was seeking to claim Otis's position. Alongside his work as clerk and librarian, Beckley became involved in the municipal politics of Washington. He was elected to the second chamber of the Washington city council in June 1805, and later became the body's president pro tempore.

=== Librarian of Congress ===
The establishment of a Library of Congress had been a perennial proposal since the early 1780s. The presence of the expansive Library Company of Philadelphia and New York Society Library had rendered such an institution somewhat redundant during Congress's stay in the two cities. However, no libraries existed in Washington, D.C., upon the move to the city in 1800. In legislation related to the move of the capital, Congress was allotted funds to purchase books, but did not refer to the collection of books as a library, likely due to resistance against a government-funded library after a 1790 proposal. Congress only held 243 of its own books, which were managed by the Secretary of the Senate and the House Clerk. Debates on a bill regulating the use of the books began in December 1801. House and Senate versions of the legislation differed; the Senate bill included an annual appropriation and limited use of the library to members of Congress, while the House bill had no such appropriation and extended use privileges to officials such as Supreme Court justices and members of the cabinet. The compromise bill, passed in January 1802, provided a one-time appropriation of five thousand dollars to establish the library, limiting access to members of Congress, the President, and the Vice President. It was established within a large room inside the Capitol; this room was initially occupied by the House, but had gone unused after the House moved chambers. A joint committee was established to direct the library.

The bill also arranged for a librarian of Congress to manage the operations of the library. The salary offered was not particularly high, but the position received a number of applicants, mainly lawyers and clerks. After Beckley asked Madison and attorney general Levi Lincoln Sr. for the position, Jefferson appointed him as the first librarian of Congress on January 29, 1802. This added significantly to Beckley's already-busy workload for only a modest amount of pay. That April, Beckley produced a catalogue of the library's holdings—964 volumes, alongside 9 maps and charts. Two months later, after documenting how much of the library's appropriation had been spent, Beckley wrote to Jefferson, a strong supporter of the library, and suggested titles to purchase. Jefferson replied and notified that the purchase of 700 additional volumes had been approved by the committee.

Beckley's health declined in the summer of 1802, and he spent much of the congressional recess at Berkeley Springs (now in West Virginia) to recuperate, returning home in much better condition. He wrote to Rush to encourage him to send copies of his completed works to the library, establishing what would become a common practice with the library. Issues with financial records were common. In one instance, Jefferson ordered books from a bookseller in Paris and included a separate order for a personal encyclopedia. The two orders had been bundled into one purchase and further conflated by an order of wine made by Jefferson, so the library had been charged for the shipping and handling of the whole lot. Jefferson wrote a check to Beckley to resolve this issue. Another debacle emerged in December 1805, after Beckley fired Josiah King, a house clerk who had been initially hired by Condy. King accused Beckley of hiring him as an assistant librarian and then failing to pay him. A house committee investigating the matter found no proof to support King's charges.

In 1805, the House moved back to the room which had since been occupied by the library, so the library was forced to move to a provided committee room. In addition to poor maintenance and a leaky roof, the room was cramped and struggled to accommodate the library's growing collections. Despite these smaller quarters, the library continued to make acquisitions. A congressional committee headed by professor-turned-politician Samuel L. Mitchill recommended that the library acquire more maps and books on history and politics. The Senate passed an appropriation of $1,000 per year to fund this expansion; this bill also allowed other senior officials such as cabinet members to use the library, and authorized the purchase of books published within the United States.

Beckley served as Clerk of the House of Representatives and Librarian of Congress until his death on April 8, 1807. He was succeeded in both positions by Patrick Magruder, a Democratic-Republican official from Maryland who had previously served a term as a member of the House.

== Works and views ==
Beckley assisted in the creation of Jefferson's 1801 Manual of Parliamentary Practice. In 1798, he reviewed and annotated Jefferson's notes on parliamentary procedure, and sent him excerpts from his 1791 work entitled Books of Minutes on Parliamentary Proceedings. Beckley wrote political tracts, editorials, and essays under pen names such as "Americanus", "Senex", or "A Calm Observer". He wrote for papers such as the Philadelphia Aurora, National Gazette and the New York Greenleaf's New Daily Advertiser.

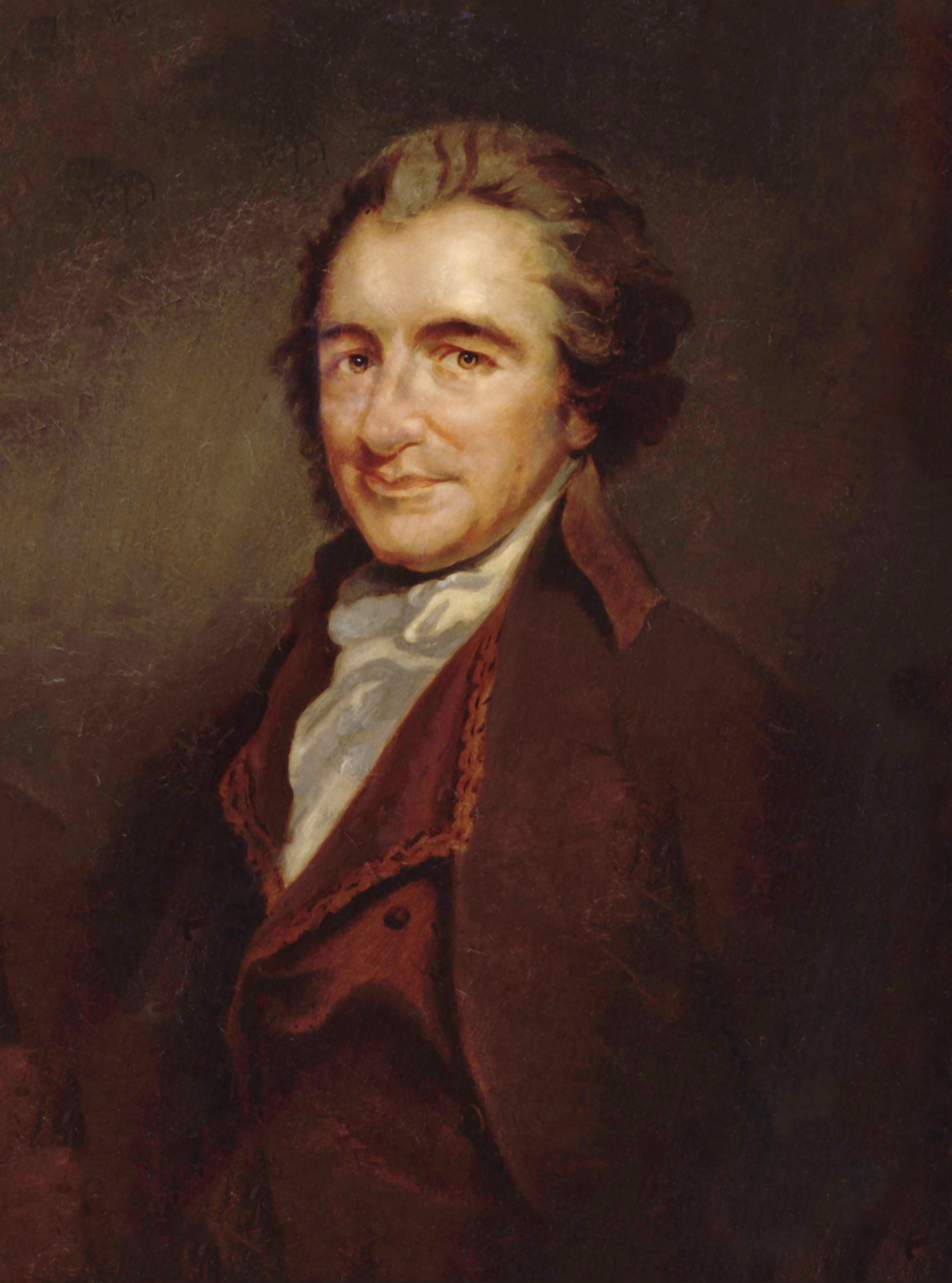
Thomas Paine formed a major influence on Beckley's thought.

Like Jefferson and Madison, Beckley was generally aligned with classical republicanism. His policy and rhetoric generally mirrored that of the two founding fathers, although in Philadelphia and New York he was influenced by Thomas Paine's writings and urban American intellectuals such as Coxe. Beckley was more critical of the agrarian outlook of prominent Virginia republicans, seeing urban citizens as equally virtuous as yeoman farmers. He was supportive of organized political campaigning, a practice often shunned by classical republicans in the south. He was sharply critical of the Federalists and "gentleman-officeholders", and saw them as seeking to supplant themselves as the new ruling class through titles and a lack of humility. Beckley saw suffrage and participation within the electoral process as the most important activity in protecting the republic, praising the "inestimable right of suffrage" as the "first constitutional privilege, panacea, of freemen, the peaceful exercise of which has induced blessings so momentous".

Beckley was an enthusiastic supporter of democratic revolution, extolling the French Revolution and advocating for "cordial union and good understanding" between France and the United States. He was one of the first Americans to obtain a copy of Paine's Rights of Man, a defense of the French Revolution, and arranged for its domestic printing. Beckley lent his copy to Jefferson in April 1791, and asked him to forward it to Samuel Harrison Smith when he finished. This created a significant scandal between Jefferson and Adams, as Smith had included a note from Jefferson praising the book for its attack on "political heresy" in his republication of the work.

== Personal life ==
On April 10, 1779, Beckley was elected as the 32nd member of the Phi Beta Kappa society at the College of William & Mary, following a rule change which allowed non-students such as Beckley to join. Through the society, Beckley became friends with John Brown and John Page, with whom he would design the society's seal. Less than a month after joining, he was elected as the society's clerk. Beckley wrote the charters of its first two branch chapters, Harvard and Yale. He was also elected to the Williamsburg Lodge of Freemasons in 1779. In June 1791, he was elected to the American Philosophical Society. His former master Clayton had been one of its earliest members. Beckley was a hobbyist calligrapher and presented two samples of his writing to the society.

During his early political career in postwar Virginia, Beckley frequently attempted to boost his wealth and prestige through investments. These include his acquisition of 49,000 acres (200 km^{2}) worth of land warrants in 1783, which he used to purchase extensive territory in Greenbrier County, now part of West Virginia. His land investments were rendered unprofitable after the collapse of the land speculation scheme of financiers Robert Morris and John Nicholson in 1797. His efforts to become affiliated with the Virginia gentry, whether through wealth or a favorable marriage, were ultimately unsuccessful. He spent much of his time in Richmond at various taverns, where he became drinking companions with future Supreme Court justice John Marshall.

Beckley married Maria Prince, the daughter of a New York merchant, on October 16, 1790. They had four children—three sons and one daughter—but only one, Alfred Beckley, survived to adulthood.

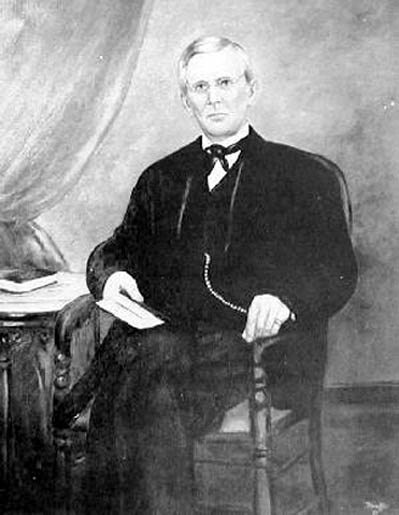
Beckley's son Alfred named the town of Beckley, West Virginia, for his father.

=== Death and legacy ===
Long in poor health, Beckley died in Washington, D.C., on April 8, 1807, and was buried at a public cemetery in Georgetown. His obituary was published in the National Intelligencer two days later.

A legal dispute emerged over his estate, resulting in a protracted lawsuit which would not take 28 years to resolve. His widow Maria and his son Alfred were left in an uncomfortable financial situation, worsened by outstanding debts to various colleagues who had lent him money to avoid debtors' prison, including Jefferson and Rush. Maria stayed with friends in Washington and Philadelphia, and later with the family of Kentucky congressman John Fowler. She died in Lexington in 1833. Alfred Beckley was admitted to West Point on recommendation from General William Henry Harrison, graduating in 1823. After serving in various military postings, he was able to secure his father's estate, including a very large tract of unsettled land in western Virginia. Alfred Beckley resigned from the army and built his homestead on this plot; this later emerged into the town of Beckley, Virginia, which he named for his father.

Beckley was an obscure figure to many later historians; he was not given an entry within the 1928–1936 Dictionary of American Biography. He has no surviving portrait; the only known painting of him was destroyed by fire. It was initially uncertain if the John James Beckley who became Clayton's scribe in 1769 was the same individual that later became the first librarian of Congress. Beginning in the late 1940s, a series of scholars published articles about him and his activities, highlighting his role within the early American political system and Jefferson's presidential campaigns. The scholars Edmund Berkeley and Dorothy Smith Berkeley published a biography entitled John Beckley: Zealous Partisan in a Nation Divided in 1973. In 1995, historian Gerard W. Gawalt published a volume of his collected works, Justifying Jefferson: The Political Writings of John James Beckley.

== Notes ==
=== Works cited ===
- Berkeley, Edmund; Berkeley, Dorothy (1962). "'The Ablest Clerk in the U.S.' John James Beckley". The Virginia Magazine of History and Biography. 70 (4): 434–446. JSTOR 4246892.
- Berkeley, Edmund; Berkeley, Dorothy Smith (1973). John Beckley: Zealous Partisan in a Nation Divided. American Philosophical Society. ISBN 9780871691002. OCLC 00771668.
- Berkeley, Edmund; Berkeley, Dorothy (1975). "The First Librarian of Congress: John Beckley". The Quarterly Journal of the Library of Congress. 32 (2): 83–117. JSTOR 29781617.
- Bickford, Charlene Bangs (1998). "John James Beckley". In Kneebone, John T. (ed.). Dictionary of Virginia Biography. Vol. 1. Library of Virginia. pp. 430–431. ISBN 9780884901891. OCLC 39700712.
- Boyd, Julian P., ed. (1982). The Papers of Thomas Jefferson. Vol. 20. Princeton University Press. doi:10.2307/j.ctv346p9k. ISBN 9780691185262. JSTOR j.ctv346p9k. OCLC 16353926.
- Cunningham, Noble E. (1956). "John Beckley: An Early American Party Manager". The William and Mary Quarterly. 13 (1): 40–52. doi:10.2307/1923388. JSTOR 1923388.
- Gawalt, Gerard W., ed. (1995). Justifying Jefferson: the Political Writings of John James Beckley. Library of Congress. ISBN 9780844408750. OCLC 32432324.
- Howell, Wilbur Samuel (1988). Jefferson's Parliamentary Writings: Parliamentary Pocket-Book and A Manual of Parliamentary Practice. Princeton University Press. ISBN 9781400858941. JSTOR j.ctt7ztg43. OCLC 16527971.
- Jahoda, Gloria (1960). "John Beckley: Jefferson's Campaign Manager". Bulletin of the New York Public Library. 64 (5): 247–260.
- Jenkins, Jeffery A.; Stewart, Charles III (2004). More than Just a Mouthpiece: The House Clerk as Party Operative, 1789-1870 (PDF). American Political Science Association. Chicago.
- Ostrowski, Carl (2004). Books, Maps, and Politics: A Cultural History of the Library of Congress, 1783–1861. Amherst: University of Massachusetts Press. ISBN 9781613761441. JSTOR j.ctt5vk55t. OCLC 794701556.
- Pasley, Jeffrey L. (1996). "'A Journeyman, Either in Law or Politics': John Beckley and the Social Origins of Political Campaigning". Journal of the Early Republic. 16 (4): 531–569. doi:10.2307/3124417. JSTOR 3124417.

Government offices
New office	Clerk of the United States House of Representatives; 1789–1797	Succeeded by Jonathan W. Condy
Preceded by John H. Oswald	Clerk of the United States House of Representatives; 1801–1807	Succeeded by Patrick Magruder
