= Beckley Mill Site =

- U.S. National Register of Historic Places
- Location within West Virginia Location within the United States
- Location: Worley Rd. at Piney Cr., Beckley, West Virginia
- Coordinates: 37°46′24″N 81°9′3″W
- Built: 1835
- Built by: Alfred Beckley
- NRHP reference No.: 100000947
- Added to NRHP: May 1, 2017

The Beckley Mill Site is a historic archaeological site off Worley Road near Piney Creek in Beckley, West Virginia. The site is that of a mill established in 1835 by Beckley's founder and namesake, Alfred Beckley. The mill remained in use into the early 20th century, but was eventually closed and abandoned. Its site was sheltered from vandalism by isolation caused by railroad tracks and a local landfill, but it has now been turned into a small public park.

The site was listed on the National Register of Historic Places in 2017.

== See also ==
- National Register of Historic Places listings in Raleigh County, West Virginia
