= Wright-Hunter Cemetery =

Cemetery in Beckley, West Virginia, US

- U.S. National Register of Historic Places
- Location within West Virginia Location within the United States
- Location: 101 Antonio Ave, Beckley, West Virginia 25801
- Coordinates: 37°45′54″N 81°10′19″W
- Built: 1851
- NRHP reference No.: 100010187
- Added to NRHP: 2024

The Wright-Hunter Cemetery is a historic family burial ground located in Beckley in Raleigh County, West Virginia, United States.

It was listed on the National Register of Historic Places in 2024.

== History ==
Established in the mid-19th century, it contains approximately 37 marked graves, with the earliest dated to 1851. The cemetery includes the graves of several generations of the Wright and Hunter families, early settlers and landowners in the region. It is significant for its association with the agricultural development of the area and for preserving the legacy of prominent local families. The cemetery remains an important cultural and historical site, reflecting 19th- and early 20th-century burial practices in rural southern West Virginia.

== See also ==
- National Register of Historic Places listings in Raleigh County, West Virginia
