= Sophia, West Virginia =

Sophia
- Town
- Sophia, West Virginia
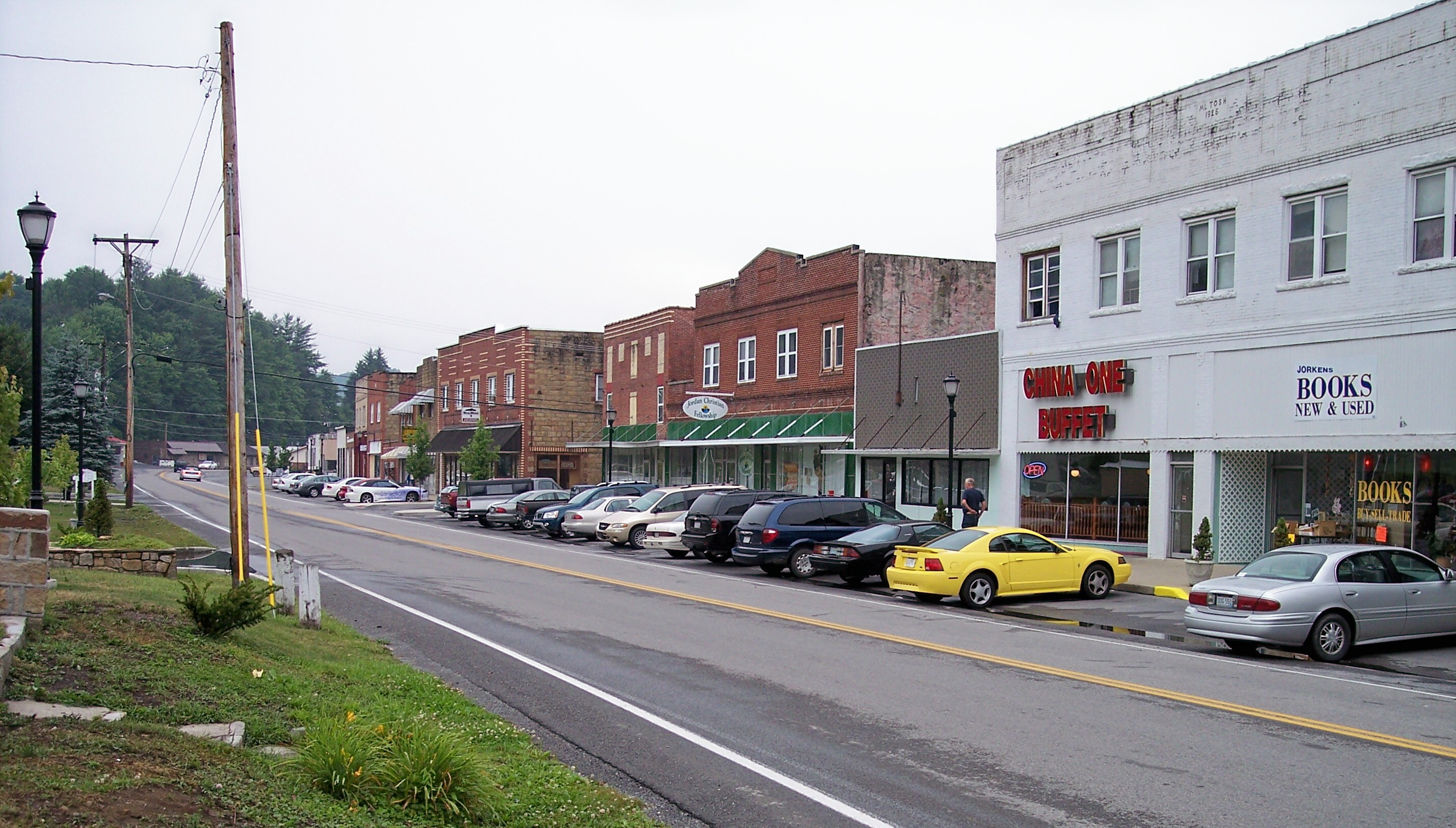
- Main st. (WV 16), downtown Sophia in 2007

- Logo

- Location of Sophia in Raleigh County, West Virginia.
- Coordinates: 37°42′29″N 81°15′12″W
- Country: United States
- State: West Virginia
- County: Raleigh
- Incorporated: 1912

Government
  - Type: City Council/Mayor
  - Mayor: Ralph Sallie

Area
  - Total: 0.70 sq mi (1.81 km^{2})
  - Land: 0.70 sq mi (1.81 km^{2})
  - Water: 0 sq mi (0.00 km^{2})
- Elevation: 2,326 ft (709 m)

Population (2020)
  - Total: 1,130
  - Estimate (2021): 1,107
  - Density: 1,763.1/sq mi (680.72/km^{2})
- Time zone: UTC-5 (Eastern (EST))
  - Summer (DST): UTC-4 (EDT)
- ZIP code: 25921
- Area code: 304
- FIPS code: 54-75172
- GNIS feature ID: 2391419
- Website: sophiawv.com

Sophia is a town in Raleigh County, West Virginia, United States. It was incorporated in 1912. The population was 1,124 at the 2020 census. Sophia is an incorporated municipality in Raleigh County. The town government is headquartered at Sophia Town Hall on East Railroad Avenue. The Raleigh County Public Library operates its Sophia Branch in the town. The branch has served the Sophia community since November 1974. Its historical commercial center, the Sophia Historical District is on the National Register of Historic Places.

== History ==
A post office called Sophia has been in operation since 1909. The town was named for Sophia McGinnis, the family member of a local civil servant. The town incorporated in 1912.

The area that became Sophia was originally known as Soak Creek. Pyrrhus McGinnis, who received a 2,500-acre land grant from the Commonwealth of Virginia, settled in the area with his family in 1843. Another early settler, Conrad Riffe, also settled along Soak Creek during the same period. The community was later named for Sophia, the third wife of McGinnis.

Development of the community accelerated with the expansion of the Virginian Railway into the region. Contractors constructing the railroad reached Soak Creek in 1908 and established an office and commissary there. In 1909, James I. Wilson, who operated the railroad commissary, sought a new name for the local post office. E. S. Brown suggested "Sophia" in honor of Sophia McGinnis, and the post office subsequently adopted the name.

The town was incorporated on August 30, 1912, with an original area of 302 acres. E. H. Ballard served as Sophia's first mayor, and the town had approximately 45 residents at the time of incorporation.

Sophia developed as a commercial center serving the surrounding Winding Gulf Coalfield. Although Sophia itself was not a company coal town such as nearby Affinity, residents of nearby coal camps traveled to the community for shopping and recreation. At one point, Sophia served as a trading center for as many as 24 surrounding coal mines.

Sophia experienced substantial growth during the first half of the 20th century as the surrounding coal industry expanded. A highway connecting the community with Beckley opened in 1925, improving access to the town, which previously depended heavily on rail transportation. The town's population increased from 240 in 1920 to 1,430 by 1950.

Several fires influenced the development of Sophia's commercial district. Major fires occurred in 1913, 1922, and 1925, with the 1922 fire destroying a significant portion of the town. In January 1925, the town council adopted an ordinance prohibiting the construction of wood-frame commercial buildings. Subsequent businesses were largely constructed of brick and locally quarried stone.

== Geography ==
According to the United States Census Bureau, the town has a total area of 0.69 square miles (1.79 km^{2}), all land.

== Transportation ==
Highways include State Route 16 and State Route 97.

== Demographics ==
Historical population
Census	Pop.	Note	%±
1920	240		—
1930	611		154.6%
1940	1,160		89.9%
1950	1,430		23.3%
1960	1,284		−10.2%
1970	1,303		1.5%
1980	1,216		−6.7%
1990	1,182		−2.8%
2000	1,301		10.1%
2010	1,344		3.3%
2020	1,130		−15.9%
2021 (est.)	1,107	▼	−2.0%
U.S. Decennial Census

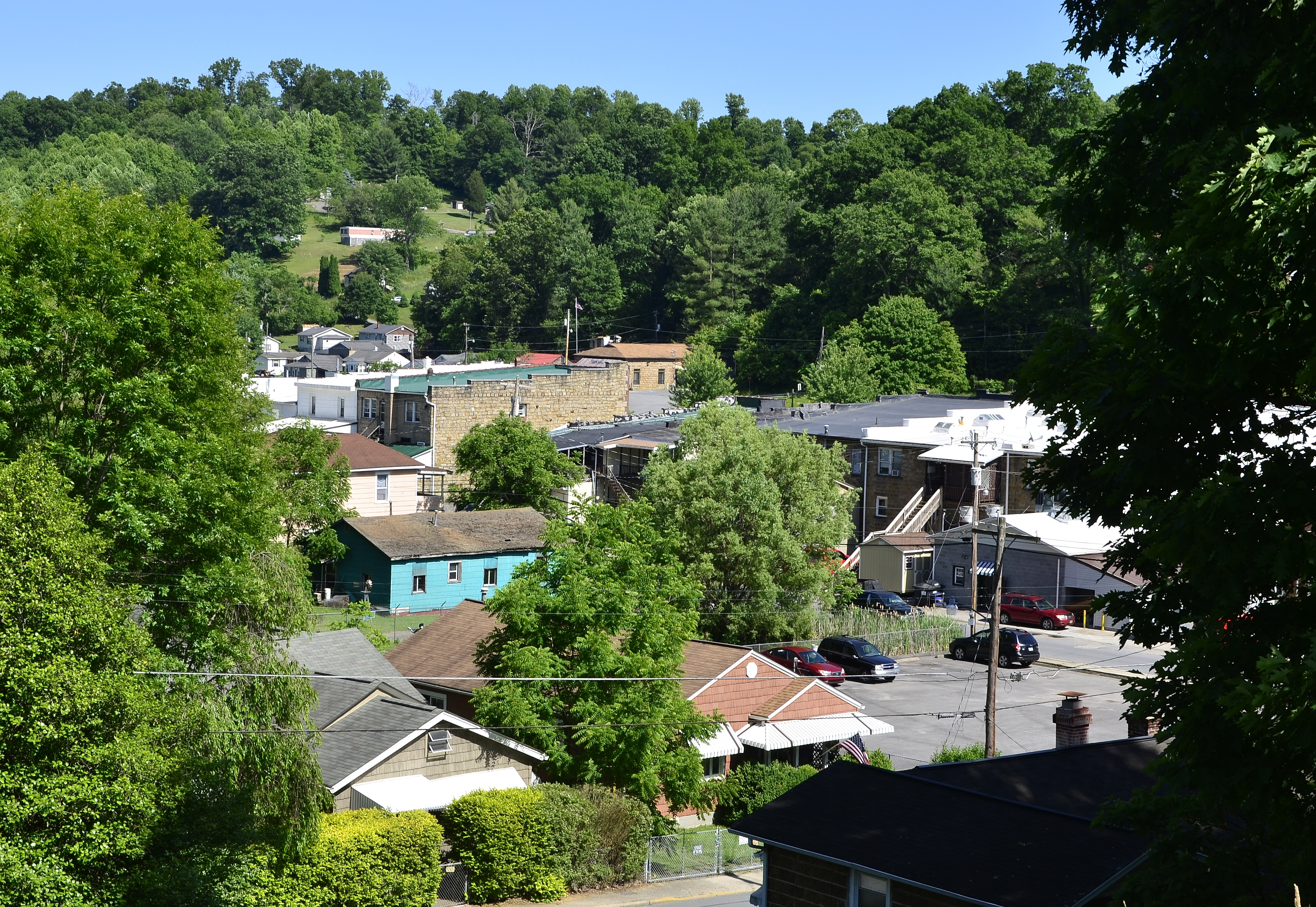
Hilltop view of homes in Sophia

=== 2010 census ===
At the 2010 census there were 1,344 people, 590 households, and 391 families living in the town. The population density was 1,947.8 inhabitants per square mile (752.0/km^{2}). There were 655 housing units at an average density of 949.3 per square mile (366.5/km^{2}). The racial makeup of the town was 97.2% White, 0.7% African American, 0.2% Native American, 0.7% Asian, 0.1% from other races, and 1.0% from two or more races. Hispanic or Latino of any race were 0.1%.

Of the 590 households 30.7% had children under the age of 18 living with them, 46.4% were married couples living together, 14.2% had a female householder with no husband present, 5.6% had a male householder with no wife present, and 33.7% were non-families. 29.8% of households were one person and 14.2% were one person aged 65 or older. The average household size was 2.28 and the average family size was 2.77.

The median age in the town was 40.1 years. 22.2% of residents were under the age of 18; 7.1% were between the ages of 18 and 24; 27% were from 25 to 44; 26.7% were from 45 to 64; and 17% were 65 or older. The gender makeup of the town was 46.0% male and 54.0% female.

=== 2000 census ===
At the 2000 census there were 1,301 people, 588 households, and 386 families living in the town. The population density was 1,902.5 inhabitants per square mile (738.7/km^{2}). There were 643 housing units at an average density of 940.3 per square mile (365.1/km^{2}). The racial makeup of the town was 96.62% White, 1.15% African American, 0.31% Native American, 0.54% Asian, 0.15% from other races, and 1.23% from two or more races. Hispanic or Latino of any race were 0.61%.

Of the 588 households 26.2% had children under the age of 18 living with them, 45.1% were married couples living together, 17.2% had a female householder with no husband present, and 34.2% were non-families. 31.3% of households were one person and 15.1% were one person aged 65 or older. The average household size was 2.21 and the average family size was 2.75.

The age distribution was 21.5% under the age of 18, 7.8% from 18 to 24, 27.8% from 25 to 44, 26.6% from 45 to 64, and 16.2% 65 or older. The median age was 41 years. For every 100 females, there were 82.7 males. For every 100 females age 18 and over, there were 76.3 males.

The median household income was $26,008 and the median family income was $31,200. Males had a median income of $30,875 versus $17,273 for females. The per capita income for the town was $15,296. About 22.1% of families and 23.6% of the population were below the poverty line, including 41.9% of those under age 18 and 15.1% of those age 65 or over.

== Notable people ==
- Robert Byrd, United States Senator
- Bill Withers, born in neighboring Slab Fork.
- Kai the Hatchet-Wielding Hitchhiker (Caleb Lawrence McGillvary), listed his home as Sophia, West Virginia. Although he lived a nomadic lifestyle.
