= Beckley Feed and Hardware Company =

- U.S. National Register of Historic Places
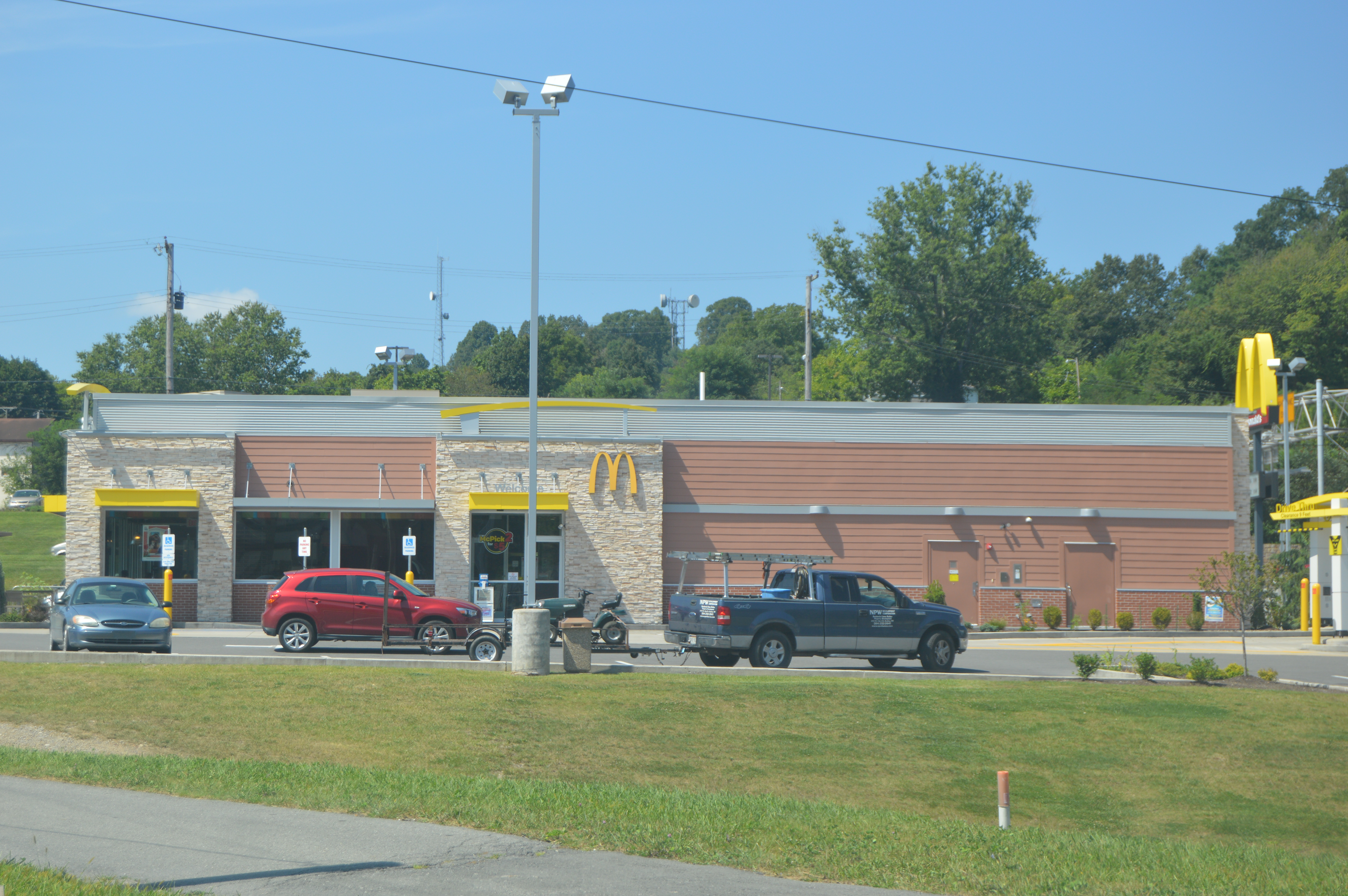
- Side of the McDonald's now occupying the site

- Location within West Virginia Location within the United States
- Location: 405 Prince St., Beckley, West Virginia
- Coordinates: 37°46′25″N 81°11′39″W
- Area: 0.5 acres (0.20 ha)
- Built: 1935
- Architect: S.H. Bridge
- Demolished: 2013
- NRHP reference No.: 00001309
- Added to NRHP: August 24, 2001

Beckley Feed and Hardware Company was a historic commercial building located in Beckley, Raleigh County, West Virginia. The original section was built in 1935 and expanded in 1951. The original section was a two-story building constructed of glazed ceramic block. The 1951 wing was one story in height with a brick facade and a wall of windows.

It was listed on the National Register of Historic Places in 2001.

It was demolished in 2013 and replaced with a McDonald's restaurant the following year.
