= Alfred Beckley =

American politician

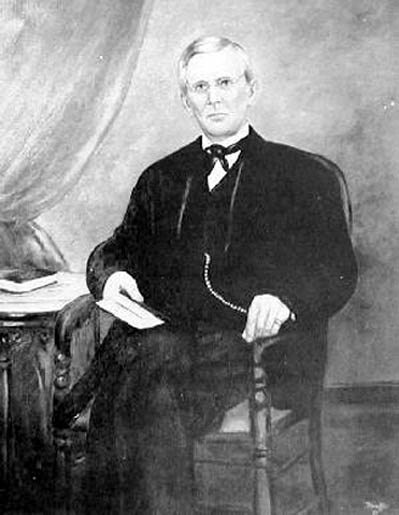
- Born: May 26, 1802; Washington, D.C.
- Died: May 26, 1888 (aged 86); Beckley, West Virginia
- Burial place: Wildwood Cemetery, Beckley, West Virginia
- Military career
- Allegiance: United States of America; Confederate States of America
- Branch: United States Army; Virginia militia
- Service years: 1823–1836 (US Army); 1849–1862 (Virginia militia)
- Rank: First lieutenant (US Army); Brigadier general (Virginia militia)
- Commands: 12th Brigade, Virginia militia
- Conflicts: American Civil War

Alfred Beckley (May 26, 1802 – May 26, 1888) was a public official who founded Beckley, West Virginia, and a brigadier general in the Virginia militia during the American Civil War. He named the city of Beckley in honor of his father, John James Beckley, (Note: What is now the city of Beckley was part of Fayette County until 1850, when Raleigh County was separated from Fayette County. West Virginia was part of Virginia until 1863, when it became a separate state.) (Note: While most sources state that the city of Beckley was named after John James Beckley, some state it was named after Alfred Beckley.) who was the first librarian of the United States Congress.

== Early life ==
Alfred Beckley was born on May 26, 1802, in Washington, D.C., only child of John James Beckley and Maria (or Mary) Prince. In addition to being the first librarian of the United States Congress, John Beckley was also the mayor of Richmond, Virginia, and a clerk for the United States House of Representatives. John Beckley died in 1807, and the family first moved to Pittsburgh, Pennsylvania, then in 1814 to Frankfort, Kentucky.

Beckley was appointed to the United States Military Academy at West Point, having been nominated by William Henry Harrison and President James Monroe; he entered on September 25, 1819, and graduated on July 1, 1823, ninth in a graduating class of 35. This class started with 86 cadets in 1819. He was in the army for 13 years, serving the entire time as an artillery officer in Pennsylvania, Florida, Virginia, and New York.

== Life in Western Virginia ==
About 1832, Beckley married Amelia Neville Craig, daughter of Neville B. Craig, editor of the Pittsburgh Gazette. They had six sons and one daughter: John (b. March 26, 1833), Neville Craig (b. December 27, 1834), Henry Martin (b. November 23, 1836), William Gregory (b. July 29, 1839), Isaac Craig (b. March 3, 1841), Alfred Beckley Jr. (b. March 5, 1843), and Emma Jane (b. January 12, 1845).

In 1834–1835, after lengthy legal disputes, Beckley received the title to 56,679 acres (22,937 ha) his father had owned in western Virginia. In order to manage his inherited estates, Beckley resigned his officer's commission on October 24, 1836. He then settled in Fayette County (now Raleigh County), West Virginia, which was then part of Virginia, finding it a "perfect wilderness".

His home, named Wildwood, was built in 1835–1836, expanded in 1874, and listed on the National Register of Historic Places in 1970.

Beckley was key in founding the city of Beckley on its original 30 acres (12 ha) plat, which was approved by the Virginia General Assembly on April 8, 1838. Beckley served in several public service roles, often in overlapping terms: School Commissioner, 1837–1850; Deputy Clerk of Superior and County Courts, 1838–1850; first postmaster of city of Beckley, 1839; Commissioner of Forfeited and Delinquent Lands, 1839–1850; Master Commissioner in Chancery, 1840–1850 for Fayette County, West Virginia (then part of Virginia); Delegate to the 1844 Whig National Convention, where he voted for Henry Clay for President; (Note: This is often misreported as 1872 because of the way Beckley wrote the pertinent paragraph of his autobiography.) Clerk of Circuit Court of Law and Chancery, 1850–1852, Superintendent of Common Schools, 1850–1873, for Raleigh County; Director and Superintendent of construction of Giles, Fayette and Kanawha Turnpike, 1840–1849; State Director, 1851–1860; President, 1854–1860, of Logan, Raleigh, and Monroe Turnpike; and School Treasurer of Raleigh County.

His wife Amelia died seven weeks after the birth of her daughter, Emma. Emma died in 1848 of scarlet fever.

Beckley returned to military service as a brigadier general in the Virginia Militia from 1849 to 1861; serving out of loyalty to his state even though he strongly opposed its secession from the Union.

Beckley's second wife was Jane B. Rapp, with whom he had three more children: Stuart Heber (b. August 21, 1851), Daniel Webster (b. October 28, 1853), and Maria Elizabeth (b. July 1, 1857).

Beckley was also a Methodist preacher.

== Civil War ==
In 1861, the Virginia Secession Commission would not confirm his nomination by Governor John Letcher for Beckley to lead the 35th Regiment of Virginia Volunteers formed by Letcher in May of that year, and not enough men volunteered, so the 35th Regiment never formed. While in the Virginia Militia during the American Civil War, he served under General Henry A. Wise as part of the Confederate Army. By summer 1861, Beckley was in charge of the 12th Brigade of Virginia militia against Union troops at Cotton Hill, West Virginia, in the Kanawha Valley. This region was largely pro-Union and his militia was not highly motivated, so Wise condemned Beckley's unit in August 1861. Thus, it only served until October 1861, contributing little to the Confederate cause. Beckley even formally complained about the problems finding sufficient recruits to Robert E. Lee. He officially resigned his commission on February 8, 1862. Returning to Union-occupied Beckley, he surrendered to the Union officer in charge, Rutherford B. Hayes, on March 16–17, 1862. He was then arrested by the Union army on April 3, 1862, and sent first to the Atheneum prison camp near Wheeling, West Virginia, and then to Camp Chase, near Columbus, Ohio, as a prisoner of war. He claimed that he was really pro-Union, but had simply been loyal to Virginia, and had severed all ties with the Confederacy. He was released on June 18, 1862, and arrived back in Raleigh County on June 26, 1862. While he did not participate in the war thereafter, at least five of his six sons, except for John, served in the Confederate army.

== Postwar Life ==
His son John was elected Beckley's first mayor in July 1872. After the war, Beckley served as Delegate at Large from West Virginia to the National Democratic Convention at St. Louis, Missouri, in 1876, and was elected in 1877 as Raleigh County's Representative in the West Virginia House of Delegates. In 1877, Alfred Beckley was West Point's oldest living graduate. He was also a leader in the state temperance movement and was elected Grand Worthy Patriarch of the Sons of Temperance, which he regarded as the greatest honor he ever received. He also studied medicine and then practiced it for free.

== Legacy ==
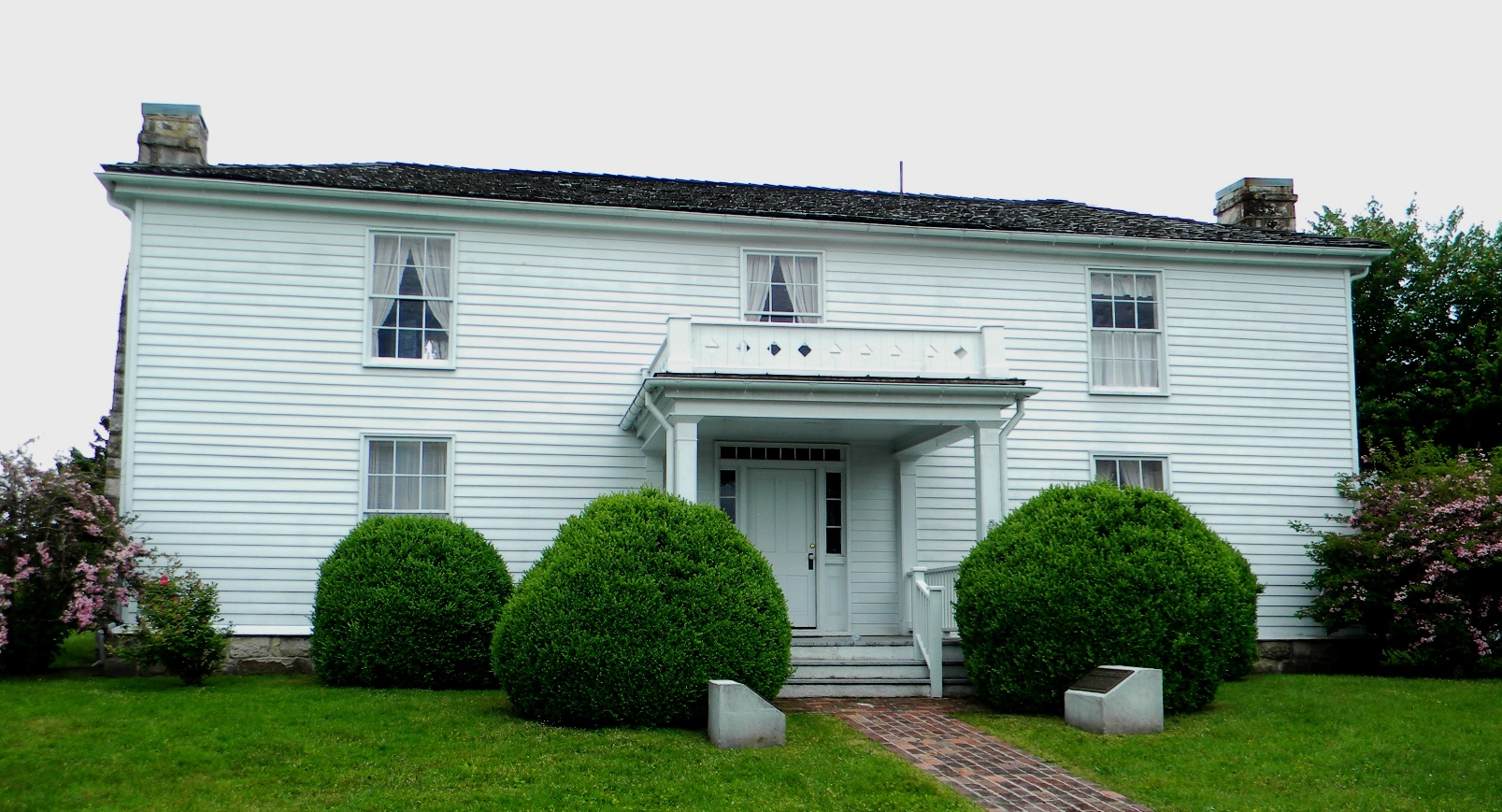
Wildwood

As Beckley came near to the end of his life he sensed he would die on his birthday, and he was correct; he died on May 26, 1888, his 86th birthday. In 1938, a statue of Alfred Beckley was erected in the city of Beckley. A local United States post office is named after him. He is buried at his home's Wildwood Cemetery in Beckley. In 2009, the city of Beckley began holding an annual Founder's Day celebration in his honor.

== Bibliography ==
- Allardice, Bruce S. (1995). More Generals in Gray. Baton Rouge, LA: Louisiana State University Press. ISBN 0-8071-1967-9.
- Bishop (2009). Roane County, West Virginia Families, Part 1927. Baltimore, MD: Genealogical Publishing Company. ISBN 9780806345864.
- Klaus, Fran (2012). Beckley. Charleston, SC: Arcadia Publishing. ISBN 978-0-7385-9205-3.
- Miller, James Henry; Clark, Maude Vest (1908). History of Summers County From the Earliest Settlement to the Present Time. Charlottesville, VA: Digitized by University of Virginia. p. 685.
