= Whitestick Creek =

Stream in West Virginia, U.S.

Coordinates: 37°45′22″N 81°10′09″W

Whitestick Creek is a stream in the U.S. state of West Virginia. The stream is a tributary of Piney Creek which it joins just south of the city of Beckley.

Whitestick most likely is a name derived from an unidentified Native American language.

== See also ==
- List of rivers of West Virginia
