= Patrick Magruder =

American politician and librarian (1768–1819)

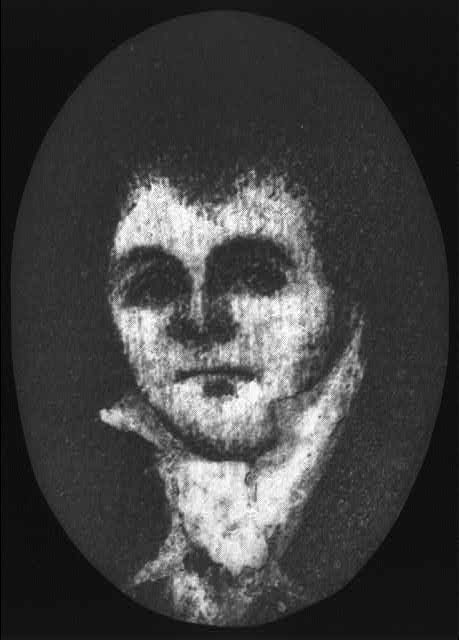

Librarian of Congress
- In office December 26, 1807 – January 18, 1815
- President: Thomas Jefferson; James Madison
- Preceded by: John J. Beckley
- Succeeded by: George Watterston

Member of the U.S. House of Representatives from Maryland's 3rd district
- In office March 4, 1805 – March 3, 1807
- Preceded by: Thomas Plater
- Succeeded by: Philip Key

Personal details
- Born: 1768 Rockville, Maryland Province, British America
- Died: December 24, 1819 (aged 50–51) Petersburg, Virginia, U.S.
- Party: Democratic-Republican
- Spouse(s): Sarah Turner; Martha Goodwyn
- Children: 6
- Education: Princeton University

Patrick Magruder (1768 – December 24, 1819) was an American lawyer, politician, and librarian who served as a Member of the U.S. House of Representatives from Maryland’s 3rd congressional District from March 4, 1805, to March 3, 1807, and as the 2nd Librarian of the United States Congress, from December 26, 1807, to January 18, 1815.

== Biography ==
Patrick Magruder was born on his family's estate, Locust Grove, near Rockville in the Province of Maryland, in 1768, the son of Samuel Wade Magruder and Lucy Beall. Patrick Magruder was the great-grandson of Samuel Magruder, the son of Alexander Magruder. Patrick Magruder attended Princeton College and became a lawyer. In 1804, he was elected to be a Member of the U.S. House of Representatives from Maryland's 3rd congressional district, and served from March 4, 1805, to March 3, 1807. After the death of John J. Beckley, President Thomas Jefferson appointed Magruder to the dual post of Clerk of the United States House of Representatives and Librarian of Congress. The posts were not separated until 1815. Magruder served as the 2nd Librarian of the United States Congress from December 26, 1807, to January 18, 1815. During the War of 1812, the British burned Washington, D.C., including the Library of Congress, which was then housed in the US Capitol Building. After an investigation by Congress into the destruction of the library and the use of its funds, Magruder resigned. He died December 24, 1819, in Petersburg, Virginia, and was buried on his family's ancestral estate, Sweden, near Petersburg in Dinwiddie County, Virginia. Magruder, who first married Sarah Turner, and then Martha Goodwyn, had six children.

U.S. House of Representatives
Preceded by Thomas Plater	Member of the U.S. House of Representatives from Maryland's 2nd congressional district 1805–1807	Succeeded by Philip Key
