= Wildwood (Beckley, West Virginia) =

Historic house in West Virginia, United States

- U.S. National Register of Historic Places
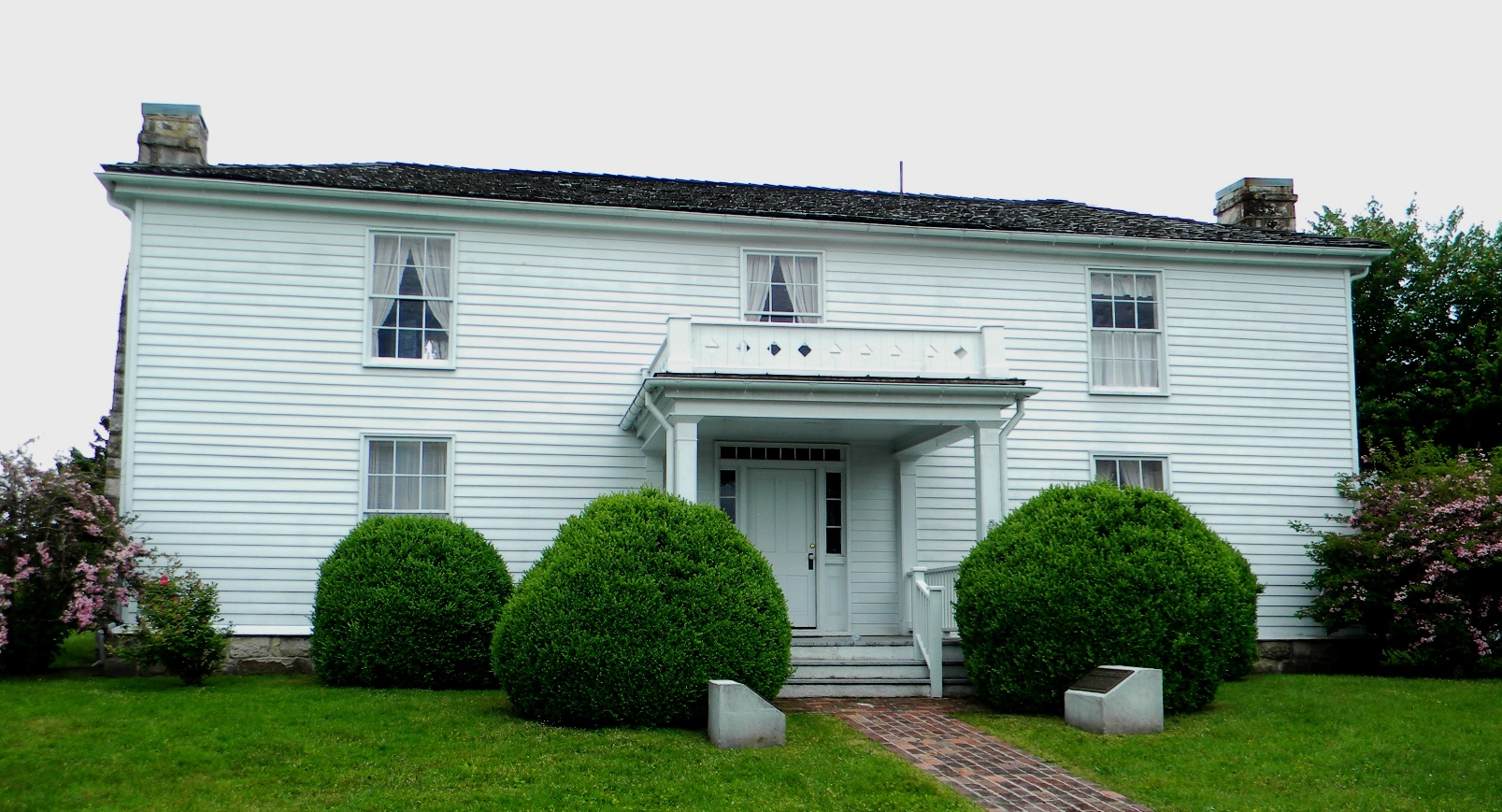
- Wildwood Residence at Beckley, May 2013

- Location within West Virginia Location within the United States
- Location: 117 Laurel Ter., Beckley, West Virginia
- Coordinates: 37°46′15″N 81°11′12″W
- Area: 0.5 acres (0.20 ha)
- Built: 1835
- Architect: Lilly, John
- NRHP reference No.: 70000665
- Added to NRHP: August 25, 1970

Wildwood, also known as the General Alfred Beckley Home, is a historic home located at Beckley, Raleigh County, West Virginia. The house is open as the Wildwood House Museum and was listed on the National Register of Historic Places in 1970.

== History ==
General Alfred Beckley (1802–88) wanted his home to be the center of what he envisioned for Beckley, West Virginia which he founded in 1838. Although his town was a piece of paper in 1838, it would later become the county seat of Raleigh County, West Virginia, which was also founded by Beckley in 1850. His house was built in 1835–36, initially as an unpretentious double log cabin. "I took possession of a double log cabin built for me in the fall of 1835 by Mr. John Lilly Sr. of Bluestone.." Originally, the residence was named Park Place. According to Alfred Beckley, "I changed the name of my residence from 'Park Place', a name given it by my kinsman, Clarkson Prince to that of 'Wildwood'".

== Description ==
The current appearance of Wildwood began in 1874 with remodeling by Alfred Beckley. This included the addition of a kitchen and dining room to the back of the house. The log cabins exterior was also covered in white clapboard. This was replaced in the 1970s with aluminum siding. Most of the original pine floor exists, and wood beams have been exposed within parts of the house to demonstrate its log cabin origins. There have been plans to restore the structure to its original 1874 appearance.
