= Kai the Hitchhiker =

Canadian hitchhiker and convicted murderer (born 1988)

Caleb Lawrence McGillvary
- McGillvary in the viral video "Kai the Hatchet-Wielding Hitchhiker"
- Born: Caleb Lawrence McGillvary; September 3, 1988 (age 38); Edmonton, Alberta, Canada
- Other name: Caleb Kai Lawrence Yodhehwawheh
- Known for: Viral video as "Kai the Hatchet-Wielding Hitchhiker"
- Conviction: Murder
- Penalty: 57 years imprisonment

Details
- Imprisoned at: New Jersey State Prison

Caleb Lawrence McGillvary (born September 3, 1988), also known as Kai, is a Canadian man who first became known from the internet viral video "Kai the Hatchet-Wielding Hitchhiker", which featured him recounting a crime he witnessed while hitchhiking. McGillvary subsequently received national attention in the press. In 2019, McGillvary was convicted of murder in New Jersey. He cited the fallout from the video as part of his defense against the homicide charge. In 2023, Netflix debuted the documentary The Hatchet Wielding Hitchhiker about McGillvary's rise to fame and murder trial.

== Personal life ==
McGillvary was born on September 3, 1988, in Edmonton, Alberta. He has stated that he was raised in a fundamentalist Christian cult, that his parents were divorced, and that he had been molested in his youth. As a teenager, he moved with his family to St. Paul, Alberta, and attended St. Paul Regional High School.

McGillvary has also stated that he adopted the name "Kai" after taking part in a "spirit walk" while living on an Indigenous reservation.

Prior to the Fresno incident in 2013, McGillvary had been living as a transient, which he has described as "homefree". He stated that he did not have health insurance, a social security card, a driver's license, a passport, or any official form of identification.

== Fresno incident ==
In February 2013, McGillvary was interviewed and videotaped by local Fox affiliate KMPH-TV in Fresno, California. McGillvary recounted he had been hitchhiking and was picked up by Jett Simmons McBride, whom McGillvary describes as weighing 300 pounds (140 kg), and who claimed to be Jesus Christ. McBride began telling McGillvary about his background, including having raped a 14-year-old girl in the Virgin Islands while on a business trip. While recounting his life story, McBride suddenly crashed his car into a parked utility truck, pinning a worker between his front bumper and the rear of the truck. McGillvary got out to help the man, while McBride remained in the car. When a female bystander arrived on the scene to help the stricken worker, McBride exited the vehicle and attacked her with a bear hug. Believing the woman's life was in danger and that he could snap her neck "like a pencil stick", McGillvary removed a hatchet from his backpack and repeatedly struck McBride in the back of the head. In a "zany" retelling, McGillvary reenacts the overhead swings and describes the hatchet blows as "Smash, smash, SUH-MASH!" McGillvary recounts he was later interrogated by police and set free.

The video was uploaded to YouTube on February 2, 2013, by Jessob Reisbeck, who had conducted the interview for KMPH. As of October 19, 2025, the video has over 8.6 million views. The Gregory Brothers sampled the interview and turned it into a song, furthering the video's reach. As a result of the original video's viral nature, McGillvary received extensive offers from various news and entertainment sources seeking interviews and appearances. This resulted in his appearing on Jimmy Kimmel Live! on February 11, 2013. In January 2020, McGillvary was interviewed on Inside Edition, where scenes from the viral video were replayed.

== Murder conviction ==
McGillvary was arrested on murder charges on May 16, 2013, for the death of New Jersey attorney Joseph Galfy. According to McGillvary, Galfy offered McGillvary a place to stay for the night, only to drug and rape him. Police said the sexual encounter was consensual and the murder premeditated. However, there were several discrepancies in their investigation, including: denying McGillvary a rape kit; allowing the victim's brother to work as an officer at the crime scene; washing the glasses that should've been tested to prove or disprove McGillvary's claim of being drugged; and, not adequately testing the blood on the scene. McGillvary contended that he acted in self defense, and after the viral video in California, he had no need to have sex with men like Galfy, whom McGillvary described as unattractive, stating, "Do you know how many hot chicks—never mind. Even if I was gay, do you know how many hot guys wanted to fuck me after that shit in California? I'm not even being vain. It's just a fact, like—no offense, but he [Galfy] was not a looker". In July 2013, McGillvary was hospitalized after suffering from self-inflicted wounds while awaiting trial at Union County Jail in New Jersey.

After the murder charges, viewership of the Fresno meme video increased substantially, broadening its viral reach. Fans of the video, who considered McGillvary a hero for saving the woman, raised a legal fund for the New Jersey case. McGillvary was imprisoned for over five years while awaiting trial, which began on April 1, 2019. McGillvary took the stand in his own defense and was combative during cross-examination. He had an outburst during his defense lawyer's closing arguments, nearly leading to his expulsion from the courtroom. A jury found him guilty of murder, and he was sentenced to 57 years in prison. He is to serve 85 percent of that term before the possibility of parole, with the judge telling McGillvary, "when you become eligible for parole, you will still be younger than Mr. Galfy was when you murdered him". After accounting for the time of pre-trial confinement, McGillvary will have just turned 73 when he becomes eligible for parole, in approximately October 2061. Galfy was 73 at the time of his death. McGillvary appealed the conviction, alleging 15 instances of "misconduct, abuse of discretion, and ineffectiveness of defense counsel", but the murder conviction was upheld by the New Jersey Appellate Court in August 2021.

He has been incarcerated at the New Jersey State Prison in Trenton since his sentencing.

== Netflix documentary ==
On January 10, 2023, Netflix released the documentary The Hatchet Wielding Hitchhiker, chronicling McGillvary's story, including interviews with Reisbeck, members of Jimmy Kimmel's staff, McGillvary's family, and law enforcement figures involved in his case. In the immediate days following the documentary's release, media interest in McGillvary's case increased.

In response to the documentary, McGillvary claimed that Netflix did not pay him, and he had been "ruthlessly exploited".
