= Jonathan Condy =

American lawyer

Jonathan William Condy (1770–1828) was an American lawyer. At the time of his election as Clerk of the United States House of Representatives, he was a politically well connected young law student, and, backed by the Federalists, was elected to the office in a close 41–40 vote. He served from 1797 until 1799.

Condy was a member of the Philadelphia Bar.

In 1796 he wrote a description of the Susquehanna River.

He was a leader of Emanuel Swedenborg's New Jerusalem Church in Philadelphia.
