= Sophia Historic District =

Historic district in West Virginia, United States

- U.S. National Register of Historic Places
- U.S. Historic district
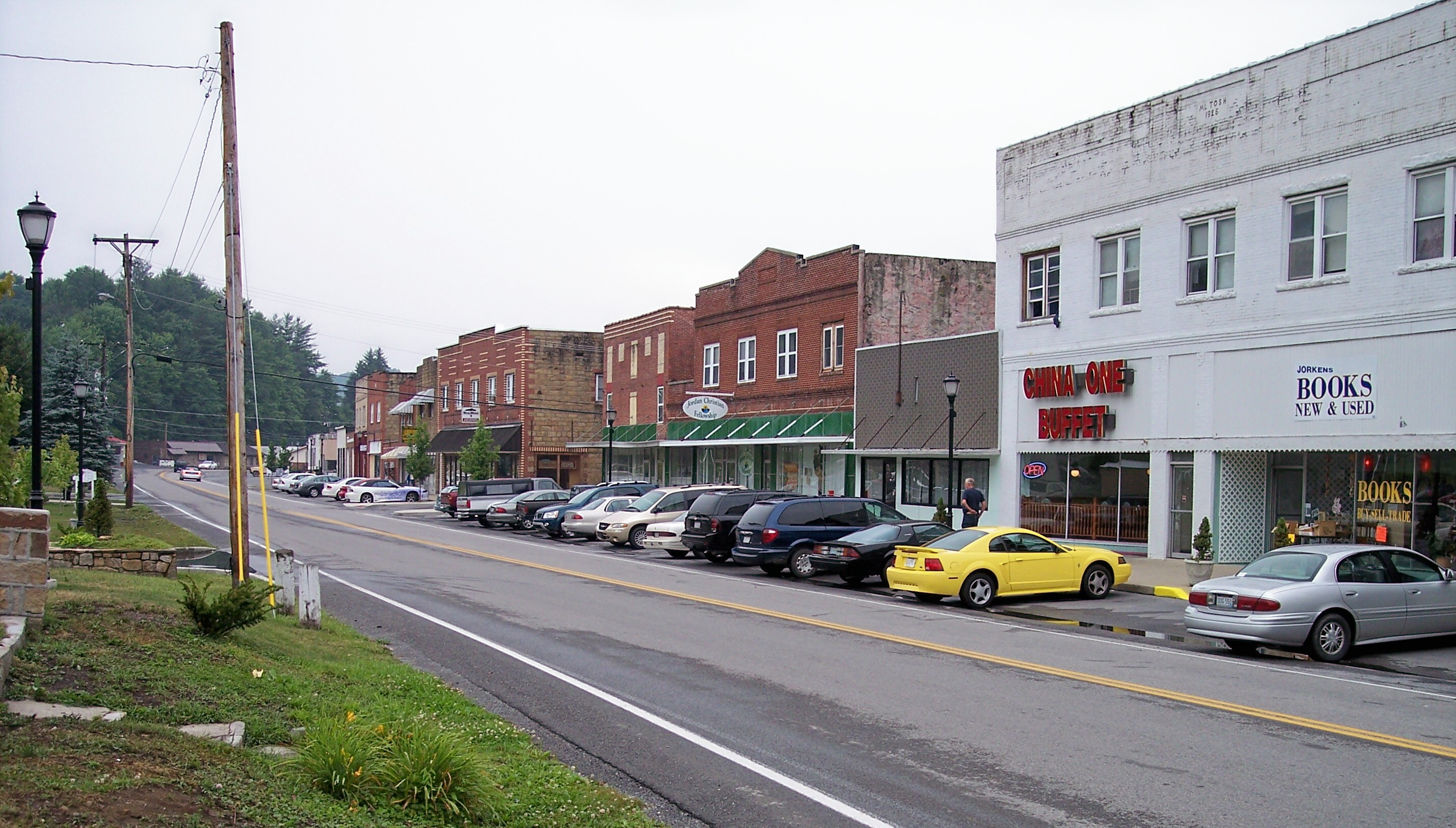
- Sophia Historic District, July 2007

- Location within West Virginia Location within the United States
- Location: Main St., bet. Polk St. and Riffe St., Sophia, West Virginia
- Coordinates: 37°42′34″N 81°15′7″W
- Area: 5 acres (2.0 ha)
- Architect: Milano
- Architectural style: Early Commercial
- NRHP reference No.: 06000163
- Added to NRHP: March 22, 2006

Sophia Historic District is a national historic district located at Sophia, Raleigh County, West Virginia. It encompasses 22 contributing buildings located in the central business district of Sophia. The consist primarily of one and two story masonry buildings with storefronts on the first floor and housing in the upper stories. Notable buildings include the Filling Station (c. 1925), Reck's Place/The Chestnut Tree Café and Art Gallery (c. 1936), Attili Building (1939), Visionz Lounge (c. 1955), LB & J Antiques (1937), Ben Franklin / Federated Department Store (c. 1937), and Sophia Theater (c. 1925).

It was listed on the National Register of Historic Places in 2006.
