= St. Colman's Roman Catholic Church and Cemetery =

Historic church and cemetery in Raleigh County, West Virginia, US

- U.S. National Register of Historic Places
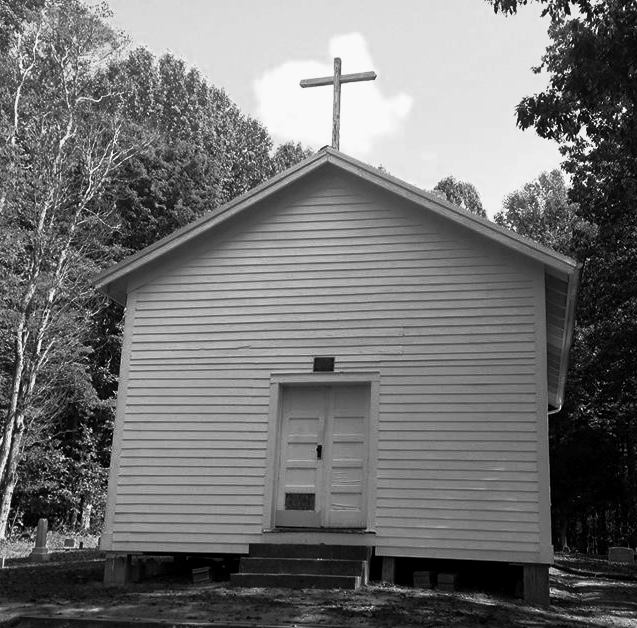

- Location within West Virginia Location within the United States
- Nearest city: Sandstone, West Virginia
- Coordinates: 37°45′57″N 80°55′15″W
- Area: 1 acre (0.40 ha)
- Built: 1877
- NRHP reference No.: 84003658
- Added to NRHP: August 23, 1984

St. Colman's Roman Catholic Church and Cemetery (also known as The Little Catholic Church on Irish Mountain) is a historic church located in Dillon, West Virginia which is also called Irish Mountain.

It was built in 1877 and added to the National Register of Historic Places in 1984.

On June 26, 2022, the church burned to the ground in what is believed to be arson.
