= Dillon, West Virginia =

Unincorporated community in West Virginia, United States

Dillon
- Unincorporated community
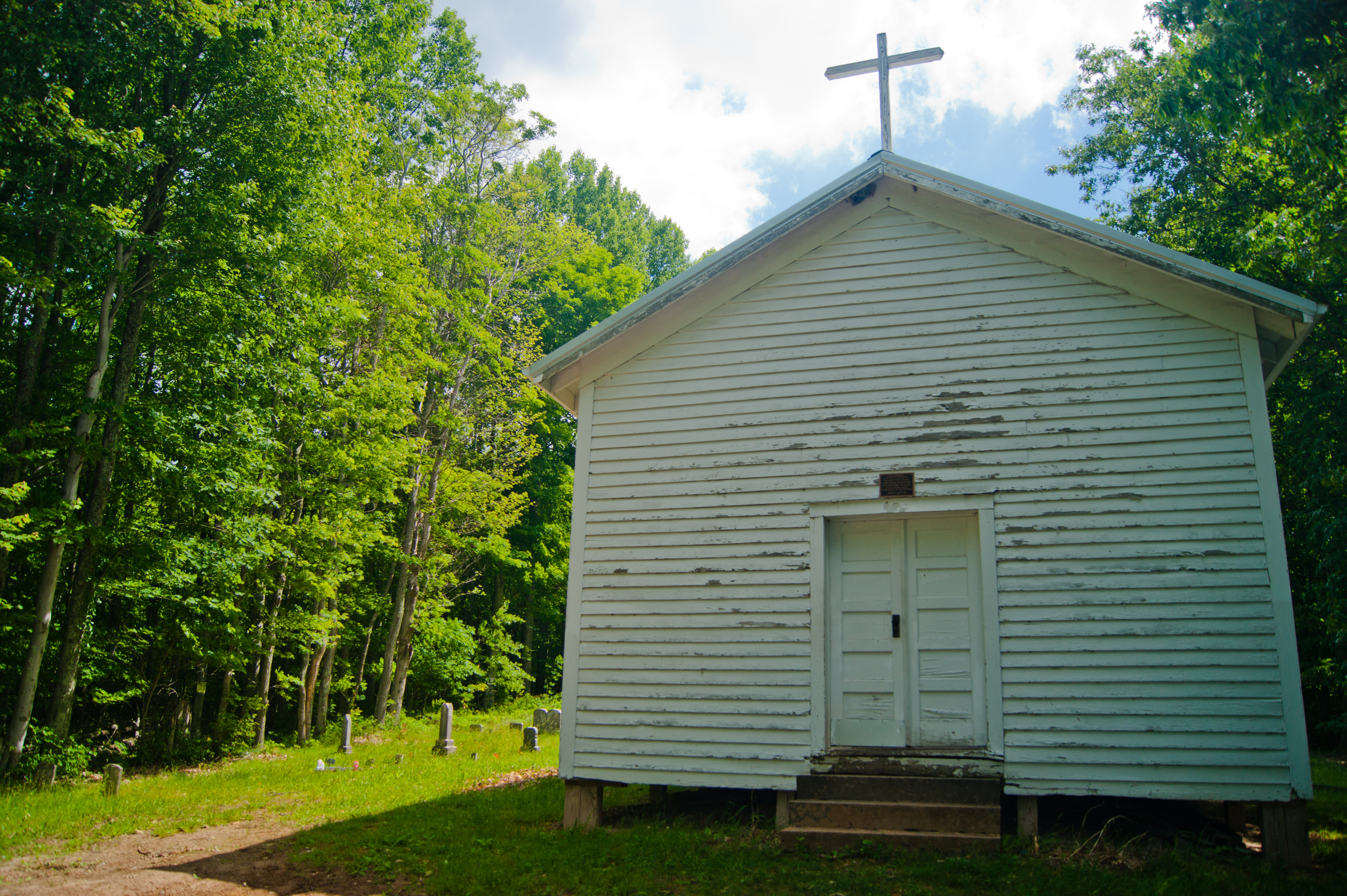

- Location within the state of West Virginia Dillon (the United States)
- Coordinates: 37°46′13″N 80°57′2″W
- Country: United States
- State: West Virginia
- County: Raleigh
- Elevation: 2,612 ft (796 m)
- Time zone: UTC-5 (Eastern (EST))
  - Summer (DST): UTC-4 (EDT)
- GNIS ID: 1554303

Dillon is an unincorporated community in Raleigh County, West Virginia, United States. It was also known as Irish Mountain and is the location of St. Colman's Roman Catholic Church and Cemetery, which is on the National Register of Historic Places.

The community was named after the local Dillon family.
