= Trump–Lilly Farmstead =

Historic house in West Virginia, United States

- U.S. National Register of Historic Places
- U.S. Historic district
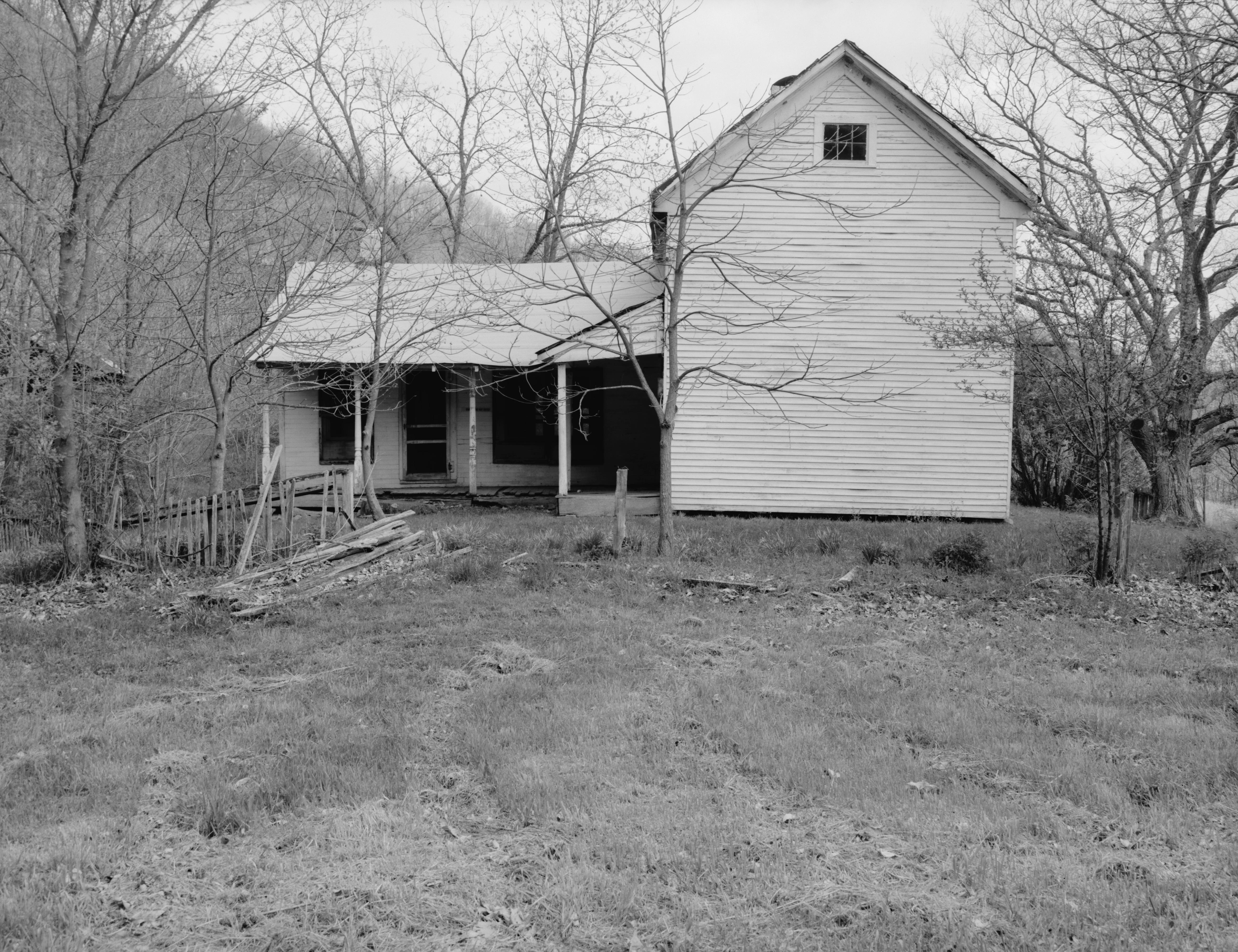
- Front of the farmhouse

- Location within West Virginia Location within the United States
- Nearest city: Hinton, West Virginia
- Coordinates: 37°41′54″N 80°54′1″W
- Area: 202 acres (82 ha)
- Architect: Trump, Richard
- Architectural style: Vernacular Appalachian Front
- NRHP reference No.: 90001640
- Added to NRHP: November 8, 1990

The Trump–Lilly Farmstead is a historic farmstead located near Hinton, in Raleigh and Summers County, West Virginia. The property includes seven contributing buildings and one contributing site, representative of a frontier Appalachian farm. The main house is a typical two-story southern farmhouse with a side-gabled roof. The farm was sold to the National Park Service in 1988.

It was listed on the National Register of Historic Places in 1990.
