= Beckley, West Virginia =

City in West Virginia, US

- City
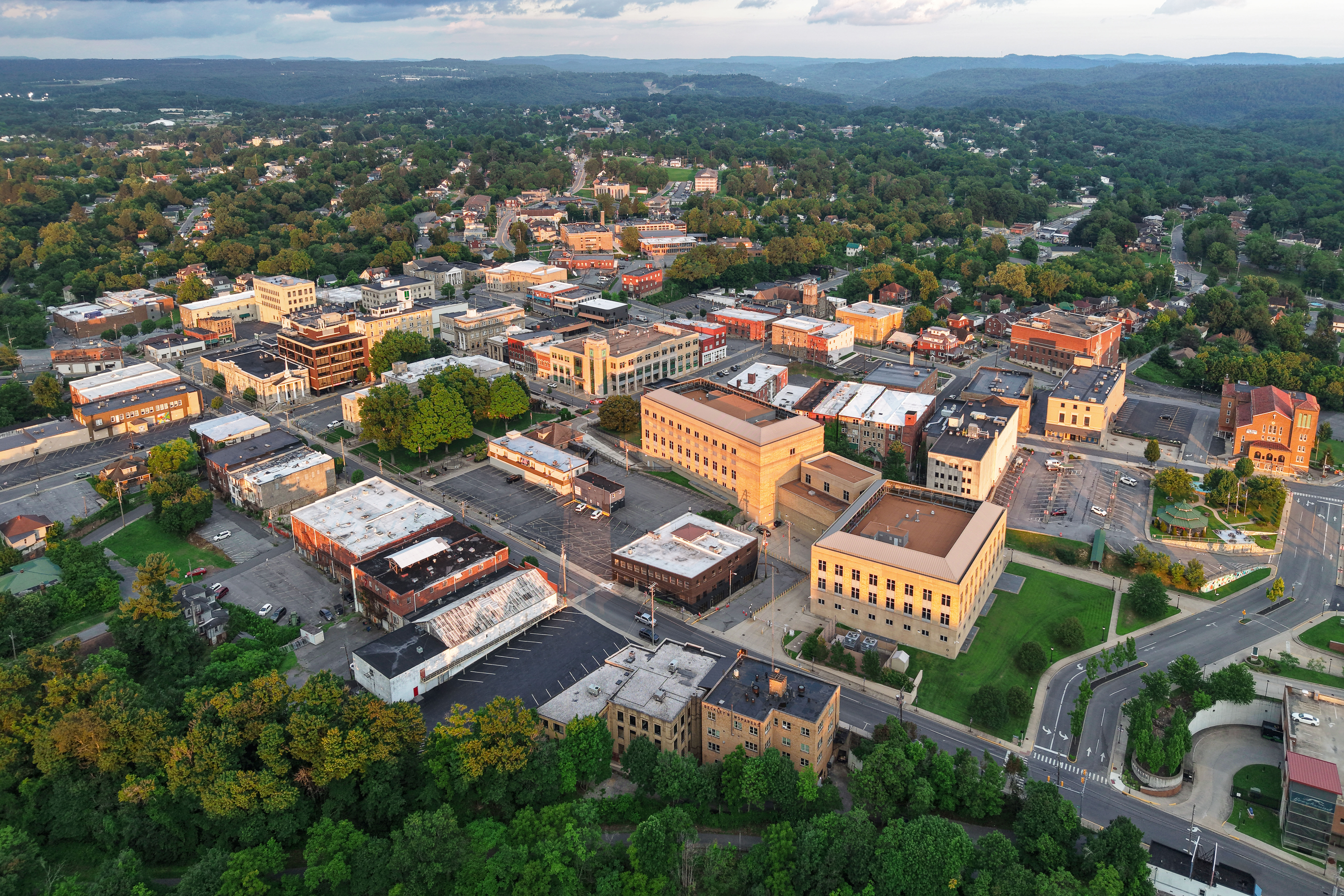
- Downtown Beckley in 2026

- Flag Seal
- Nickname: Smokeless Coal Capital
- Motto: "The Gateway to Southern West Virginia"
- Interactive map of Beckley, West Virginia
- Location within West Virginia Location within the United States
- Coordinates: 37°46′27″N 81°10′52″W
- Country: United States
- State: West Virginia
- County: Raleigh

Government
  - Mayor: Ryan Neal

Area
  - City: 9.51 sq mi (24.63 km^{2})
  - Land: 9.50 sq mi (24.60 km^{2})
  - Water: 0.012 sq mi (0.03 km^{2})
- Elevation: 2,405 ft (733 m)

Population (2020)
  - City: 17,286
  - Density: 1,821.5/sq mi (703.28/km^{2})
  - Metro: 123,373 (US: 317th)
- Time zone: UTC−5 (Eastern (EST))
  - Summer (DST): UTC−4 (EDT)
- ZIP codes: 25801, 25802, 25926
- Area codes: 304 and 681
- FIPS code: 54-05332
- GNIS feature ID: 2390563
- Website: https://beckley.gov/

Beckley is a city in Raleigh County, West Virginia, United States, and its county seat. The population was 17,286 at the 2020 census, making it the ninth-most populous city in the state. It is the principal city of the Beckley metropolitan area of Southern West Virginia, home to 115,079 residents in 2020. Beckley was founded on April 4, 1838, and was long known for its ties to the coal mining industry. It is the home of the West Virginia University Institute of Technology, as well as an annex of Concord University and the University of Charleston.

== History ==
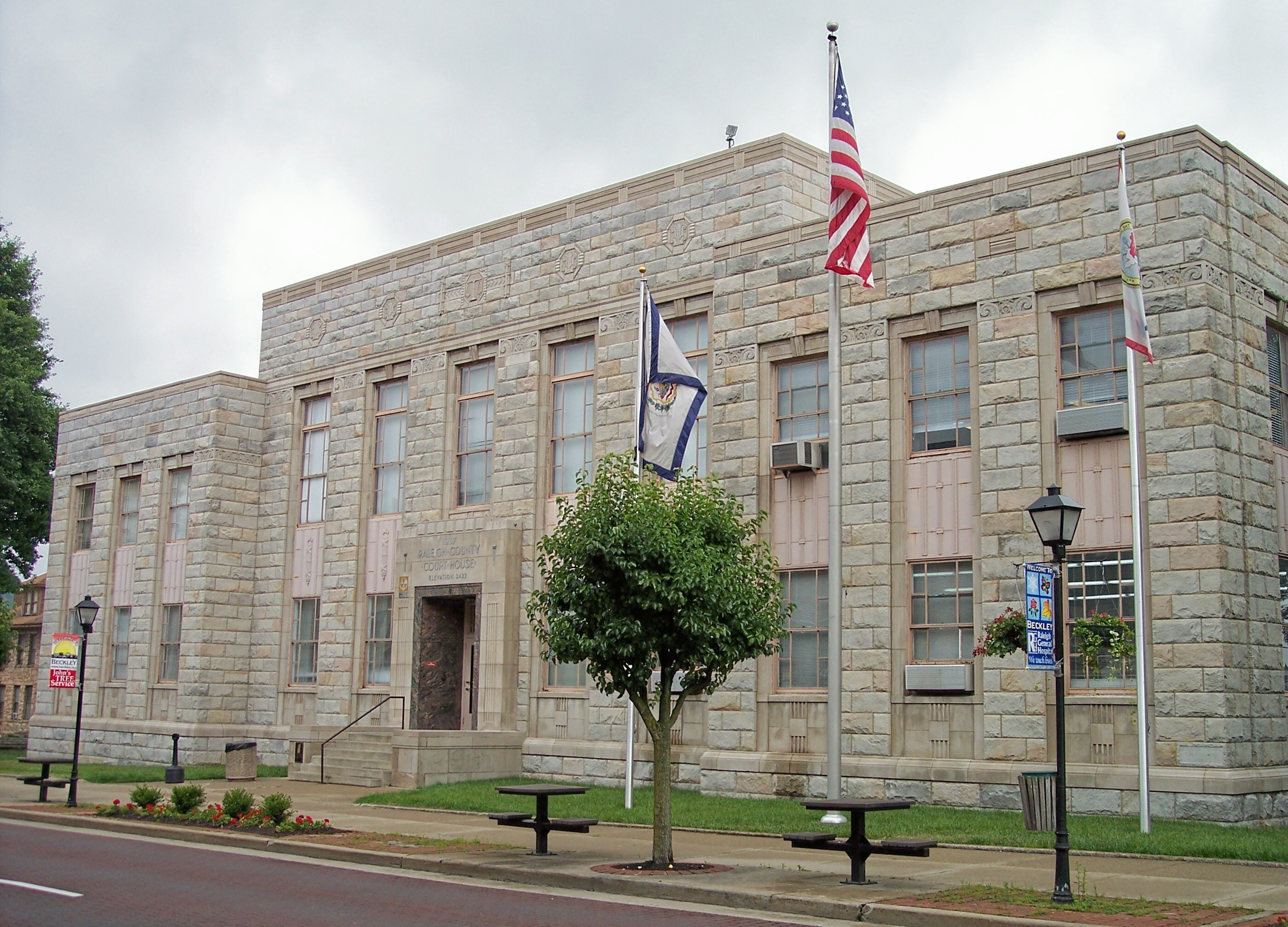
Raleigh County Courthouse, part of the Beckley Courthouse Square Historic District

The area surrounding Beckley was long home to many indigenous peoples. Early encounters describe the land as being an ancestral home of the Catawba-speaking Moneton people, who referred to the surrounding area as Okahok Amai, and were allies of the Monacan people. The Moneton's Catawba speaking neighbors to the south, the Tutelo (since absorbed into the Seneca-Cayuga Nation) may have absorbed surviving Moneton communities, and claim the area as ancestral lands. Cherokee and Shawnee and Yuchi peoples also claim the area as included in their traditional lands. Conflicts with European settlers resulted in various displaced Indian tribes settling in West Virginia, where they were known as Mingo, meaning "remote affiliates of the Iroquois Confederacy".

Beckley was named in honor of John James Beckley, who was the first Clerk of the House of Representatives and the first Librarian of Congress. It was founded by his son, Alfred Beckley (US Army lieutenant and brigadier general of Virginia militia), who was from the District of Columbia.

Although founded in 1838, Beckley existed only on paper at that time. Alfred Beckley said he "was frequently jeered and laughed at for his Paper Town..." Early in its history, the town was known as Beckley, Raleigh Court House, and, occasionally, Beckleyville.

The town was originally located in Fayette County, Virginia. In 1850 the act of the Virginia legislature creating Raleigh County named Beckley the county seat. The city is sometimes called the "Smokeless Coal Capital", "The City of Champions" and the "Gateway To Southern West Virginia."

During the presidential primaries of 1960, the vehicles of rivals John F. Kennedy and Hubert Humphrey stopped at the same streetcorner in Beckley. Recognizing each other, the two men got out and chatted briefly.

== Geography ==
According to the United States Census Bureau, the city has a total area of 9.50 square miles (24.60 km^{2}), of which 9.49 square miles (24.58 km^{2}) is land and 0.01 square miles (0.03 km^{2}) is water.

=== Geology and topography ===
The city sits atop the Allegheny Plateau, with the more steeply eroded Logan Plateau bordering to the west and the highland Allegheny Mountains lying to the east. Neighboring ridgelines include Flat Top Mountain to the south, Scott Ridge of Shady Spring Mountain to the southeast, Batoff Mountain to the northeast, and Lilly Mountain to the west.

=== Water ===
Beckley is mostly contained in the Piney Creek watershed, which flows into the New River National Park and Reserve. The city is roughly bordered by Piney Creek to the east, and to the south by its tributary Whitestick Creek. Cranberry Creek and its southern tributary Little Whitestick Creek flow through the northern part of the city. The northwestern corner of the city, around Tamarack, includes the headwaters of Paint Creek, another New River tributary. Neighboring watersheds include Glade Creek to the east, headwaters of the Coal River to the west, and headwaters of the Guyandotte River to the southwest.

=== Climate ===
Due to its elevation, the climate of Beckley is humid subtropical (Köppen Cfa) bordering on both an oceanic (Köppen Cfb) and humid continental (Köppen Dfa/Dfb), and the city straddles the border between USDA Plant Hardiness Zones 6B and 7A. Summers are warm and humid, usually a few degrees cooler than lower-elevation places within the state, with an average of only 1.3 days of a maximum at or above 90 °F (32 °C) annually. Winters are generally cold and snowy with occasional intervening milder periods and an average of 1.4 nights annually with a minimum of 0 °F (−18 °C) or lower. Normal monthly daily mean temperatures range from 32.2 °F (0.1 °C) in January to 71.6 °F (22.0 °C) in July. Snowfall varies with an average of 55.9 inches (142 cm) per season and mostly occurs from December to March with an occasional snowfall in November of (usually) 2–3 inches (5–8 cm). Record temperatures range from −22 °F (−30 °C) on January 21, 1985, up to 103 °F (39 °C) on July 21 and August 11, 1926; the extreme coldest daily maximum was −3 °F (−19 °C) on February 13, 1899, while, conversely, the extreme warmest daily minimum was 79 °F (26 °C) on July 7, 1924, and August 22, 1926. On average, the first and last occurrences of freezing temperatures in the cooler season are October 13 and April 30, respectively, allowing for a growing season of 165 days.

Climate data for Beckley, West Virginia (Raleigh County Airport), 1991–2020 normals, (Note: Mean monthly maxima and minima (i.e. the expected highest and lowest temperature readings at any point during the year or given month) calculated based on data at said location from 1991 to 2020.) extremes 1896–present
Month	Jan	Feb	Mar	Apr	May	Jun	Jul	Aug	Sep	Oct	Nov	Dec	Year
Record high °F (°C)	74 (23)	77 (25)	85 (29)	87 (31)	92 (33)	100 (38)	103 (39)	103 (39)	97 (36)	91 (33)	80 (27)	75 (24)	103 (39)
Mean maximum °F (°C)	62.3 (16.8)	64.5 (18.1)	72.8 (22.7)	80.8 (27.1)	83.1 (28.4)	86.1 (30.1)	87.5 (30.8)	86.5 (30.3)	84.6 (29.2)	78.5 (25.8)	71.3 (21.8)	63.6 (17.6)	88.8 (31.6)
Mean daily maximum °F (°C)	40.5 (4.7)	44.2 (6.8)	52.5 (11.4)	64.4 (18.0)	71.5 (21.9)	77.8 (25.4)	80.7 (27.1)	79.9 (26.6)	74.4 (23.6)	64.3 (17.9)	53.2 (11.8)	43.9 (6.6)	62.3 (16.8)
Daily mean °F (°C)	32.2 (0.1)	35.4 (1.9)	42.8 (6.0)	53.5 (11.9)	61.3 (16.3)	68.2 (20.1)	71.6 (22.0)	70.5 (21.4)	64.7 (18.2)	54.3 (12.4)	44.0 (6.7)	36.0 (2.2)	52.9 (11.6)
Mean daily minimum °F (°C)	24.0 (−4.4)	26.6 (−3.0)	33.1 (0.6)	42.6 (5.9)	51.1 (10.6)	58.7 (14.8)	62.4 (16.9)	61.1 (16.2)	55.0 (12.8)	44.2 (6.8)	34.7 (1.5)	28.0 (−2.2)	43.5 (6.4)
Mean minimum °F (°C)	2.0 (−16.7)	6.5 (−14.2)	12.2 (−11.0)	24.7 (−4.1)	34.9 (1.6)	45.5 (7.5)	52.3 (11.3)	50.8 (10.4)	40.2 (4.6)	27.5 (−2.5)	17.0 (−8.3)	9.1 (−12.7)	−1.0 (−18.3)
Record low °F (°C)	−22 (−30)	−20 (−29)	−7 (−22)	8 (−13)	21 (−6)	32 (0)	38 (3)	33 (1)	23 (−5)	9 (−13)	−1 (−18)	−20 (−29)	−22 (−30)
Average precipitation inches (mm)	3.13 (80)	3.12 (79)	4.03 (102)	3.58 (91)	4.68 (119)	4.30 (109)	5.00 (127)	3.68 (93)	3.20 (81)	2.73 (69)	2.80 (71)	3.29 (84)	43.54 (1,106)
Average snowfall inches (cm)	15.5 (39)	15.2 (39)	8.9 (23)	1.5 (3.8)	0.0 (0.0)	0.0 (0.0)	0.0 (0.0)	0.0 (0.0)	0.0 (0.0)	1.4 (3.6)	2.3 (5.8)	11.1 (28)	55.9 (142)
Average precipitation days (≥ 0.01 in)	15.0	14.4	16.2	14.1	15.0	13.7	13.5	11.5	10.0	10.7	11.8	14.6	160.5
Average snowy days (≥ 0.1 in)	8.5	7.2	5.6	1.5	0.0	0.0	0.0	0.0	0.0	0.3	2.8	6.6	32.5
Average relative humidity (%)	74	71	67	62	70	76	78	79	79	73	70	74	73
Source: NOAA (humidity 1981–2010)

== Demographics ==
Historical population
Census	Pop.	Note	%±
1880	144		—
1890	158		9.7%
1900	342		116.5%
1910	2,161		531.9%
1920	4,149		92.0%
1930	9,357		125.5%
1940	12,852		37.4%
1950	19,397		50.9%
1960	18,642		−3.9%
1970	19,884		6.7%
1980	20,492		3.1%
1990	18,274		−10.8%
2000	17,254		−5.6%
2010	17,614		2.1%
2020	17,286		−1.9%
2024 (est.)	16,515		−4.5%
U.S. Decennial Census

=== 2020 census ===
As of the 2020 census, Beckley had a population of 17,286. The median age was 42.0 years. 20.6% of residents were under the age of 18 and 21.0% of residents were 65 years of age or older. For every 100 females there were 91.8 males, and for every 100 females age 18 and over there were 90.3 males age 18 and over.

100.0% of residents lived in urban areas, while 0.0% lived in rural areas.

There were 7,607 households in Beckley, of which 25.6% had children under the age of 18 living in them. Of all households, 32.9% were married-couple households, 22.5% were households with a male householder and no spouse or partner present, and 37.1% were households with a female householder and no spouse or partner present. About 38.7% of all households were made up of individuals and 17.2% had someone living alone who was 65 years of age or older.

There were 8,796 housing units, of which 13.5% were vacant. The homeowner vacancy rate was 2.7% and the rental vacancy rate was 11.4%.

Racial composition as of the 2020 census
Race	Number	Percent
White	12,119	70.1%
Black or African American	3,413	19.7%
American Indian and Alaska Native	41	0.2%
Asian	409	2.4%
Native Hawaiian and Other Pacific Islander	10	0.1%
Some other race	178	1.0%
Two or more races	1,116	6.5%
Hispanic or Latino (of any race)	376	2.2%

=== 2010 census ===
As of the census of 2010, there were 17,614 people, 7,800 households, and 4,414 families living in the city. The population density was 1,856.1 inhabitants per square mile (716.6/km^{2}). There were 8,839 housing units at an average density of 931.4 units per square mile (359.6 units/km^{2}). The racial makeup of the city was 72.3% White, 21.2% African American, 0.3% Native American, 2.4% Asian, 0.5% from other races, and 3.2% from two or more races. Hispanic or Latino of any race were 1.5% of the population.

There were 7,800 households, of which 25.6% had children under the age of 18 living with them, 36.8% were married couples living together, 15.5% had a female householder with no husband present, 4.2% had a male householder with no wife present, and 43.4% were non-families. 37.5% of all households were made up of individuals, and 15.4% had someone living alone who was 65 years of age or older. The average household size was 2.17 and the average family size was 2.85.

The median age in the city was 41.6 years. 20.2% of residents were under the age of 18; 9.5% were between the ages of 18 and 24; 23.9% were from 25 to 44; 28.5% were from 45 to 64; and 17.9% were 65 years of age or older. The gender makeup of the city was 46.6% male and 53.4% female.

=== 2000 census ===
As of the census of 2000, there were 17,254 people, 7,651 households, and 4,590 families living in the city. The population density was 1,874.9 people per square mile (723.9 people/km^{2}). There were 8,731 housing units at an average density of 948.8 units per square mile (366.3 units/km^{2}). The racial makeup of the city was 73.64% White, 22.89% African American, 0.14% Native American, 1.89% Asian, 0.02% Pacific Islander, 0.21% from other races, and 1.22% from two or more races. Hispanic or Latino of any race were 0.74% of the population.

There were 7,651 households, out of which 25.1% had children under the age of 18 living with them, 40.9% were married couples living together, 16.2% had a female householder with no husband present, and 40.0% were non-families. 35.6% of all households were made up of individuals, and 16.5% had someone living alone who was 65 years of age or older. The average household size was 2.18 and the average family size was 2.83.

In the city, the population was spread out, with 21.8% under the age of 18, 8.3% from 18 to 24, 25.3% from 25 to 44, 24.4% from 45 to 64, and 20.2% who were 65 years of age or older. The median age was 42 years. For every 100 females, there were 82.0 males. For every 100 females age 18 and over, there were 77.1 males.

The median income for a household in the city was $28,122, and the median income for a family was $38,110. Males had a median income of $35,780 versus $23,239 for females. The per capita income for the city was $18,912. About 16.4% of families and 20.9% of the population were below the poverty line, including 33.9% of those under age 18 and 9.5% of those age 65 or over.

== Arts and culture ==
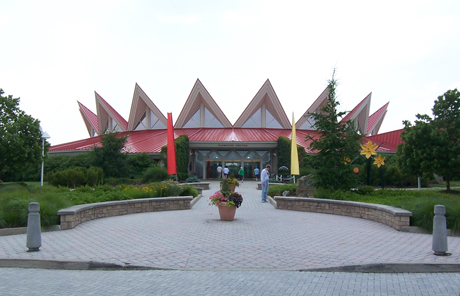
Tamarack Marketplace

The Beckley Exhibition Coal Mine is a preserved coal mine that offers daily tours and a history lesson on coal mining in Appalachia. Tamarack Marketplace, a showcase of Appalachian arts and crafts, was built in 1996 at a cost of $10 million and dedicated to former Governor Gaston Caperton. The city also hosts the Youth Museum of Southern West Virginia, which includes a planetarium, boxcars and a homestead with a weaver's shed.

== Education ==
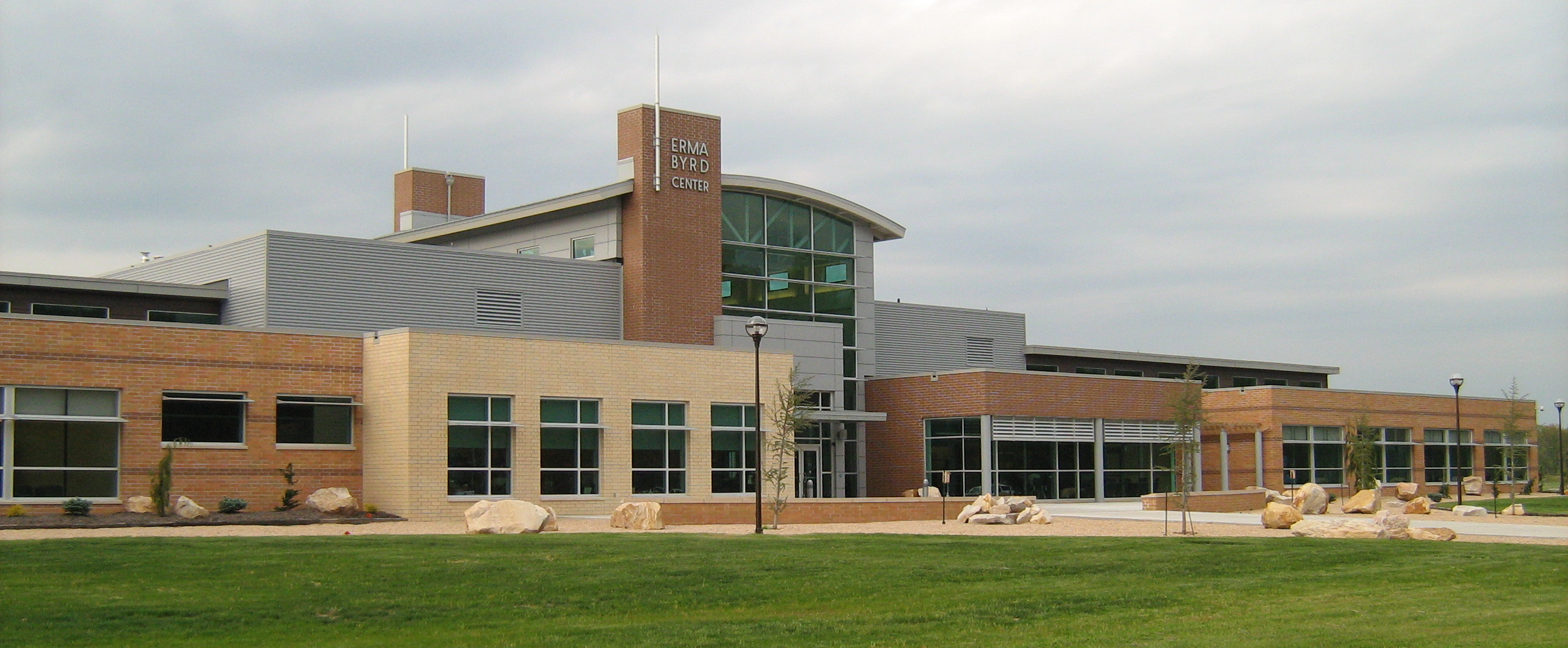
Erma Byrd Higher Education Center

Woodrow Wilson High School is Beckley's public high school.

Four universities are located in Beckley: West Virginia University Institute of Technology, University of Charleston-Beckley, and a branch campus of Concord University. Additionally, a branch campus of Valley College is located in Beckley; New River Community and Technical College is in the nearby community of Beaver; and the nonprofit, nondenominational Appalachian Bible College is located just outside the city limits, in nearby Bradley.

== Media ==
=== Newspaper ===
The Register Herald, a five-day morning daily newspaper, serves Beckley and the surrounding area. It had a circulation of 19,237 in 2016 and is owned by Community Newspaper Newspaper Holdings. The newspaper traces its history to The Raleigh Register, the Raleigh Herald, and the Beckley Evening Post which were among a dozen weekly and monthly publications published in and around Beckley as early as the 1880s.

=== Radio ===
Radio stations based in Beckley include West Virginia Public Broadcasting's WVBY public radio, WJLS (AM), a talk radio and country music station that was a CBS affiliate from 1943 to 1990, WJLS-FM, which syndicates country music, and WCIR-FM, a contemporary radio station based in Downtown Beckley.

=== Television ===
Beckley shares a media market with Bluefield and Oak Hill. Stations in this market include ABC affiliate WOAY-TV, NBC affiliate WVVA, and CBS/FOX affiliate WVNS-TV. Beckley is also served by West Virginia Public Broadcasting's station WSWP, which carries PBS programming.

== Transportation ==
The city is the regional hub for over 100,000 Southern West Virginia residents. It is the ninth-largest city in West Virginia, exceeded in population by Martinsburg and followed by Clarksburg.

=== Highways ===
- Interstate 64
- Interstate 77
- U.S. Highway 19
- U.S. Highway 121 (Partially Complete)
- West Virginia Route 3
- West Virginia Route 10
- West Virginia Route 16
- West Virginia Route 210

=== Rail ===
Amtrak serves the Beckley area at Prince Station in Prince, a stop on the Cardinal service between Chicago and Washington, D.C.

=== Air ===
Greater Beckley's only airport is Raleigh County Memorial Airport. Raleigh County Memorial Airport is served by Contour Airlines with service to Charlotte and Parkersburg.

== In popular culture ==
- Beckley is a location in Fallout 76.

== See also ==
- List of mayors of Beckley, West Virginia
