= Chester W. Nimitz =

American naval officer (1885–1966)

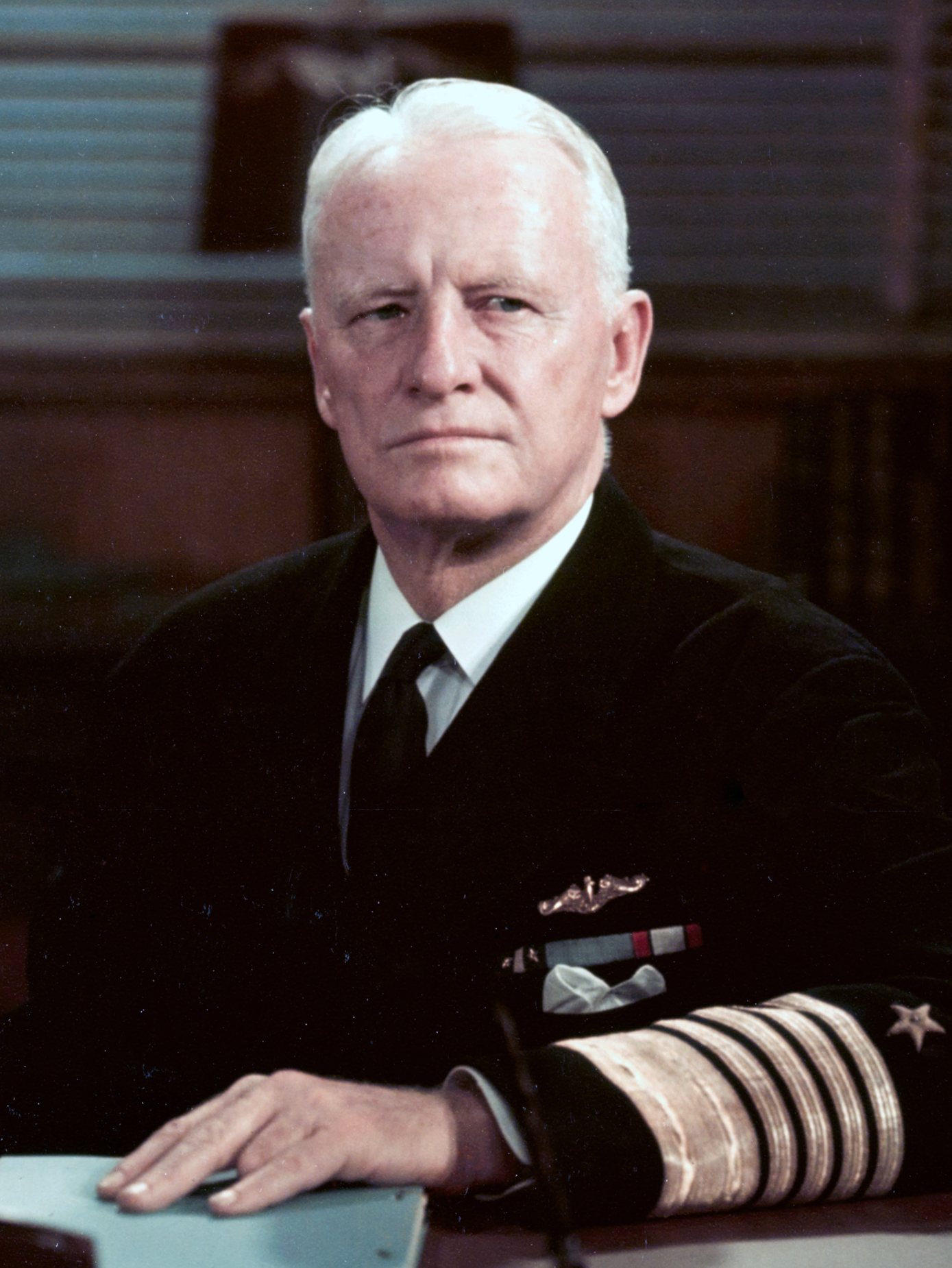
- Official portrait, c. 1945–47
- Born: 24 February 1885; Fredericksburg, Texas, U.S.
- Died: 20 February 1966 (aged 80); San Francisco, California, U.S.
- Burial place: Golden Gate National Cemetery; San Bruno, California, U.S.
- Education: United States Naval Academy
- Relatives: Charles Henry Nimitz (grandfather); Chester Nimitz Jr. (son)
- Military career
- Branch: United States Navy
- Service years: 1905–1966
- Rank: Fleet Admiral
- Service number: 5572
- Commands: Chief of Naval Operations; Pacific Ocean Areas; United States Pacific Fleet; Bureau of Navigation; USS Augusta (CA-31); USS Rigel (AR-11); USS Chicago (CA-14); Atlantic Submarine Flotilla; USS Skipjack (SS-24); 3rd Submarine Division Atlantic Torpedo Fleet; USS Narwhal (SS-17); USS Snapper (SS-16); USS Plunger (SS-2); First Submarine Flotilla; USS Decatur (DD-5)
- Conflicts: See list: Philippine–American War; World War I; World War II; Battle of the Coral Sea; Battle of Midway; Solomon Islands campaign; Battle of the Philippine Sea; Battle of Leyte Gulf; Battle of Iwo Jima; Battle of Okinawa
- Awards: Navy Distinguished Service Medal (4); Army Distinguished Service Medal; Silver Lifesaving Medal; Full list
- Other work: Regent of the University of California

Chester William Nimitz (/ˈnɪmɪts/; 24 February 1885 – 20 February 1966) was a fleet admiral in the United States Navy. He played a major role in the naval history of World War II as Commander in Chief, US Pacific Fleet, and Commander in Chief, Pacific Ocean Areas, commanding Allied air, land, and sea forces during World War II.

Nimitz was the leading U.S. Navy authority on submarines. Qualified in submarines during his early years, Nimitz later oversaw the conversion of these vessels' propulsion from gasoline to diesel, and then later was key in acquiring approval to build the world's first nuclear-powered submarine, USS Nautilus, whose propulsion system later completely superseded diesel-powered submarines in the United States. Beginning in 1917, Nimitz was the Navy's leading developer of underway replenishment techniques, the tool which during the Pacific war would allow the American fleet to operate away from port almost indefinitely. The chief of the Navy's Bureau of Navigation from 1939 to 1942, Nimitz served as the chief of naval operations from 1945 until 1947. He was the United States' last surviving officer who served in the rank of fleet admiral. The USS Nimitz supercarrier, the lead ship of her class, is named after Nimitz.

== Early life and education ==
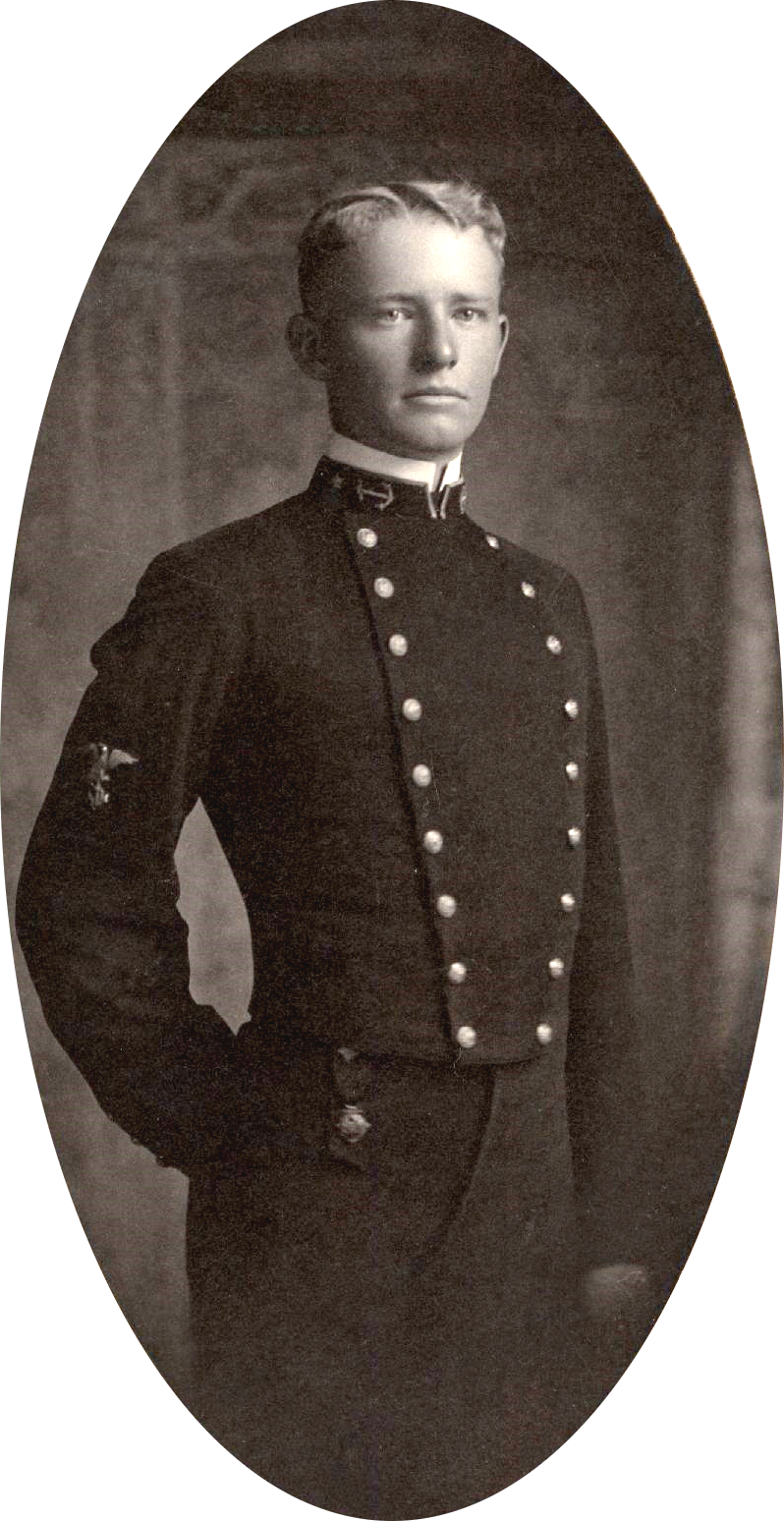
Midshipman 1/C Nimitz, circa 1905

Nimitz, a German Texan, was born the son of Anna Josephine (née Henke) and Chester Bernhard Nimitz on 24 February 1885, in Fredericksburg, Texas, where his grandfather's hotel is now the National Museum of the Pacific War. His frail, rheumatic father had died six months earlier, on 14 August 1884. In 1890, Anna married William Nimitz (1864–1943), Chester B. Nimitz's brother. He was significantly influenced by his German-born paternal grandfather, Charles Henry Nimitz, a former seaman in the German Merchant Marine, who taught Nimitz, "the sea – like life itself – is a stern taskmaster. The best way to get along with either is to learn all you can, then do your best and don't worry – especially about things over which you have no control". His grandfather had become a Texas Ranger in the Texas Mounted Volunteers in 1851 and later served as captain of the Gillespie Rifles Company in the Confederate States Army during the Civil War.

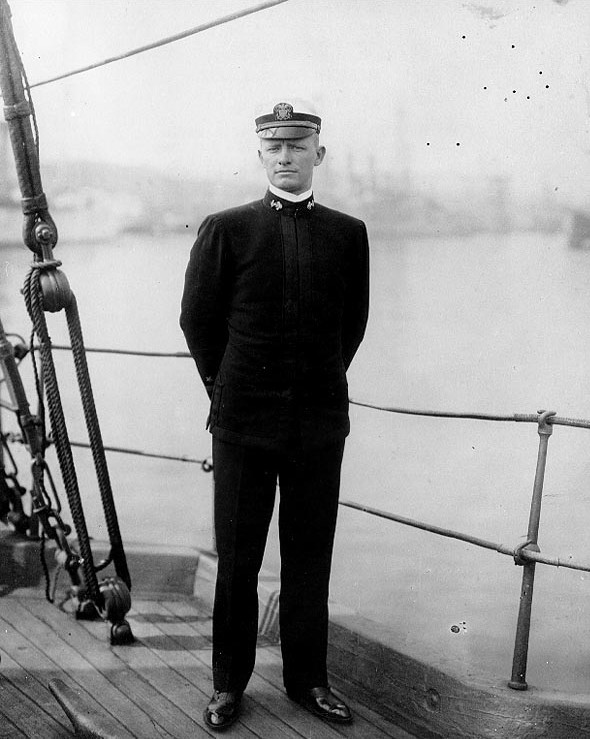
Ensign Chester Nimitz

Originally, Nimitz applied to West Point in hopes of becoming an Army officer, but no appointments were available. James L. Slayden, US Representative for Texas's 12th congressional district, told Nimitz that he had one appointment available for the United States Naval Academy and that he would award it to the best-qualified candidate. Nimitz felt that this was his only opportunity for further education and spent extra time studying to earn the appointment. Nimitz was appointed to the Naval Academy by Slayden in 1901, and graduated with distinction on 30 January 1905, seventh in a class of 114.

== Military career ==
=== Early career ===
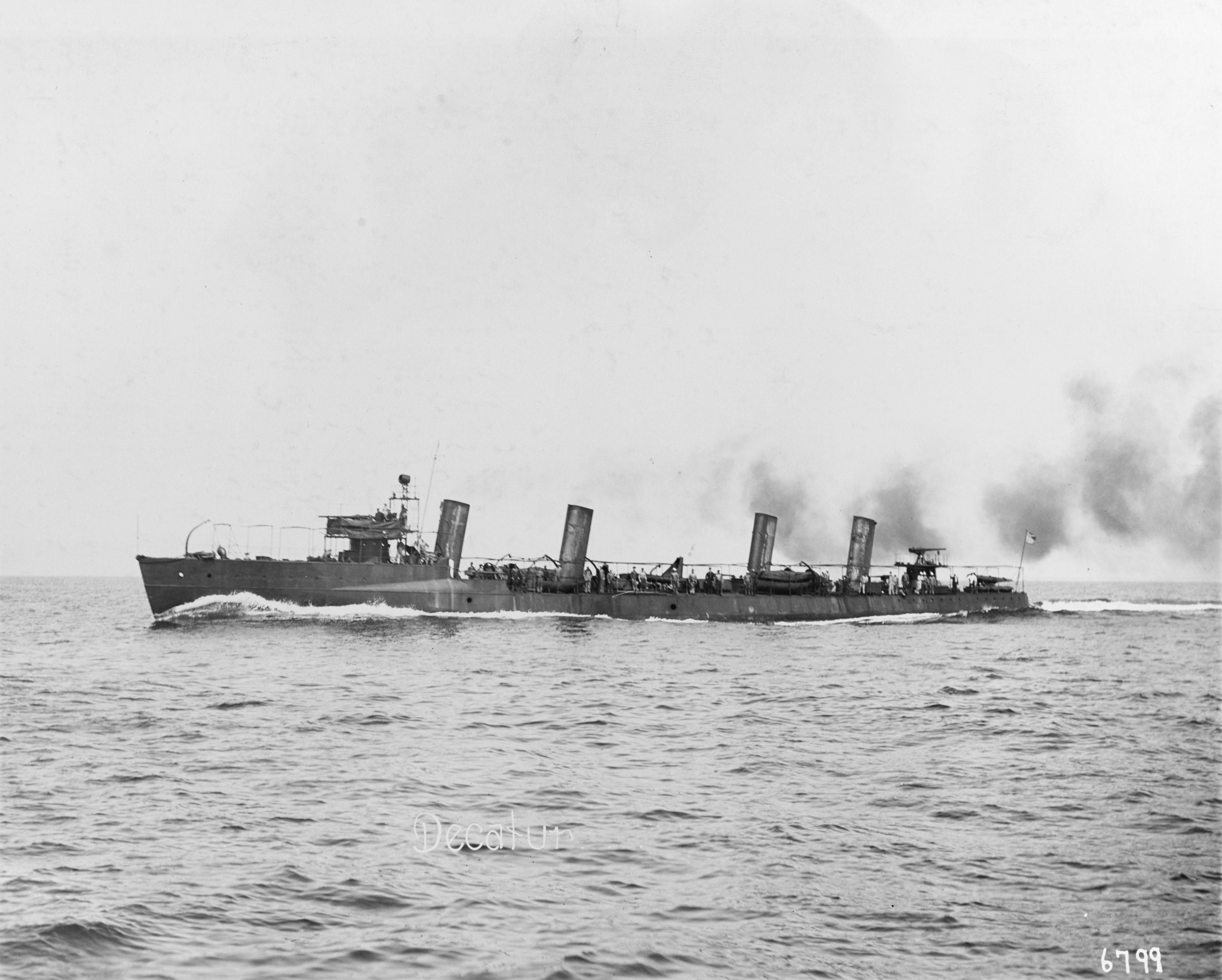
USS Decatur, 1902

Nimitz joined the battleship USS Ohio (BB-12) in San Francisco, and cruised on her to the Far East. In September 1906, he was transferred to the cruiser Baltimore; on 31 January 1907, after the two years at sea as a warrant officer then required by law, Nimitz was commissioned as an ensign. Remaining on Asiatic Station in 1907, he successively served on the gunboat Panay, destroyer Decatur, and cruiser Denver.

The destroyer Decatur ran aground on a mud bank in the Philippines on 7 July 1908, while under the command of Ensign Nimitz. The incident was the result of a navigational error. Nimitz had failed to check the harbor's tide tables and tried Batangas' harbor when the water level was low, leaving Decatur stuck until the tide rose again the next morning, and she was pulled free by a small steamer. Following the grounding, a naval board of inquiry was convened to investigate the circumstances. The board found that Nimitz had indeed made an error in judgment, and he received a letter of reprimand.

Nimitz returned to the United States on board USS Ranger when that vessel was converted to a school ship, and in January 1909, began instruction in the First Submarine Flotilla. In May of that year, he was given command of the flotilla, with additional duty in command of USS Plunger, later renamed A-1. Nimitz was promoted directly from ensign to lieutenant in January 1910. He commanded USS Snapper (later renamed C-5) when that submarine was commissioned on 2 February 1910, and on 18 November 1910, assumed command of USS Narwhal (later renamed D-1).

In the latter command, Nimitz had additional duty on 10 October 1911, as Commander 3rd Submarine Division Atlantic Torpedo Fleet. In November 1911, he was ordered to the Boston Navy Yard, to assist in fitting out USS Skipjack and assumed command of that submarine, which had been renamed E-1, at her commissioning on 14 February 1912. On the monitor Tonopah (then employed as a submarine tender) on 20 March 1912, Nimitz rescued Fireman Second Class W. J. Walsh from drowning, receiving a Silver Lifesaving Medal for his action.

After commanding the Atlantic Submarine Flotilla from May 1912 to March 1913, Nimitz supervised the building of diesel engines for the fleet oil tanker Maumee, under construction at the New London Ship and Engine Company, Groton, Connecticut.

=== World War I ===
In the summer of 1913, Nimitz (who spoke fluent German) studied engines at the Maschinenfabrik-Augsburg-Nürnberg (M.A.N.) diesel engine plants in Nuremberg, Germany, and Ghent, Belgium. Returning to the New York Navy Yard, he became executive and engineer officer of Maumee at her commissioning on 23 October 1916.

After the United States declared war on Germany in April 1917, Nimitz was chief engineer of Maumee while the vessel served as a refueling ship for the first squadron of US Navy destroyers to cross the Atlantic, to take part in the war. Under his supervision, Maumee conducted the first-ever underway refuelings. On 10 August 1917, Nimitz became aide to Rear Admiral Samuel S. Robison, Commander, Submarine Force, US Atlantic Fleet (ComSubLant).

On 6 February 1918, Nimitz was appointed chief of staff and was awarded a Letter of Commendation for meritorious service as COMSUBLANT's chief of staff. On 16 September, he reported to the office of the Chief of Naval Operations, and on 25 October, was given additional duty as senior member, Board of Submarine Design.

=== Interwar Period ===
From May 1919 to June 1920, Nimitz served as executive officer of the battleship South Carolina. He then commanded the cruiser Chicago with additional duty in command of Submarine Division 14, based at Pearl Harbor, Hawaii. Nimitz, assisted by four earnest Chief Petty Officers, supervised the construction of Submarine Base Pearl Harbor on a triangle-shaped, overgrown piece of land at the juncture of Southeast Loch and Quarry Loch, and served as the base's first commanding officer. During this tour, he also conducted an investigation into the R-14 sailing incident. Nimitz's handling of the disciplinary action in the aftermath of the investigation was considered a model of even-handed fairness, cementing his reputation as a solid and capable leader. Returning to the mainland in the summer of 1922, Nimitz studied at the Naval War College, Newport, Rhode Island.

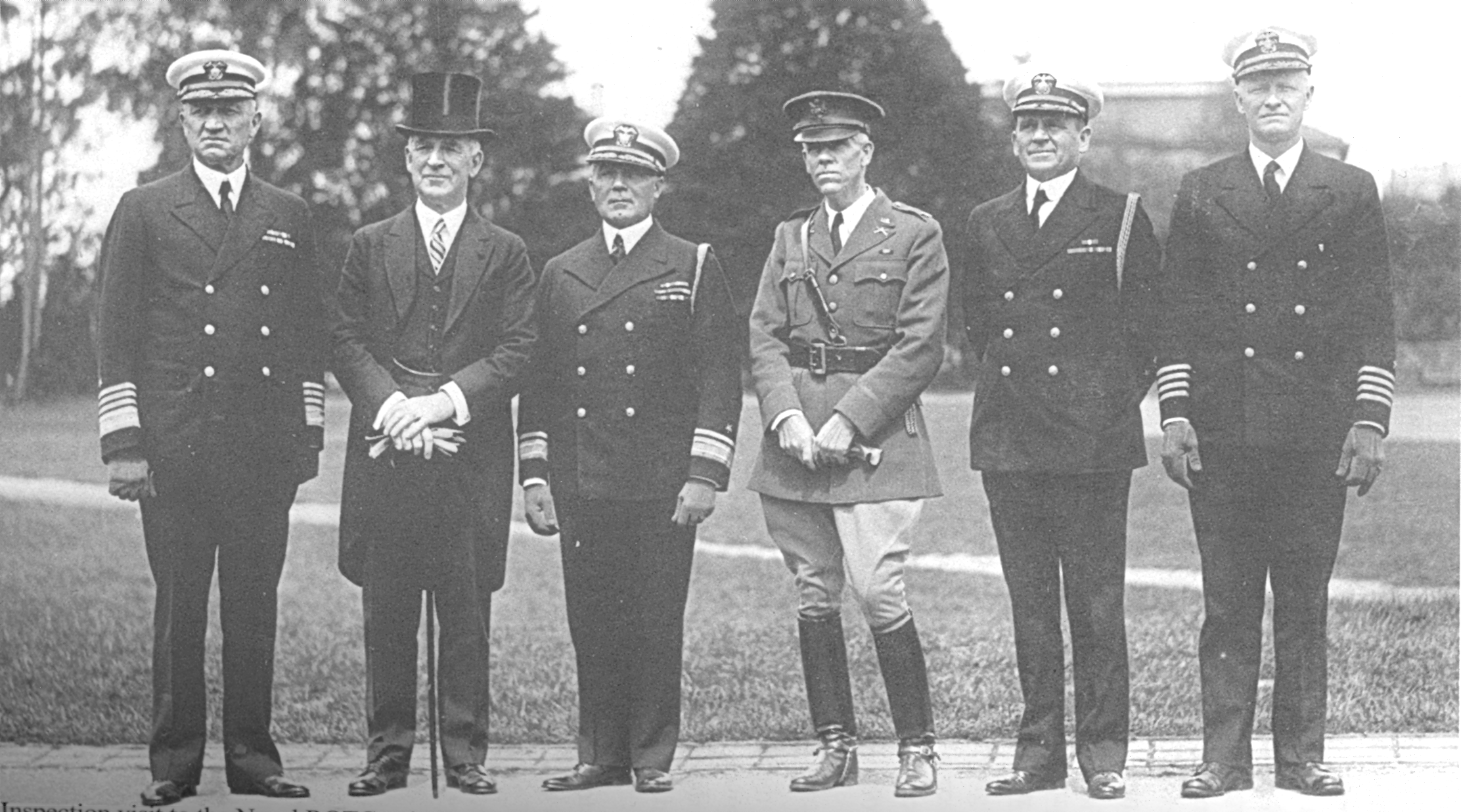
Inspection visit to Naval ROTC Unit at U.C. Berkeley in 1927. ADM Louis R. de Steiguer, Commander in Chief, Battle Fleet; William Wallace Campbell, President, U.C. Berkeley; RADM Harris Laning, Chief of Staff, Battle Fleet; COL Robert O. Van Horn, Army ROTC Unit; CAPT William D. Puleston, Asst Chief of Staff, Battle Fleet; CAPT Chester Nimitz, Naval ROTC Unit

In June 1923, Nimitz became aide and assistant chief of staff to the Commander, Battle Fleet, and later to the Commander in Chief, United States Fleet. In August 1926, he went to the University of California, Berkeley, where he established one of the first Naval Reserve Officer Training Corps units and successfully advocated for the program's expansion.

Nimitz lost part of his left ring finger in an accident with a diesel engine, saving the rest of it only when the machine briefly jammed against his Annapolis ring.

In June 1929, Nimitz took command of Submarine Division 20. In June 1931, he assumed command of the destroyer tender Rigel and the destroyers out of commission at San Diego, California. In October 1933, Nimitz took command of the cruiser Augusta and deployed to the Far East, where in December, Augusta became the flagship of the Asiatic Fleet. While in command of the Augusta, his legal aide was Chesty Puller.

In April 1935, Nimitz returned home for three years as assistant chief of the Bureau of Navigation, before becoming commander, Cruiser Division 2, Battle Force. In September 1938, Nimitz took command of Battleship Division 1, Battle Force. During this time, he conducted experiments in the underway refueling of large ships which would prove a key element in the Navy's success in the war to come. "Tests were planned for the spring of 1939 [June 1939] using elements of the fleet left on the West Coast while the rest of the fleet was in the Caribbean participating in Fleet Problem XX. Nimitz was scheduled to remain on the West Coast aboard his flagship the Arizona. The aircraft carrier Saratoga, the heavy cruisers Chester and Vincennes, and the light cruiser Trenton would also be left behind. These ships, with their escorts and at least one oiler, would constitute Task Force 7. Nimitz, as senior officer present, would be in command."

On 15 June 1939, Nimitz was appointed chief of the Bureau of Navigation. From 1940 to 1941, he served as president of the Army Navy Country Club, in Arlington, Virginia.

=== World War II ===
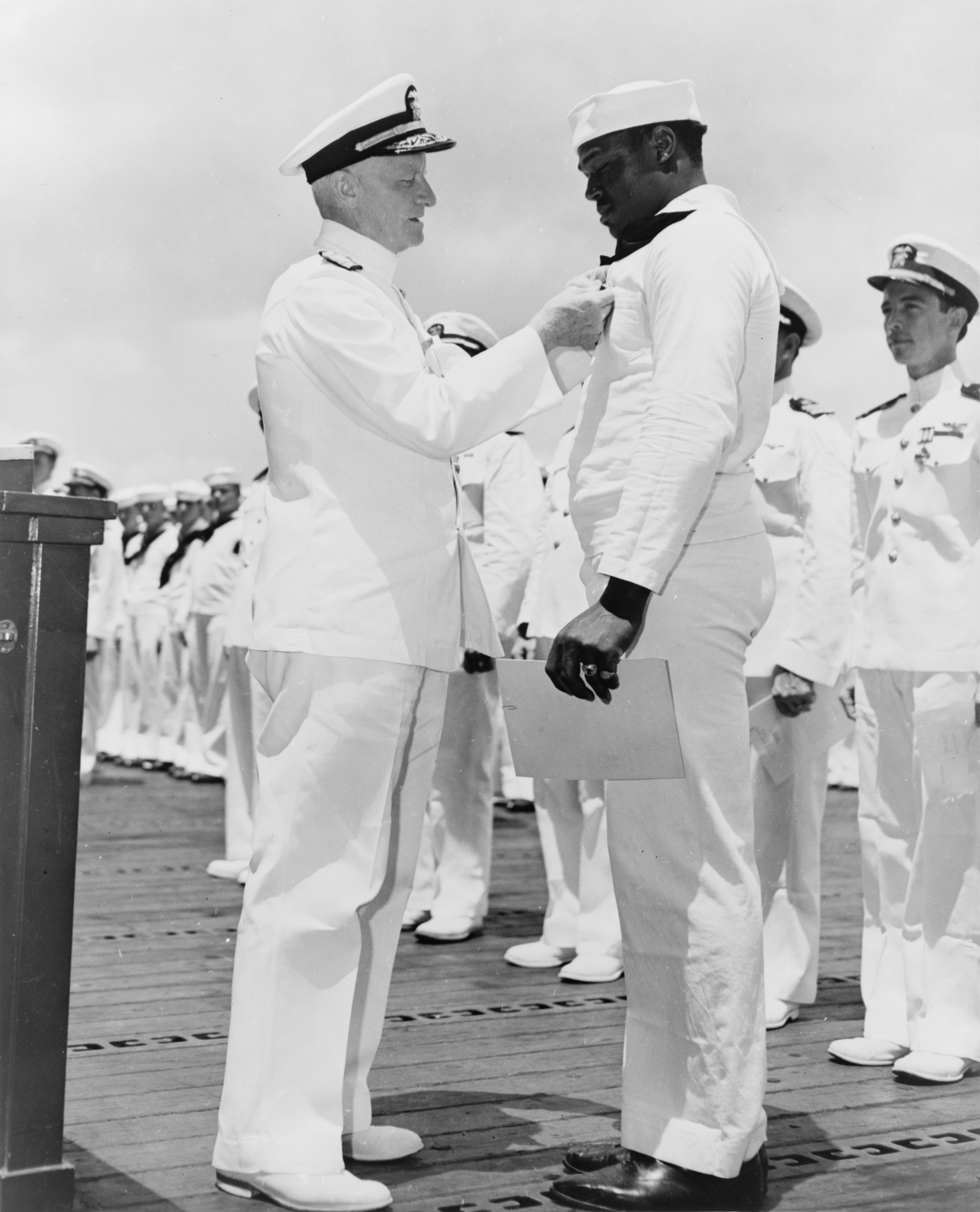
Admiral Chester W. Nimitz (left) pins the Navy Cross on Doris "Dorie" Miller in a ceremony onboard USS Enterprise in May 1942

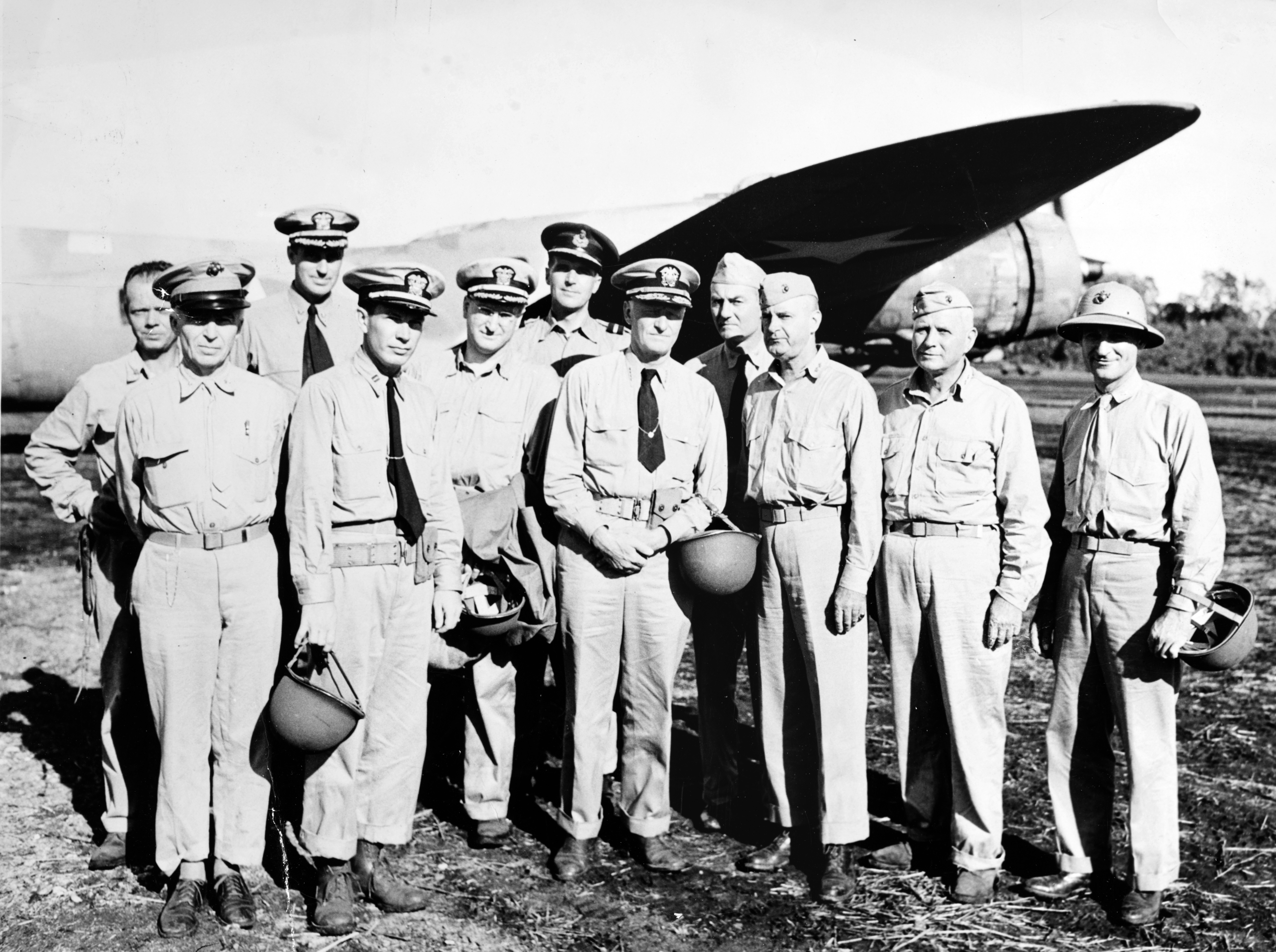
Nimitz with officers at Henderson Field, Guadalcanal, 30 September 1942

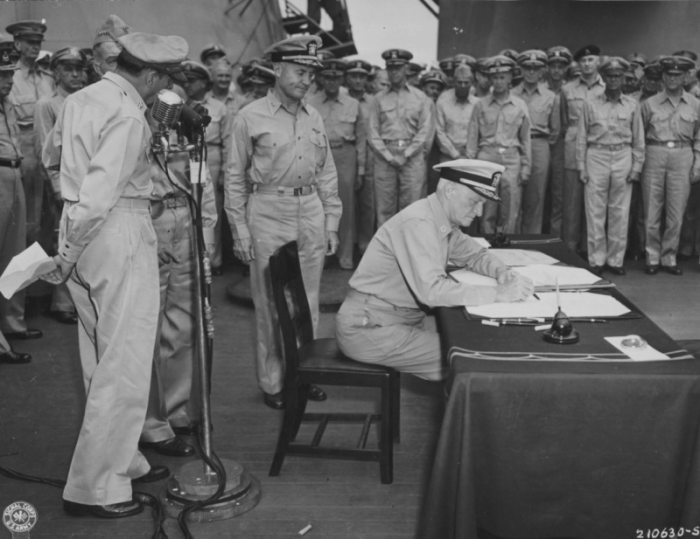
The surrender of Japan aboard USS Missouri in Tokyo Bay in September 1945: Fleet Admiral Chester Nimitz, representing the United States, signs the instrument of surrender.

Ten days after the attack on Pearl Harbor on 7 December 1941, Rear Admiral Nimitz was selected by President Franklin D. Roosevelt to be the commander-in-chief of the United States Pacific Fleet (CINCPACFLT). Nimitz immediately departed Washington for Hawaii and took command in a ceremony on the top deck of the submarine Grayling. He was promoted to the rank of admiral, effective 31 December 1941, upon assuming command. The change of command ceremony would normally have taken place aboard a battleship, but every battleship in Pearl Harbor had been either sunk or damaged during the attack. Assuming command at the most critical period of the war in the Pacific, Admiral Nimitz organized his forces to halt the Japanese advance, despite the shortage of ships, planes, and supplies. Nimitz had a significant advantage in that the United States had cracked the Japanese diplomatic code and had made progress on the naval code JN-25. The Japanese had kept radio silence before the attack on Pearl Harbor, although events were then moving so rapidly that they had to rely on coded radio messages they did not realize were being read in Hawaii.

On 24 March 1942, the newly formed US-British Combined Chiefs of Staff issued a directive designating the Pacific theater an area of American strategic responsibility. Six days later, the US Joint Chiefs of Staff (JCS) divided the theater into three areas: the Pacific Ocean Areas, the Southwest Pacific Area (commanded by General Douglas MacArthur), and the Southeast Pacific Area. The JCS designated Nimitz as "Commander in Chief, Pacific Ocean Areas", with operational control over all Allied units (air, land, and sea) in that area.

Nimitz, in Hawaii, and his superior Admiral Ernest King, the Chief of Naval Operations, in Washington, rejected the plan of General Douglas MacArthur to advance on Japan through New Guinea and the Philippines and Formosa. Instead, they proposed an island-hopping plan that would allow them to bypass most of the Japanese strength in the Central Pacific until they reached Okinawa. President Roosevelt compromised, giving both MacArthur and Nimitz their own theaters. The two Pacific theaters were favored, to the dismay of generals George Marshall and Dwight Eisenhower, who favored a Germany-first strategy. King and Nimitz provided MacArthur with some naval forces but kept most of the carriers. However, when the time came to plan an invasion of Japan, MacArthur was given overall command.

Nimitz faced superior Japanese forces at the crucial defensive actions of the Battle of the Coral Sea and the Battle of Midway. The Battle of the Coral Sea, while a loss in terms of total damage suffered, has been described as resulting in the strategic success of turning back an apparent Japanese invasion of Port Moresby on the island of New Guinea. Two Japanese carriers were temporarily taken out of action in the battle, which would deprive the Japanese of their use in the Midway operation that shortly followed. The Navy's intelligence team reasoned that the Japanese would be attacking Midway, so Nimitz moved all his available forces to the defense. The severe losses in Japanese carriers at Midway affected the balance of naval air power during the remainder of 1942 and were crucial in neutralizing Japanese offensive threats in the South Pacific. Naval engagements during the Battle of Guadalcanal left both forces severely depleted. However, with the allied advantage in land-based air-power, the results were sufficient to secure Guadalcanal. The US and allied forces then undertook to neutralize remaining Japanese offensive threats with the Solomon Islands campaign and the New Guinea campaign, while building capabilities for major fleet actions. In 1943, Midway became a forward submarine base, greatly enhancing US capabilities against Japanese shipping.

In terms of combat, 1943 was a relatively quiet year, but it proved decisive inasmuch as Nimitz gained the materiel and manpower needed to launch major fleet offensives to destroy Japanese power in the central Pacific region. This drive opened with the Gilbert and Marshall Islands campaign from November 1943 to February 1944, followed by the destruction of the strategic Japanese base at Truk Lagoon, and the Marianas campaign that brought the Japanese homeland within range of new strategic bombers. Nimitz's forces inflicted a decisive defeat on the Japanese fleet in the Battle of the Philippine Sea (19–20 June 1944), which allowed the capture of Saipan, Guam, and Tinian. His Fleet Forces isolated enemy-held bastions on the central and eastern Caroline Islands and secured in quick succession Peleliu, Angaur, and Ulithi. In the Philippines, his ships destroyed much of the remaining Japanese naval power at the Battle of Leyte Gulf, that lasted from 24 to 26 October 1944. With the loss of the Philippines, Japan's energy supply routes from Indonesia came under direct threat, crippling their war effort.

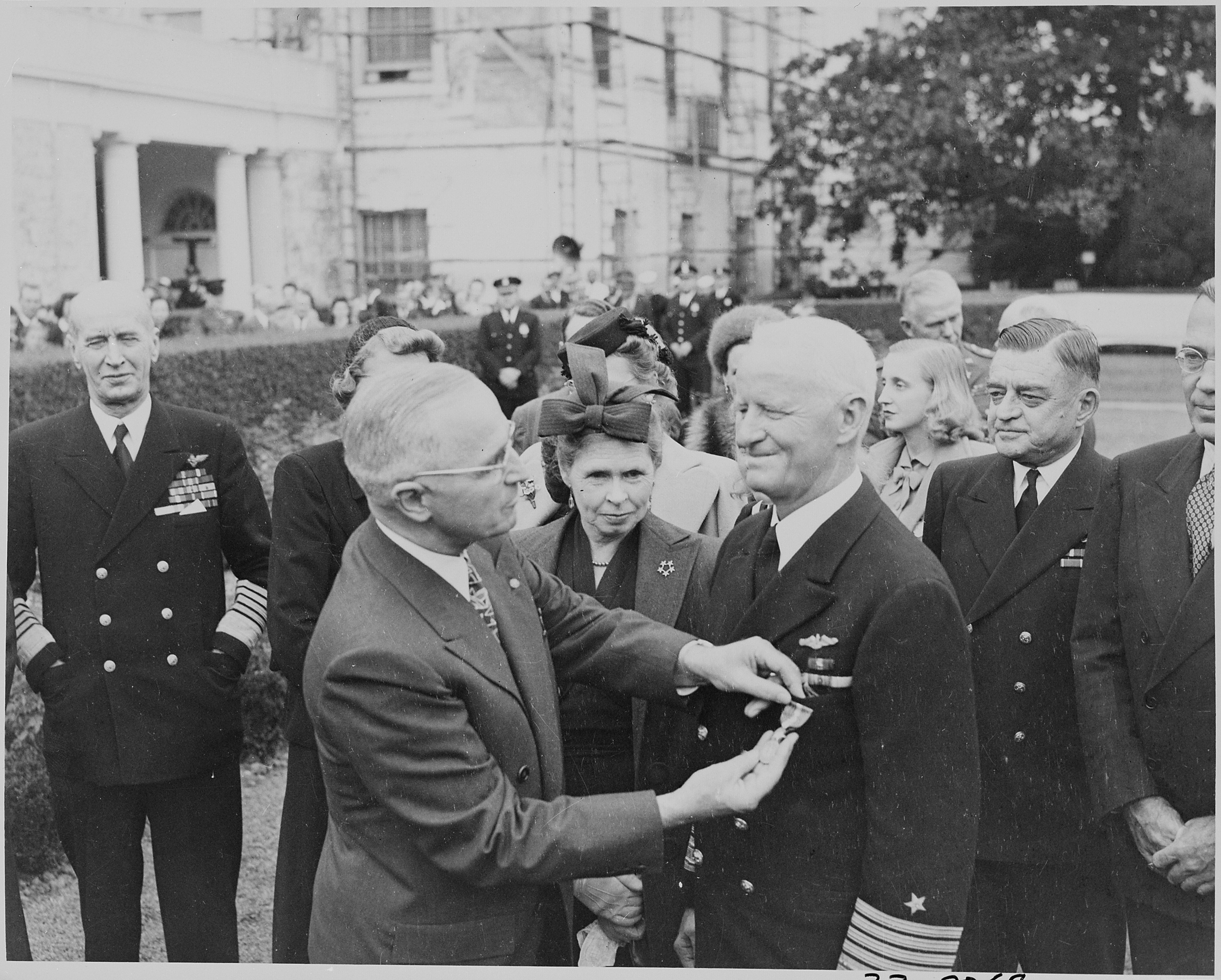
President Harry Truman decorating Admiral Nimitz with a Gold Star on 5 October 1945

By act of Congress, passed on 14 December 1944, the rank of fleet admiral – the highest rank in the Navy – was established. The next day, President Franklin Roosevelt appointed Nimitz to that rank. Nimitz took the oath of that office on 19 December. In January 1945, Nimitz moved the headquarters of the Pacific Fleet forward from Pearl Harbor to Guam for the remainder of the war. Nimitz's wife remained in the continental United States for the duration of the war and did not join her husband in Hawaii or Guam. In 1945, Nimitz's forces launched successful amphibious assaults on Iwo Jima and Okinawa and his carriers raided the home waters of Japan. In addition, Nimitz also arranged for the Army Air Force to mine the Japanese ports and waterways by air with B-29 Superfortresses in a successful mission called Operation Starvation, which severely interrupted Japanese logistics.

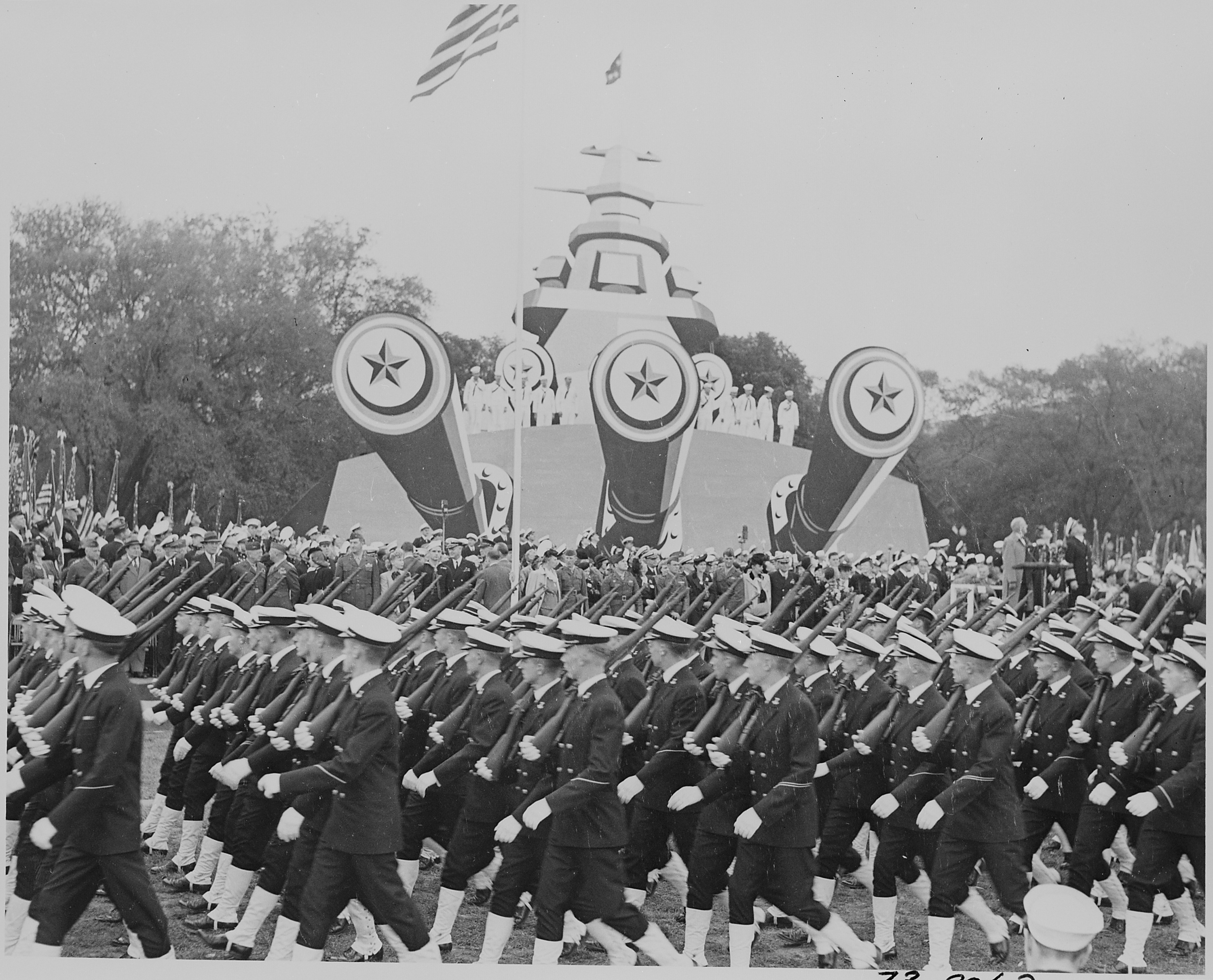
Troops marching at ceremonies honoring Nimitz

On 2 September 1945, Nimitz signed as representative of the United States when Japan formally surrendered on board USS Missouri in Tokyo Bay. On 5 October 1945, which had been officially designated as "Nimitz Day" in Washington, D.C., Nimitz was personally presented a second Gold Star for the third award of the Navy Distinguished Service Medal by President Harry S. Truman "for exceptionally meritorious service as Commander in Chief, U.S. Pacific Fleet and Pacific Ocean Areas, from June 1944 to August 1945".

=== Post war ===
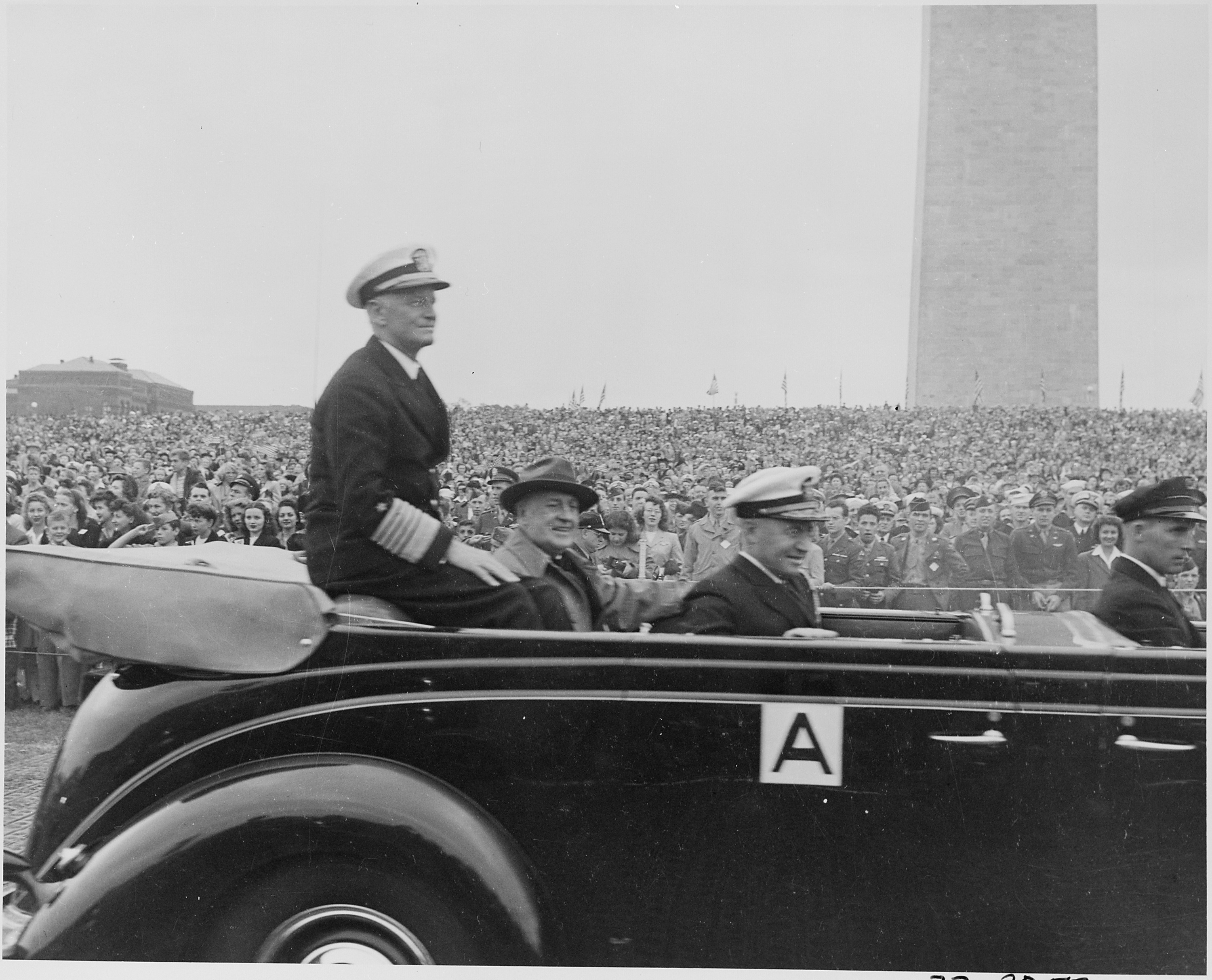
Nimitz in Washington, D.C. in 1945

On 26 November 1945, Nimitz's nomination as Chief of Naval Operations (CNO) was confirmed by the US Senate, and on 15 December, he relieved Fleet Admiral Ernest J. King. Nimitz had assured the President that he was willing to serve as the CNO for one two-year term, but no longer. Nimitz tackled the difficult task of reducing the most powerful navy in the world to a fraction of its war-time strength while establishing and overseeing active and reserve fleets with the strength and readiness required to support national policy.

For the postwar trial of German Grand Admiral Karl Dönitz at the Nuremberg Trials in 1946, Nimitz furnished an affidavit in support of the practice of unrestricted submarine warfare, a practice that he himself had employed throughout the war in the Pacific. This evidence is widely credited as a reason why Dönitz was sentenced to only 10 years of imprisonment.

Nimitz endorsed an entirely new course for the US Navy's future by way of supporting then-Captain Hyman G. Rickover's chain-of-command-circumventing proposal in 1947 to build USS Nautilus, the world's first nuclear-powered vessel. As is noted at a display at the Nimitz Museum in Fredericksburg, Texas: "Nimitz's greatest legacy as CNO is arguably his support of Admiral Hyman Rickover's effort to convert the submarine fleet from diesel to nuclear propulsion".

=== Inactive duty as a fleet admiral ===
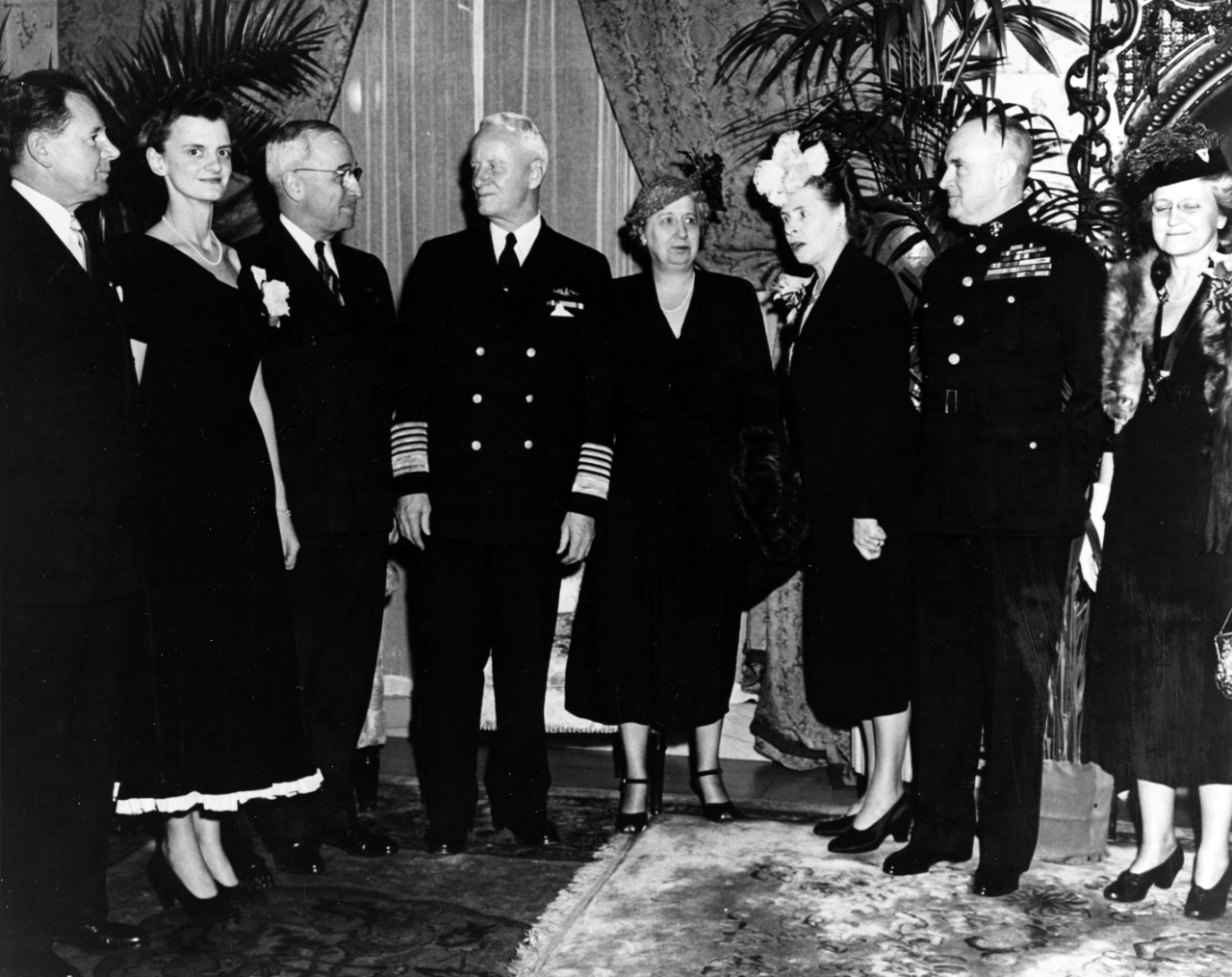
Secretary of Navy John L. Sullivan's farewell party for Fleet Admiral USN (CNO) and General A.A. Vandegrift, USMC (CMC), on their retirement (December 1947)

Nimitz retired from office as CNO on 15 December 1947, and received a third Gold Star in lieu of a fourth Navy Distinguished Service Medal. However, since the rank of fleet admiral is a lifetime appointment, he remained on active duty for the rest of his life, with full pay and benefits. Nimitz and his wife, Catherine, moved to Berkeley, California. After suffering a serious fall in 1964, he and Catherine moved to US Naval quarters on Yerba Buena Island in the San Francisco Bay.

In San Francisco, Nimitz served in the mostly ceremonial post as a special assistant to the Secretary of the Navy in the Western Sea Frontier. He worked to help restore goodwill with Japan after World War II by helping to raise funds for the restoration of the Japanese Imperial Navy battleship Mikasa, Admiral Heihachiro Togo's flagship at the Battle of Tsushima in 1905.

From 1949 to 1953, Nimitz served as UN-appointed plebiscite administrator for Jammu and Kashmir. His proposed role as administrator was accepted by Pakistan but rejected by India.

Nimitz became a member of the Bohemian Club of San Francisco. In 1948, he sponsored a Bohemian dinner in honor of US Army General Mark Clark, known for his campaigns in North Africa and Italy.

Nimitz served as a regent of the University of California from 1948 to 1956, where he had formerly been a faculty member as a professor of naval science for the Naval Reserve Officer Training Corps program. Nimitz was honored on 17 October 1964, by the University of California on Nimitz Day.

== Personal life ==
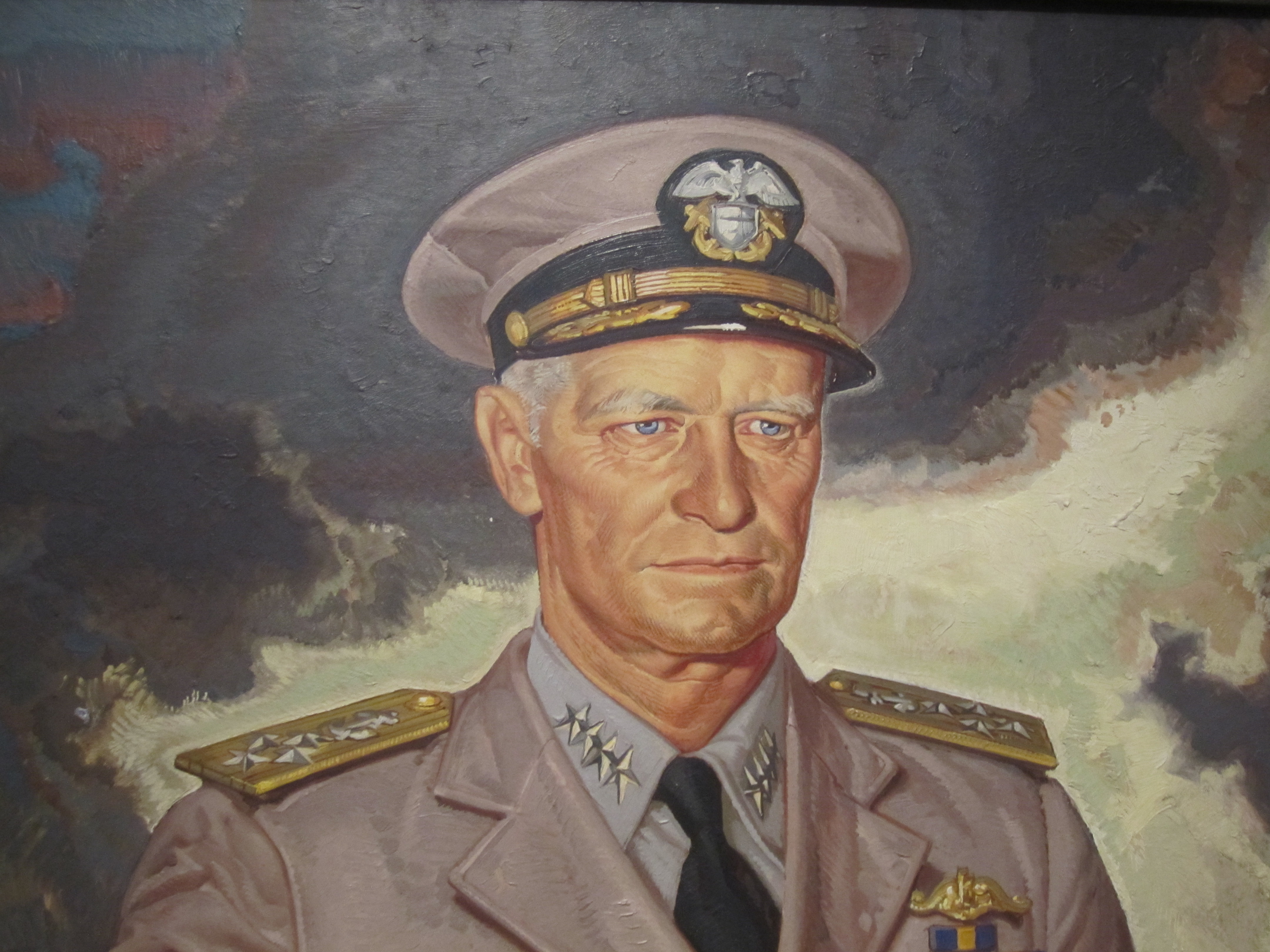
Nimitz as he appears at the National Portrait Gallery in Washington, D.C.

Nimitz married Catherine Vance Freeman (22 March 1892 – 1 February 1979) on 9 April 1913, in Wollaston, Massachusetts. They had four children together: Catherine Vance "Kate", Chester William "Chet" Jr., Anna Elizabeth "Nancy", and Mary Manson.

Kate graduated from the University of California, Berkeley, in 1934, became a music librarian with the Washington D.C. Public Library, and married US Navy Commander James Thomas Lay (1909–2001), from St. Clair, Missouri, in Chester and Catherine's suite at the Fairfax Hotel in Washington, D.C., on 9 March 1945. She had met Lay in the summer of 1934 while visiting her parents in Southeast Asia.

Chet graduated from the US Naval Academy in 1936 and served as a submariner in the Navy until his retirement in 1957, reaching the (post-retirement) rank of rear admiral; he served as chairman of PerkinElmer from 1969 to 1980.

Nancy was an expert on the Soviet economy at the RAND Corporation from 1952 until her retirement in the 1980s.

Mary joined the Dominican Sisters of San Rafael, working at the Dominican University of California. She taught biology for 16 years and was academic dean for 11 years, acting president for a year, and vice president for institutional research for 13 years before becoming the university's emergency preparedness coordinator. She held this job until her death, due to cancer, on 27 February 2006.

== Death ==
In late 1965, Nimitz suffered a stroke, complicated by pneumonia. In January 1966, he left the US Naval Hospital (Oak Knoll) in Oakland to return home to his naval quarters. Nimitz died at home on the evening of 20 February at Quarters One on Yerba Buena Island in San Francisco Bay. His funeral on 24 February – what would have been his 81st birthday – was at the chapel of adjacent Naval Station Treasure Island, and Nimitz was buried with full military honors at Golden Gate National Cemetery in San Bruno. He lies alongside his wife and his lifelong friends Admiral Raymond A. Spruance, Admiral Richmond K. Turner, and Admiral Charles A. Lockwood and their wives, an arrangement made by all of them while living.

== Dates of rank ==
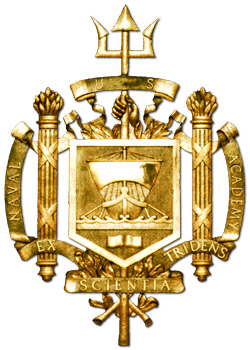
United States Naval Academy Midshipman – January 1905

Ensign	Lieutenant junior grade	Lieutenant	Lieutenant commander	Commander	Captain
O-1	O-2	O-3	O-4	O-5	O-6
7 January 1907	Never held	31 January 1910	29 August 1916	1 February 1918	2 June 1927

Commodore	Rear admiral	Vice admiral	Admiral	Fleet admiral
O-7	O-8	O-9	O-10	Special Grade
Never held	23 June 1938	Never held	31 December 1941	19 December 1944

- Nimitz never held the rank of lieutenant junior grade, as he was appointed a full lieutenant after three years of service as an ensign. For administrative reasons, Nimitz's naval record states that he was promoted to the rank of lieutenant junior grade and lieutenant on the same day.
- Nimitz was promoted directly from captain to rear admiral. During Nimitz's service, there was only one rank of rear admiral, without the later distinction between upper and lower half, nor did the rank of commodore exist when Nimitz was at that stage of his career.
- By presidential appointment, he skipped the rank of vice admiral and became an admiral in December 1941.
- Nimitz's rank of fleet admiral was made permanent in the United States Navy on 13 May 1946, a lifetime appointment.

== Decorations and awards ==
=== United States awards ===
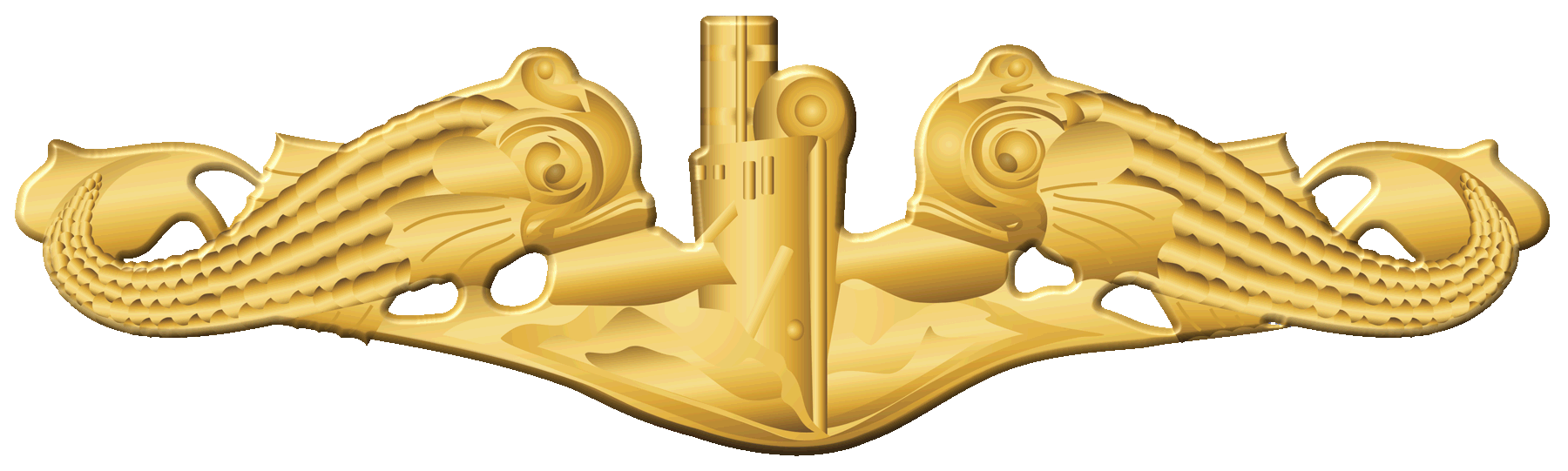
Submarine Warfare insignia
Medal of Honor
Navy Distinguished Service Medal with three gold stars
Army Distinguished Service Medal
Silver Lifesaving Medal
World War I Victory Medal with Secretary of the Navy Commendation Star
American Defense Service Medal
Asiatic-Pacific Campaign Medal
World War II Victory Medal
National Defense Service Medal with service star

=== Foreign awards ===
==== Orders ====
United Kingdom – Knight Grand Cross of the Order of the Bath
France – Grand Officer of the Legion of Honour (French: Grand-Officier de la Légion d'honneur)
Netherlands – Knight Grand Cross of the Order of Orange-Nassau with Swords (Dutch: Ridder Grootkruis in de Orde van Oranje Nassau)
Greece – Grand Cross of the Order of George I
China – Grand Cordon of Pao Ting (Tripod) Special Class
Guatemala – Cross of Military Merit First Class (Spanish: La Cruz del Merito Militar de Primera Clase)
Cuba – Grand Cross of the Order of Carlos Manuel de Céspedes (Spanish: Gran Cruz de la Orden de Carlos Manuel de Céspedes)
Argentina – Order of the Liberator General San Martín (Spanish: Orden del Libertador San Martin)
Ecuador – Order of Abdon Calderon (1st Class)
Belgium – Grand Cross of the Order of the Crown with Palm (French: Grand Croix de l'ordre de la Couronne avec palme)
Italy – Knight of the Grand Cross of the Military Order of Italy (Italian: Cavaliere di Gran Croce)
Brazil – Order of Naval Merit (Portuguese: Ordem do Mérito Naval)

==== Decorations ====
Philippines – Philippine Medal of Valor (Filipino: Medalya ng Kagitingan)
Belgium – War Cross with Palm (French: Croix de Guerre Avec Palme)

==== Service medals ====
United Kingdom – Pacific Star
Philippines – Liberation Medal with one bronze service star

== Memorials and legacy ==
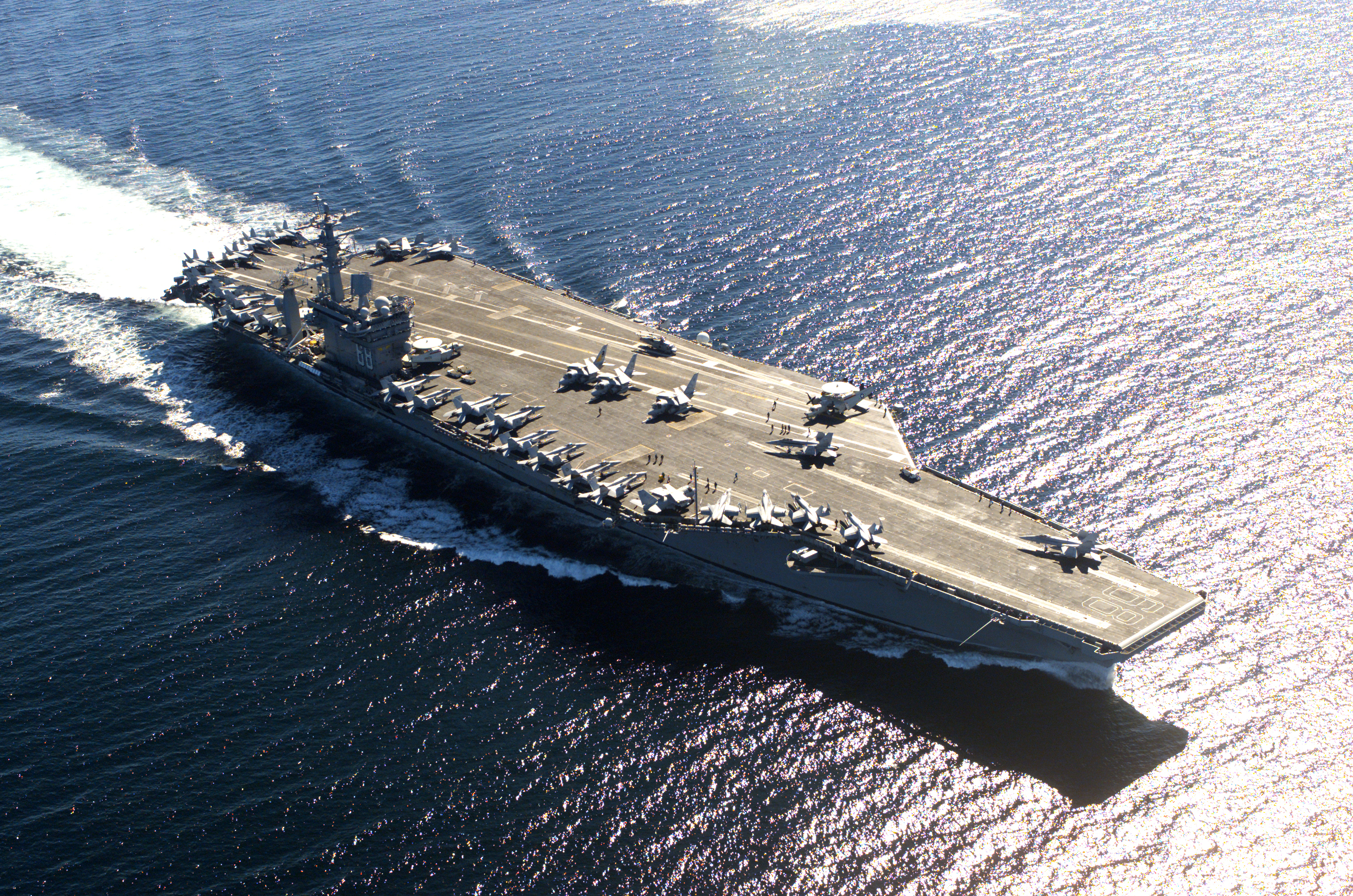
USS Nimitz at sea near Victoria, British Columbia

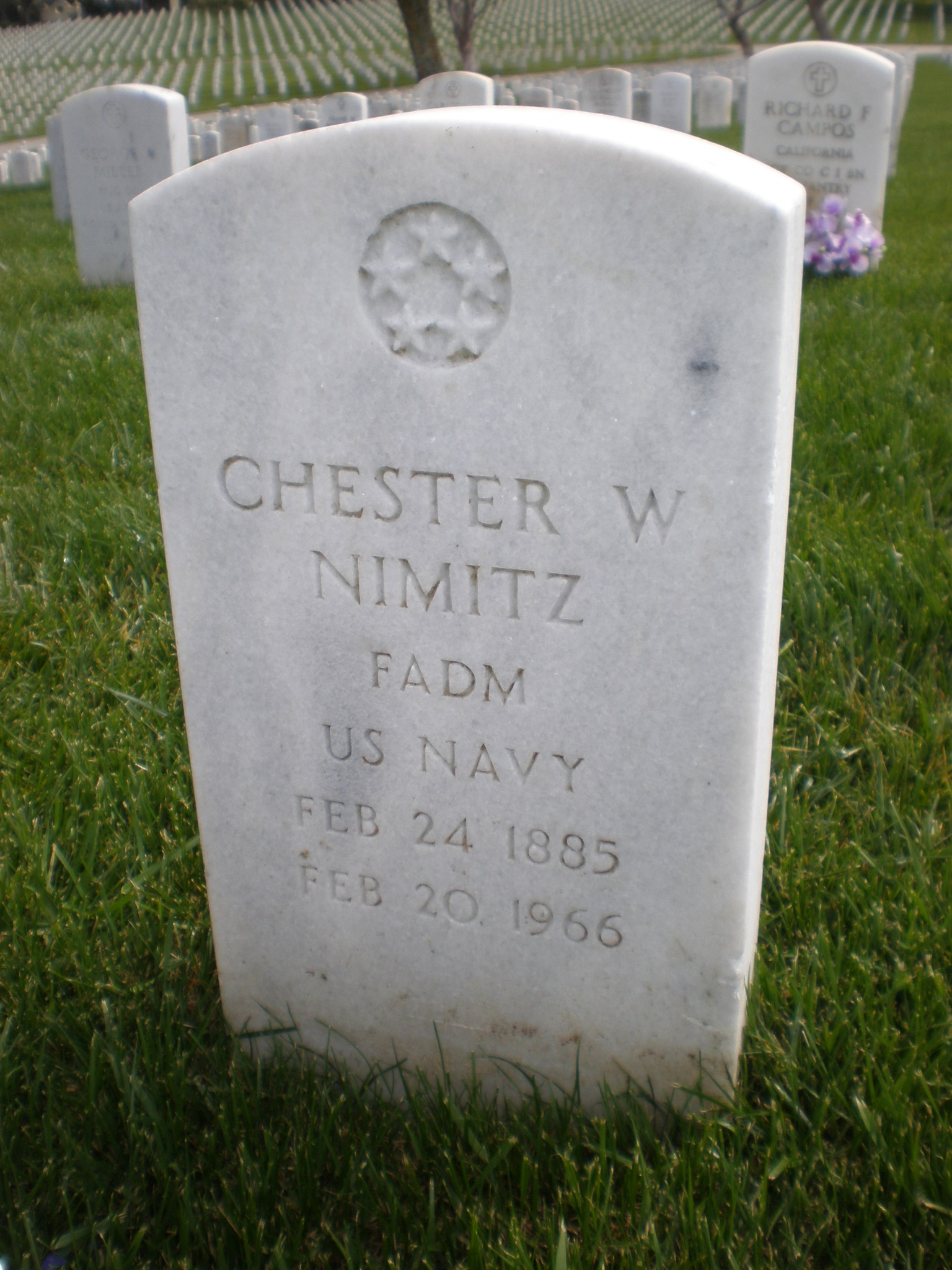
Nimitz's headstone at Golden Gate National Cemetery

Besides the honor of a United States Great Americans series 50¢ postage stamp, the following institutions and locations have been named in honor of Nimitz:

- USS Nimitz, the first of her class of ten nuclear-powered supercarriers, which was commissioned in 1975 and remains in service
- Nimitz Foundation, established in 1970, which funds the National Museum of the Pacific War and the Admiral Nimitz Museum, Fredericksburg, Texas
- The Nimitz Freeway (Interstate 880) – from Oakland to San Jose, California, in the San Francisco Bay Area
- Nimitz Glacier in Antarctica for his service during Operation Highjump as the CNO
- Nimitz Boulevard – a major thoroughfare in the Point Loma Neighborhood of San Diego
- Fleet Admiral Chester W. Nimitz Gate – Main gate for Naval Base San Diego San Diego
- Nimitz BEQ at the Naval Nuclear Power Training Command in Goose Creek, South Carolina
- Camp Nimitz, a recruit camp constructed in 1955 at Naval Training Center San Diego
- Nimitz Highway – Hawaii Route 92 located in Honolulu, Hawaii near the Daniel K. Inouye International Airport
- The Nimitz Library, the main library at the US Naval Academy, Annapolis, Maryland
- Nimitz Drive, in the Admiral Heights neighborhood of Annapolis, Maryland
- Nimitz Lane, Willingboro, New Jersey
- Callaghan Hall (the Naval and Air Force ROTC building at UC Berkeley) containing the Nimitz Library (was gutted by arson in 1985)
- The town of Nimitz in Summers County, West Virginia
- The summit on Guam where Chester Nimitz relocated his Pacific Fleet headquarters, and where the current Commander US Naval Forces Marianas (ComNavMar) resides, is called Nimitz Hill
- Nimitz Park, a recreational area located at United States Fleet Activities Sasebo, Japan
- The Nimitz Trail in Tilden Park in Berkeley, California
- The Main Gate at Pearl Harbor is called Nimitz Gate
- Admiral Nimitz Circle – located in Fair Park, Dallas, Texas
- Chester Nimitz Oriental Garden Waltz performed by Austin Lounge Lizards
- Admiral Nimitz Fanfare composed by John Steven Lasher (2014)
- Admiral Nimitz March composed by John Steven Lasher (2014)
- The Nimitz Building, Raytheon Company site headquarters, Portsmouth, Rhode Island
- Nimitz Road in Diego Garcia, British Indian Ocean Territory, is named in his honor.
- Nimitz Place part of Havemeyer Park located in Old Greenwich, Connecticut, was named in his honor along with many other World War II military personnel.
- Nimitz Hall is the Officer Candidate School barracks of Naval Station Newport, Newport, Rhode Island. The barracks was dedicated 15 March 2013.
- Nimitz-McArthur Building, Headquarters US Pacific Command
- Nimitz Statue, designed by Armando Hinojosa of Laredo, is located at the entrance to SeaWorld in San Antonio, Texas.
- Nimitz Drive in Grants, New Mexico
- Fleet Admiral Chester W. Nimitz Statue, commissioned by the Naval Order of the United States, is situated near the bow of the USS Missouri memorial on Ford Island, facing the USS Arizona memorial. The statue was dedicated 2 September 2013.
- Nimitz Beach Park, Agat, Guam
- Nimitz Drive, Purdue University, West Lafayette, Indiana
- Nimitz Avenue, Mare Island, Vallejo California
- Chester W. Nimitz Street, Bakersfield, California
- Nimitz Road, Dover, Delaware
- Nimitz Street, College Station, Texas
- Nimitz Ave, State College, Pennsylvania

=== Schools ===
- Nimitz High School, (Harris County, Texas)
- Nimitz High School, Irving, Texas.
- Chester W. Nimitz Middle School, Odessa, Texas
- Chester W. Nimitz Middle School, Huntington Park, California
- Nimitz Middle School, San Antonio, Texas
- Chester Nimitz Middle School, Tulsa Oklahoma (Now Closed)
- Nimitz Elementary School, Sunnyvale, California
- Chester W. Nimitz Elementary School, Honolulu, Hawaii
- Nimitz Elementary School, Kerrville, Texas

=== Depictions in media ===
- in the 1965 war film In Harm's Way, actor Henry Fonda plays the character "CINCPAC II," who is most likely based on Nimitz.
- In the 1976 war film Midway, Nimitz is portrayed by actor Henry Fonda.
- In the 2019 war film Midway, Nimitz is portrayed by actor Woody Harrelson.
- In Sid Meier's Civilization VI, players can recruit Nimitz as a Great Admiral.

== See also ==
- Henry Arnold Karo—see hand-written inscription on photo given to Adm. Karo
- Admiral of the Navy

== Bibliography ==
- Borneman, Walter R. (2012). The Admirals: Nimitz, Halsey, Leahy and King – The Five-Star Admirals Who Won the War at Sea. New York: Little, Brown and Company. ISBN 978-0-316-09784-0.
- Johnston & Hedman (2022). A Good and Favorable Wind: The Unusual Story of a Submarine Under Sail and its Cautionary Lessons for the Modern Navy. Ann Arbor: Nimble Books LLC. ISBN 978-1-60888-200-7.
- Lilly, Michael A., Capt., USN (Ret), Nimitz at Ease, Stairway Press, 2019. ISBN 1949267261.
- "Some Thoughts to Live By", Chester W. Nimitz with Andrew Hamilton, ISBN 0-686-24072-3, reprinted from Boys' Life, 1966.
- Potter, E. B. Nimitz. Annapolis: Naval Institute Press, 1976. ISBN 978-0-87021-492-9.
- Potter, E. B., and Chester W. Nimitz. Sea Power. Englewood Cliffs, NJ: Prentice-Hall, 1960. ISBN 0-13-796870-1.
- Toll, Ian W. (2011). Pacific Crucible: War at Sea in the Pacific, 1941–1942. New York: W. W. Norton.
- ——— (2015). The Conquering Tide: War in the Pacific Islands, 1942–1944. New York: W. W. Norton.
- ——— (2020). Twilight of the Gods: War in the Western Pacific, 1944–1945. New York: W. W. Norton.

Military offices
Preceded by William S. Pye	Commander in Chief United States Pacific Fleet; 1941–1945	Succeeded by Raymond A. Spruance
Preceded by Ernest J. King	Chief of Naval Operations; 1945–1947	Succeeded by Louis E. Denfeld
Awards and achievements
Preceded by William Hood Simpson	Cover of Time magazine 26 February 1945	Succeeded by Ibn Saud of Saudi Arabia
