= Indian Mills =

Indian Mills may refer to:

- Indian Mills, New Jersey
- Indian Mills, West Virginia
