= Bargers Springs, West Virginia =

Unincorporated community in West Virginia, United States

- Unincorporated community
- Location within West Virginia Location within the United States
- Coordinates: 37°36′51″N 80°45′28″W
- Country: United States
- State: West Virginia
- County: Summers
- Elevation: 1,486 ft (453 m)
- Time zone: UTC-5 (Eastern (EST))
  - Summer (DST): UTC-4 (EDT)
- Area codes: 304 & 681
- GNIS feature ID: 1535214

Bargers Springs is an unincorporated community in Summers County, West Virginia, United States. It has also been called ″Greenbriar Springs″. Bargers Springs is located on the Greenbrier River, southeast of Hinton.

== History ==
Barger is the name of an early settler.
