= Barksdale, West Virginia =

Unincorporated community in West Virginia, United States

- Unincorporated community
- Location within West Virginia Location within the United States
- Coordinates: 37°42′27″N 80°53′11″W
- Country: United States
- State: West Virginia
- County: Summers
- Elevation: 1,401 ft (427 m)
- Time zone: UTC-5 (Eastern (EST))
  - Summer (DST): UTC-4 (EDT)
- Area codes: 304 & 681
- GNIS feature ID: 1549578

Barksdale is an unincorporated community in Summers County, West Virginia, United States. Barksdale is located on the New River and West Virginia Route 20, north of Hinton.
