= Mountview, West Virginia =

- Unincorporated community
- Location within West Virginia Location within the United States
- Coordinates: 37°38′31″N 81°03′55″W
- Country: United States
- State: West Virginia
- Counties: Raleigh and Summers
- Elevation: 2,979 ft (908 m)
- Time zone: UTC-5 (Eastern (EST))
  - Summer (DST): UTC-4 (EDT)
- Area codes: 304 & 681
- GNIS feature ID: 1555180

Mountview is an unincorporated community in Raleigh and Summers counties, West Virginia, United States. Mountview is west of Hinton and southeast of Beckley. County Routes 3/1, 3/12, and 19/22 are in Mountview. There are two ponds: one near Mt. View Road and another near Country Route 3/12. Spicelick Creek, Glade Creek, and Farley Creek run through the town. Features close to Mountview are Lake View Golf Course and the artificial Flat Top Lake.
