= Santafee, West Virginia =

- Unincorporated community
- Location within West Virginia Location within the United States
- Coordinates: 37°43′40″N 80°41′39″W
- Country: United States
- State: West Virginia
- County: Summers
- Elevation: 1,713 ft (522 m)
- Time zone: UTC-5 (Eastern (EST))
  - Summer (DST): UTC-4 (EDT)
- Area codes: 304 & 681
- GNIS feature ID: 1549536

Santafee is an unincorporated community in Summers County, West Virginia, United States. Santafee is 3 miles (4.8 km) west of Alderson.

The community's name most likely is derived from "Santa Fe".
