= Ralston Bowles =

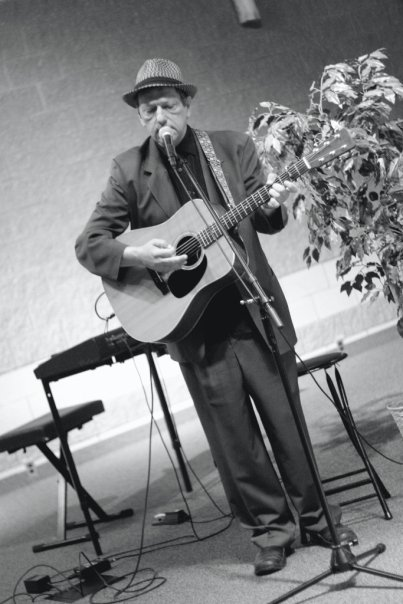
- Ralston playing his song "I, Love, You"
- Born: Ralston Bowles; 31 August 1952 (age 73); Gary, Indiana
- Occupations: Musician, singer-songwriter
- Spouse: Cindy Bowles (m. 1975)
- Children: Three
- Musical career
- Genres: Rock, folk rock, singer-songwriter
- Instruments: Vocals, guitar, mandolin, harmonica
- Years active: 1970–present
- Website: ralstonbowles.com

Ralston Bowles (born August 31, 1952) is an American poet, songwriter, producer, musician and singer from Grand Rapids, Michigan.

== Early life ==
Ralston Bowles was born on August 31, 1952, to parents, Buel Bowles of Green Sulphur Springs, West Virginia (1913–2002) and May Jean Morgan of Vincennes, Indiana (1919–1998).

== Career ==
Bowles' song "Fragile" has been recorded by Peter Mulvey, Rachael Davis and Caroline Aiken. His song "Grace" was based on a book by author Philip Yancey, What's So Amazing About Grace?. He wrote it after reading a pre-publication galley of the book. After the book was published, singer Bono of U2 wrote and released a similar song of the same title, based on the same book; the song appeared on their album All That You Can't Leave Behind.

Bowles has served the western Michigan music scene since 1970, helping the Grand Rapids music scene flourish while encouraging national artists to make Grand Rapids a tour stop on their schedules. He is the originator and host of the Frederik Meijer Gardens Tuesday Evening Music Club, and a supporter of numerous charities through benefit concerts. He has performed alongside many songwriters of note including Arlo Guthrie, the Hothouse Flowers, T-Bone Burnett, Shawn Colvin and the Del McCoury Band.

In 2004, Bowles released his debut album, Carwreck Conversations. It was produced by Marvin Etzioni (former member of Lone Justice and producer of Counting Crows, Toad the Wet Sprocket, Peter Case and Grey DeLisle), and engineered by David Vaught. The musicians include Sheldon Gomberg (bass) David Raven (drums), Brian Head (percussion), Danny McGough (keyboards), and Eric Heywood (pedal steel). It was recognized with three Jammie Awards: "album of the year", "best folk album" and "artist of the year."

2007 saw the re-release of Carwreck Conversations on Wildflower Records.

In 2008, Rally at the Texas Hotel was released on Wildflower Records in Europe and received accolades from Swedish and Dutch Americana Music Press. It was produced by Marvin Etzioni and features studio contributions by Gurf Morlix, Charlie Sexton, Jagoda, and Radoslav Lorković.

In 2010, Bowles completed recording a new album, produced by Phil Madeira.

== Discography ==
=== Solo albums ===
- Carwreck Conversations (2004)
- Carwreck Conversations - Wildflower Records release in Europe (2007)
- Rally at The Texas Hotel (2008)
- Little Miracles (2010)
- 12 Hours (2011)

=== Compilation albums ===
- Winter in West Michigan: A Benefit for Heartside Community (song: "Light a Candle") (2002)
- Standing Together: A Benefit for Public Schools ("Remember") (2003)
- Paste Magazine Music Sampler No. 9 ("Everybody but You") (2004)
- One on One (One Songwriter, One Instrument) ("Remember") (2004)
- Words ("Paper Moon") (2004)
- Grand Rapids Compilation ("Velvet Elvis") (2005)
- Standing Together 2: A Benefit for Public Schools ("Utah") (2009)
