= Buck, West Virginia =

Unincorporated community in West Virginia, United States

- Unincorporated community
- Location within West Virginia Location within the United States
- Coordinates: 37°36′06″N 80°49′26″W
- Country: United States
- State: West Virginia
- County: Summers
- Elevation: 1,644 ft (501 m)
- Time zone: UTC-5 (Eastern (EST))
  - Summer (DST): UTC-4 (EDT)
- Area codes: 304 & 681
- GNIS feature ID: 1549615

Buck is an unincorporated community in Summers County, West Virginia, United States, located southeast of Hinton.

The community most likely was named after the deer buck.
