= Elton, West Virginia =

Unincorporated community in West Virginia, United States

Elton
- Unincorporated community
- Location within the state of West Virginia Elton (the United States)
- Coordinates: 37°49′42″N 80°48′11″W
- Country: United States
- State: West Virginia
- County: Summers
- Time zone: UTC-5 (Eastern (EST))
  - Summer (DST): UTC-4 (EDT)

Elton (also Hutchinsons Mill) is an unincorporated community in Summers County, West Virginia, United States. It lies to the northeast of the city of Hinton, the county seat of Summers County. Its elevation is 1,749 feet (533 m). Elton had a post office, with the ZIP code of 25965, until it closed on July 11, 2009.

The name Elton most likely was derived from the name of a local family.
