= Marie, West Virginia =

- Unincorporated community
- Location within West Virginia
- Coordinates: 37°35′01″N 80°45′41″W
- Country: United States
- State: West Virginia
- County: Summers; Monroe
- Elevation: 2,064 ft (629 m)
- Time zone: UTC-5 (Eastern (EST))
  - Summer (DST): UTC-4 (EDT)
- Area codes: 304 & 681
- GNIS feature ID: 1542760

Marie is an unincorporated community in Summers County and Monroe County, West Virginia, United States, located southeast of Hinton.

The community was named after Gladys Marie Berger, a former resident.
