= Altair-class destroyer tender =

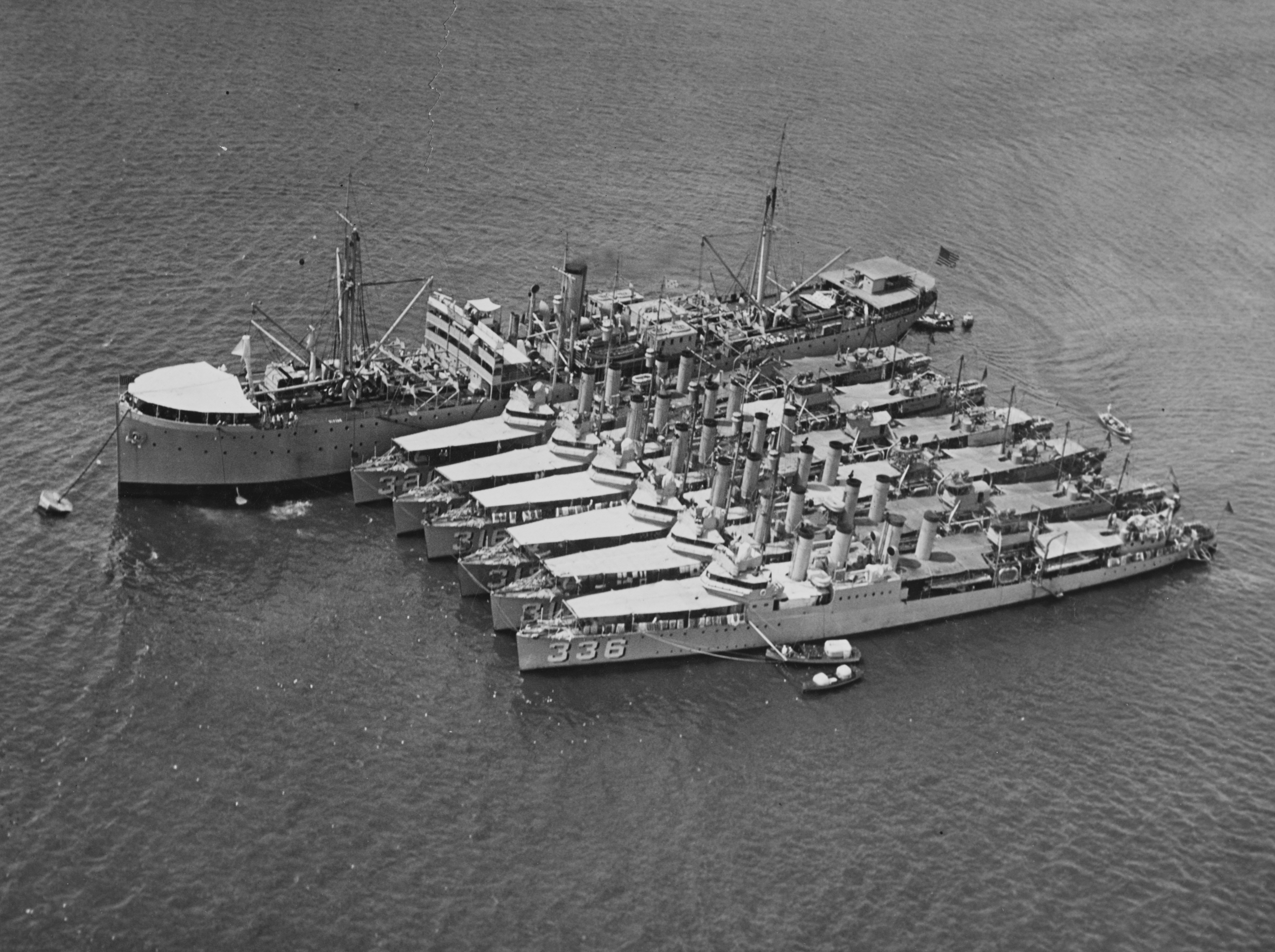
- USS Altair in Pearl Harbor with destroyers, 1925.

Class overview
- Name: Altair class destroyer tender
- Builders: Skinner & Eddy
- Operators: United States Navy
- Preceded by: USS Bridgeport (AD-10)
- Succeeded by: Dixie-class destroyer tender
- Completed: 3
- Retired: 3

General characteristics
- Type: Destroyer tender
- Displacement: 6,250 long tons (6,350 t)
- Length: 423 ft 9 in (129.16 m)
- Beam: 54 ft 0 in (16.46 m)
- Draft: 21 ft 3 in (6.48 m)
- Propulsion: 2,500 horsepower (1,900 kW) 1-shaft geared turbine
- Speed: 10.5 knots (12.1 mph; 19.4 km/h)
- Complement: 590
- Armament: 1 × 5"/38 caliber gun; 4 × 3"/50 caliber guns; 6 × Bofors 40 mm guns

The Altair class destroyer tender was a class of three United States Navy destroyer tenders. These ships were built in Skinner & Eddy's Seattle shipyard as commercial cargo ships during World War I, and acquired by the Navy when the shipyard closed in 1921. All three served through World War II, and were decommissioned and scrapped shortly after the war.

== Altair ==
SS Edisto was launched 10 May 1919, and commissioned as USS Altair (AD-11) on 6 December 1921. She was converted to a destroyer tender at the Brooklyn Navy Yard, and equipped with machine tools and shop equipment salvaged from dismantled war plants in the demobilization after World War I. She became the tender for destroyer squadron 12 in San Diego on 17 December 1922. San Diego remained her home port until the Battle Fleet moved to Pearl Harbor in 1940. She arrived in Bermuda on 11 November 1941 to support Neutrality Patrol destroyers, and was subsequently stationed in Trinidad and Guantánamo Bay through World War II. She was scrapped in 1947.

== Denebola ==
SS Edgewood was launched 12 April 1919, and commissioned as USS Denebola (AD-12) on 28 November 1921. She was converted to a destroyer tender at the Philadelphia Naval Shipyard, and equipped with machine tools and shop equipment salvaged from dismantled war plants in the demobilization after World War I. After serving briefly in the Mediterranean, she was decommissioned at Norfolk Naval Shipyard from 1924 to 1940, and never received the 5-inch gun carried by her sisters. She was recommissioned to prepare destroyers for transfer to the Royal Navy in Halifax Harbour for the Destroyers for Bases Agreement. She was then stationed in Casco Bay tending Mid-Ocean Escort Force destroyers until sent to the Mediterranean in July 1944 to tend destroyers at Cagliari for Operation Dragoon. She was scrapped in 1950.

== Rigel ==
SS Edgecombe was launched 23 November 1918, and commissioned as USS Rigel (AD-13) on 24 February 1922. She was converted to a destroyer tender equipped with machine tools and shop equipment salvaged from dismantled war plants in the demobilization after World War I. She was stationed at San Diego until reclassified as repair ship (AR-11) in April 1941, and only received four Bofors guns while her sisters carried six as destroyer tenders. She was lightly damaged in the attack on Pearl Harbor, and remained at Pearl Harbor until April 1942. She was stationed in Auckland until November, Espiritu Santo until January 1943, and Efate through April 1943. She was then stationed in New Guinea providing repair services to the VII Amphibious Force from 7 June 1943 to 10 January 1945; and spent the remainder of 1945 in the Philippines. She was scrapped in 1950.

== Sources ==
- Silverstone, Paul H. (1968). U.S. Warships of World War II. Garden City, New York: Doubleday & Company.
