= Brooks, West Virginia =

Unincorporated community in West Virginia, United States

Brooks
- Unincorporated community
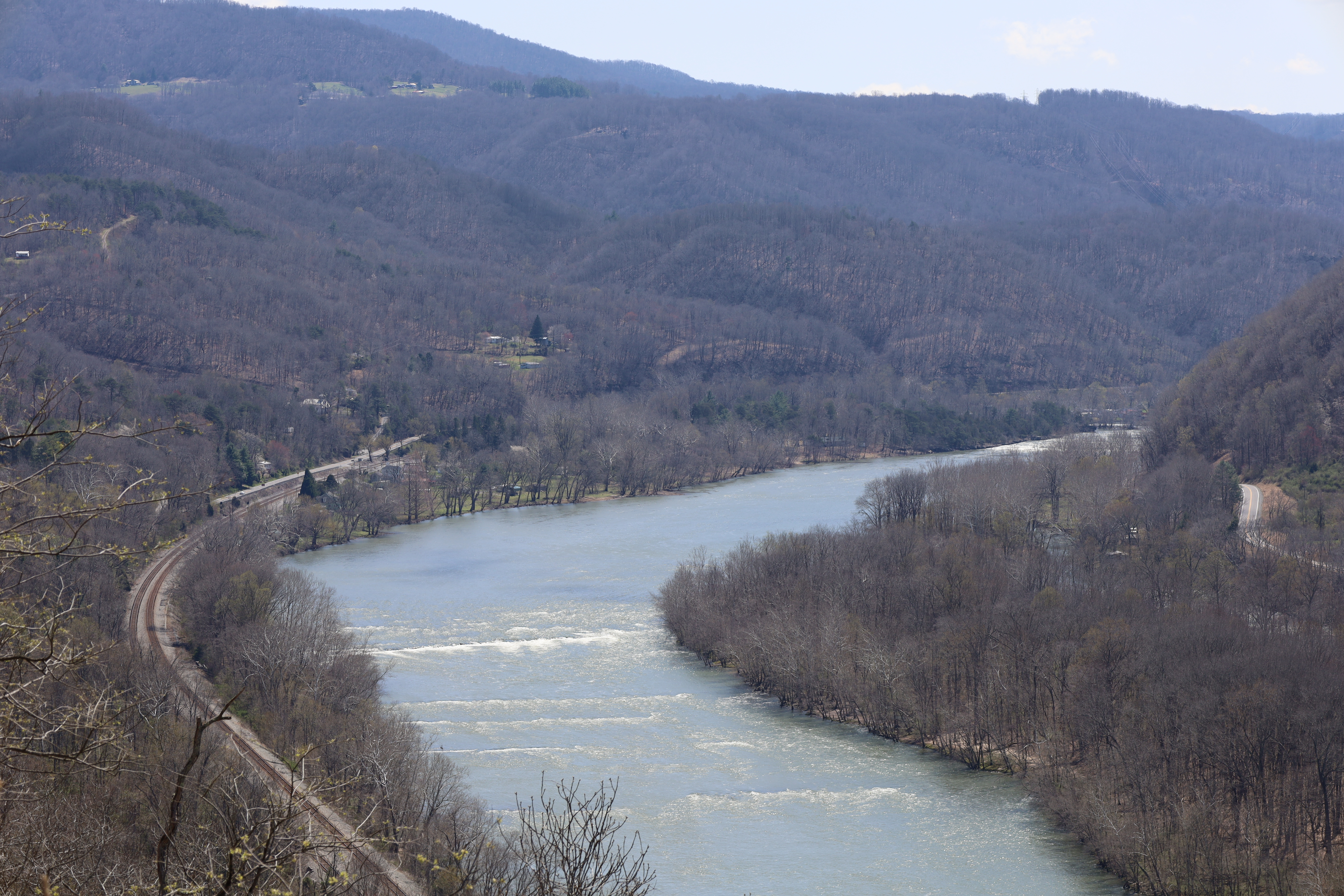
- Brooks viewed from the Brooks Falls Overlook in 2022

- Location within the state of West Virginia Brooks (the United States)
- Coordinates: 37°43′27″N 80°53′11″W
- Country: United States
- State: West Virginia
- County: Summers
- Time zone: UTC-5 (Eastern (EST))
  - Summer (DST): UTC-4 (EDT)

Brooks is an unincorporated community in Summers County, West Virginia, United States. It lies along the New River to the north of the city of Hinton, the county seat of Summers County. Its elevation is 1,657 feet (505 m).

== History ==
Brooks is named for an early settler.
