= USS Denebola (AD-12) =

Altair-class destroyer tender

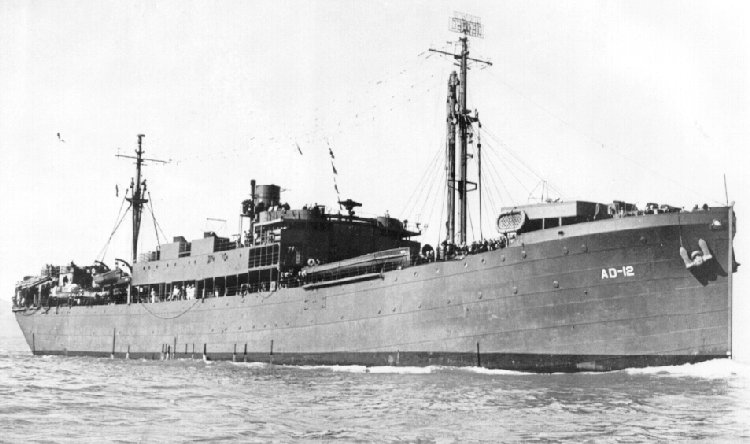
- USS Denebola (AD-12) underway.

History

United States
- Name: USS Denebola
- Builder: Skinner and Eddy Corporation, Seattle
- Launched: 19 April 1919 as SS Edgewood
- Completed: May 1919
- Commissioned: 28 November 1921
- Decommissioned: 9 August 1924
- Recommissioned: 18 January 1940
- Decommissioned: 10 April 1946
- Honours and awards: 1 battle star (WWII)
- Fate: Transferred to the Maritime Commission for disposal, 1 July 1946

General characteristics
- Class & type: Altair-class destroyer tender
- Displacement: 6,250 long tons (6,350 t) light; 10,000 long tons (10,160 t) full
- Length: 423 ft 9 in (129.16 m)
- Beam: 54 ft 3 in (16.54 m)
- Draft: 20 ft 7 in (6.27 m)
- Propulsion: Geared turbine, single propeller
- Speed: 10.5 knots (19.4 km/h; 12.1 mph)
- Complement: 481 officers and enlisted
- Armament: 4 × 3"/50 caliber guns; 4 × twin 40 mm guns; 6 × twin 20 mm guns

USS Denebola (AD-12) was an Altair-class destroyer tender named for Denebola, the third-brightest star in the constellation Leo.

Originally built in 1919 as SS Edgewood by Skinner and Eddy of Seattle, Washington, then transferred from the Shipping Board on 4 November 1921 and converted for naval use at Philadelphia Navy Yard. She was commissioned as USS Denebola (AD-12) on 28 November 1921.

== Service history ==
=== Destroyer tender, 1922–1924 ===
Denebola served on the Atlantic Coast until 21 November 1922 when she cleared Philadelphia for the Mediterranean and duty as tender and repair ship to the U.S. Naval Detachment in Turkish waters. She got underway from Constantinople 18 November 1923 and called at Bizerte and Tunis, Tunisia; Gibraltar; and the Azores on her way to New York, where she arrived 23 December. Denebola joined in winter maneuvers in the Caribbean in 1924. She was placed out of commission in reserve at Philadelphia on 9 August.

=== In reserve, 1924–1940 ===
Except for the period 1931 to 1934 when she served as barracks ship at Norfolk for the crews of battleships undergoing modernization, Denebola remained out of commission, at Philadelphia until she was towed to Baltimore, Maryland in 1940. She was commissioned in ordinary there 18 January 1940 for overhaul and refit.

=== Reactivated, 1940 ===
Again in full commission, on 6 April 1940 Denebola sailed to Norfolk for shakedown exercises in Chesapeake Bay, then returned to Baltimore to have flag quarters installed. On 14 August she arrived at Norfolk Navy Yard and reported to Commander, Destroyers, Atlantic Squadron, U.S. Fleet, to overhaul destroyers and serve as flagship. On 1 September she sailed for Halifax, Nova Scotia, arriving five days later, to prepare and transfer to the British government destroyers involved in the land bases-destroyers exchange. She was visited by the Earl of Athlone, Governor General of Canada, on 8 September. Returning to Norfolk 3 November, she made two similar trips to Halifax in the next month and a half.

=== World War II ===
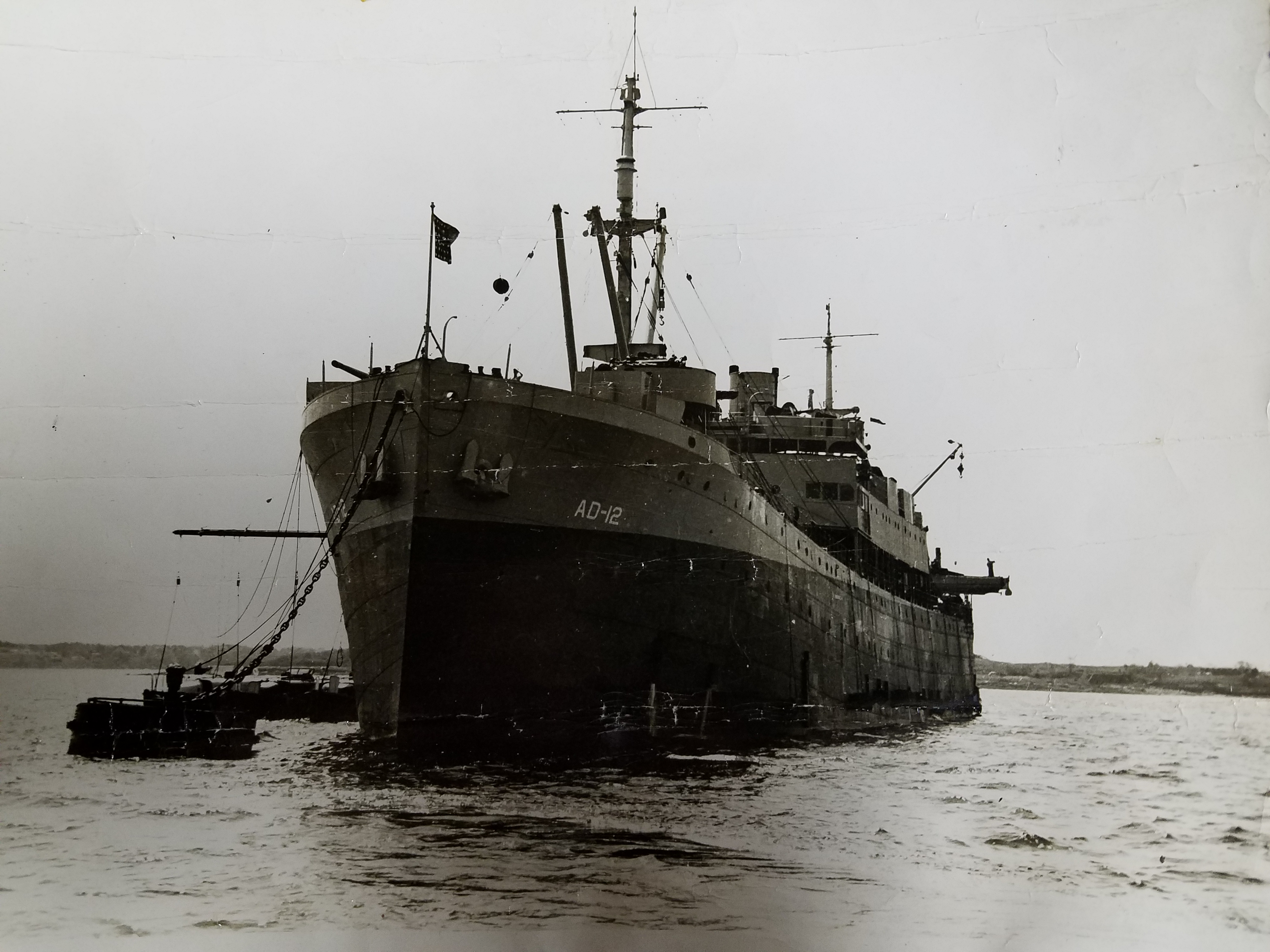

During early 1941 Denebola served at Norfolk, tending destroyers and conducting schools in repair work, cruising to Guantanamo Bay, Cuba, once and to Bermuda twice. She arrived in Casco Bay, Maine on 12 September to serve as tender to destroyers and other ships there until 5 July 1944.

Denebola sailed from Norfolk on 24 July 1944 for duty in the Mediterranean, furnishing tender services at Cagliari, Sardinia, during the invasion of southern France. She continued this duty at Ajaccio, Corsica, and St. Tropez, France, until 23 September when she put into Naples for tender duty until 27 October. She returned to Casco Bay, Maine 1 December. Arriving at Boston 30 April 1945 for repairs, Denebola got underway 13 May for the Pacific, arriving at Eniwetok 30 June. She provided upkeep and repair services to destroyers and other ships until 6 November when she sailed for San Diego, arriving 26 November. She aided in preparing ships for decommissioning until 14 February 1946 when she got underway for San Francisco. Denebola was decommissioned there 10 April 1946 and transferred to the Maritime Commission for disposal 1 July 1946.

Denebola received one battle star for World War II service.
