= Indian Mills, West Virginia =

Indian Mills
- Unincorporated community
- Location within the state of West Virginia Indian Mills (the United States)
- Coordinates: 37°31′42″N 80°49′1″W
- Country: United States
- State: West Virginia
- County: Summers
- Time zone: UTC-5 (Eastern (EST))
  - Summer (DST): UTC-4 (EDT)

Indian Mills is an unincorporated community in Summers County, West Virginia, United States. It lies to the southeast of the city of Hinton, the county seat of Summers County. Its elevation is 1,545 feet (471 m).
