= USS Rigel (AD-13) =

Altair-class destroyer tender

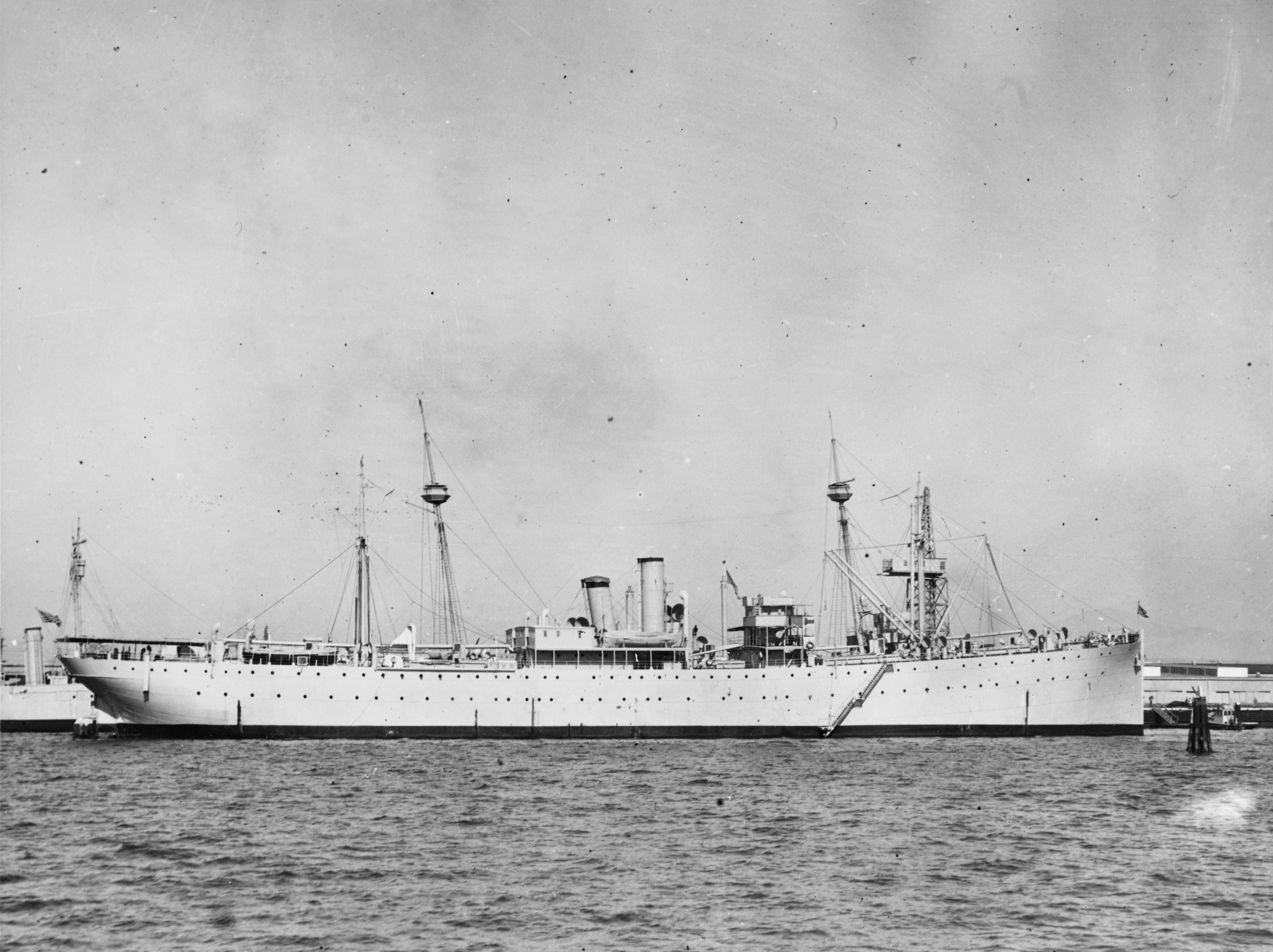
- Rigel before World War II

History

United States
- Name: USS Rigel
- Builder: Skinner and Eddy Corporation, Seattle
- Laid down: 1918
- Launched: 23 November 1918 as SS Edgecombe
- Completed: December 1918
- Acquired: 29 October 1921
- Commissioned: 24 February 1922
- Decommissioned: 11 July 1946
- Reclassified: AR-11, 10 April 1941
- Honours and awards: 4 battle stars (WWII)
- Fate: Transferred to the Maritime Commission for disposal, 12 July 1946. She was sold for scrap on February 6, 1948.

General characteristics
- Class & type: Altair-class destroyer tender
- Displacement: 6,250 long tons (6,350 t) light; 10,000 long tons (10,160 t) full
- Length: 423 ft 9 in (129.16 m)
- Beam: 54 ft 3 in (16.54 m)
- Draft: 20 ft 7 in (6.27 m)
- Propulsion: Geared turbine, single propeller
- Speed: 10.5 knots (19.4 km/h; 12.1 mph)
- Complement: 481 officers and enlisted
- Armament: 4 × 3"/50 caliber guns; 4 × twin 40 mm guns; 6 × twin 20 mm guns

USS Rigel (AD-13/ARb-1/AR-11) was an Altair class destroyer tender named for Rigel, the brightest star in the constellation Orion.

Originally built in 1918 as SS Edgecombe by the Skinner and Eddy Corporation of Seattle, Washington for the United States Shipping Board, she was transferred to the United States Navy by Executive Order on 29 October 1921, delivered 16 November 1921, converted to a destroyer tender, and commissioned as USS Rigel on 24 February 1922.

== Service history ==
=== 1922–1941 ===
Following an extensive fitting out period and shakedown, Rigel was homeported at San Diego. During the interwar period she remained in southern California, usually serving as a stationary receiving and headquarters ship for Destroyer Base San Diego. During 1941, she was briefly redesignated as ARb-1, (a base repair ship).

=== 1941–1942 ===
Redesignated a repair ship, AR-11, on 10 April 1941, she underwent overhaul at Bremerton, Washington then sailed to Hawaii for more extensive repairs and alterations. By mid-July, she was at Pearl Harbor and was still in the yard on 7 December 1941. She was without her authorized armament and superstructure and was slightly damaged during the Japanese attack. Her crew, unable to fire, immediately turned their skills to rescue and salvage operations. Conversion work on Rigel was completed on 7 April 1942.

On 20 April, with four 3-inch guns mounted, she got underway for the South Pacific. Steaming first to Fanning Island, she disembarked U.S. Army units and material and embarked personnel of New Zealand's Pacific Island Force and civilian evacuees. On the 28th, she continued westward and on 16 May arrived at Auckland to add her equipment and personnel to the repair and construction facilities offered by that port. Between then and November she converted merchant ships and tugboats to Navy use, repaired other merchantmen, installed and repaired guns on merchant ships; trained armed guard crews, served as flagship for Vice Admiral Robert L. Ghormley, and as store ship and receiving ship; provided printing facilities; assisted in the construction of shore facilities; and added ten 20 mm guns to her own armament, in addition to her assigned duties of repairing Allied warships and auxiliaries.

In November, she was again called on to substitute as a transport. On the 8th, she embarked Army units and on the 9th, she sailed for New Caledonia. Arriving at Nouméa on 14 November, she shifted to Espiritu Santo two days later and contributed her skills to the Guadalcanal campaign.

=== 1943–1944 ===
In mid-January 1943, she shifted to Efate, and, on 24 April, got underway to return to the South Pacific where the 7th Amphibious Force was being formed. Rigel arrived at Sydney on 1 May, moved on to Brisbane on the 15th and until 14 June helped take the pressure off repair facilities there. But the 7th Amphibious Force's first assault landing was imminent and Rigel's assistance was needed in the forward area. On 21 June the repair ship arrived in Milne Bay, New Guinea, and on the 22nd Rear Admiral Daniel E. Barbey, Commander, 7th Amphibious Force, raised his flag. On the 30th, the force landed troops on Woodlark and Kiriwina and the encirclement of Rabaul from the south was initiated.

For the next 6 1/2 months Rigel remained at Milne Bay, repairing ships from LSTs, LCIs, and MTBs to tankers, cruisers, and battleships. By December, Allied forces had moved up the coast to dispute control of Vitiaz and Dampier Straits. In December, landings were made on New Britain at Arawe and Cape Gloucester, and in January 1944, at Finschhafen and Saidor in New Guinea. Rigel, no longer Admiral Barbey's flagship, soon followed.

Again bringing her vital equipment and trained men closer to the front, she moved to Cape Sudest, thence proceeded to Buna where her crew continued their round-the-clock schedule from 13 January until 9 June. From Buna she moved up the coast to Alexishafen, whence, in late August, she returned to Australia for a much needed overhaul. She was at Sydney during the initial thrust into the Philippines, but in November returned to New Guinea and continued her work at Hollandia, 22 November to 10 January 1945. On the latter date she got underway for the Philippines.

=== 1945–1946 ===
Rigel arrived in Leyte Gulf on 15 January. On the 16th she anchored in San Pedro Bay, where she remained through the end of the War. After brief postwar service, Rigel returned to the United States for inactivation. She was decommissioned on 11 July 1946 and was transferred to the Maritime Commission for disposal 12 July 1946. She was sold for scrap on February 6, 1948, and was scrapped by Dulien Steel Products Inc.

Rigel earned four battle stars during World War II.
