= Nimitz, West Virginia =

Nimitz
- Unincorporated community
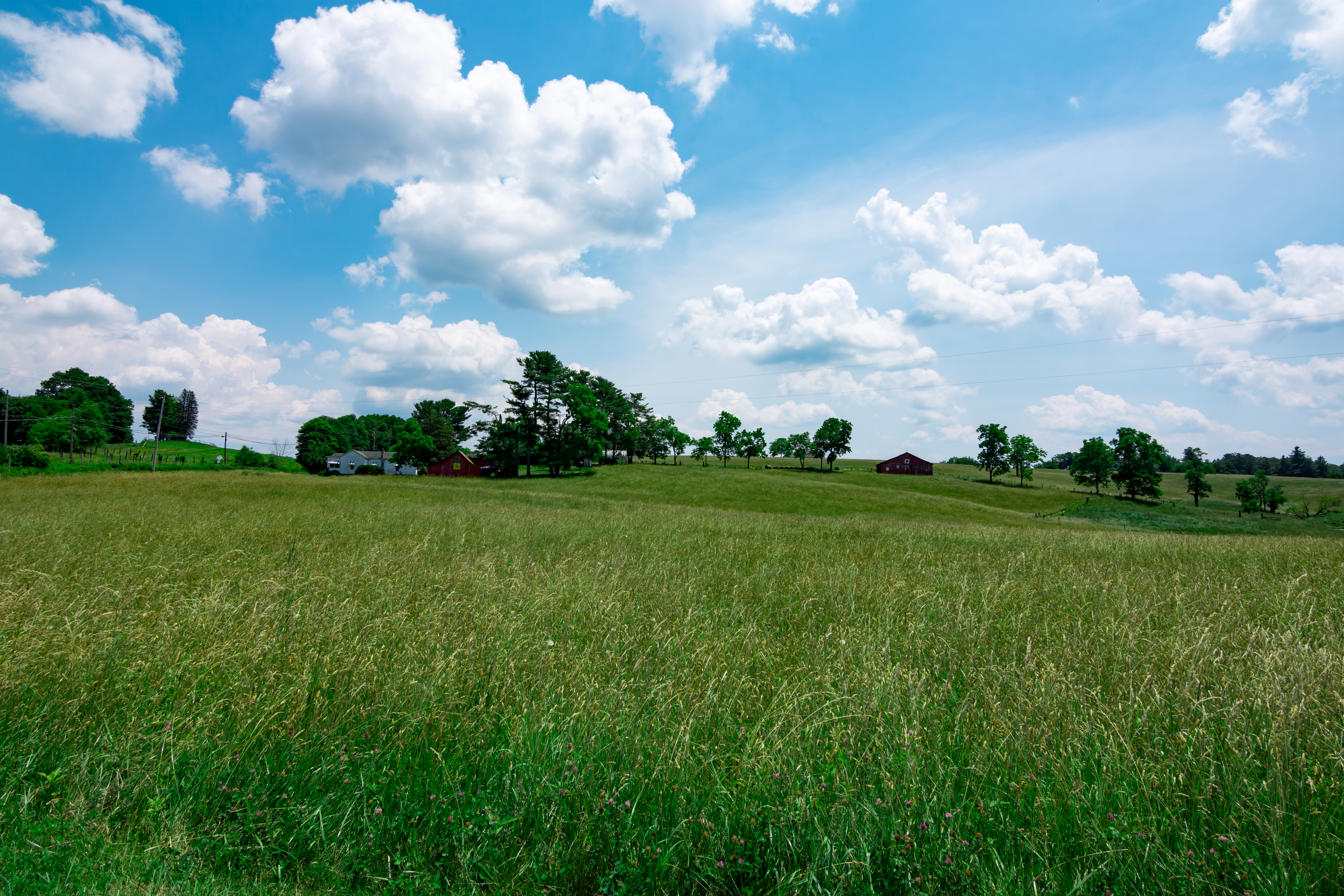

- Location within the state of West Virginia Nimitz (the United States)
- Coordinates: 37°38′46″N 80°57′36″W
- Country: United States
- State: West Virginia
- County: Summers
- Time zone: UTC-5 (Eastern (EST))
  - Summer (DST): UTC-4 (EDT)
- ZIP codes: 25978

Nimitz is an unincorporated community in Summers County, West Virginia, United States. It lies along West Virginia Route 3 to the west of the city of Hinton, the county seat of Summers County. Its elevation is 2,523 feet (769 m). It has a post office with the ZIP code 25978.
