= Green Sulphur Springs, West Virginia =

Green Sulphur Springs
- Unincorporated community
- Location within the state of West Virginia Green Sulphur Springs (the United States)
- Coordinates: 37°34′12″N 80°47′22″W
- Country: United States
- State: West Virginia
- County: Summers
- Time zone: UTC-5 (Eastern (EST))
  - Summer (DST): UTC-4 (EDT)
- ZIP codes: 25966

Green Sulphur Springs (also Green Sulphur) is an unincorporated community in Summers County, West Virginia, United States. It lies near Interstate 64 to the northeast of the city of Hinton, the county seat of Summers County. Its elevation is 1,552 feet (473 m). Green Sulphur Springs had a post office, with the ZIP code 25966, until it closed on February 29, 1992.

== History ==
Green Sulphur Springs takes its name from an underground spring containing sulfur. It was discovered in the 19th century by accident when prospectors were drilling for salt water.
