= Summers County, West Virginia =

County in West Virginia, United States

- County
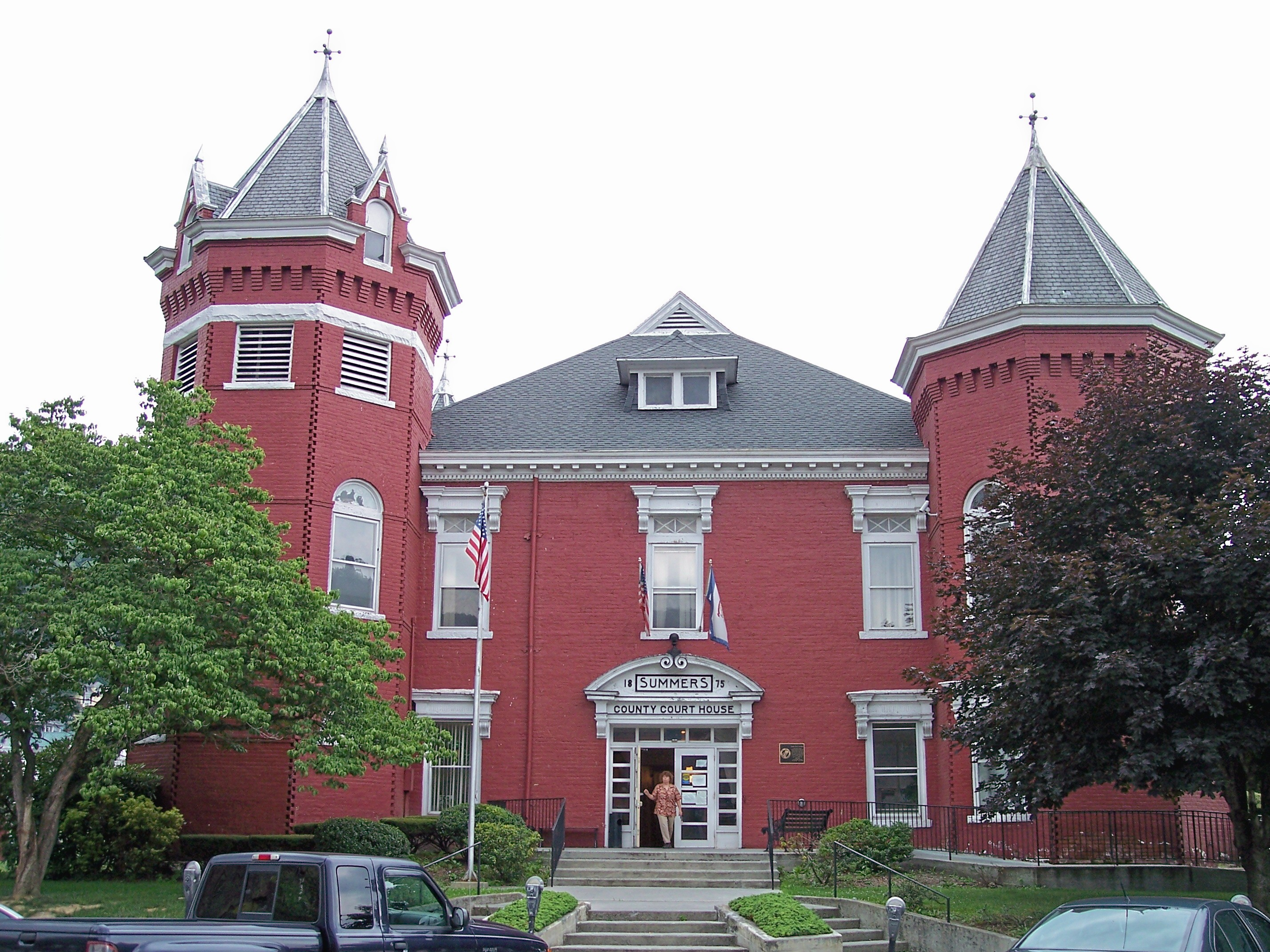
- The Summers County Courthouse in Hinton

- Seal

- Location within the U.S. state of West Virginia
- Coordinates: 37°40′N 80°52′W
- Country: United States
- State: West Virginia
- Founded: February 27, 1871
- Named for: George W. Summers
- Seat: Hinton
- Largest city: Hinton

Area
  - Total: 368 sq mi (950 km^{2})
  - Land: 360 sq mi (930 km^{2})
  - Water: 7.3 sq mi (19 km^{2}) 2.0%

Population (2020)
  - Total: 11,959
  - Estimate (2025): 11,532 ▼
  - Density: 33/sq mi (13/km^{2})
- Time zone: UTC−5 (Eastern)
  - Summer (DST): UTC−4 (EDT)
- Congressional district: 1st
- Website: summerscountywv.gov

Summers County is a county located in the U.S. state of West Virginia. As of the 2020 census, the population was 11,959. Its county seat is Hinton. The county was created by an act of the West Virginia Legislature on February 27, 1871, from parts of Fayette, Greenbrier, Mercer and Monroe counties and named in honor of George W. Summers (1804–1868).

== Geography ==
According to the United States Census Bureau, the county has a total area of 368 square miles (950 km^{2}), of which 360 square miles (930 km^{2}) is land and 7.3 square miles (19 km^{2}) (2.0%) is water.

After gaining independence from Virginia in 1863, West Virginia's counties were divided into civil townships, with the intention of encouraging local government. This proved impractical in the heavily rural state, and in 1872 the townships were converted into magisterial districts. Summers County was initially divided into five townships: Forest Hill, Greenbrier, Green Sulphur, Jumping Branch, and Pipestem. Forest Hill consisted of territory received from Monroe County, where it had been part of a township of the same name. Greenbrier was also formed from territory that had been part of Monroe County. Green Sulphur was formed from territory received from Fayette and Greenbrier Counties, while Jumping Branch and Pipestem consisted of land received from Mercer County.

As the second-last of West Virginia's counties to be created, Summers County had townships for only a year before they were converted into magisterial districts. In 1879, Talcott District was organized from part of Greenbrier. The six historical districts remained largely unchanged for the next century, until in the 1970s they were consolidated into three new magisterial districts: Bluestone River, Greenbrier River, and New River.

=== Major highways ===
- Interstate 64
- West Virginia Route 3
- West Virginia Route 12
- West Virginia Route 20
- West Virginia Route 107

=== Adjacent counties ===
- Greenbrier County (northeast)
- Monroe County (east)
- Mercer County (southwest)
- Raleigh County (west)
- Fayette County (northwest)
- Giles County, Virginia (south)

=== National protected areas ===
- Bluestone National Scenic River (part)
- New River Gorge National Park and Preserve (part)

== Attractions and Tourism ==
Summers County has many historical and natural attractions within its boundaries, including the Col. James Graham House, in Lowell; the Big Bend Tunnel in Talcott, WV, home to the John Henry (folklore) legend; Historic downtown Hinton, WV, which is the county seat. The Greenbrier river also flows through the county from Pence Springs to Hinton, and is known for many water-based recreational activities.

== Demographics ==
Historical population
Census	Pop.	Note	%±
1880	9,033		—
1890	13,117		45.2%
1900	16,265		24.0%
1910	18,429		13.3%
1920	19,092		3.6%
1930	20,469		7.2%
1940	20,409		−0.3%
1950	19,183		−6.0%
1960	15,640		−18.5%
1970	13,213		−15.5%
1980	15,875		20.1%
1990	14,204		−10.5%
2000	12,999		−8.5%
2010	13,927		7.1%
2020	11,959		−14.1%
2025 (est.)	11,532	▼	−3.6%
U.S. Decennial Census; 1790–1960 1900–1990; 1990–2000 2010–2020

=== 2020 census ===
As of the 2020 census, the county had a population of 11,959. Of the residents, 17.4% were under the age of 18 and 25.5% were 65 years of age or older; the median age was 48.6 years. For every 100 females there were 83.4 males, and for every 100 females age 18 and over there were 80.1 males.

The racial makeup of the county was 91.4% White, 3.4% Black or African American, 0.3% American Indian and Alaska Native, 0.3% Asian, 0.3% from some other race, and 4.4% from two or more races. Hispanic or Latino residents of any race comprised 1.5% of the population.

There were 4,921 households in the county, of which 23.1% had children under the age of 18 living with them and 28.1% had a female householder with no spouse or partner present. About 32.4% of all households were made up of individuals and 17.2% had someone living alone who was 65 years of age or older.

There were 6,529 housing units, of which 24.6% were vacant. Among occupied housing units, 75.5% were owner-occupied and 24.5% were renter-occupied. The homeowner vacancy rate was 2.3% and the rental vacancy rate was 5.9%.

Summers County, West Virginia – Racial and ethnic composition Note: the US Census treats Hispanic/Latino as an ethnic category. This table excludes Latinos from the racial categories and assigns them to a separate category. Hispanics/Latinos may be of any race.
Race / Ethnicity (NH = Non-Hispanic)	Pop 2000	Pop 2010	Pop 2020	% 2000	% 2010	% 2020
White alone (NH)	12,494	12,837	10,823	96.11%	92.17%	90.50%
Black or African American alone (NH)	280	645	400	2.15%	4.63%	3.35%
Native American or Alaska Native alone (NH)	32	38	33	0.25%	0.27%	0.28%
Asian alone (NH)	12	28	33	0.09%	0.20%	0.28%
Pacific Islander alone (NH)	5	0	0	0.04%	0.00%	0.00%
Other race alone (NH)	9	12	21	0.07%	0.09%	0.18%
Mixed race or Multiracial (NH)	96	178	464	0.74%	1.28%	3.88%
Hispanic or Latino (any race)	71	189	185	0.55%	1.36%	1.55%
Total	12,999	13,927	11,959	100.00%	100.00%	100.00%

=== 2010 census ===
As of the 2010 United States census, there were 13,927 people, 5,572 households, and 3,632 families living in the county. The population density was 38.6 inhabitants per square mile (14.9/km^{2}). There were 7,680 housing units at an average density of 21.3 units per square mile (8.2 units/km^{2}). The racial makeup of the county was 93.0% white, 4.8% black or African American, 0.3% American Indian, 0.2% Asian, 0.4% from other races, and 1.3% from two or more races. Those of Hispanic or Latino origin made up 1.4% of the population. In terms of ancestry, 20.2% were Irish, 18.2% were German, 17.1% were English, and 10.2% were American.

Of the 5,572 households, 24.5% had children under the age of 18 living with them, 48.8% were married couples living together, 10.9% had a female householder with no husband present, 34.8% were non-families, and 30.8% of all households were made up of individuals. The average household size was 2.26 and the average family size was 2.79. The median age was 45.7 years.

The median income for a household in the county was $27,720 and the median income for a family was $39,235. Males had a median income of $27,382 versus $25,011 for females. The per capita income for the county was $15,190. About 15.6% of families and 21.6% of the population were below the poverty line, including 23.4% of those under age 18 and 18.8% of those age 65 or over.

=== 2000 census ===
As of the census of 2000, there were 12,999 people, 5,530 households, and 3,754 families residing in the county. The population density was 36 people per square mile (14 people/km^{2}). There were 7,331 housing units at an average density of 20 units per square mile (7.7 units/km^{2}). The racial makeup of the county was 96.57% White, 2.15% Black or African American, 0.25% Native American, 0.09% Asian, 0.04% Pacific Islander, 0.10% from other races, and 0.79% from two or more races. 0.55% of the population were Hispanic or Latino of any race.

There were 5,530 households, out of which 25.70% had children under the age of 18 living with them, 53.80% were married couples living together, 10.00% had a female householder with no husband present, and 32.10% were non-families. 29.10% of all households were made up of individuals, and 14.40% had someone living alone who was 65 years of age or older. The average household size was 2.32 and the average family size was 2.84.

In the county, the population was spread out, with 20.50% under the age of 18, 7.50% from 18 to 24, 24.70% from 25 to 44, 27.30% from 45 to 64, and 19.90% who were 65 years of age or older. The median age was 43 years. For every 100 females there were 95.60 males. For every 100 females age 18 and over, there were 93.00 males.

The median income for a household in the county was $21,147, and the median income for a family was $27,251. Males had a median income of $27,485 versus $18,491 for females. The per capita income for the county was $12,419. 24.40% of the population and 20.30% of families were below the poverty line. Out of the total population, 34.30% of those under the age of 18 and 14.50% of those 65 and older were living below the poverty line.

== Politics ==
Like most of heavily secessionist Southern West Virginia, Summers County was powerfully Democratic for the century-and-a-third following West Virginia statehood. It voted Republican only in the landslide wins of 1920, 1928 (aided by powerful anti-Catholic sentiment against Al Smith), 1972 and 1984. Like all of West Virginia, Summers County has experienced a dramatic swing since 2000 towards the Republican Party due to declining unionization and differences with the Democratic Party's liberal views on social issues.

United States presidential election results for Summers County, West Virginia
Year	Republican		Democratic		Third party(ies)	
Year	No.	%	No.	%	No.	%
1912	791	18.66%	2,111	49.79%	1,338	31.56%
1916	1,781	42.47%	2,389	56.96%	24	0.57%
1920	3,611	50.24%	3,552	49.42%	24	0.33%
1924	3,124	41.52%	3,998	53.14%	402	5.34%
1928	4,063	51.88%	3,752	47.91%	17	0.22%
1932	3,220	35.74%	5,724	63.53%	66	0.73%
1936	3,521	37.82%	5,779	62.07%	11	0.12%
1940	3,644	40.11%	5,441	59.89%	0	0.00%
1944	2,967	40.28%	4,399	59.72%	0	0.00%
1948	2,782	37.53%	4,630	62.47%	0	0.00%
1952	3,496	43.93%	4,463	56.07%	0	0.00%
1956	3,712	48.99%	3,865	51.01%	0	0.00%
1960	3,137	40.43%	4,622	59.57%	0	0.00%
1964	1,962	28.03%	5,037	71.97%	0	0.00%
1968	2,305	34.53%	3,521	52.75%	849	12.72%
1972	3,895	60.74%	2,518	39.26%	0	0.00%
1976	2,254	36.37%	3,943	63.63%	0	0.00%
1980	2,456	42.37%	3,114	53.72%	227	3.92%
1984	2,975	52.57%	2,670	47.18%	14	0.25%
1988	2,231	41.98%	3,072	57.81%	11	0.21%
1992	1,652	33.84%	2,650	54.28%	580	11.88%
1996	1,505	34.49%	2,397	54.94%	461	10.57%
2000	2,304	48.89%	2,299	48.78%	110	2.33%
2004	2,978	53.91%	2,504	45.33%	42	0.76%
2008	2,891	54.38%	2,290	43.08%	135	2.54%
2012	2,981	62.84%	1,621	34.17%	142	2.99%
2016	3,455	70.61%	1,190	24.32%	248	5.07%
2020	4,074	72.95%	1,448	25.93%	63	1.13%
2024	3,931	74.68%	1,226	23.29%	107	2.03%

== Government and infrastructure ==
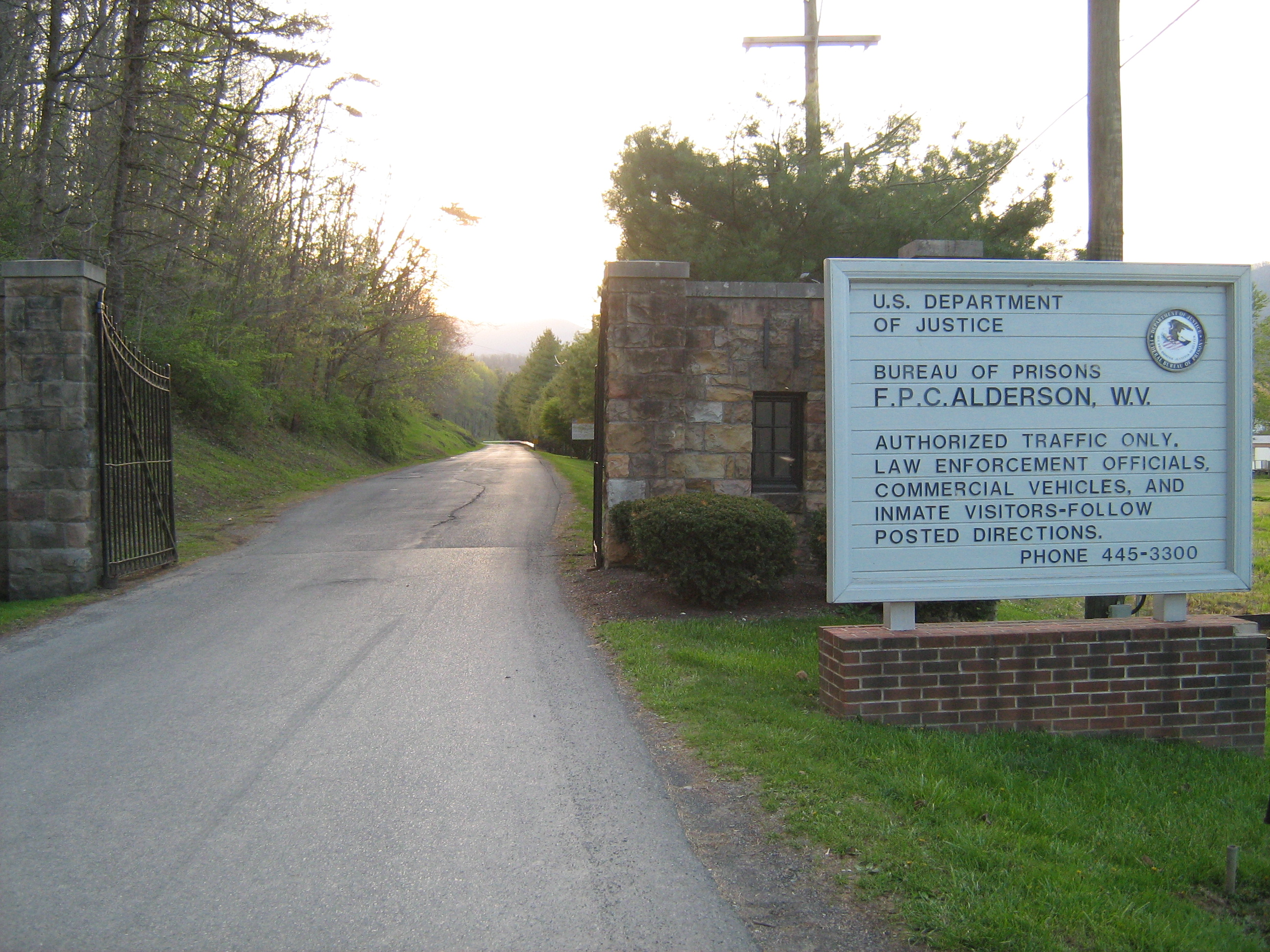
Federal Prison Camp, Alderson

The Federal Bureau of Prisons Federal Prison Camp, Alderson is partly in unincorporated Monroe County and partly in unincorporated Summers County.

== Education ==
Public schools in Summers County are governed by the Summers County Schools school district; per West Virginia state law, all school districts in West Virginia follow county boundaries. 1,548 students are enrolled in the five public schools in Summers County. Summers County has one public high school, Summers County High School, which serves students in grades 9–12; one middle school, Summers Middle School, which serves students in grades 5–8; and three elementary schools, Hinton Area Elementary School, serving Pre-K through 4th grades, and Jumping Branch Elementary School and Talcott Elementary School which serve students in grades Pre-K through 5. Summers County High School has a total enrollment of 458 students and a graduation rate of 78.45%. Summers Middle School has an enrollment of 334 students, and Hinton Area Elementary School, Jumping Branch Elementary School, and Talcott Elementary School have enrollments of 469, 132, and 155 students respectively.

Summers County is also home to one private school, Pipestem Christian Academy. Pipestem Christian Academy is part of the West Virginia Christian Education Association and has a total enrollment of 89 students in grades Pre-K through 11. Now closed, the Greenbrier Academy, a therapeutic boarding school for girls, was also located in Summers County, in the community of Pence Springs.

== Communities ==
=== City ===
- Hinton (county seat)

=== Magisterial districts ===
==== Current ====
- Bluestone River
- Greenbrier River
- New River

==== Historic ====
- Forest Hill
- Greenbrier
- Green Sulphur
- Jumping Branch
- Pipestem
- Talcott

=== Other places ===
- Brooks
- Buck
- Elton
- Forest Hill
- Green Sulphur Springs
- Hix
- Indian Mills
- Jumping Branch
- Lowell
- Marie
- Nimitz
- Pence Springs
- Pipestem
- Sandstone
- Talcott

== See also ==
- Bluestone State Park
- National Register of Historic Places listings in Summers County, West Virginia
