= National Register of Historic Places listings in Summers County, West Virginia =

Location of Summers County in West Virginia

This is a list of the National Register of Historic Places listings in Summers County, West Virginia.

This is intended to be a complete list of the properties and districts on the National Register of Historic Places in Summers County, West Virginia, United States. The locations of National Register properties and districts for which the latitude and longitude coordinates are included below, may be seen in an online map.

There are 8 properties and districts listed on the National Register in the county.

This National Park Service list is complete through NPS recent listings posted March 21, 2025.

Contents: Counties in West Virginia

Barbour - Berkeley - Boone - Braxton - Brooke - Cabell - Calhoun - Clay - Doddridge - Fayette - Gilmer - Grant - Greenbrier - Hampshire - Hancock - Hardy - Harrison - Jackson - Jefferson - Kanawha - Lewis - Lincoln - Logan - Marion - Marshall - Mason - McDowell - Mercer - Mineral - Mingo - Monongalia - Monroe - Morgan - Nicholas - Ohio - Pendleton - Pleasants - Pocahontas - Preston - Putnam - Raleigh - Randolph - Ritchie - Roane - Summers - Taylor - Tucker - Tyler - Upshur - Wayne - Webster - Wetzel - Wirt - Wood - Wyoming

== Current listings ==
	Name on the Register	Image	Date listed	Location	City or town	Description
1	Cooper's Mill		July 25, 2001 (#01000775)	Off Ellison Ridge Rd. (County Route 27); 37°36′21″N 80°58′40″W	Jumping Branch	
2	Col. James Graham House	Col. James Graham House	March 16, 1976 (#76001946)	Southwest of Lowell on West Virginia Route 3; 37°39′07″N 80°43′52″W	Lowell	
3	Samuel Gwinn Plantation	Samuel Gwinn Plantation	March 8, 1989 (#88002956)	County Route 15; 37°38′55″N 80°43′35″W	Lowell	
4	Hilltop Cemetery		October 25, 2021 (#100006824)	Elk Knob Rd., East Hill Cir., Tomkies Ln. 37°40′16″N 80°53′01″W	Hinton	
5	Hinton Historic District	Hinton Historic District	February 17, 1984 (#84003670)	Roughly bounded by the Chesapeake & Ohio railroad line, James St., 5th Ave., and Roundhouse; also Hill St. 37°40′25″N 80°53′11″W	Hinton	
6	Jordan's Chapel	Jordan's Chapel	February 22, 1980 (#80004042)	Northwest of Pipestem on County Route 18; 37°32′46″N 80°57′38″W	Pipestem	
7	Pence Springs Hotel Historic District	Pence Springs Hotel Historic District	February 27, 1985 (#85000404)	Roughly bounded by Buggy Branch, Buggy Branch Rd., West Virginia Route 3, and Pence Springs Access Rd. 37°41′04″N 80°43′10″W	Pence Springs	
8	Summers County Courthouse	Summers County Courthouse	March 2, 1981 (#81000608)	Ballangee St. and 1st Ave. 37°40′20″N 80°53′29″W	Hinton	

== See also ==
- List of National Historic Landmarks in West Virginia
- National Register of Historic Places listings in West Virginia
