= Battle of Stanaford =

- Part of 1902 New River coal strike
Date	February 25, 1903
Location	Stanaford, West Virginia, United States

Belligerents
United Mine Workers	United States Marshals Service; Raleigh County

Units involved
33 miners 125 outlaws	500 armed citizens 50 US Marshals

Casualties and losses
5–11 deaths	

Photo showing bullet holes from the battle, circled with chalk (1903)

The Battle of Stanaford (February 25, 1903) was an armed raid against striking miners in the village of Stanaford, West Virginia, United States. It was the final episode of the 1902 New River coal strike.

== Prelude ==
Deputy United States Marshall Daniel Webster Cunningham was tasked with serving injunctions on behalf of coal operators to a group of 33 miners who had marched from Quinnimont, Fayette County, to Atkinsville, in present-day East Beckley, during the course of a strike. The miners reportedly threatened him with armed resistance.

Cunningham then withdrew to Beckley, and asked Raleigh County Sheriff Harvey Cook for a posse. Cunningham then went to Charleston, to assemble a group of detectives, while Sheriff Cook telegraphed Governor Albert B. White for troops. The governor instructed Cook to summon a posse of citizens to put down the uprising. Cook summoned about 500 men to appear at the courthouse with their firearms, where they were later instructed to hold themselves ready until the afternoon of that day, or until the sheriff could come to a peaceful agreement with the miners.

Sam Burdette, the United Mine Workers' attorney, accompanied Cunningham and his officers back to Atkinsville from Charleston, and arraignments were made for the men who had violated the injunction, as well as bonds being paid by the union for the striking miners. Sheriff Cook returned to Beckley and told the posse that the trouble had died out and that they were discharged.

However, the strikers had merely withdrawn from Atkinsville and returned to their encampments along the New River at Quinnimont mountain, and some marched to Stanaford, where they were taken in to the homes of friends.

At Lanark, Cunningham assembled a posse of 50 special marshals on the morning of February 25, 1903, accompanied by Sheriff Cook and Howard Smith, a Baldwin–Felts detective assigned to the C&O railroad.

== The raiding party's version of events ==
The Fayette Journal, owned by coal baron Samuel Dixon, reported that "[The posse] left Lanark about 6 o'clock in the morning for the strikers' camp. The mob had taken up headquarters in a school house and had sent a challenge to the officers daring them to come near to serve any papers on the peril of getting filled up with lead."

"The officers had stationed guards around the school house in the night and were aware of the mob's intentions. It is estimated there were about 125 of the outlaws in the house and they all had guns and plenty of ammunition. The officers halted a short distance from the school house and detective Smith and two others went up to the house and called upon the party to surrender."

"For answer the outlaws began shooting at Smith and four bullets were put through his overcoat. One shot struck him on the finger. When the shooting started from the building the officers opened fire and for about five minutes both sides were working every gun and over a thousand shots were fired."

"The fire was too hot for the outlaw gang and about half of them rushed out of the building and surrendered. The others took to the woods where they were pursued by officers, and many of them arrested. Over 50 were arrested."

== An eyewitness accounting of events ==
The Charleston Daily Gazette gave a different description of the battle:

"....It was a dramatic as well as a tragic scene, according to the story of an eye-witness who took no part in the fight, but stood not far away and watched the progress, and who related it to a Gazette reporter yesterday [26 February]."

"'The parties wanted had been located in certain houses in the village, said he, 'and the deputy and his posse went into the camp within a few hundred yards, so as to be ready to make an early morning charge before those wanted could get away. The posse was divided into five parties which marched to different sides of the town and then all closed in at the same time. It was not yet light enough to distinguish anything more that the shadowy outlines of the men when they had gotten a few yards into the town to where I was standing, go to a house, stop a moment then go in."

"Soon afterwards I could see other forms emerge from other houses and run toward the one into which the officers had gone. A moment after I could see the men come from the house, then I saw the flash of fire and heard the boom of a gun, then came its answering boom, and the fight was on."

"'From doors and windows guns were stuck out and fired as soon as stuck. Pretty soon the other four parties joined in the firing and from every side of the town came the flash of fire, the ringing of rifles and the booming of shotguns as the fight became general. Soon I could see figures of men retreating to the woods and firing as they went. A line formed upon a low ridge slightly above the town, and began firing on a party of officers on lower ground. They were answered by a line from another ridge beyond the party in the low ground, but the range was too great, and no damage was done that could be seen. The three men killed were all in one house, and in the house six others were wounded....'"

== UMWA accounting of the events ==
Chris Evans, a UMW official, was dispatched by the organization to investigate the killing of the three black men on the day of the battle. Evans reported that a coal company attorney named W. J. St. Clair had agitated to have the strikers arrested and taken to Charleston. This reportedly led to Cunningham breaking the agreement with the UMW to give bonds for the arrested men, instead opting to go to Atkinsville to arrest the men.

The miners drove Cunningham away from Atkinsville, refusing to allow him to arrest them. Evans claimed that he had sent a report to the men to submit quietly, but that the coal operators who owned all the telegraph and telephone lines in the tow refused to deliver it. Evans charged that Cunningham and his deputies went to Stanaford and killed the miners in their beds at night, before Evans could get a message to the men.

Evans's report after visiting the battlefield said that he found in a house occupied by a black man named Stonewall Jackson, the dead bodies of William Dotson, William Clark and Richard Clayton.

"We found the wife of Jackson and her four children, with eight Negroes, were in the house and that about daybreak all were awakened by shots fired into the house from the outside. This shooting took place without warning and the three colored men were found dead on the floor. Two were in their night clothes and the other one was partly dressed. We visited another house where Joe Hiser lay in bed mortally wounded, he being shot as he was dressing. Hiser lived with his sister and she made the statement at the inquest that she pleaded with those shooting not to kill her children, and in reply Cunningham said: 'Women and children must take care of themselves'."

Evans attested that at no point were the miners ordered to surrender until after the deputies began shooting at the occupants in the houses.

Evan goes on to say that "We next went to the house of Lucien Lausen [Lawson], who was considered mortally wounded[...] this man, with others, returned the fire of the posse and this is the only instance where an attempt of resistance was made by the miners...."

The Labor Leader Mary Harris Jones saw the aftermath of the attack, writing in her autobiography:

"I took the short trail up the hillside to Stanford Mountain. It seemed to me as I came toward the camp as if those wretched shacks were huddling closer in terror. Everything was deathly still. As I came nearer the miners’ homes, I could hear sobbing. Then I saw between the stilts that propped up a miner's shack the clay red with blood. I pushed open the door. On a mattress, wet with blood, lay a miner. His brains had been blown out while he slept. His shack was riddled with bullets.

In five other shacks men lay dead. In one of them a baby boy and his mother sobbed over the father's corpse. When the little fellow saw me, he said, 'Mother Jones, bring back my papa to me. I want to kiss him.'

The coroner came. He found that these six men had been murdered in their beds while they peacefully slept; shot by gunmen in the employ of the coal company."

== Aftermath ==
Between five and eleven men were killed in the battle: 3 being killed outright, and the rest dying later. Casualties named in WV papers at the time include the following:

1. Richard Clayton, shot in the chest,
2. William Dotson,
3. William Clark, shot in the heart,
4. L(ucien) Lawson, died 28 February of infection as a result of his wound,
5. Joe Hiser, died 6 March of his wound, nine days after the battle,
6. Bert Irvin, dying later in the Mckendree Hospital in Fayette County,
7. John Winchester, dying as well in Mckendree Hospital.

A Raleigh County coroner's jury questioned the necessity of the attack: "We, the jury, find the within Dick Clayton and W. Dotson each came to his death by gunshot wounds, and cannot tell whether lawfully or unlawfully, and we further find that the within named William Clark came to his death by being feloniously shot by a body of armed men under the direction of Dan W. Cunningham, United States marshal, W. C. Thurman, W. D. George, W. M. Johnson, J. F. Burgess, C. C. Snuffer, W. T. Shumate.

"The finding of this verdict has created a grave doubt in the minds of many good citizens as to whether or not the actions of those charged with executing the process of the law acted within reasonable limits when the lives of these men above named, were taken, were justified."
