= Lanark (disambiguation) =

Lanark is the county town of Lanarkshire, Scotland.

Lanark may also refer to:

== Places ==
=== United States ===
- Lanark, Illinois, a city
- Lanark, New Mexico, a ghost town
- Lanark, Pennsylvania, an unincorporated village
- Lanark, Texas, an unincorporated community
- Lanark, West Virginia, an unincorporated community
- Lanark, Wisconsin, a town
- Lanark Reef, Florida, in the Gulf of Mexico

=== Elsewhere ===
- Lanark County, Western Australia, a former county
- Lanark, Ontario, Canada, an unincorporated community and former village
- Lanark County, Ontario
- Clydesdale (district) or Lanark, a former local government district in the Strathclyde region of Scotland
- Lanark Loch, a man-made loch in Lanark, Scotland

== Electoral constituencies ==
- Lanark (federal electoral district), Ontario, Canada
- Lanark (provincial electoral district), Ontario, Canada
- Lanark (Parliament of Scotland constituency), disestablished in 1707
- Lanark (UK Parliament constituency)

== Other uses ==
- HMCS Lanark (K669), a Royal Canadian Navy frigate that served in the Second World War
- Lanark: A Life in Four Books, a novel by Alasdair Gray

== See also ==
- Lanark Village, Florida, US, an unincorporated community
- New Lanark, a village on the River Clyde in Scotland
- Adam de Lanark (died 1378), Scottish Dominican friar and prelate
