= Armistead Abraham Lilly =

American lawyer, politician, and businessperson

Honorable Armistead Abraham Lilly
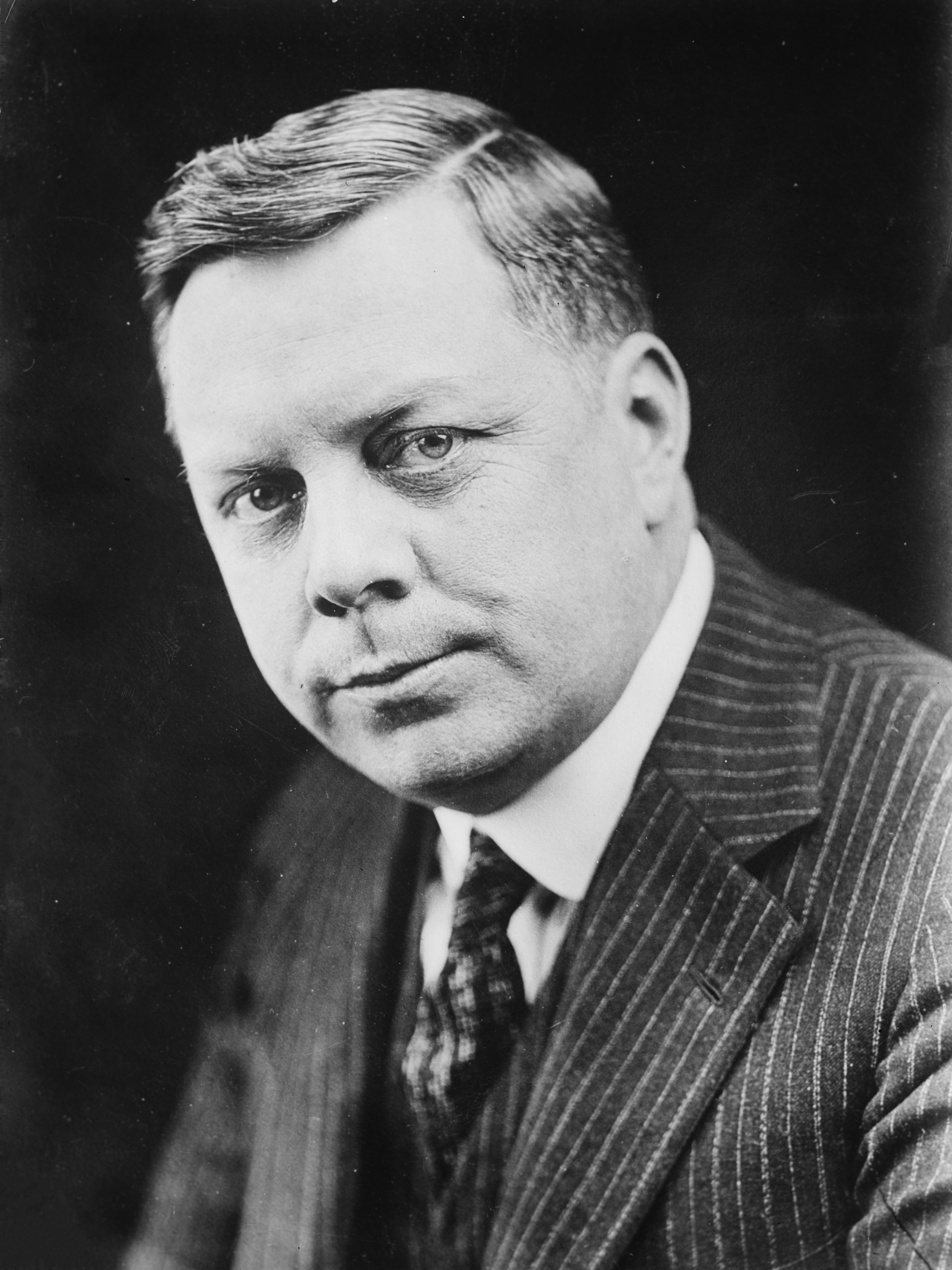

16th Attorney General of West Virginia
- In office March 4, 1913 – March 3, 1917
- Governor: Henry D. Hatfield
- Preceded by: William G. Conley
- Succeeded by: Edward T. England

Prosecuting Attorney for Raleigh County
- In office 1904–1908

Member of the West Virginia House of Delegates from Raleigh County
- In office 1901–1903
- Preceded by: N. A. Snuffer
- Succeeded by: W. S. Steele

Personal details
- Born: March 25, 1878 Jumping Branch, West Virginia, U.S.
- Died: June 21, 1956 (aged 78) Ruffner Hotel, Charleston, West Virginia, U.S.
- Resting place: Sunset Memorial Park, South Charleston, West Virginia, U.S.
- Party: Republican
- Spouse: Mary Elizabeth Glenn Lilly
- Children: Goff P. Lilly; Robert Glenn Lilly; Thelma Lilly Wade
- Parent(s): Robert C. Lilly (father); Virginia Gore Lilly (mother)
- Education: Concord State Normal School; Southern Normal University Law Department (LL.B.)
- Profession: Lawyer, politician, and businessperson

Armistead Abraham "Cousin Abe" Lilly (March 25, 1878 – June 21, 1956) was an American lawyer, politician, and businessperson in the U.S. state of West Virginia. A Republican, Lilly served as the 16th Attorney General of West Virginia from March 4, 1913, until March 3, 1917.

Lilly was born in Jumping Branch, West Virginia, in 1878, and was raised in nearby Raleigh County. He attended the county's public schools and completed high school in Bluefield, then graduated from Concord State Normal School in 1891 and earned his Bachelor of Laws from the Law Department of Southern Normal University in 1900. That same year, Lilly was admitted to the Raleigh County bar and elected to the West Virginia House of Delegates. In 1904, he was elected prosecuting attorney for Raleigh County, a position he held until 1908. Following the 1908 United States presidential election, Lilly was a presidential elector for William Howard Taft.

Lilly unsuccessfully ran for West Virginia's 5th congressional district seat in 1910, losing against James A. Hughes, and was later elected state attorney general in 1912. During his tenure as attorney general, Lilly was involved with the Virginia debt case, railroad rate cases, and cases related to charges of bribery against members of the state legislature. In 1916, Lilly was defeated by 134 votes by Ira E. Robinson in the Republican primary for West Virginia governor. In 1922, he unsuccessfully sought the Republican nomination for a U.S. Senate seat. Afterward, he served as a delegate at several Republican National Conventions, serving as the state chairperson at the 1936 convention. Lilly relocated to Charleston, where he served as president of the Virginian Rubber and Williamson Paint Manufacturing companies, and was primary owner of the Ruffner Hotel, where he resided in the penthouse until his death in 1956.

== Early life and education ==
Armistead Abraham Lilly was born on March 25, 1878, in Jumping Branch in Summers County, West Virginia. He was one of 11 children and six sons of Robert C. Lilly, known as "Miller Bob", and his wife, Virginia Gore Lilly. In 1881, Lilly and his family relocated to nearby Raleigh County, an area which Lilly later referred to as the "lizard glades". Lilly attended the county's public schools, including a school referred to by Lilly as the "Owl River school". Lilly attended and completed high school in Bluefield. He taught as a public schoolteacher for two years in Mercer County and one year in Fayette County. Lilly then attended and graduated from Concord State Normal School in Athens in 1898. In 1899, he began his studies at the Law Department of Southern Normal University in Huntingdon, Tennessee, where he graduated with a Bachelor of Laws in 1900.

== Early law and political careers ==
Following his graduation from law school, Lilly was admitted to the bar of Raleigh County and opened a law practice in Beckley in 1900. He became active with the Republican Party, was a leader of the party's Raleigh County organization, and referred to himself as a "fighting Republican". Also in 1900, Lilly was elected a party senatorial committeeman by Republicans in West Virginia's 7th Senate district. That same year, Lilly was elected to the West Virginia House of Delegates, representing Raleigh County, and he became the youngest member of the house at that time. Lilly served as a house member in the 25th West Virginia Legislature, which convened in Charleston on January 9, 1901, and adjourned February 22, 1901. In 1903, Lilly served as an assistant clerk of the West Virginia Senate.

In 1904, Lilly was elected prosecuting attorney for Raleigh County. While serving as prosecuting attorney, Lilly assisted in having a post office established at Abraham, which was subsequently named for him. Lilly served in this position for a four-year-term until 1908. In August 1906, 7th Senate district Republicans reelected him as a senatorial committeeman at the party's senatorial convention in Bluefield. In January 1907, he was elected a member of the Beckley city council, with 117 votes. Lilly was a presidential elector for West Virginia's 5th congressional district and cast a vote for William Howard Taft following the 1908 United States presidential election.

In March 1910, he formally announced his candidacy for West Virginia's 5th congressional district seat. That same month, the Republican Committee of West Virginia's 5th congressional district agreed upon a delegate convention over a primary election to determine the Republican nominee, with the contest between Lilly and incumbent James A. Hughes. Lilly received 25 declared delegates following a convention of Raleigh County's Republicans in May 1910, and in June 1910, Lincoln County Republicans held their convention, in which the county's 22 delegates were instructed to support Lilly at the congressional district convention. By June 15, Hughes had earned the support of 172 declared delegates, compared to Lilly's 56. At the Republican's 5th congressional district convention in Welch on June 24, Hughes was nominated as the Republican nominee with 216 votes compared to Lilly's 101, and Hughes went on to win reelection to a sixth term in Congress.

== Attorney general ==
In 1912, Lilly was nominated without opposition as the Republican candidate for Attorney General of West Virginia. He was subsequently elected attorney general, receiving 132,452 votes, the highest number of votes of any Republican state candidate. His tenure commenced on March 4, 1913. During his tenure as attorney general, Lilly was involved with the Virginia debt case, railroad rate cases, and cases related to charges of bribery against members of the state legislature. In March 1915, disagreements between Lilly and Governor Henry D. Hatfield over political issues and the operation of state government became public, following reports of Hatfield considering the removal of Lilly from his office. By April 1915, Lilly rendered an opinion that Hatfield could legally borrow money to pay the state's expenses, noting that Hatfield had borrowed money before. However, Hatfield subsequently released a statement in which he denied ever borrowing money to pay the state's expenses and explained that the state did not need to borrow money, as there was no deficit. Lilly's tenure as attorney general ended on March 3, 1917.

=== Virginia debt case ===
During his tenure, Lilly represented West Virginia in the state's ongoing debt suit against Virginia, following the U.S. Supreme Court's decision in Virginia v. West Virginia, 220 U.S. 1 (1911). The Supreme Court ruled in that case that West Virginia was bound by its state constitution to pay one-third of the outstanding debt of Virginia, as of January 1, 1861. However, in 1914, West Virginia's debt commission discovered a series of credits and assets that the state believed reduced its share of Virginia's outstanding debt. West Virginia offered to pay Virginia the reduced 1861 balance of around $2.3 million ($82.42 million); however, Virginia rejected West Virginia's offer. Lilly led West Virginia's motion to reopen the case before the Supreme Court, and arguments commenced in April 1914 in Commonwealth of Virginia v. State of West Virginia, 234 U.S. 117 (1914). In June 1914, the Supreme Court ruled in West Virginia's favor and granted the state's supplemental answer with the discovered assets, which was submitted to a special master appointed by the court. West Virginia's counsel, including Lilly, presented additional testimony in Richmond in November 1914 which was submitted to the special master. In June 1915, the Supreme Court announced its final decree, in which West Virginia's discovered assets were applied to its share of Virginia's debt; however, West Virginia was charged for money and securities it received from the Restored Government of Virginia. When adjusted for principal, interest, and the additional amount owed, West Virginia was obligated to pay Virginia a total of $12.4 million in 1915 ($394.64 million).

== Later political career ==
In December 1915, Lilly formally announced his candidacy for the Republican nomination for West Virginia governor. In 1916, he competed against Ira E. Robinson for the party's nomination. During this campaign, Lilly delivered addresses in almost every county in the state. Despite his efforts, Robinson narrowly defeated Lilly for the nomination by 134 votes. Lilly contested the close election results for the Republican nomination until he and Robinson reached a compromise agreement, in which Lilly agreed to cease his contest of the election results and Robinson agreed to fulfill several of Lilly's conditions.

Following his term as attorney general, Lilly remained in Charleston, where he continued practicing law. In 1922, Lilly unsuccessfully sought the Republican nomination for a U.S. Senate seat. Lilly was a delegate to the Republican National Conventions of 1928, 1932, 1936, and 1940, and served as the chairperson of the West Virginia delegation at the 1936 convention. At the 1928 convention in Kansas City, Lilly presented and delivered a speech in support of U.S. senator Guy D. Goff as a candidate for the Republican presidential nominee.

Lilly and former governor Hatfield continued to engage in a political feud from 1915, each with factions of supporters in Southern West Virginia; however, Lilly ended the feud in 1928 when he came out in support of Hatfield as the Republican candidate for U.S. senator. State senator T. H. Lilly, Lilly's second cousin, subsequently came out against his support of Hatfield's candidacy and in favor of Governor Howard Mason Gore.

== Business affairs ==
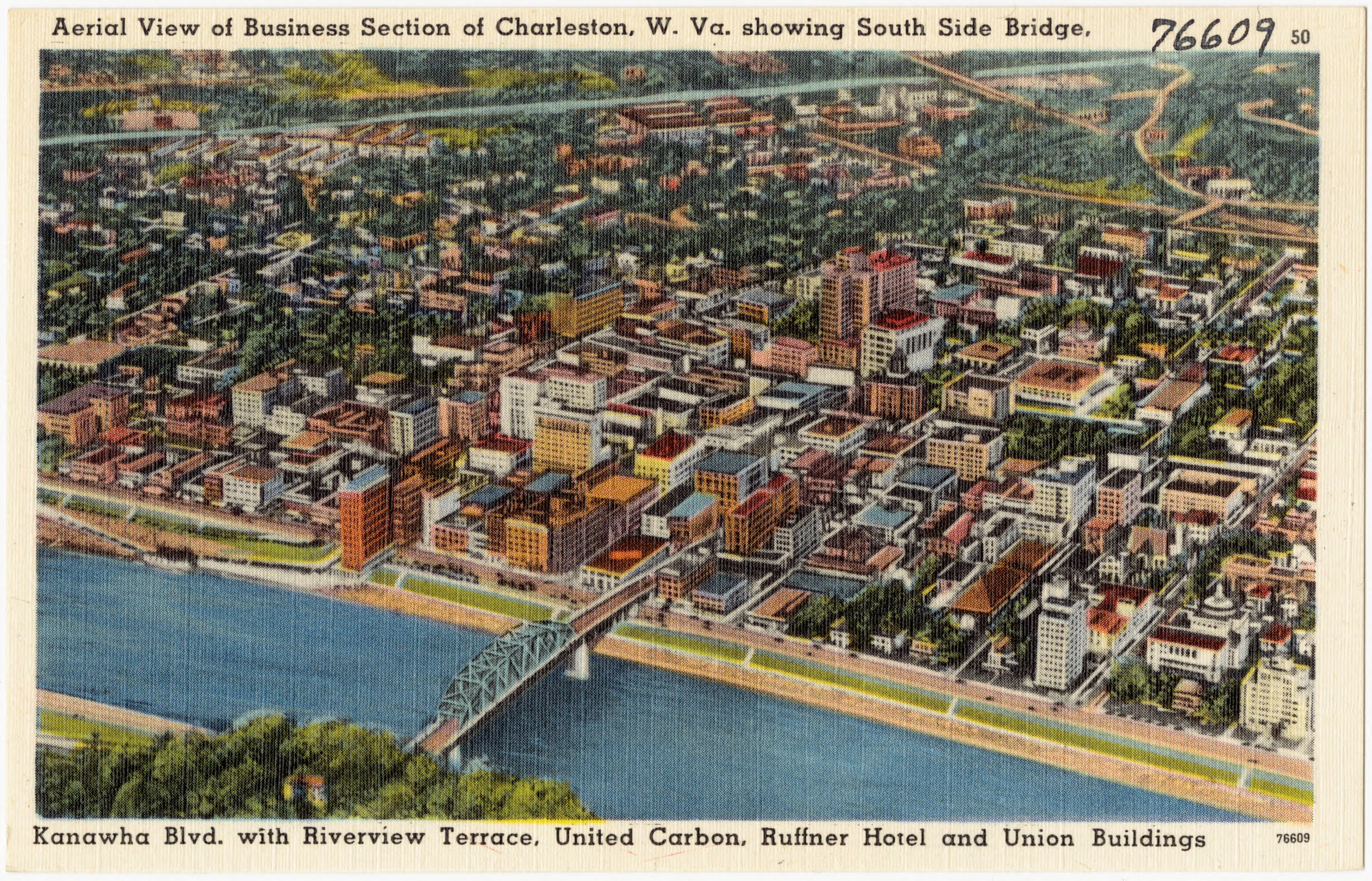
Postcard of Charleston, with the Ruffner Hotel visible to the left of the bridge

In 1918, Lilly was also an incorporator of the Clay County Fuel Company, which undertook the development of coal lands near Hartland in Clay County. The company was sold in 1919. In addition, Lilly was a member of the board of directors of the Virginian Rubber Company in Charleston, and in July 1921, the board elected him president of the company. By 1923, he was the president of the Williamson Paint Manufacturing Company, which manufactured the asbestos roof paint, "Leak Not", and the black metal paint, "Rust Not". The company's plant was located in Charleston at the corner of Watts Street and the Kanawha and Michigan Railway, and it had the capacity to produce 4,000 US gallons (15,000 L; 3,300 imp gal) of paint per day. Lilly was also a principal owner of Charleston's Ruffner Hotel, where he resided in the penthouse in his later years.

== Later life and death ==
Lilly was well known as "Cousin Abe" for hosting an annual gathering of the Lilly family at Flat Top in Mercer County. He organized the Lilly Reunion Association in 1929, and served as the association's first and only president during his lifetime. Lilly and the association held the inaugural family reunion in August 1930 at Flat Top, which exceeded 20,000 attendees on its second day. Notable attendees included U.S. senator Hatfield and Congressmen Thomas Jefferson Lilly, Hugh Ike Shott, and Joe L. Smith. The Hinton Daily News reported that some reunions drew up to 35,000 attendees, and that U.S. senator Robert A. Taft spoke at one of the final reunion events. Lilly held this reunion annually until 1949, with a five-year break during World War II; however, the reunions ceased afterward on account of his ill health. According to the Beckley Post-Herald, Lilly's annual reunion was called one of the largest family reunions in the world.

Lilly suffered illness in the final decade of his life, and he spent most of his time in his penthouse apartment at Charleston's Ruffner Hotel. He died as a result of bronchopneumonia on June 21, 1956, at his Ruffner Hotel penthouse. Lilly's funeral service was held at the Charleston Baptist Temple on June 23, 1956, and he was interred at Sunset Memorial Park in South Charleston.

== Personal life ==
On June 16, 1900, Lilly married Mary Elizabeth Glenn of Arlington, Kentucky. Together they had a daughter and two sons: Kanawha County Coroner Goff P. Lilly, lawyer Robert Glenn Lilly, and Thelma Lilly Wade. While in Charleston, Lilly and his wife built a large residence there, and later resided in the penthouse at the Ruffer Hotel, where Lilly was the principal owner. While in Charleston, Lilly was a member of the Baptist Church and of various civic and fraternal organizations.

In his Bench and Bar of West Virginia (1919), former Governor George W. Atkinson described Lilly as "a man of large physique, and presents a commanding appearance." He further stated, "[Lilly] is a natural orator and never fails to command the attention of an audience."

== Bibliography ==
- Atkinson, George W., ed. (1919). Bench and Bar of West Virginia. Charleston, West Virginia: Virginian Law Book Company. OCLC 8899470 – via Internet Archive.
- Byrne, George, ed. (1915). 1915 Hand-Book of West Virginia. Charleston, West Virginia: Lovett Printing Company. OCLC 1037432215 – via Internet Archive.
- Callahan, James Morton (1923). History of West Virginia, Old and New. Vol. III. Chicago, Illinois, and New York City, New York: American Historical Society. OCLC 373051 – via Internet Archive.
- Harris, John T., ed. (1916). "West Virginia Legislative Hand Book and Manual and Official Register" (PDF). West Virginia Blue Book. Charleston, West Virginia. ISSN 0364-7323. OCLC 1036762543. Archived (PDF) from the original on August 13, 2021.
- Harris, John T., ed. (1917). "West Virginia Legislative Hand Book and Manual and Official Register" (PDF). West Virginia Blue Book. Charleston, West Virginia: The Tribune Printing Company. ISSN 0364-7323. OCLC 1036762543. Archived (PDF) from the original on April 27, 2021.
- Kenny, Hamill (1945). West Virginia Place Names, Their Origin and Meaning. Piedmont, West Virginia: The Place Name Press. OCLC 574551172. Archived from the original on October 26, 2021 – via HathiTrust.
- Lilly, A. A. (1915). Report of A. A. Lilly, Attorney General, In Regard To Virginia Debt Case As Required By Chapter 45, Acts 1907 (PDF). Charleston, West Virginia: Tribune Printing Company. Archived (PDF) from the original on January 24, 2022.
- Miller, James H. (1908). History of Summers County From the Earliest Settlement to the Present Time. Hinton, West Virginia. OCLC 1046585214 – via Internet Archive.
- Randall, James G. (December 1915). "The Virginia Debt Controversy". Political Science Quarterly. XXX (4). New York City, New York. ISSN 0032-3195 – via Internet Archive.

Party political offices
Preceded by William G. Conley	Republican nominee for West Virginia Attorney General; 1912	Succeeded by Edward T. England
Legal offices
Preceded by William G. Conley	Attorney General of West Virginia; March 4, 1913 – March 3, 1917	Succeeded by Edward T. England
West Virginia House of Delegates
Preceded by N. A. Snuffer	Member of the West Virginia House of Delegates from Raleigh County; 1901–1903	Succeeded by W. S. Steele
