= Glenmorgan (disambiguation) =

Glenmorgan or Glen Morgan may refer to:

== Places ==
=== Australia ===
- Glenmorgan, Queensland
- Glenmorgan railway line

=== India ===
- Glenmorgan, Nilgiris

=== United States ===
- Glen Morgan, West Virginia

== People ==
- Glen Morgan (born 1961), American television producer

== See also ==
- Glenmornan, a hamlet in Northern Ireland
- Glyn Morgan (disambiguation)
