= Stanaford, West Virginia =

- Census-designated place (CDP)
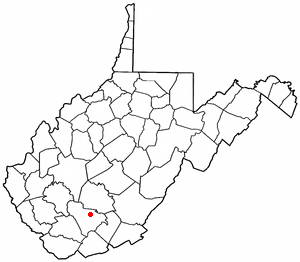
- Location of Stanaford, West Virginia
- Coordinates: 37°48′56″N 81°08′57″W
- Country: United States
- State: West Virginia
- County: Raleigh

Area
  - Total: 1.9 sq mi (5.0 km^{2})
  - Land: 1.9 sq mi (4.9 km^{2})
  - Water: 0 sq mi (0.0 km^{2})
- Elevation: 2,408 ft (734 m)

Population (2020)
  - Total: 1,215
  - Density: 640/sq mi (250/km^{2})
- Time zone: UTC-5 (Eastern (EST))
  - Summer (DST): UTC-4 (EDT)
- ZIP code: 25927
- Area code: 304
- FIPS code: 54-76444
- GNIS feature ID: 2390351

Stanaford is a census-designated place (CDP) and coal town in Raleigh County, West Virginia, United States. The population was 1,215 at the 2020 census.

The community was named after nearby Stanaford Branch.

== Geography ==
According to the United States Census Bureau, the CDP has a total area of 1.9 square miles (5.0 km^{2}); 1.9 square miles (4.9 km^{2}) of this is land, and 0.02 square miles (0.04 km^{2}) is water.

=== Climate ===
The climate in this area has mild differences between highs and lows, and there is adequate rainfall year-round. According to the Köppen Climate Classification system, Stanaford has a marine west coast climate, abbreviated "Cfb" on climate maps.

== Demographics ==
Historical population
| Census | Pop. | Note | %± |
|---|---|---|---|
| 2000 | 1,443 | | — |
| 2010 | 1,350 | | −6.4% |
| 2020 | 1,215 | | −10.0% |
U.S. Decennial Census

At the 2000 census there were 1,443 people, 595 households, and 449 families living in the CDP. The population density was 768.2 people per square mile (296.4/km^{2}). There were 638 housing units at an average density of 339.6/sq mi (131.0/km^{2}). The racial makeup of the CDP was 87.18% White, 9.42% African American, 0.21% Native American, 0.90% Asian, 0.76% from other races, and 1.52% from two or more races. Hispanic or Latino of any race were 0.90%.

Of the 595 households 24.2% had children under the age of 18 living with them, 60.7% were married couples living together, 12.1% had a female householder with no husband present, and 24.4% were non-families. 21.5% of households were one person and 10.3% were one person aged 65 or older. The average household size was 2.43 and the average family size was 2.79.

The age distribution was 19.4% under the age of 18, 8.3% from 18 to 24, 21.1% from 25 to 44, 32.6% from 45 to 64, and 18.5% 65 or older. The median age was 46 years. For every 100 females, there were 87.4 males. For every 100 females age 18 and over, there were 87.9 males.

The median household income was $30,640 and the median family income was $33,750. Males had a median income of $35,313 versus $32,188 for females. The per capita income for the CDP was $16,775. About 11.1% of families and 16.7% of the population were below the poverty line, including 25.7% of those under age 18 and 8.0% of those age 65 or over.

== See also ==
- Battle of Stanaford, 1903, striking miners
