= Warford, West Virginia =

- Former settlement
- Location within West Virginia
- Coordinates: 37°32′15″N 80°54′17″W
- Country: United States
- State: West Virginia
- County: Summers
- Elevation: 1,424 ft (434 m)
- GNIS feature ID: 1556989

Warford is a former settlement in Summers County, West Virginia, United States. Warford was located on the New River, east of Pipestem and appeared on maps as late as 1933.

The community was named for a nearby ford possibly used by Indian warriors to cross the river.
