= Egeria =

The name Egeria may refer to:

- Egeria (mythology), a mythological water nymph and the wife of Numa Pompilius, second king of Rome
- Egeria (pilgrim), also called Aetheria, a fourth-century Christian woman who made a pilgrimage to the Holy Land and wrote a letter about her travels
- HMS Egeria, any one of three Royal Navy ships
- USS Egeria, a U.S. Navy repair ship named after the nymph
- 13 Egeria, an asteroid
- Egeria, West Virginia, an unincorporated community
- Egeria (plant), a genus of aquatic plants
- "Egeria" (Rome), an episode of the television series Rome
- Egeria, a character in the science fiction television series Stargate SG-1
- Dutch investment company, main owner of NRC Handelsblad
- Egeria, an Armstrong Whitworth Ensign aircraft
- Egeria densa, a species of water plant moved in 1857 to Elodea densa
