= Glasgow, West Virginia =

- Town
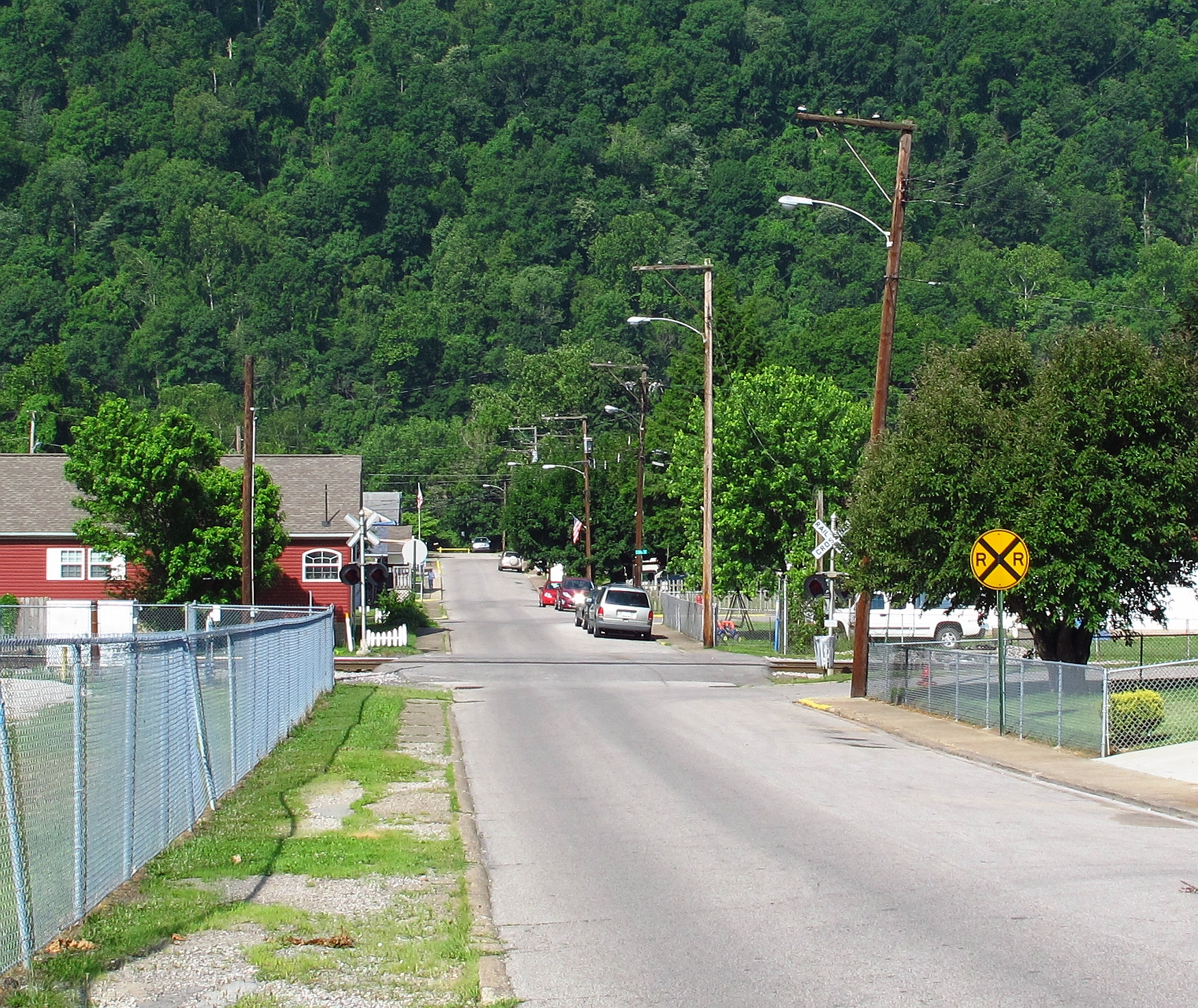
- Looking west on 3rd Street in Glasgow

- Location of Glasgow in Kanawha County, West Virginia.
- Coordinates: 38°12′46″N 81°25′27″W
- Country: United States
- State: West Virginia
- County: Kanawha
- Incorporated: June 20, 1920

Area
  - Total: 0.47 sq mi (1.22 km^{2})
  - Land: 0.47 sq mi (1.21 km^{2})
  - Water: 0.0039 sq mi (0.01 km^{2})
- Elevation: 646 ft (197 m)

Population (2020)
  - Total: 703
  - Estimate (2021): 699
  - Density: 1,788.9/sq mi (690.68/km^{2})
- Time zone: UTC-5 (Eastern (EST))
  - Summer (DST): UTC-4 (EDT)
- ZIP code: 25086
- Area code: 304
- FIPS code: 54-31324
- GNIS feature ID: 1554562
- Website: https://townofglasgow.org/

Glasgow is a town in Kanawha County, West Virginia, United States, situated along the Kanawha River. The population was 708 at the 2020 census.

== History ==
Glasgow was incorporated on June 20, 1920. Folk etymology derives its name from a combination of the word "glass" with the word "company" for a glass factory that was built there many years ago, but the presence of many Scottish immigrants to this part of Appalachia, particularly from the Strathclyde region, indicates that the town was most likely named after the Scottish city of Glasgow in Strathclyde. Other Virginia and West Virginia locations named for places in Strathclyde include Dumbarton, Argyle, Loudoun County, Hamilton in Loudoun County, Lanark and Renfrew.

== Geography ==
According to the United States Census Bureau, the town has a total area of 0.47 square miles (1.22 km^{2}), all land.

== Demographics ==
Historical population
Census	Pop.	Note	%±
1930	614		—
1940	725		18.1%
1950	881		21.5%
1960	914		3.7%
1970	904		−1.1%
1980	1,031		14.0%
1990	906		−12.1%
2000	783		−13.6%
2010	905		15.6%
2020	703		−22.3%
2021 (est.)	699	▼	−0.6%
U.S. Decennial Census

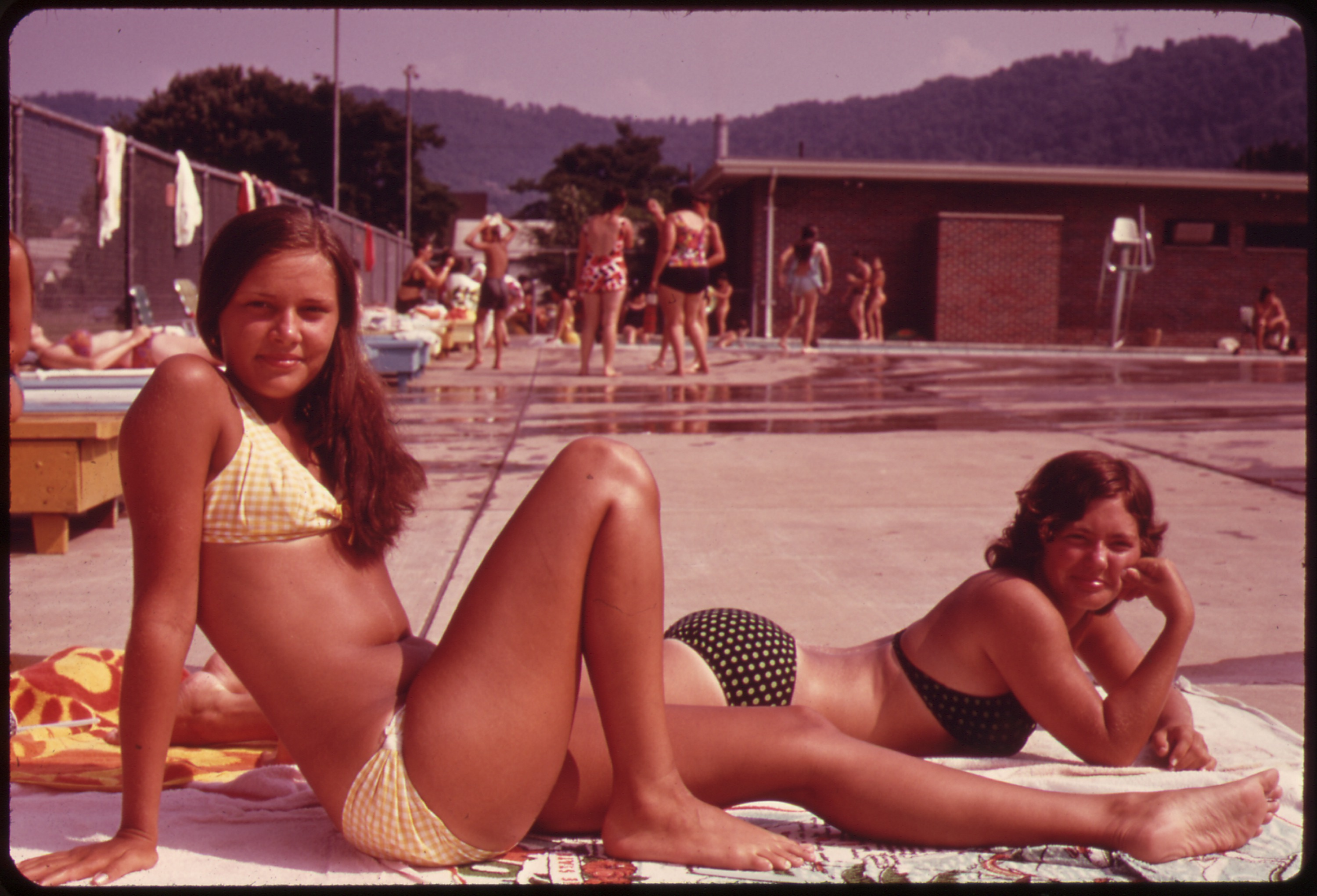
Glasgow swimming pool in 1973

=== 2010 census ===
As of the census of 2010, there were 905 people, 327 households, and 236 families living in the town. The population density was 1,925.5 inhabitants per square mile (743.4/km^{2}). There were 352 housing units at an average density of 748.9 per square mile (289.2/km^{2}). The racial makeup of the town was 97.6% White, 1.4% African American, 0.1% Asian, 0.1% from other races, and 0.8% from two or more races. Hispanic or Latino of any race were 0.3% of the population.

There were 327 households, of which 29.1% had children under the age of 18 living with them, 50.8% were married couples living together, 14.1% had a female householder with no husband present, 7.3% had a male householder with no wife present, and 27.8% were non-families. 22.6% of all households were made up of individuals, and 14% had someone living alone who was 65 years of age or older. The average household size was 2.46 and the average family size was 2.87.

The median age in the town was 47.7 years. 18.7% of residents were under the age of 18; 5% were between the ages of 18 and 24; 23.4% were from 25 to 44; 25.9% were from 45 to 64; and 27% were 65 years of age or older. The gender makeup of the town was 47.4% male and 52.6% female.

=== 2000 census ===
As of the census of 2000, there were 783 people, 327 households, and 234 families living in the town. The population density was 1,774.8 inhabitants per square mile (687.1/km^{2}). There were 351 housing units at an average density of 795.6 per square mile (308.0/km^{2}). The racial makeup of the town was 98.98% White, 0.13% Native American, 0.26% Asian, 0.13% Pacific Islander, and 0.51% from two or more races. Hispanic or Latino of any race were 0.64% of the population.

There were 327 households, out of which 26.6% had children under the age of 18 living with them, and 56.0% were married couples living together. 26.0% of all households were made up of individuals, and 16.2% had someone living alone who was 65 years of age or older. The average household size was 2.39 and the average family size was 2.85.

In the town, the population was spread out, with 20.1% under the age of 18, 8.3% from 18 to 24, 26.9% from 25 to 44, 26.6% from 45 to 64, and 18.1% who were 65 years of age or older. The median age was 41 years. For every 100 females, there were 91.0 males. For every 100 females age 18 and over, there were 83.6 males.

The median income for a household in the town was $35,526, and the median income for a family was $40,500. Males had a median income of $31,442 versus $26,563 for females. The per capita income for the town was $15,632. About 8.8% of families and 10.8% of the population were below the poverty line, including 16.7% of those under age 18 and 10.7% of those age 65 or over.
