= Egypt, Summers County, West Virginia =

Egypt, West Virginia
- Former settlement
- Location within West Virginia
- Coordinates: 37°38′52″N 80°43′12″W
- Country: United States
- State: West Virginia
- County: Summers
- Elevation: 1,585 ft (483 m)
- GNIS feature ID: 1556911

Egypt is a former settlement in Summers County, West Virginia, United States. Egypt was located to the east of Lowell.
