= McVey, West Virginia =

- Unincorporated community
- Location within West Virginia
- Coordinates: 37°42′46″N 81°12′18″W
- Country: United States
- State: West Virginia
- County: Raleigh
- Elevation: 2,270 ft (690 m)
- Time zone: UTC-5 (Eastern (EST))
  - Summer (DST): UTC-4 (EDT)
- Area codes: 304 & 681
- GNIS feature ID: 1555091

McVey was an unincorporated community in Raleigh County, West Virginia, United States. McVey is 2.5 miles (4.0 km) east of Sophia.
