= Cooper's Mill =

- U.S. National Register of Historic Places
- Location within West Virginia Location within the United States
- Location: Off Ellison Ridge Rd. (County Route 27), near Jumping Branch, West Virginia
- Coordinates: 37°36′21″N 80°58′40″W
- Area: 10.2 acres (4.1 ha)
- Built: 1930
- Architect: Lilly, William Calvin; Cooper, Thomas Moody
- NRHP reference No.: 01000775
- Added to NRHP: July 25, 2001

Cooper's Mill, also known as Tom Cooper Mill, is a historic grist mill located of County Route 27 near Jumping Branch, Summers County, West Virginia.

The original mill was built in 1869, and was an 18 feet long by 16 feet wide building constructed of squared logs with "V"-notched corners. In 1930, the original superstructure was dismantled down to the last five log courses, and a 2 1/2-story wood-frame building was erected over the logs and the original sandstone foundation. The mill is sheathed in board and batten siding and topped by a gable roof.

In 1930, a new waterwheel by the Fitz Water Wheel Company of Hanover, Pennsylvania was added to the mill. Also on the property is a blacksmith's shop dated to about 1900.

It was listed on the National Register of Historic Places in 2001.
