= Soak Creek, West Virginia =

Soak Creek
- Unincorporated community
- Location within the state of West Virginia Soak Creek (the United States)
- Coordinates: 37°42′7″N 81°16′57″W
- Country: United States
- State: West Virginia
- County: Raleigh
- Elevation: 2,247 ft (685 m)
- Time zone: UTC-5 (Eastern (EST))
  - Summer (DST): UTC-4 (EDT)
- GNIS feature ID: 1742965

Soak Creek is an unincorporated community in Raleigh County, West Virginia, United States.

The community takes its name from nearby Soak Creek, which originally was called Soak Ass Creek.
