= Hilltop Cemetery =

Cemetery in Hinton, West Virginia, US

- U.S. National Register of Historic Places
- Location within West Virginia Location within the United States
- Location: Elk Knob Road, East Hill Circuit, Tomkies Lane Hinton, West Virginia 24450
- Coordinates: 37°40′16″N 80°53′1″W
- Built: 1875
- NRHP reference No.: 100006824
- Added to NRHP: 2021

The Hilltop Cemetery is a historic cemetery that is composed of five interconnected burial grounds situated along a high ridge overlooking the town of Hinton in Summers County, West Virginia. Together, these cemeteries span roughly thirteen acres along a southwest-to-northeast axis. Although they are part of a unified entity, the burial grounds are physically separated by the winding path of Elk Knob Road and pockets of non-cemetery land.

The site features a wide range of memorial types, from modest headstones to large mausolea, crafted primarily from granite and marble. These monuments showcase a diverse array of styles, shapes, and decorative motifs. Established in 1875, the cemetery saw its final additions during the 1920s. Despite their physical separation, all five areas have historically been known collectively and continue to be referred to as Hilltop Cemetery.

It was listed on the National Register of Historic Places in 2021.

== See also ==
- National Register of Historic Places listings in Summers County, West Virginia
