= Redbird, West Virginia =

Redbird
- Unincorporated community
- Location within the state of West Virginia Redbird (the United States)
- Coordinates: 37°47′22″N 81°26′24″W
- Country: United States
- State: West Virginia
- County: Raleigh
- Elevation: 1,886 ft (575 m)
- Time zone: UTC-5 (Eastern (EST))
  - Summer (DST): UTC-4 (EDT)
- GNIS ID: 1555456

Redbird is an unincorporated community in Raleigh County, West Virginia, United States. It was named after the official bird of West Virginia, the northern cardinal, which is sometimes referred to as a redbird.
