= Shiloh, Raleigh County, West Virginia =

Shiloh
- Unincorporated community
- Location within the state of West Virginia Shiloh (the United States)
- Coordinates: 37°47′58″N 81°23′33″W
- Country: United States
- State: West Virginia
- County: Raleigh
- Time zone: UTC-5 (Eastern (EST))
  - Summer (DST): UTC-4 (EDT)

Shiloh is an unincorporated community in Raleigh County in the U.S. state of West Virginia. Shiloh is located along West Virginia Secondary Route 13.

== Geography ==
Shiloh is an unincorporated community in Raleigh County, West Virginia. The community is located along West Virginia Secondary Route 13 in the central portion of the county. The community lies within the Appalachian Plateau region of southern West Virginia, an area characterized by rugged hills, narrow valleys, and forested terrain.

== Transportation ==
Shiloh is served by West Virginia Secondary Route 13, which provides access to nearby communities in Raleigh County and connects the area to the county's broader road network.
