= Naoma, West Virginia =

- Unincorporated community
- Location within West Virginia Location within the United States
- Coordinates: 37°52′03″N 81°29′14″W
- Country: United States
- State: West Virginia
- County: Raleigh
- Elevation: 1,191 ft (363 m)
- Time zone: UTC-5 (Eastern (EST))
  - Summer (DST): UTC-4 (EDT)
- ZIP code: 25140
- Area codes: 304 & 681
- GNIS feature ID: 1555189

Naoma is an unincorporated community in Raleigh County, West Virginia, United States. Naoma is located on West Virginia Route 3, 7.5 miles (12.1 km) south-southeast of Whitesville. Naoma has a post office with ZIP code 25140.

The community was named after Naoma Pettry.
