= Pinepoca, West Virginia =

- Former settlement
- Location within West Virginia
- Coordinates: 37°47′08″N 81°08′18″W
- Country: United States
- State: West Virginia
- County: Raleigh
- Elevation: 1,827 ft (557 m)
- GNIS feature ID: 1742902

Pinepoca is a former settlement in Raleigh County, West Virginia, United States. Pinepoca was 3 miles (4.8 km) east-northeast of Beckley. Pinepoca appeared on USGS maps as late as 1929.
