= Sylvia, West Virginia =

Sylvia
- Unincorporated community
- Location within the state of West Virginia Sylvia (the United States)
- Coordinates: 37°46′22″N 81°9′40″W
- Country: United States
- State: West Virginia
- County: Raleigh
- Elevation: 2,392 ft (729 m)
- Time zone: UTC-5 (Eastern (EST))
  - Summer (DST): UTC-4 (EDT)
- GNIS ID: 2747596

Sylvia was an unincorporated community in Raleigh County, West Virginia, United States.
