= Samuel Dixon (West Virginia businessman) =

American businessman (1856–1934)

Samuel Dixon (November 14, 1856 - July 6, 1934) was an industrialist and politician in West Virginia. Dixon was among the powerful and wealthy men who helped develop southern West Virginia's bituminous coal bearing-region during the late 19th and early 20th century.

A native of Skelton, Yorkshire, England, he was the son on an ironstone miner. In 1877, came to the United States, the 21-year-old was employed working for his uncle, Fred Faulkner, a mine owner in the rapidly emerging New River Coalfield in Fayette County, West Virginia. Sam Dixon rose quickly in his uncle's company, serving as a supervisor, mine foreman and bookkeeper.

In 1893 at 36 years old, became president and general manager of the MacDonald Colliery Company. During the latter part of the 1890s he acquired a number of valuable coal properties, assembling multiple properties to merge into the New River Company in 1906, and becoming operator of 22 mines in Fayette and Raleigh County, West Virginia.

In addition to land ownership and sale and coal mining and coking operations, the New River Company operated retail coal yards in several cities including Cincinnati and Chicago. New River Smokeless Coal became known across the nation for its quality.

Dixon also built intrastate short-line railroads. He was one of the railroad pioneers of southern West Virginia. notably planning and leading the White Oak Railway, which was owned by the New River Company beginning in 1906. As originally planned, Dixon planned to transport the coal from the New River Company's properties to a river terminus on the Kanawha River where his coal could be loaded into barges to reach mid-western markets via the Ohio River and Mississippi River. Through the Great Kanawha Colliery Company, acquired in 1905 the White Oak Railway acquired access to over a mile of river front property at the head of the navigation of the Kanawha River, where it is formed by the confluence of the New River and the Gauley River. However, the need for deepening of the river channel from 6 to 9 foot draft to accommodate the river barges proved elusive to the New River Company, as federal funds were needed to accomplish the dredging.

The New River Company was also in fierce competition with other coal mining and railroading interests. Dixon was also involved in building the Piney River and Paint Creek Railroad which ran through the City of Beckley to the large Cranberry mine.

As the company developed transportation connections with both the Chesapeake and Ohio Railway (C&O) and the Virginian Railway, some of the directors apparently lost interest in investing additionally in completing the White Oak Railway's system to reach the Kanawha River. Disagreements regarding these plans may have contributed to Dixon's resignation as president and general manager of the New River Company in 1913. The new management of the New River Company moved quickly to disassemble the White Oak Railway, leasing and then selling portions to each of the two larger railroads, transactions which were completed by 1917. The C&O also purchased the New River Company's Piney River and Paint Creek Railroad.

Separate from the New River Company, Dixon gained control of several other mining properties, including the Price Hill Colliery. After leaving the New River Company, he reopened a closed mine, exploiting a new, richer vein of coal than in the past. The town of Price Hill was built for the workers of the Sherwood and Price Hill mines. In its heyday, the Price Hill mine employed 450 men and produced 480,000 tons of coal annually, continuing operations until about 1940, when it closed.

Dixon is credited with naming Carlisle, Parral (currently named Summerlee), Scarbro, and Kelton, all in Fayette County. Although most of the local coal mining operations were largely curtailed by the second half of the 20th century, the New River Company general office building constructed in Mount Hope on land donated by the city remains along with other symbols of the once-thriving coal industry.
