= Princewick, West Virginia =

Princewick
- Unincorporated community
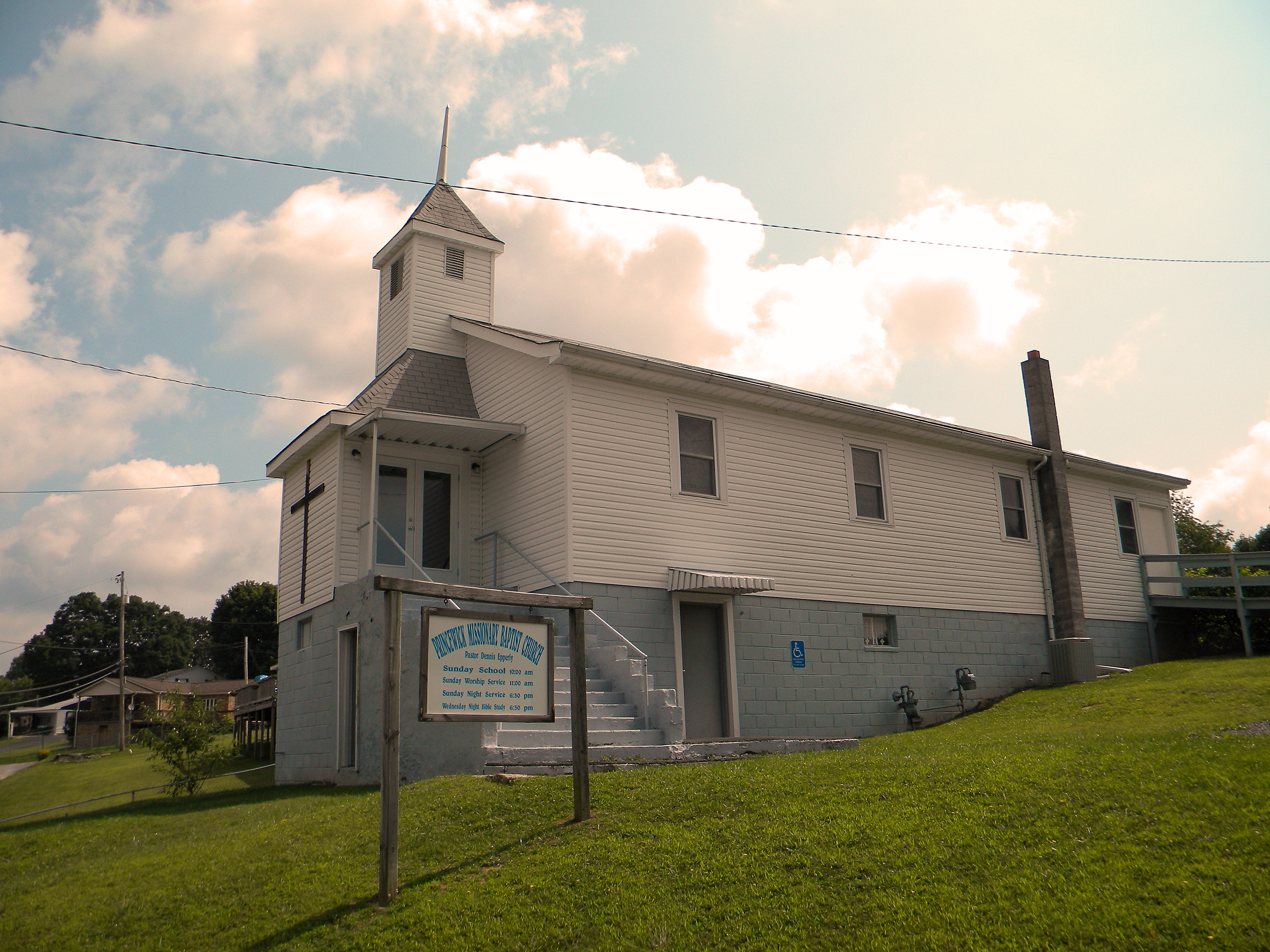
- Princewick Missionary Church, Princewick, West Virginia

- Location within the state of West Virginia Princewick (the United States)
- Coordinates: 37°39′43″N 81°13′17″W
- Country: United States
- State: West Virginia
- County: Raleigh
- Time zone: UTC-5 (Eastern (EST))
  - Summer (DST): UTC-4 (EDT)
- ZIP code: 25908
- Area codes: 304 and 681
- GNIS feature ID: 1555414

Princewick is an unincorporated community in Raleigh County, West Virginia, United States.

Princewick was laid out in 1916 when the railroad (Stone Coal Division of the Virginian Railroad) was extended to that point. The community's name is an amalgamation of Isaac Prince and Thomas Wickham.
