= Abraham, West Virginia =

Abraham
- Unincorporated community
- Location within the state of West Virginia
- Coordinates: 37°47′26″N 80°57′18″W
- Country: United States
- State: West Virginia
- County: Raleigh
- Elevation: 2,471 ft (753 m)
- Time zone: UTC-5 (Eastern (EST))
  - Summer (DST): UTC-4 (EDT)
- ZIP codes: 25955
- GNIS feature ID: 1553688

Abraham is a community in the Richmond District of Raleigh County, West Virginia, United States, that takes its name from an old post office. The name comes from Armistead Abraham Lilly, prosecuting attorney of Raleigh County from 1904 to 1908.

== History ==
Abraham Post Office was established on November 30, 1907, with George Washington Smith Jr. serving as the first postmaster. Mr. Smith served until June 1938. The next postmaster was his daughter, K. Golda Fox, who served until her retirement. At one time there were seven post offices in Richmond District, but by 1976 the Abraham Post Office served the entire area.

Notable People: Command Sergeant Major Basil Leonard Plumley (January 1, 1920 – October 10, 2012) was a main real-life character in the novel and movie "We Were Soldiers... and Young."
