= East Beckley, West Virginia =

Unincorporated community in West Virginia, United States

East Beckley
- Unincorporated community
- Location within the state of West Virginia East Beckley (the United States)
- Coordinates: 37°46′9″N 81°10′19″W
- Country: United States
- State: West Virginia
- County: Raleigh
- Elevation: 2,379 ft (725 m)
- Time zone: UTC-5 (Eastern (EST))
  - Summer (DST): UTC-4 (EDT)
- ZIP codes: 25801
- GNIS ID: 1554349

East Beckley was an unincorporated community located in Raleigh County, West Virginia. Its post office was reopened in February 2014. East Beckley comprised parts of the unincorporated communities of Sylvia and Atkinsville.
