= Jack Whittaker (lottery winner) =

American lottery winner (1947–2020)

- Born: Andrew Jackson Whittaker Jr. October 9, 1947; Jumping Branch, West Virginia, U.S.
- Died: June 27, 2020 (aged 72)
- Known for: Winning the Powerball in December 2002

Andrew Jackson Whittaker Jr. (October 9, 1947 – June 27, 2020) was an American businessman in the construction industry. He was noted for being the winner of a 2002 lottery jackpot. His win of US$314.9 million in the Powerball multi-state lottery was, at the time, the largest jackpot ever won by a single winning ticket in the history of American lottery. After winning the lottery, he was proximate to a number of crimes, and experienced several personal tragedies.

== Powerball win ==
Before his lottery win, Whittaker had been the president of Diversified Enterprises Construction, a contracting firm in Putnam County, West Virginia, for 12 years. Whittaker already had a net worth of over $17 million before his windfall.

On Christmas Eve 2002, Whittaker purchased the winning Quick Pick ticket at a supermarket in Hurricane, West Virginia, where he had stopped for a deli breakfast sandwich and to get fuel for his vehicle. He was not a regular lottery player but bought $100 in tickets because the jackpot was so high. He played the lottery only when it reached $100 million. The jackpot that Christmas Day (before taxes) was a $314.9 million annuity or $170.5 million cash. Whittaker chose the cash option of $113,386,407, after taxes.

== Philanthropy ==
Whittaker pledged 10% of his winnings to Christian charities—including several churches affiliated with the Church of God—in southern West Virginia. One of the beneficiary congregations constructed a multimillion-dollar church in Hurricane. He also donated $14 million to establish the Jack Whittaker Foundation, a non-profit organization that provides food and clothing to low-income families in rural West Virginia. Moreover, for the deli manager who served the biscuits at the convenience store where he purchased the winning ticket, he purchased a $123,000 house and a new Jeep Grand Cherokee and gave her a check for $44,000. He then purchased a Lamborghini and drove it through his neighborhood throwing cash.

== Legal and personal problems ==
On August 5, 2003, less than a year after Whittaker won the lottery, thieves broke into his car while it was parked at a strip club in Cross Lanes, West Virginia. The thieves made away with $545,000 in cash that Whittaker carried around in a suitcase. When asked why he would carry that much money around with him, Whittaker responded, "Because I can." In another incident, two employees at the club, the general manager and a dancer-manager who were romantically linked, were arrested and charged with a plot to put drugs in Whittaker's drinks and then rob him. On January 25, 2004, thieves once again broke into his car, this time making off with an estimated $200,000 in cash, but this was later recovered.

On September 16, 2004, Jesse Tribble, an 18-year-old on-and-off-again boyfriend of Whittaker's granddaughter Brandi Bragg, was found dead in Whittaker's home in Teays Valley, West Virginia. A coroner's report indicated that he had died from overdosing on a combination of oxycodone, methadone, meperidine, and cocaine.

On December 20, 2004, Brandi Bragg, Whittaker’s 17-year-old granddaughter, was found dead on the property of a male friend after being reported missing on December 9. Her body was wrapped in a plastic tarpaulin and dumped behind a junked van. Cocaine and methadone were found in her system, but the cause of death was listed as "undetermined". No one was charged with a crime. Her boyfriend speculated that she overdosed.

On October 11, 2005, at a hearing related to his January 2003 DUI, a visibly shaken Whittaker lashed out at local law enforcement agencies for focusing on his troubles while failing to arrest anyone in relation to his granddaughter's death, saying, "Go after whoever killed my granddaughter with as much zealous [sic] as these butt holes are trying to convict me of something I didn't do."

Whittaker was later sued by Caesars Atlantic City casino for bouncing $1.5 million worth of checks to cover gambling losses. He countersued, claiming that his losses were supposed to be credited due to a slot machine he developed and that they, in fact, owed him money.

On January 11, 2007, a legal complaint against Whittaker alleged he claimed that on September 11, 2006, thieves took all of his money. The thieves, according to the account, went to 12 branches of the City National Bank and cashed 12 checks. The incident came to light because Whittaker had not been paying money to a woman who had previously sued him. Kitti French filed the complaint earlier in the week, requesting court costs and money from Whittaker.

On July 5, 2009, Ginger Whittaker Bragg, Whittaker's 42-year-old daughter and the mother of Brandi Bragg, was found dead in Daniels, West Virginia. No explanation was given, but officials did not suspect foul play.

On December 2, 2016, at around 7 a.m. Whittaker's home in Bland County, Virginia was reported to be on fire. When firefighters arrived, the home was fully engulfed, and the house was deemed a total loss. Whittaker's wife was home when the fire broke out, but she was able to make it out safely and no injuries were reported. Whittaker stated that the home was not insured.

== Death ==
Whittaker died on June 27, 2020, aged 72, following a long illness; no further details surrounding his death were provided.
