= Jordan's Chapel =

Historic church in West Virginia, United States

- U.S. National Register of Historic Places
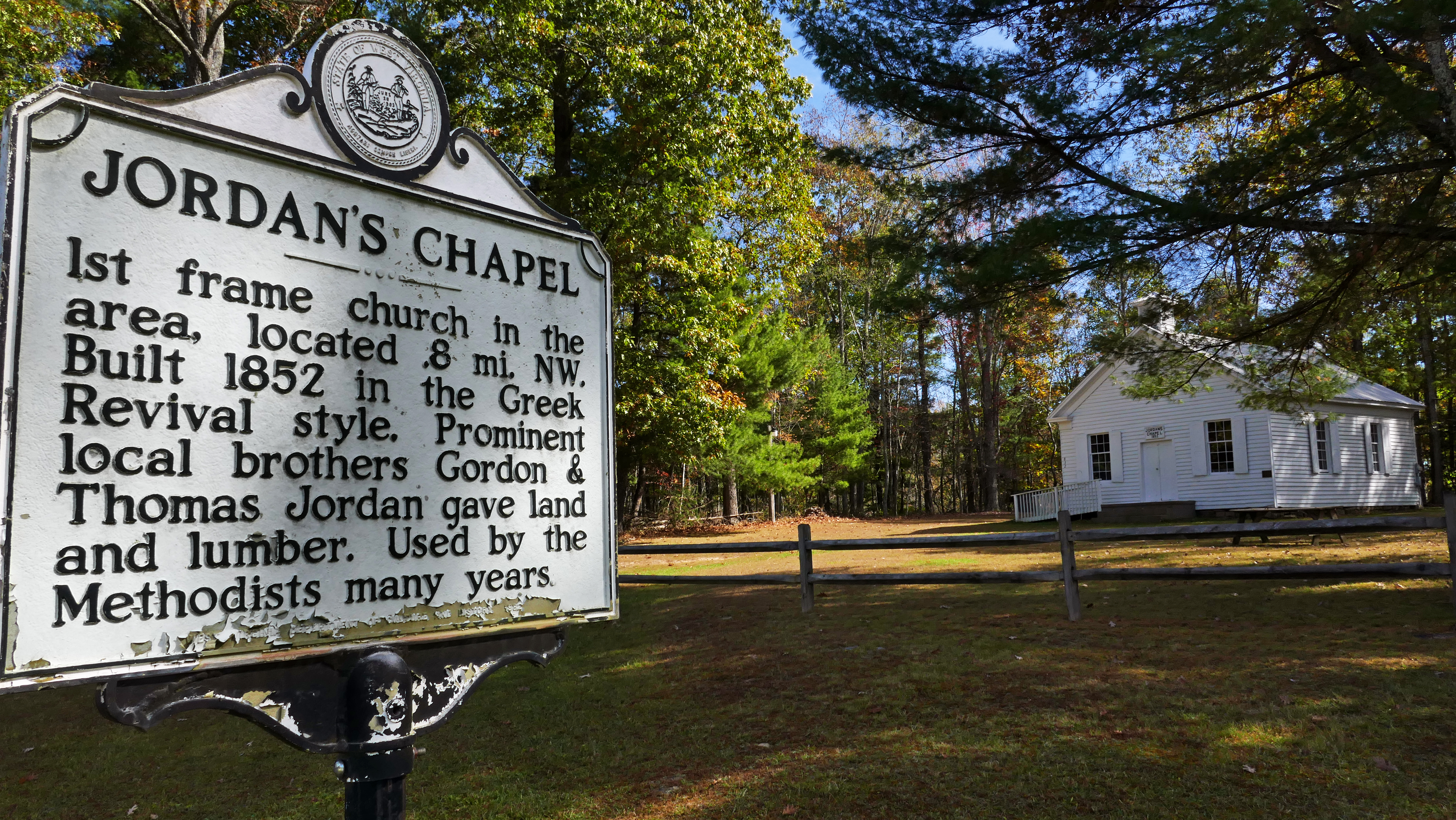

- Location within West Virginia Location within the United States
- Location: Northwest of Pipestem on County Route 18, near Pipestem, West Virginia
- Coordinates: 37°32′46″N 80°57′38″W
- Area: 1 acre (0.40 ha)
- Built: 1852
- Architectural style: Greek Revival
- NRHP reference No.: 80004042
- Added to NRHP: February 22, 1980

Jordan's Chapel is a historic Methodist chapel located near Pipestem, Summers County, West Virginia. It was built in 1852, and is a rectangular frame structure in the Greek Revival style. It features a small louvered belfry with a louvered pyramidal roof.

It was listed on the National Register of Historic Places in 1980.
