= Woodpeck, West Virginia =

- Unincorporated community
- Location within West Virginia Location within the United States
- Coordinates: 37°41′36″N 81°11′46″W
- Country: United States
- State: West Virginia
- County: Raleigh
- Elevation: 2,277 ft (694 m)
- Time zone: UTC-5 (Eastern (EST))
  - Summer (DST): UTC-4 (EDT)
- Area codes: 304 & 681
- GNIS feature ID: 1556023

Woodpeck is an unincorporated community in Raleigh County, West Virginia, United States. Woodpeck is 3 miles (4.8 km) east-southeast of Sophia.
