= Lanark Reef =

- Location within Florida Location within the United States

Location
- Location: Gulf of Mexico
- Coordinates: 29.872°N 84.588°W
- Country: United States

Geology
- Type: reef

Lanark Reef is a partially submerged area on Gulf of Mexico coast in Franklin County, Florida. The tidal area includes sea oats and is inhabited by shorebirds. It is one mile south of Lanark Village and provides habitat for the piping plover. A parcel of private land in the Lanark Reef was secured by the Audubon Society in October, 2012 to help protect it as a refuge for shorebirds.

== See also ==
- Dog Island
