= Quinnimont, West Virginia =

- Unincorporated community
- Location within West Virginia Location within the United States
- Coordinates: 37°51′16″N 81°02′40″W
- Country: United States
- State: West Virginia
- County: Fayette
- Elevation: 1,266 ft (386 m)
- Time zone: UTC-5 (Eastern (EST))
  - Summer (DST): UTC-4 (EDT)
- Area codes: 304 & 681
- GNIS feature ID: 1545353

Quinnimont is an unincorporated community in Fayette County, West Virginia, United States. Quinnimont is located on West Virginia Route 41 near the New River, 7.1 miles (11.4 km) east-southeast of Mount Hope. Quinnimont had a post office, which opened on February 23, 1874, and closed on February 1, 1997.

The community was so named because of the five mountains near the town site.
