= Stanaford Branch =

Stream in West Virginia, U.S.

Coordinates: 37°49′22″N 81°08′02″W

Stanaford Branch is a stream in the U.S. state of West Virginia.

Stanaford Branch most likely derives its name from the surname Stanford.

== See also ==
- List of rivers of West Virginia
