= Charleston Baptist Temple =

Historic church in West Virginia, United States

- U.S. National Register of Historic Places
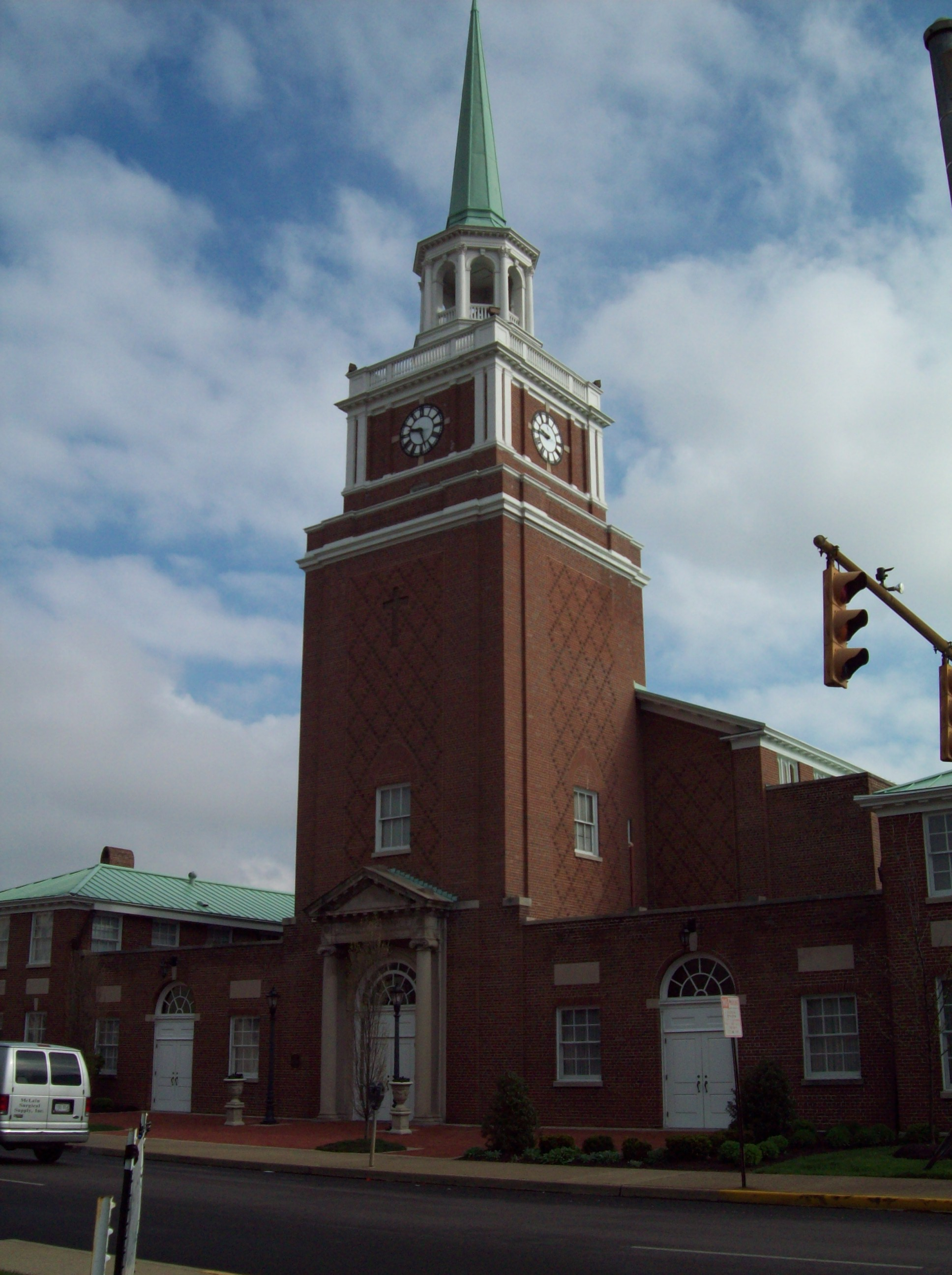
- Charleston Baptist Temple, April 2009

- Location within West Virginia Location within the United States
- Location: 209 Morris St., Charleston, West Virginia
- Coordinates: 38°20′43″N 81°37′44″W
- Built: 1924
- Architect: Flagg, Ernest
- Architectural style: Colonial Revival
- NRHP reference No.: 00000252
- Added to NRHP: April 04, 2000

Charleston Baptist Temple is a historic Baptist church located at Charleston, West Virginia. It is a two-story, brick church with Georgian and Federal style details. It was designed by architect Ernest Flagg and constructed in 1924. It is composed of a central sanctuary block with matching wings and a rear addition constructed in 1955. The facade features a central tower, which contains the steeple. The spire is copper-clad and flares out to cover an open belfry with decorated engaged Corinthian columns and arched openings. Directly below the belfry is a baluster area above the clock portion of the tower.

It was listed on the National Register of Historic Places in 2000.

== Gallery ==
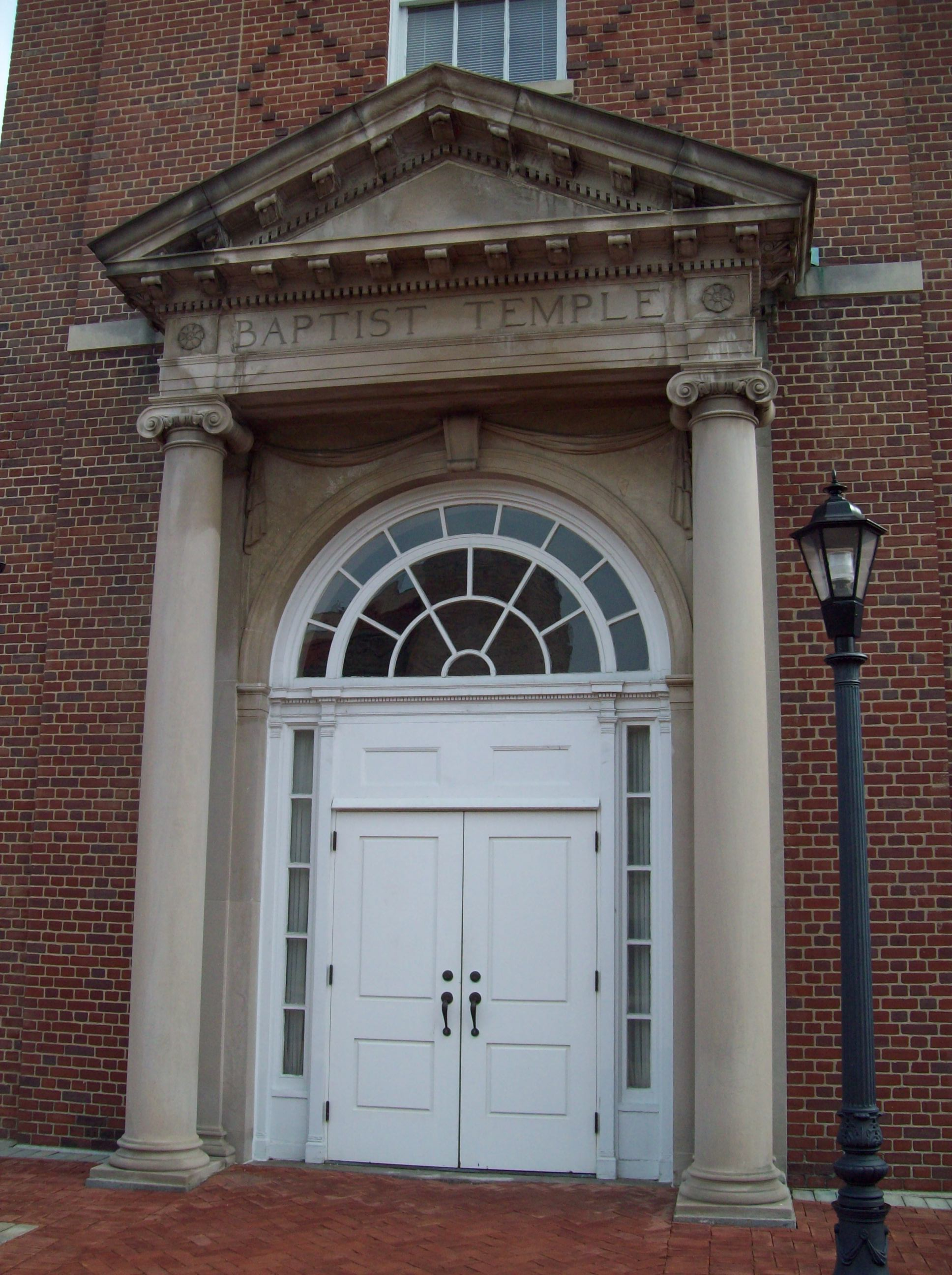
Charleston Baptist Temple entry, April 2009
