= Glen Morgan, West Virginia =

Unincorporated community in West Virginia, United States

Glen Morgan
- Unincorporated community
- Location within the state of West Virginia Glen Morgan (the United States)
- Coordinates: 37°45′26″N 81°9′25″W
- Country: United States
- State: West Virginia
- County: Raleigh
- Time zone: UTC-5 (Eastern (EST))
  - Summer (DST): UTC-4 (EDT)
- GNIS ID: 1554567

Glen Morgan is an unincorporated community in Raleigh County, West Virginia, United States.
