= Egeria, West Virginia =

Unincorporated community in West Virginia, United States

- Unincorporated community
- Location within West Virginia Location within the United States
- Coordinates: 37°32′21″N 81°12′00″W
- Country: United States
- State: West Virginia
- Counties: Mercer and Raleigh
- Elevation: 2,972 ft (906 m)
- Time zone: UTC-5 (Eastern (EST))
  - Summer (DST): UTC-4 (EDT)
- Area codes: 304 & 681
- GNIS feature ID: 1549668

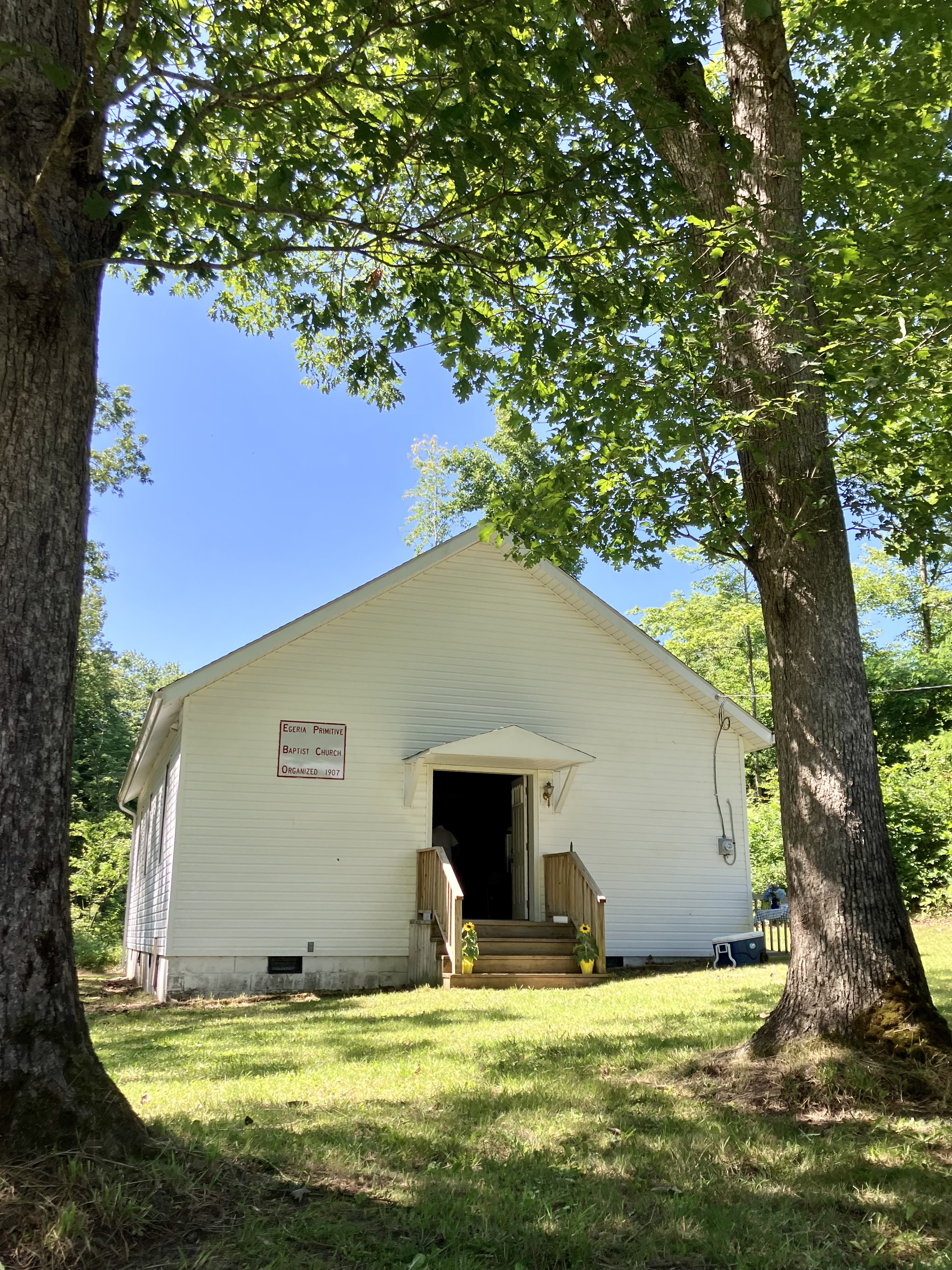
Primitive Baptist Church, established 1907

Egeria is an unincorporated community in Mercer and Raleigh counties, West Virginia, United States. Egeria is 8.5 miles (13.7 km) north-northeast of Matoaka. The 1881 guide to the Chesapeake and Ohio Railway lists a blacksmith, two cabinetmakers or undertakers, a general store, a machinist, corn or flour mill, sawmill, and nine "principal farmers".

The community had a post office as of 1955. The Egeria high school, which was built in 1913, was the last single-teacher high school in West Virginia. It had 21 total students at its peak, and enrollment numbers were usually in the teens, making it the smallest school in the county; in 1954 it had only two graduates. At the time, the community was cut off from surrounding towns by poor-quality roads, which slowed local progress and led younger residents to move away.
