= Samuel Gwinn Plantation =

Historic house in West Virginia, United States

- U.S. National Register of Historic Places
- U.S. Historic district
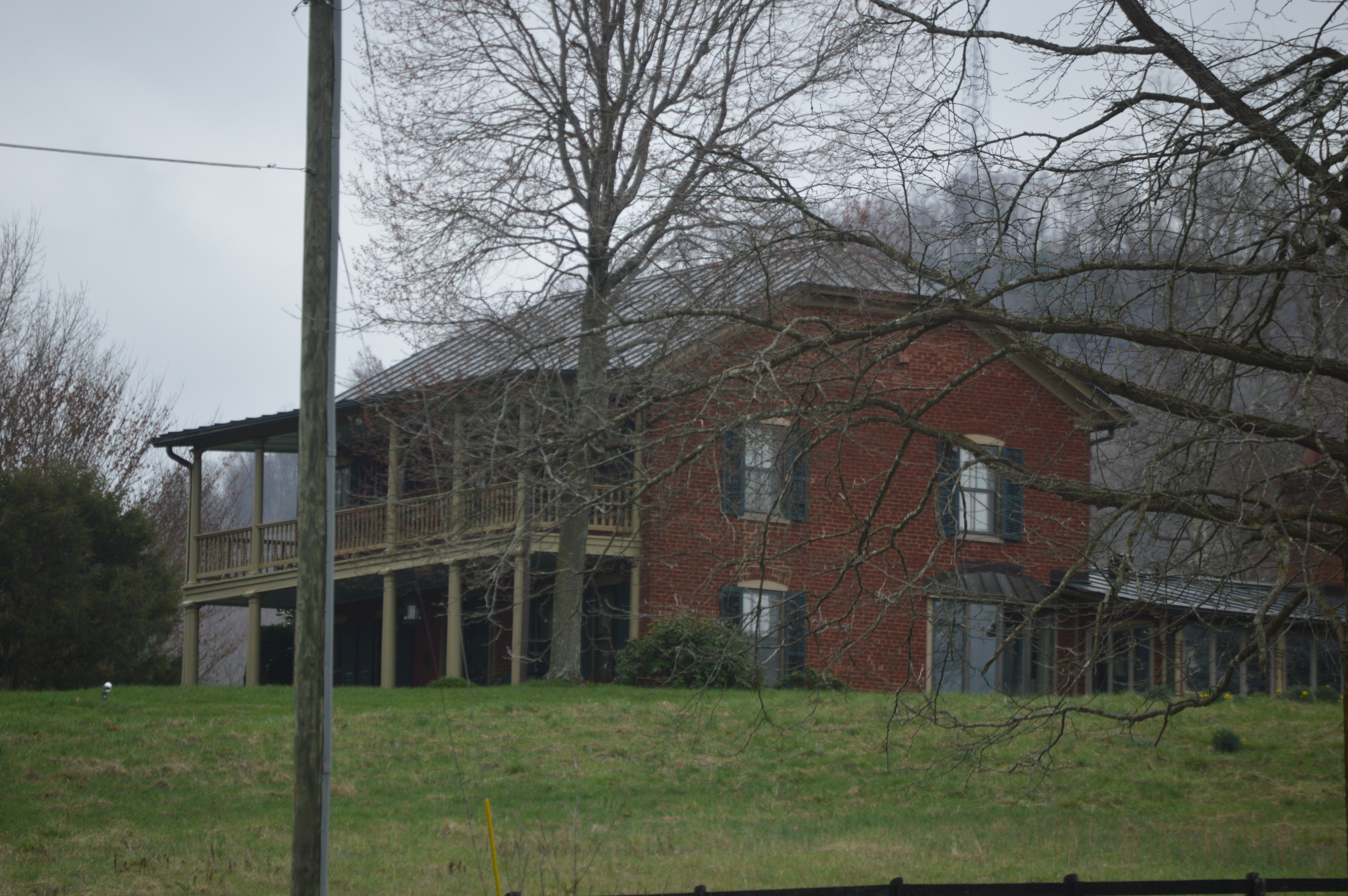
- Plantation house

- Location within West Virginia Location within the United States
- Nearest city: Lowell, West Virginia
- Coordinates: 37°38′55″N 80°43′35″W
- Area: 3.8 acres (1.5 ha)
- Built: 1770
- Architect: Silas F. Taylor
- Architectural style: Greek Revival, Italianate
- NRHP reference No.: 88002956
- Added to NRHP: March 8, 1989

The Samuel Gwinn Plantation is a historic plantation in Lowell, West Virginia. The main house was built in circa 1868, although the plantation was begun in the late 18th Century, with secondary structures, such as the meat curing house, dating to the 1770s. It was added to the National Register of Historic Places on March 8, 1989.
