= Col. James Graham House =

Historic house in West Virginia, United States

- U.S. National Register of Historic Places
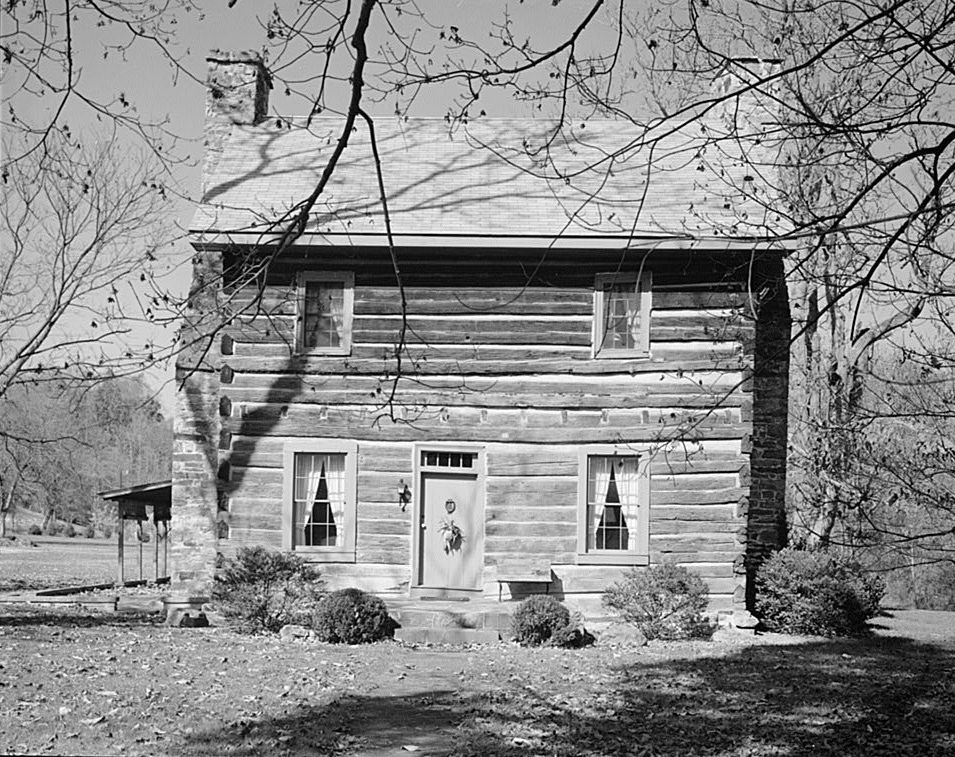
- Southwest front of the house, seen in 1974

- Location within West Virginia Location within the United States
- Nearest city: Lowell, West Virginia
- Coordinates: 37°39′7″N 80°43′52″W
- Area: 1 acre (0.40 ha)
- Built: 1770
- Architect: Graham, Col. James
- Architectural style: Log Cabin
- NRHP reference No.: 76001946
- Added to NRHP: March 16, 1976

The Col. James Graham House is a historic log cabin located on West Virginia Route 3 in Lowell, West Virginia. It was built in 1770 as a home for Col. James Graham, the first settler of Lowell, and his family. It was later the site of an Indian attack on the Graham family in 1777. The house was added to the National Register of Historic Places on March 16, 1976. The Graham House is the oldest multi-story log cabin in West Virginia. It is currently operating as a museum.

== History ==
James Graham and his family built the cabin in 1770 after migrating to the area from elsewhere in Virginia. As the Grahams were the first permanent settlers in the region, the Graham House became the first established home in what is now Summers County. The log house, with a 25-by-28-foot (7.6 by 8.5 m) exterior, was significantly larger than other pioneer cabins of the period. The Graham family settled into a life of farming in the home upon its completion. In 1777, Native Americans attacked the Graham House, killing Col. Graham's son John, a neighbor of the Grahams named McDonald, and a young slave boy as well as kidnapping Col. Graham's daughter Elizabeth. The family did not successfully ransom Elizabeth until 1785.

The Graham House remained in the Graham family until 1860. After 1860, several other families inhabited the cabin, including Col. Wilson Lively's family and Mr. and Mrs. Lewis E. Barickman. The last residents of the house (from 1976 - 1986) were Eileen and Bill Muhly, Jr. and their six children. The youngest two, twins Mary Elizabeth and James Arthur Bertram were born while the family resided there. The house is currently owned by the Graham House Preservation Society and operated as a museum.

== Description ==
The Graham House is notable as being a particularly large house compared to other log cabins of the period. The exterior of the house measures 25 feet (7.6 m) by 28 feet (8.5 m), and the cabin consists of two floors and an attic, including a 12-foot (3.7 m) ceiling. The house is built of poplar, walnut, and oak logs, with stones used as additional supports. Large stone chimneys are located at either end of the house. The house was likely built with a single door and no windows, but an additional door and several windows were added at a later date. The first floor consists of a single room, and at one point was split into three rooms; the second floor has three rooms. The house's original outbuildings were eventually replaced by additions on the north side of the house, the latest of which was built in the 1970s and includes bathing and kitchen areas.

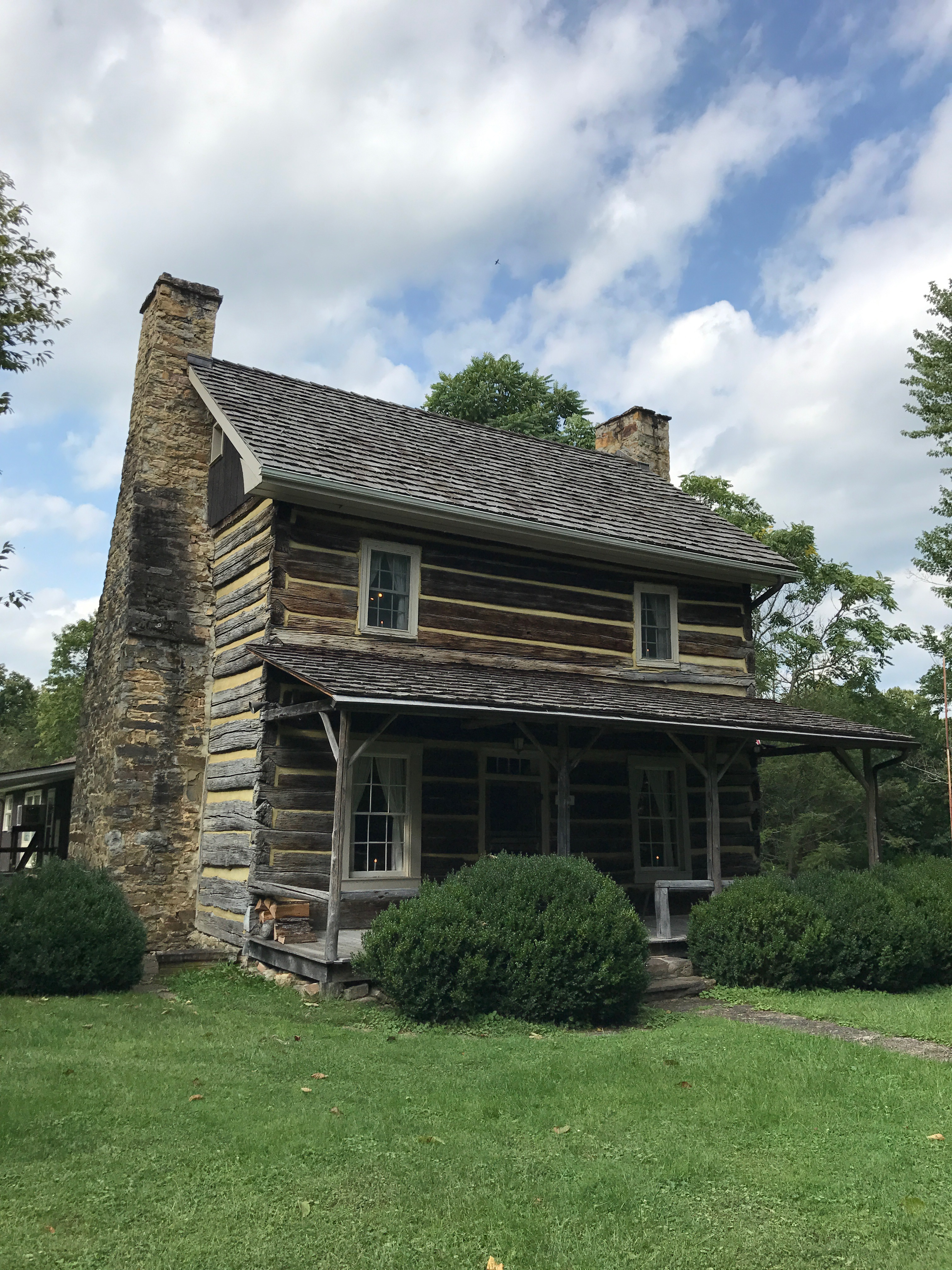
Graham House in 2017

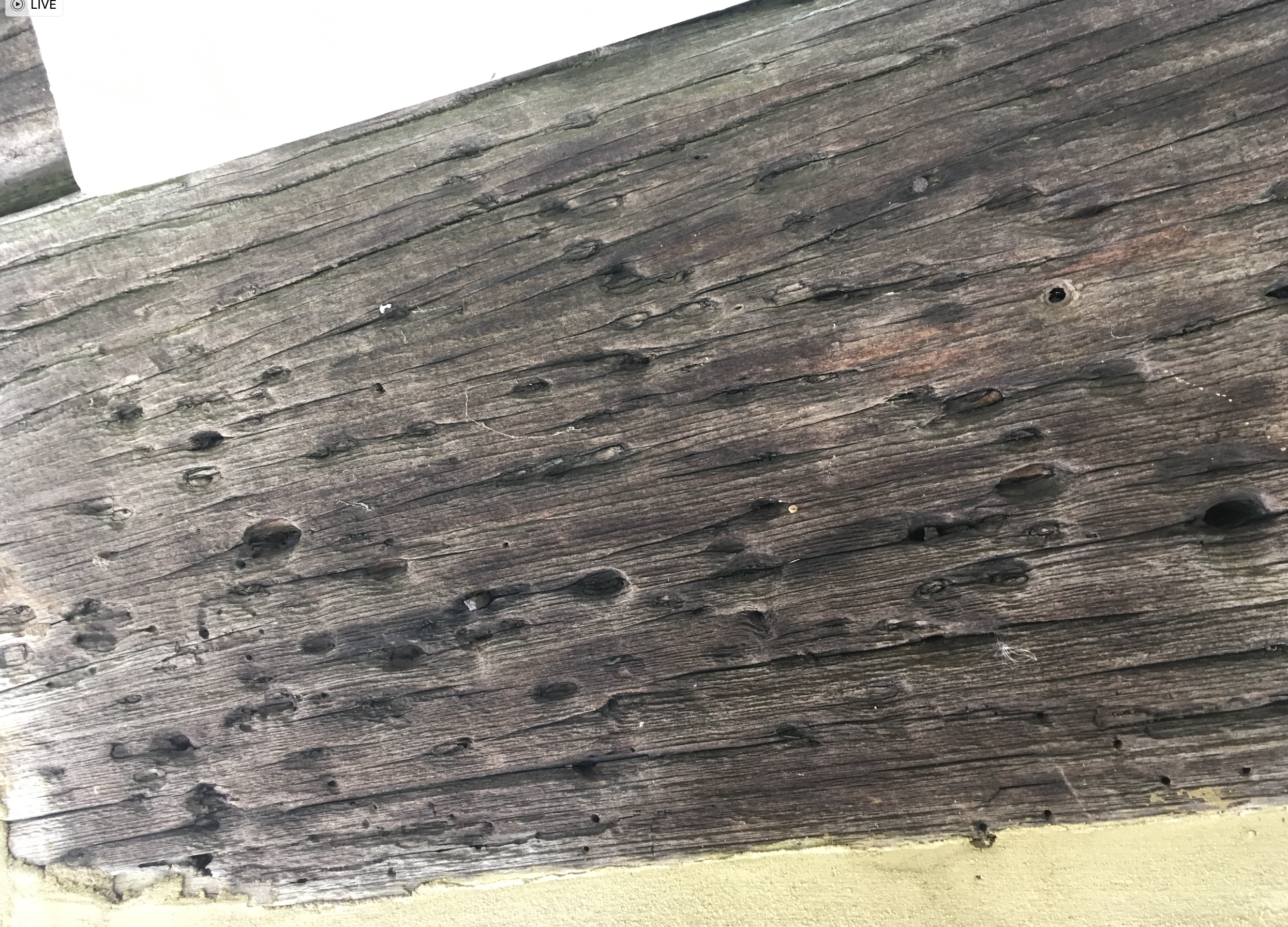
Bullet holes in door frame from Indian raid

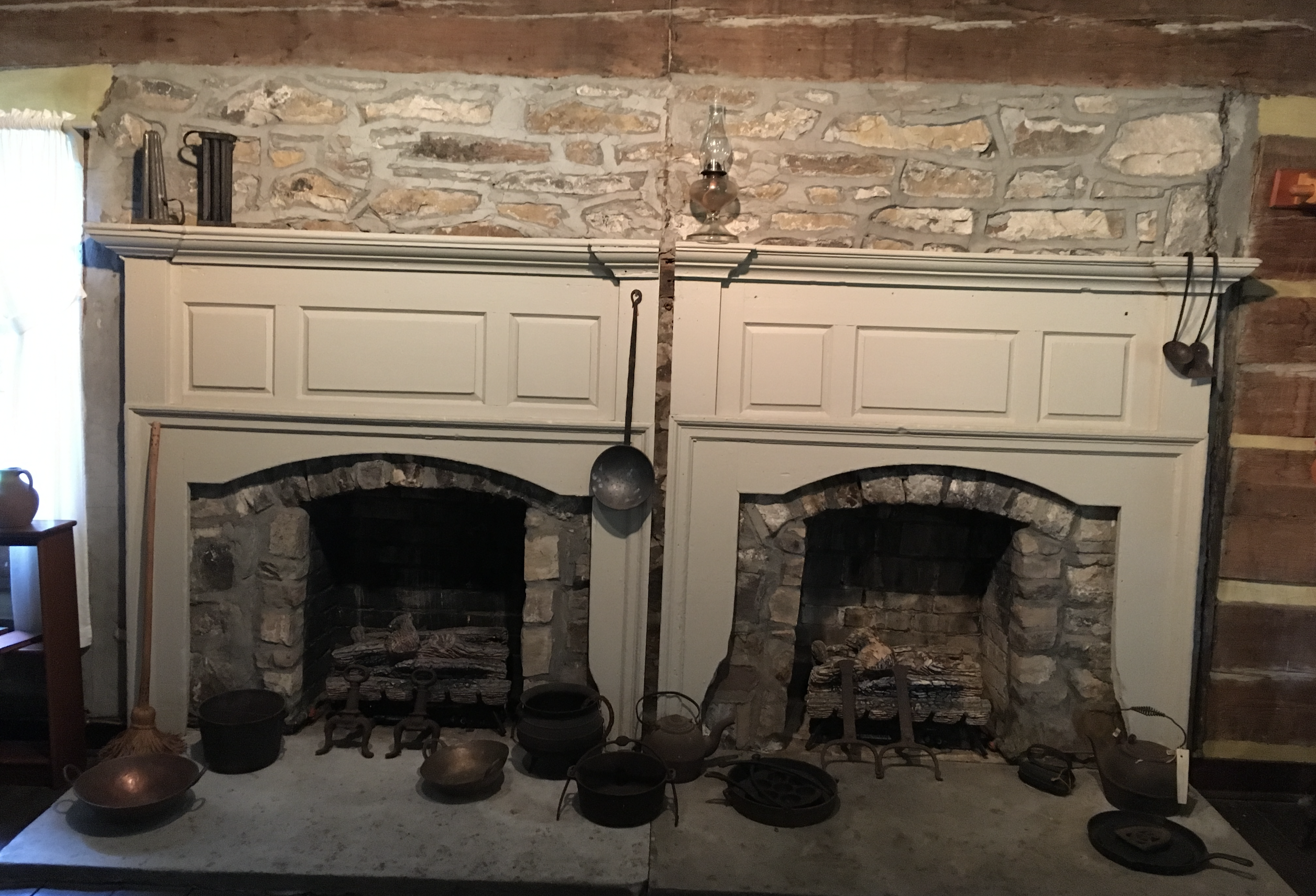
Dual hearths in downstairs living room

== Museum ==
The Graham House is currently operated as a private museum, with tours given during summer months on weekends. The house is also used as a venue for community events such as dinners, festivals, and reunions.

On the same property as the Graham House lies the Saunders One Room School House Museum. The school house, while not an original school building, allows visitors to see an example of a one-room school house. The property also houses a barn which contains many pieces of old farm equipment.
