= Jumping Branch, West Virginia =

- Unincorporated community
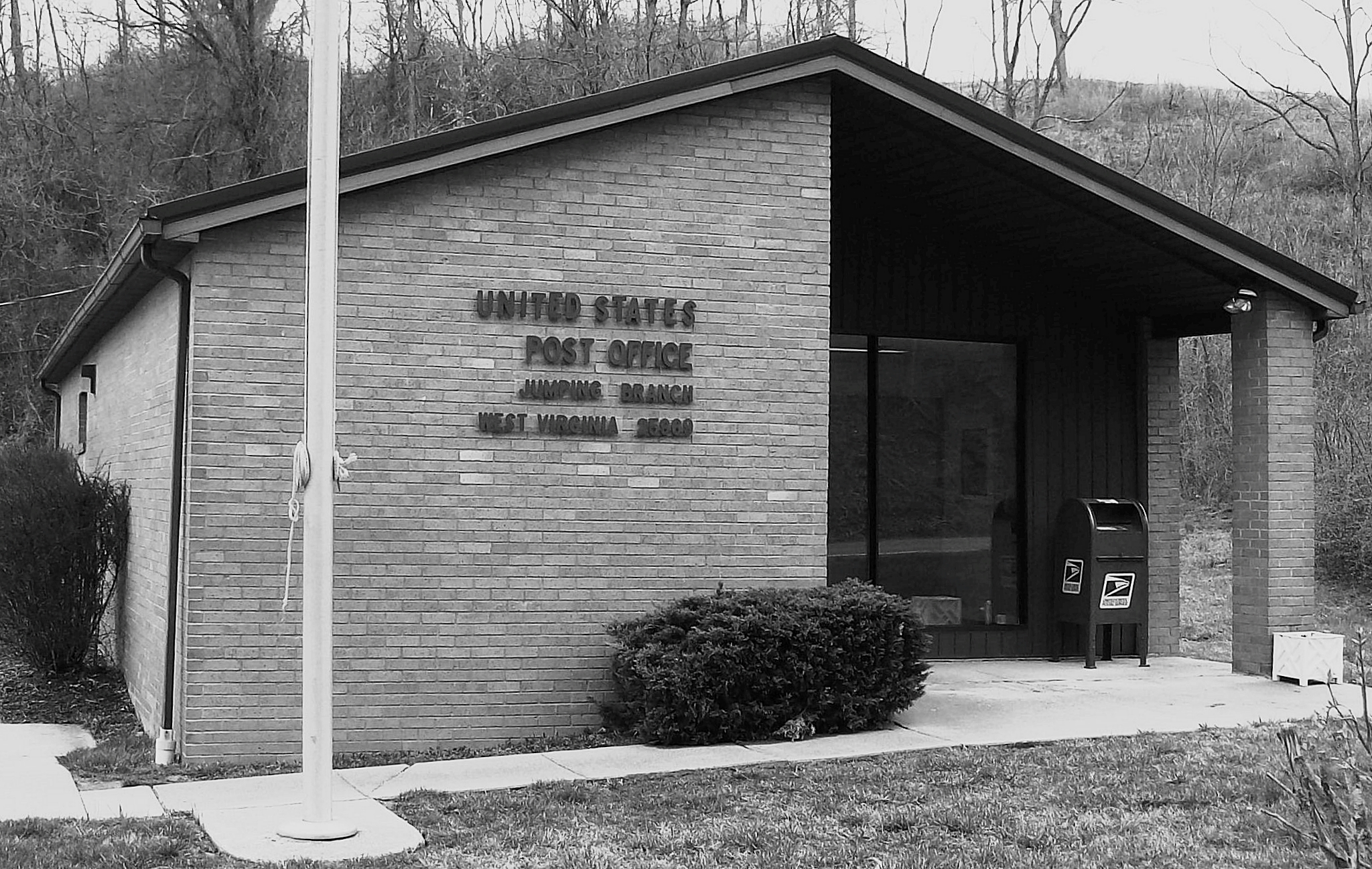
- Jumping Branch West Virginia Post Office

- Location within West Virginia Location within the United States
- Coordinates: 37°39′27″N 80°58′35″W
- Country: United States
- State: West Virginia
- County: Summers
- Elevation: 2,297 ft (700 m)
- Time zone: UTC-5 (Eastern (EST))
  - Summer (DST): UTC-4 (EDT)
- ZIP code: 25969
- Area codes: 304 & 681
- GNIS feature ID: 1541044

Jumping Branch is an unincorporated community in Summers County, West Virginia, United States, located west of Hinton. The name Jumping Branch originated as settlers had to cross a stream to enter the area by crossing over a fallen tree before it was bridged. The Lilly Crews cemetery is located there as well. Jumping Branch has a post office with ZIP code 25969.

A portion of the Giles-Fayette and Kanawha Turnpike ran through Jumping Branch. The route is unverifiable.

== Notable people ==
- Armistead Abraham Lilly, lawyer, businessman, and politician, was born in Jumping Branch.
- Jack Whittaker, 2002 Powerball lottery winner, was born in Jumping Branch.

== Gallery ==
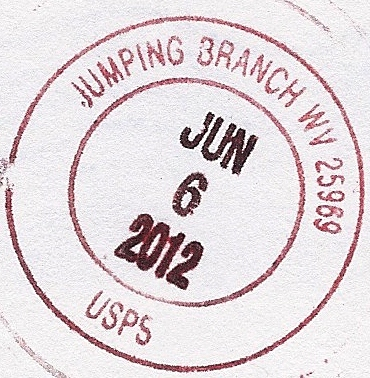
Jumping Branch postmark
