= Lanark, West Virginia =

- Unincorporated community
- Location within West Virginia Location within the United States
- Coordinates: 37°49′39″N 81°08′46″W
- Country: United States
- State: West Virginia
- County: Raleigh
- Elevation: 2,316 ft (706 m)
- Time zone: UTC-5 (Eastern (EST))
  - Summer (DST): UTC-4 (EDT)
- ZIP code: 25860
- Area codes: 304 & 681
- GNIS feature ID: 1554905

Lanark is an unincorporated community in Raleigh County, West Virginia, United States. Lanark is located on West Virginia Route 41, 4 miles (6.4 km) northeast of downtown Beckley. Lanark has a post office with ZIP code 25860.

The community was named after Lanark, in Scotland.
