= Lowell, West Virginia =

- Unincorporated community
- Location within West Virginia Location within the United States
- Coordinates: 37°39′16″N 80°43′44″W
- Country: United States
- State: West Virginia
- County: Summers
- Elevation: 1,519 ft (463 m)
- Time zone: UTC-5 (Eastern (EST))
  - Summer (DST): UTC-4 (EDT)
- Area codes: 304 & 681
- GNIS feature ID: 1555005

Lowell is an unincorporated community in Summers County, West Virginia, United States. Lowell is located on the Greenbrier River, east of Hinton and southwest of Alderson. The community was first settled in 1770 and is the oldest community in Summers County.

== Geography ==
Lowell is located at 37°39′16″N 80°43′44″W. It is situated in the Ridge-and-Valley Appalachians at an elevation of 1,519 feet (463 m). Lowell is located on the Greenbrier River, which runs north-south through the community; other streams in the area include Kelly Creek and Wind Creek, both tributaries of the Greenbrier.

The nearest post office to Lowell is in Talcott, which is 1.9 miles (3.1 km) west of Lowell and has ZIP code 24981. The nearest incorporated town to Lowell is Alderson, located 10.9 miles (17.5 km) to the northeast in Greenbrier and Monroe counties. Lowell is 12.5 miles (20.1 km) west of Hinton, the county seat of Summers County.

== History ==
Lowell was first settled in 1770 by Colonel James Graham; it was the first settlement in what is now Summers County. Samuel and James Gwinn, longtime neighbors of Mr. Graham, soon settled in Lowell as well. The Keller family, another prominent family in early Summers County, also settled in Lowell soon after the Grahams and Gwinns. In 1777, Lowell was attacked by Indians, who killed three members of Mr. Graham's household and kidnapped his daughter, whom Graham did not recover for eight years.

In 1871 or 1872, the brothers A.C. Lowe and Erastus Preston Lowe settled in Lowell, built a hotel, and entered business in the community. The settlement, which was unnamed prior to then, was ultimately named Lowell after the Lowe family. Lowell was an important point of commerce during this period, as it was the shipping point for the Red Sulphur Springs until 1904. Lowell once had a post office, which had been established by 1908 and is now closed.

=== Historic sites ===
Lowell contains two sites listed on the National Register of Historic Places, the Col. James Graham House and the Samuel Gwinn Plantation. The Col. James Graham House was built by Graham upon his settlement in Lowell in 1770. It is a log cabin and was considered one of the finest houses in the area upon its construction. The Samuel Gwinn Plantation was established in 1770 as the home of the Gwinn family. It consists of a manor house built in 1868 and eight other buildings, which together encompass 4 acres (16,000 m^{2}).

== Transportation ==
The main roads through Lowell are the concurrent West Virginia Route 3 and West Virginia Route 12 on the west side of the Greenbrier River and Summers County Route 15 on the east side. Other county roads in the community include Route 3/42, Route 3/44, Route 3/46, Route 15/1, and Route 15/2. Route 3/42 is a bridge over the Greenbrier River and connects the eastern and western parts of Lowell. The nearest Interstate Highway to Lowell is Interstate 64, which has an exit in Sandstone to the northwest of Lowell.

A CSX line runs through Lowell, crossing the Greenbrier River on a bridge in the community. This line also carries Amtrak's Cardinal service; its nearest stations to Lowell are in Alderson and Hinton.
