= Pipestem, West Virginia =

Pipestem
- Unincorporated community
- Location within the state of West Virginia Pipestem (the United States)
- Coordinates: 37°32′40″N 80°57′36″W
- Country: United States
- State: West Virginia
- County: Summers
- Time zone: UTC-5 (Eastern (EST))
  - Summer (DST): UTC-4 (EDT)
- ZIP codes: 25979

Pipestem (also Jordans Chapel or Pipe Stem) is an unincorporated community in Summers County, West Virginia, United States. It lies along West Virginia Route 20 to the south-southwest of the city of Hinton, the county seat of Summers County. Its elevation is 2,382 feet (726 m). It has a post office with the ZIP code 25979. It has a population of 764 people.
