= Raleigh County, West Virginia =

County in West Virginia, United States

- County
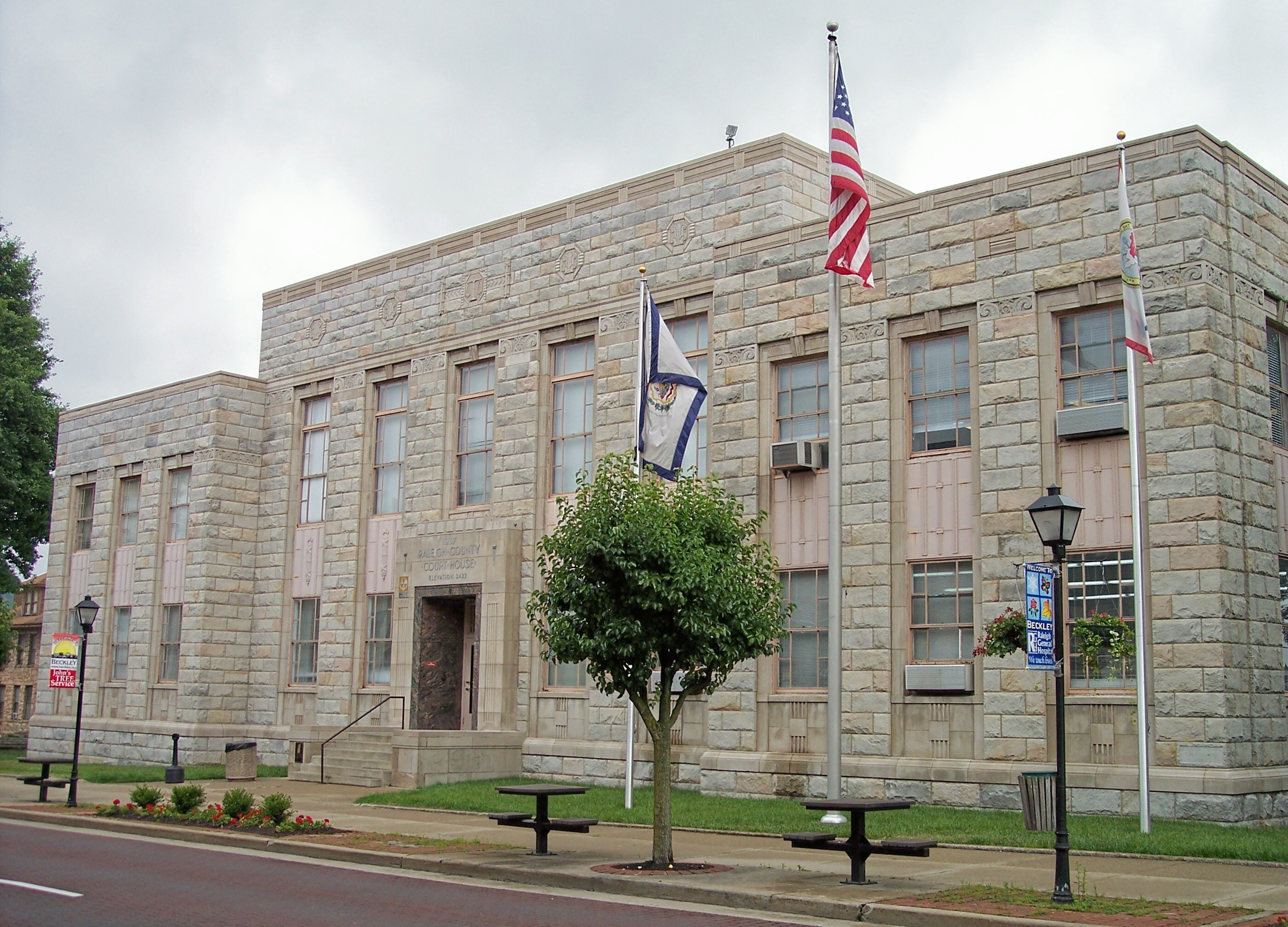
- The Raleigh County Courthouse in Beckley

- Seal

- Location within the U.S. state of West Virginia
- Coordinates: 37°47′N 81°16′W
- Country: United States
- State: West Virginia
- Founded: January 23, 1850
- Named for: Sir Walter Raleigh
- Seat: Beckley
- Largest city: Beckley

Area
  - Total: 609 sq mi (1,580 km^{2})
  - Land: 605 sq mi (1,570 km^{2})
  - Water: 4.0 sq mi (10 km^{2}) 0.7%

Population (2020)
  - Total: 74,591
  - Estimate (2025): 71,775 ▼
  - Density: 123/sq mi (47.6/km^{2})
- Time zone: UTC−5 (Eastern)
  - Summer (DST): UTC−4 (EDT)
- Congressional district: 1st
- Website: raleighcounty.gov

Raleigh County is a county in the U.S. state of West Virginia. As of the 2020 census, the population was 74,591. Its county seat is Beckley. The county was founded in 1850 and is named for Sir Walter Raleigh. Raleigh County is included in the Beckley, West Virginia, Metropolitan Statistical Area.

== History ==
Raleigh County and the surrounding area have long been home to many indigenous peoples. Early encounters describe the land as being the ancestral home of the Catawba-speaking Moneton people, who referred to the surrounding area as "okahok amai", and were allies of the Monacan people. The Moneton's Catawba speaking neighbors to the south, the Tutelo, (a tribe since absorbed into the Cayuga Nation) may have absorbed surviving Moneton communities, and claim the area as ancestral lands. Conflicts with European settlers resulted in various displaced Indian tribes settling in West Virginia, where they were known at Mingo, meaning "remote affiliates of the Iroquois Confederacy".

Raleigh County was formed on January 23, 1850, from portions of Fayette County, then a part of Virginia. Alfred Beckley (1802–88) said that he named the county for Sir Walter Raleigh (1552–1618), the "enterprising and far-seeing patron of the earliest attempts to colonize our old Mother State of Virginia".

Raleigh was one of fifty Virginia Counties that were admitted to the Union as the state of West Virginia on June 20, 1863. Later that year, the counties were divided into civil townships, with the intention of encouraging local government. This proved impractical in the heavily rural state, and in 1872 the townships were converted into magisterial districts. Raleigh County was initially divided into six townships: Clear Fork, Marsh Fork, Richman, Shady Spring, Town, and Trap Hill. These became magisterial districts in 1872, and the same year a seventh district, Slab Fork, was created from land that had previously belonged to Wyoming County. These remained largely unchanged over the next century, but in the 1970s the seven historic magisterial districts were consolidated into three new districts: District 1, District 2, and District 3.

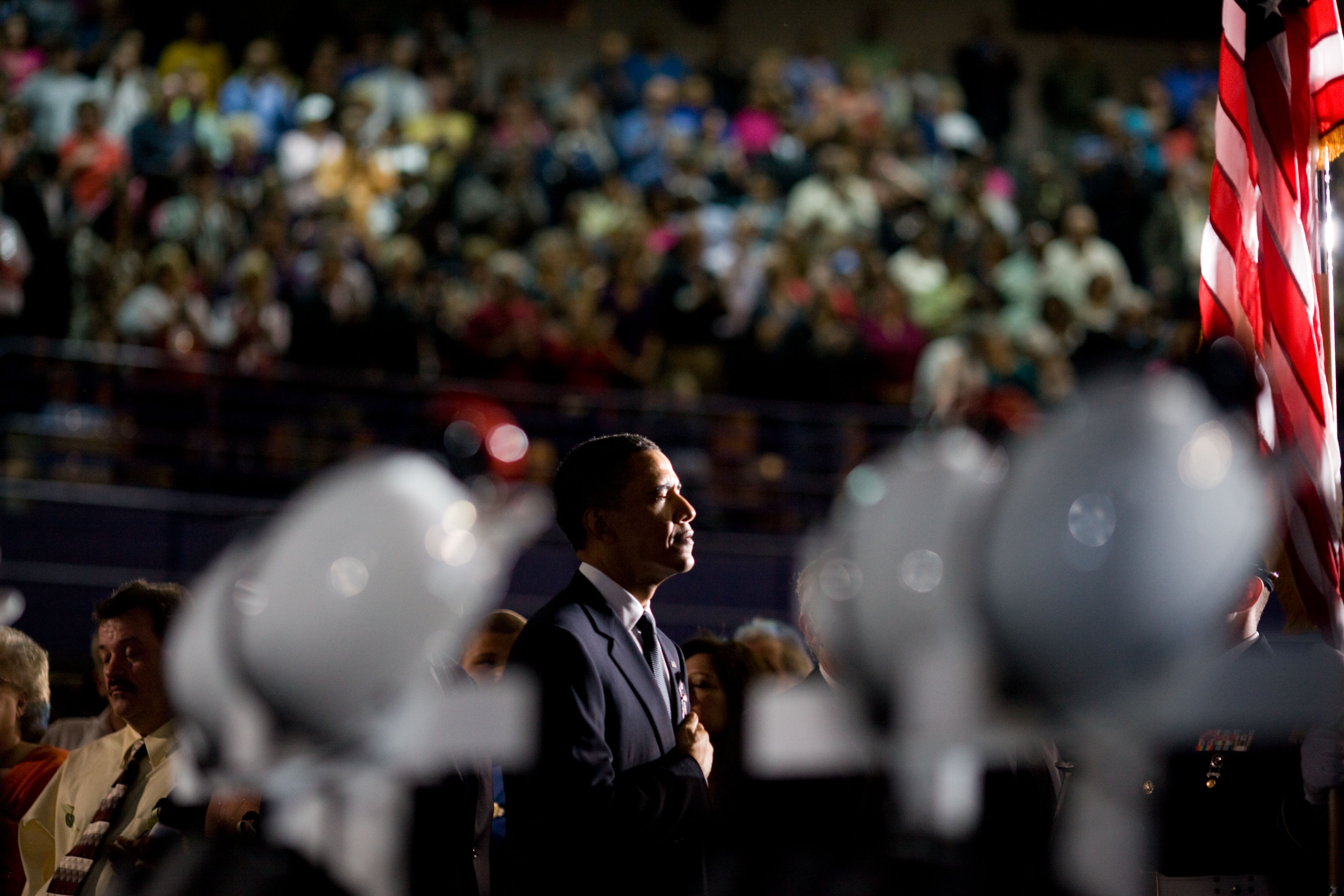
President Barack Obama stands for prayer on April 25, 2010, at the Beckley-Raleigh County Convention Center while attending a memorial service for the 29 miners who were killed in the Upper Big Branch Mine disaster

Heavily involved in the coal mining industry, Raleigh County has been the scene of numerous deadly incidents, of which the most severe was the Eccles Mine Disaster in 1914. At least one hundred and eighty miners died in what was the second-worst coal mining disaster in state history. More recently, the 2010 Upper Big Branch Mine disaster, which killed twenty-nine miners, occurred in Raleigh County. Raleigh County miners were also killed by violent suppression of labor organizing, such as in the so-called Battle of Stanaford during the 1902-1903 New River coal strike in which an armed posse led by a US Marshall who shot up miners' houses while they and their families slept, killing at least six. The perpetrators were later acquitted. The lead-up and aftermath were witnessed and widely recounted by Mother Jones, and the massacre is considered a prelude to the West Virginia coal wars.

The town of Sophia in Raleigh County was the home of Senator Robert C. Byrd.

== Geography ==
The New River flows northwestward along the county's east border. The county terrain consists of wooded hills, carved with drainages. The terrain slopes to the north and west; its highest point is near its southmost corner, at 3,524 ft (1,074 m) ASL. The county has a total area of 609 square miles (1,580 km^{2}), of which 605 square miles (1,570 km^{2}) is land and 4.0 square miles (10 km^{2}) (0.7%) is water.

=== Major highways ===
- Interstate 64
- Interstate 77
- U.S. Highway 19
- West Virginia Route 3
- West Virginia Route 16
- West Virginia Route 41
- West Virginia Route 54
- West Virginia Route 61
- West Virginia Route 97
- West Virginia Route 99
- West Virginia Route 210
- West Virginia Route 307
- West Virginia Route 121
- West Virginia Route 20

=== Adjacent counties ===
- Kanawha County (north)
- Fayette County (northeast)
- Summers County (east)
- Mercer County (southeast)
- Wyoming County (southwest)
- Boone County (northwest)

=== Protected areas ===
- Little Beaver State Park
- New River Gorge National Park and Preserve (part)

=== Lakes ===
- Flat Top Lake
- Glade Creek Reservoir
- Little Beaver Lake
- Stephens Lake

== Demographics ==
Historical population
| Census | Pop. | Note | %± |
|---|---|---|---|
| 1850 | 1,765 | | — |
| 1860 | 3,367 | | 90.8% |
| 1870 | 3,673 | | 9.1% |
| 1880 | 7,367 | | 100.6% |
| 1890 | 9,597 | | 30.3% |
| 1900 | 12,436 | | 29.6% |
| 1910 | 25,633 | | 106.1% |
| 1920 | 42,482 | | 65.7% |
| 1930 | 68,072 | | 60.2% |
| 1940 | 86,687 | | 27.3% |
| 1950 | 96,273 | | 11.1% |
| 1960 | 77,826 | | −19.2% |
| 1970 | 70,080 | | −10.0% |
| 1980 | 86,821 | | 23.9% |
| 1990 | 76,819 | | −11.5% |
| 2000 | 79,220 | | 3.1% |
| 2010 | 78,859 | | −0.5% |
| 2020 | 74,591 | | −5.4% |
| 2025 (est.) | 71,775 | ▼ | −3.8% |
US Decennial Census; 1790–1960 1900–1990; 1990–2000 2010–2020

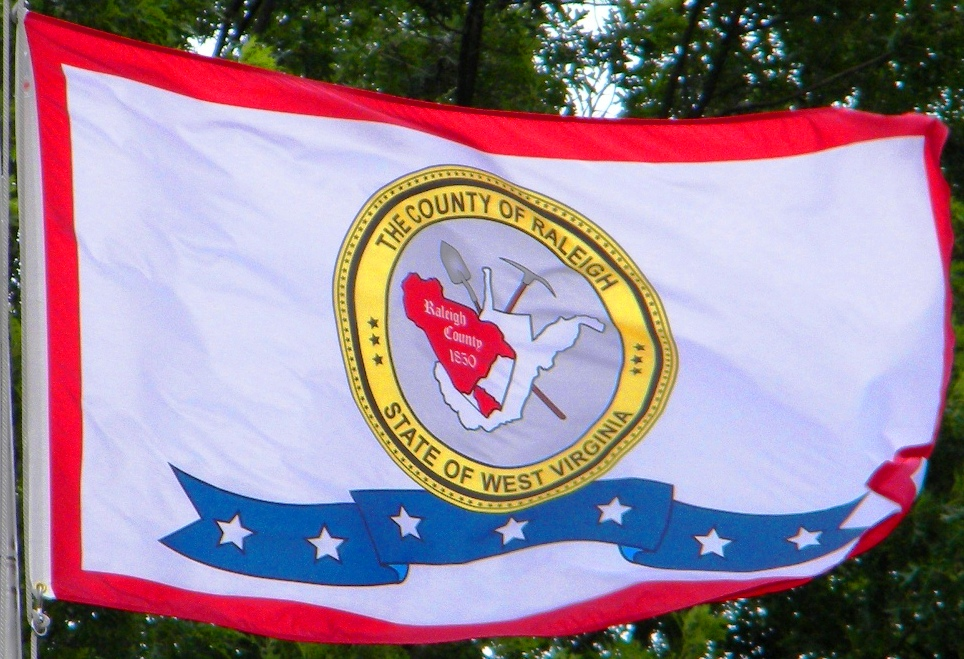
The Flag Of Raleigh County in Beckley

=== 2020 census ===
As of the 2020 census, the county had a population of 74,591. Of the residents, 20.8% were under the age of 18 and 21.2% were 65 years of age or older; the median age was 42.9 years. For every 100 females there were 100.6 males, and for every 100 females age 18 and over there were 99.5 males.

The racial makeup of the county was 85.8% White, 7.8% Black or African American, 0.2% American Indian and Alaska Native, 1.1% Asian, 0.5% from some other race, and 4.5% from two or more races. Hispanic or Latino residents of any race comprised 1.6% of the population.

There were 30,326 households in the county, of which 27.8% had children under the age of 18 living with them and 29.0% had a female householder with no spouse or partner present. About 30.2% of all households were made up of individuals and 14.5% had someone living alone who was 65 years of age or older.

There were 34,581 housing units, of which 12.3% were vacant. Among occupied housing units, 73.0% were owner-occupied and 27.0% were renter-occupied. The homeowner vacancy rate was 2.1% and the rental vacancy rate was 10.2%.

Raleigh County, West Virginia – Racial and ethnic composition Note: the US Census treats Hispanic/Latino as an ethnic category. This table excludes Latinos from the racial categories and assigns them to a separate category. Hispanics/Latinos may be of any race.
| Race / Ethnicity (NH = Non-Hispanic) | Pop 2000 | Pop 2010 | Pop 2020 | % 2000 | % 2010 | % 2020 |
|---|---|---|---|---|---|---|
| White alone (NH) | 70,421 | 69,246 | 63,510 | 88.89% | 87.81% | 85.14% |
| Black or African American alone (NH) | 6,719 | 6,390 | 5,790 | 8.48% | 8.10% | 7.76% |
| Native American or Alaska Native alone (NH) | 141 | 180 | 132 | 0.18% | 0.23% | 0.18% |
| Asian alone (NH) | 563 | 715 | 819 | 0.71% | 0.91% | 1.10% |
| Pacific Islander alone (NH) | 11 | 23 | 16 | 0.01% | 0.03% | 0.02% |
| Other race alone (NH) | 30 | 61 | 156 | 0.04% | 0.08% | 0.21% |
| Mixed race or Multiracial (NH) | 608 | 1,248 | 2,971 | 0.77% | 1.58% | 3.98% |
| Hispanic or Latino (any race) | 727 | 996 | 1,197 | 0.92% | 1.26% | 1.60% |
| Total | 79,220 | 78,859 | 74,591 | 100.00% | 100.00% | 100.00% |

=== 2010 census ===
As of the census of 2010, there were 78,859 people, 31,831 households, and 21,322 families in the county. The population density was 130 people per square mile (50 people/km^{2}). There were 35,931 housing units at an average density of 59.4 units per square mile (22.9 units/km^{2}). The racial makeup of the county was 88.5% white, 8.2% black or African American, 0.9% Asian, 0.2% American Indian, 0.4% from other races, and 1.7% from two or more races. Those of Hispanic or Latino origin made up 1.3% of the population. In terms of ancestry, 41.8% were American, 9.1% were English, 8.6% were German, and 8.5% were Irish.

Of the 31,831 households, 29.0% had children under the age of 18 living with them, 50.2% were married couples living together, 12.2% had a female householder with no husband present, 33.0% were non-families, and 28.6% of all households were made up of individuals. The average household size was 2.36 and the average family size was 2.87. The median age was 41.1 years.

The median income for a household in the county was $38,036 and the median income for a family was $49,837. Males had a median income of $42,405 versus $27,347 for females. The per capita income for the county was $20,457. About 14.5% of families and 17.5% of the population were below the poverty line, including 26.1% of those under age 18 and 10.2% of those age 65 or over.

=== 2000 census ===
As of the census of 2000, there were 79,220 people, 31,793 households, and 22,096 families in the county. The population density was 131 people per square mile (51 people/km^{2}). There were 35,678 housing units at an average density of 59 units per square mile (23 units/km^{2}). The racial makeup of the county was 89.63% White, 8.52% Black or African American, 0.19% Native American, 0.72% Asian, 0.02% Pacific Islander, 0.12% from other races, and 0.80% from two or more races. 0.92% of the population were Hispanic or Latino of any race.

There were 31,793 households, out of which 28.60% had children under the age of 18 living with them, 54.30% were married couples living together, 11.90% had a female householder with no husband present, and 30.50% were non-families. 27.10% of all households were made up of individuals, and 12.90% had someone living alone who was 65 years of age or older. The average household size was 2.38 and the average family size was 2.88.

The county population contained 21.50% under the age of 18, 8.70% from 18 to 24, 28.60% from 25 to 44, 25.70% from 45 to 64, and 15.40% who were 65 years of age or older. The median age was 40 years. For every 100 females there were 96.80 males. For every 100 females age 18 and over, there were 94.90 males.

The median income for a household in the county was $28,181, and the median income for a family was $35,315. Males had a median income of $33,000 versus $20,672 for females. The per capita income for the county was $16,233. About 14.60% of families and 18.50% of the population were below the poverty line, including 28.70% of those under age 18 and 10.50% of those age 65 or over.

== Politics ==
Raleigh County voters have tended to vote Republican in recent decades. In 67% of national elections since 1980, the county selected the Republican Party candidate (as of 2024).

United States presidential election results for Raleigh County, West Virginia
| Year | Republican | | Democratic | | Third party(ies) | |
| Year | No. | % | No. | % | No. | % |
|---|---|---|---|---|---|---|
| 1912 | 897 | 13.74% | 2,343 | 35.89% | 3,288 | 50.37% |
| 1916 | 3,791 | 52.21% | 3,319 | 45.71% | 151 | 2.08% |
| 1920 | 7,668 | 56.19% | 5,916 | 43.35% | 62 | 0.45% |
| 1924 | 8,643 | 49.43% | 7,776 | 44.47% | 1,067 | 6.10% |
| 1928 | 11,581 | 52.77% | 10,366 | 47.23% | 0 | 0.00% |
| 1932 | 11,441 | 42.25% | 15,456 | 57.08% | 181 | 0.67% |
| 1936 | 9,001 | 28.23% | 22,840 | 71.63% | 44 | 0.14% |
| 1940 | 11,752 | 33.71% | 23,105 | 66.29% | 0 | 0.00% |
| 1944 | 10,323 | 36.46% | 17,988 | 63.54% | 0 | 0.00% |
| 1948 | 10,414 | 34.42% | 19,697 | 65.09% | 148 | 0.49% |
| 1952 | 14,005 | 38.15% | 22,704 | 61.85% | 0 | 0.00% |
| 1956 | 16,318 | 50.08% | 16,264 | 49.92% | 0 | 0.00% |
| 1960 | 12,088 | 37.15% | 20,448 | 62.85% | 0 | 0.00% |
| 1964 | 6,952 | 22.75% | 23,606 | 77.25% | 0 | 0.00% |
| 1968 | 8,775 | 29.74% | 17,744 | 60.14% | 2,987 | 10.12% |
| 1972 | 19,150 | 64.40% | 10,586 | 35.60% | 0 | 0.00% |
| 1976 | 10,637 | 34.98% | 19,768 | 65.02% | 0 | 0.00% |
| 1980 | 10,713 | 37.16% | 16,955 | 58.81% | 1,163 | 4.03% |
| 1984 | 14,571 | 50.03% | 14,442 | 49.59% | 109 | 0.37% |
| 1988 | 10,395 | 41.95% | 14,302 | 57.71% | 85 | 0.34% |
| 1992 | 8,700 | 34.50% | 13,171 | 52.24% | 3,343 | 13.26% |
| 1996 | 8,628 | 36.53% | 12,547 | 53.12% | 2,447 | 10.36% |
| 2000 | 12,587 | 52.31% | 11,047 | 45.91% | 427 | 1.77% |
| 2004 | 18,519 | 60.67% | 11,815 | 38.71% | 191 | 0.63% |
| 2008 | 17,548 | 62.10% | 10,237 | 36.23% | 474 | 1.68% |
| 2012 | 20,614 | 71.48% | 7,739 | 26.84% | 484 | 1.68% |
| 2016 | 22,048 | 73.76% | 6,443 | 21.55% | 1,401 | 4.69% |
| 2020 | 24,673 | 74.51% | 7,982 | 24.10% | 459 | 1.39% |
| 2024 | 23,644 | 76.35% | 6,816 | 22.01% | 506 | 1.63% |

== Communities ==
=== City ===
- Beckley (county seat)

=== Towns ===
- Lester
- Mabscott
- Sophia

=== Magisterial districts ===
==== Current ====
- District 1
- District 2
- District 3

==== Historic ====
- Clear Fork
- Marsh Fork
- Richmond
- Shady Spring
- Slab Fork
- Town
- Trap Hill

=== Census-designated places ===
- Beaver
- Bolt
- Bradley
- Coal City
- Colcord
- Crab Orchard
- Daniels
- Dorothy
- Eccles
- Ghent
- Glen White
- Helen
- MacArthur
- Piney View
- Prosperity
- Shady Spring
- Stanaford

=== Unincorporated communities ===
- Abney
- Abraham
- Affinity
- Amigo
- Arnett
- Artie
- Beaver
- Besoco
- Big Stick
- Blue Jay
- Cedar
- Cool Ridge
- Crow
- Eastgulf
- Egeria
- Fireco
- Flat Top
- Glen Daniel
- Glen Morgan
- Grandview
- Hollywood
- Hot Coal
- Hotchkiss
- Jonben
- Josephine
- Killarney
- Lego
- Lillybrook
- McAlpin
- McVey
- Montcoal
- Naoma
- New
- Odd
- Pemberton
- Pickshin
- Pinepoca
- Pluto
- Price Hill
- Princewick
- Raleigh
- Redbird
- Rhodell
- Shiloh
- Slab Fork
- Soak Creek
- Stotesbury
- Sullivan
- Sylvia
- Tams
- Ury
- Whitby
- White Oak
- Willibet
- Winding Gulf
- Woodpeck

== See also ==
- Raleigh County Schools
- Coal camps in Raleigh County, West Virginia
- National Register of Historic Places listings in Raleigh County, West Virginia
- New River Coalfield
- Little Beaver State Park
- Upper Big Branch mine explosion
- Winding Gulf Coalfield
