= Coal camps in Fayette County, West Virginia =

The coal towns, or "coal camps" of Fayette County, West Virginia were situated to exploit the area's rich coal seams. Many of these towns were located in deep ravines that afforded direct access to the coal through the hillsides, allowing mined coal to be dropped or conveyed downhill to railway lines at the valley floor. Many of these encampments were set up as company towns, and when their mines closed, the towns vanished. A few, like Thurmond, West Virginia, have survived in a reduced state. Fayette County covers portions of three coalfields: the New River Coalfield, the Kanawha Coalfield and the Greenbrier Coalfield. Below is a partial list of known coal towns within the three coalfields: the New River Coalfield, the Kanawha Coalfield and the Greenbrier Coalfield. More may be found here

== New River Coalfield ==
- Ames
- Bachman (abandoned)
- Beury (abandoned)
- Brooklyn
- Brown (abandoned)
- Caperton (abandoned)
- Carlisle
- Claremont (abandoned)
- Clifftop (abandoned)
- Concho (abandoned)
- Cunard
- Dimmock (abandoned)
- Elmo (abandoned, later named Ames)
- Elverton (abandoned)
- Fayette (abandoned)
- Fire Creek (abandoned)
- Glen Jean
- Harvey
- Kay Moor (abandoned)
- Kilsyth
- Layland
- Lawton (abandoned)
- Lochgelly
- MacDonald
- Minden
- Mount Hope
- Newlyn (abandoned)
- Nuttalburg (abandoned)
- Prudence
- Red Ash (abandoned)
- Red Star
- Rush Run (abandoned)
- Scarbro
- Sewell (abandoned)
- Stone Cliff (abandoned)
- Sugar Creek (abandoned)
- Summerlee
- Sun (abandoned)
- Sunnyside (abandoned)
- Thayer
- Thurmond
- Turkey Knob
- Whipple
- Wingrove

== Kanawha Coalfield ==
- Beards Fork
- Cannelton
- Carbondale
- Collinsdale
- Eagle (abandoned)
- Elkridge
- Gamoca (abandoned)
- Harewood (abandoned)
- Ingram Branch (abandoned)
- Jodie
- Kimberly
- Kingston (abandoned)
- Longacre (abandoned)
- Long Branch (abandoned)
- McDunn (abandoned)
- Marting (abandoned)
- Milburn (abandoned)
- Page
- Pax
- Powellton
- Vanetta (abandoned)
- Willis Branch
- Wyndal (abandoned)

== Greenbrier Coalfield ==
- Beelick Knob
- Bellwood
