= List of ghost towns in West Virginia =

There are many ghost towns in West Virginia, some of which were created and abandoned as part of the "boom and bust" economy of coal mining industry.

- Algoma, in McDowell County
- Ames, in Fayette County
- Bachman, in Fayette County
- Bartley, in McDowell County
- Beartown, in McDowell County
- Beury, in Fayette County
- Big Sandy, in McDowell County
- Black Wolf, in McDowell County
- Blue Sulphur Springs, in Greenbrier County
- Boone, in Fayette County
- Brink, in Greenbrier County
- Brooklyn, in Fayette County
- Brown, in Fayette County
- Bulltown, in Braxton County
- Caperton, in Fayette County
- Carbondale, in Fayette County
- Carlisle, in Fayette County
- Carver, in Fayette County
- Cinderella, in Mingo County
- Concho, in Fayette County
- Crescent, in Fayette County
- Cunard, in Fayette County
- Derryhale, in Fayette County
- Devon, in Mingo County
- Dimmock, in Fayette County
- Dunloup, in Fayette County
- Eagle, in Fayette County
- Elverton, in Fayette County
- Emmett, in Logan County
- Ennis, in McDowell County
- Erskine, in Fayette County
- Faraday, in McDowell County
- Fayette, in Fayette County
- Fire Creek, in Fayette County
- Freed, in Calhoun County
- Gad, in Nicholas County. Submerged under Summersville Lake
- Gamoca, in Fayette County
- Gaymont, in Fayette County
- Gilliam, in McDowell County
- Glade, in Fayette County
- Glen Alum, in Mingo County
- Goodwill, in Mercer County
- Harewood, in Fayette County
- Hawks Nest, in Fayette County
- Honeydew, in Fayette County
- Ingram Branch, in Fayette County
- Jacobs Fork, in McDowell County
- Jerryville, in Webster County
- Kaymoor, in Fayette County
- Kilsyth, in Fayette County
- Kingston, in Fayette County
- Krollitz, in McDowell County
- Landgraff, in McDowell County
- Landisburg, in Fayette County
- Layland, in Fayette County
- Lex, in McDowell County
- Lilly, in Summers County
- Lobelia, in Pocahontas County
- Long Branch, in Fayette County
- Lookout, in Fayette County
- Lynn, in Mingo County
- Mahan, in Fayette County
- Marting, in Fayette County
- McDunn, in Fayette County
- Meadow Fork, in Fayette County
- Micajah, in Mercer County
- Michigan, in Fayette County
- Milburn, in Fayette County
- Mohawk, in McDowell County
- Mohegan, in McDowell County
- New Thacker, in Mingo County
- Newlyn, in Fayette County
- Nuttallburg, in Fayette County
- Old Gauley, in Fayette County
- Panther, in McDowell County
- Perlytown, in Randolph County
- Pennbrook, in Fayette County
- Putney, in Kanawha County
- Ream, in McDowell County
- Red Ash, in Fayette County
- Rend, in Fayette County
- Royal, in Raleigh County
- Rush Run, in Fayette County
- Rutherford, in Ritchie County
- Sewell, in Fayette County
- Stiltner in Wayne County. Submerged under East Lynn Lake.
- Stone House, in Taylor County
- Stotesbury, in Raleigh County
- Sun, in Fayette County
- Sunnyside, in Fayette County
- Superior, in McDowell County
- Thirty-One Camp
- Thurmond, in Fayette County
- Turkey Knob, in Fayette County
- Vanetta, in Fayette County
- Virginius Island, in Jefferson County
- Volcano, in Wood County
- War Eagle, in Mingo County
- Westerly, in Fayette County
- Whitney, in Fayette County
- Willis Branch, in Fayette County
- Wilmore, in McDowell County
- Winona, in Fayette County
- Wyndal, in Fayette County
- Wyoming, in Wyoming County
- Yerba, in McDowell County
