= Beury =

Beury may refer to:

- Beury Mountain Wildlife Management Area, West Virginia
- Beury, West Virginia
- National Bank of North Philadelphia in Philadelphia, Pennsylvania, also known at the Beury Building

== People with the surname ==
- Charles Ezra Beury (1879–1953), the second president of Temple University
