= Rush Run =

Rush Run may refer to:

- Rush Run, Ohio, an unincorporated community in Jefferson County
- Rush Run, West Virginia, an unincorporated community in Fayette County
- Rush Run (New River), a stream in West Virginia
