= Honeydew =

Honeydew may refer to:

- Honeydew (melon), a cultivar group of melon
- Honeydew (excretion), a sugar-rich sticky substance excreted by various animals
- Honeydew moth (Cryptoblabes gnidiella), a moth of Southern and Middle America
- Honeydew, California, United States, a town
- Honeydew, West Virginia, United States, an unincorporated community
- Honeydew (color), a pale shade of the color spring green
- Bunsen Honeydew, a fictional character from The Muppets franchise
- Honeydew (album), a 2008 album by Shawn Mullins
- Honeydew (film), a 2020 American horror film written and directed by Devereux Milburn
- Honey Dew Donuts, a Massachusetts-based franchise selling donuts and other breakfast foods
- Fuller's Organic Honey Dew, a brand of pale ale brewed by Fuller's Brewery
- Simon "Honeydew" Lane, a member of internet gaming group The Yogscast
- "Honeydew" (The Bear), a 2023 episode of The Bear TV series
