= Brink, Greenbrier County, West Virginia =

Brink, West Virginia
- Ghost town
- Location within West Virginia
- Coordinates: 37°50′42″N 80°20′46″W
- Country: United States
- State: West Virginia
- County: Greenbrier
- Elevation: 1,759 ft (536 m)
- GNIS feature ID

Brink is a ghost town in Greenbrier County, West Virginia, United States. Brink was located on the Greenbrier River 4 miles (6.4 km) northwest of White Sulphur Springs. Brink appeared on USGS maps as late as 1923.

The town was founded by Brinkley M. Snodgrass in 1865–66. An abandoned house and church near Loopemount are all that remain of the settlement.
