= Vanetta =

Vanetta may refer to:

- Matteo Vanetta (born 1978), Swiss football coach and player
- Vanetta, West Virginia, United States

== See also ==
- Vonetta Flowers (born 1973), American athlete
- Vonetta McGee (1945–2010), American actress
