= New Thacker, West Virginia =

New Thacker
- Unincorporated community
- Location within the state of West Virginia
- Coordinates: 37°34′15″N 82°5′22″W
- Country: United States
- State: West Virginia
- County: Mingo
- Elevation: 1,017 ft (310 m)
- Time zone: UTC-5 (Eastern (EST))
  - Summer (DST): UTC-4 (EDT)
- FIPS code: 1728822

New Thacker was an unincorporated community and coal town located in Mingo County, West Virginia, United States. Its post office has been closed.

The community most likely took its name from nearby Thacker Creek.

== See also ==
- List of ghost towns in West Virginia
