= Newlyn (disambiguation) =

Newlyn is a town near Penzance in Cornwall, England.

Newlyn may also refer to:

== Places ==
- Newlyn, a village near Newquay in Cornwall, England, now generally known as St Newlyn East
  - Newlyn Downs
- Newlyn, West Virginia
- Newlyn, Victoria, Australia

== People with the forename ==
- Saint Newlyn otherwise Noyale, a 5th-century Celtic saint

== People with the surname ==
- Lucy Newlyn (born 1956), British poet and academic
- Robert Newlyn (priest) (1597-1688), English clergyman and academic
- Robert Newlyn (MP) (fl. 1421), English politician

== Other uses ==
- HMS Newlyn, the intended name of a Hunt-class minesweeper, completed as HMS Newark in 1918
- Newlyn Copper, a class of arts and crafts copperware
- Newlyn School, a school of artists
