= Nell W. Walker =

American politician (1889–1962)

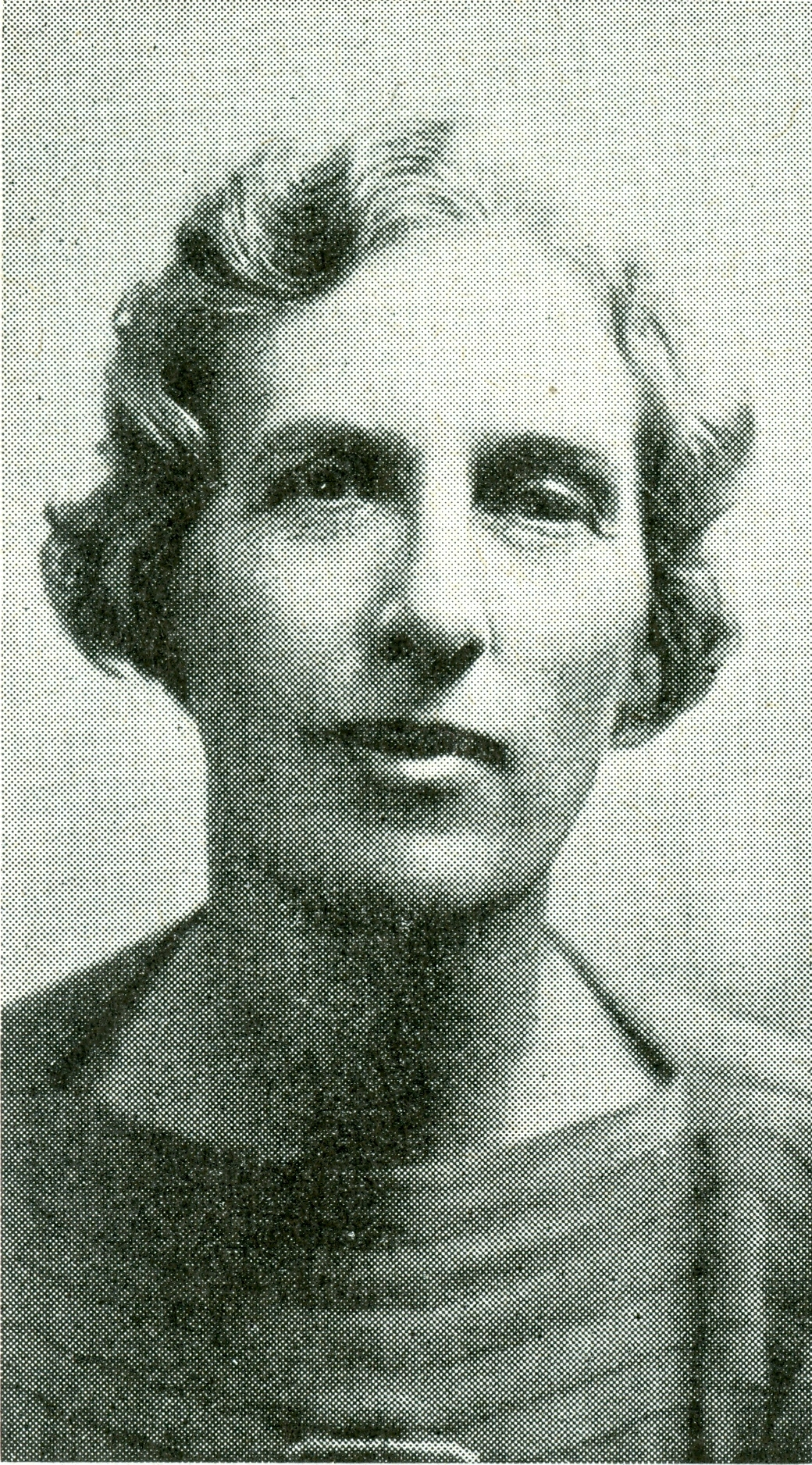
- Walker, circa 1951

Member of the West Virginia House of Delegates from Fayette County
- In office 1958 – March 5, 1962
- Preceded by: T. E. Myles Jr.
- Succeeded by: T. E. Myles Jr.

Banking Commissioner of West Virginia
- In office July 15, 1955 – July 1, 1957
- Preceded by: John H. Hoffman
- Succeeded by: Donald L. Taylor

Member of the West Virginia House of Delegates from Fayette County
- In office 1936 – July 15, 1955
- Preceded by: Allie Dickerson Proctor (Note: Allie Dickerson Proctor was appointed to serve the rest of her husband Charles Nelson Proctor's term following his death in June 1936. Walker was selected to take Charles Proctor's place on the ballot that November, and Allie Proctor did not run for re-election.)
- Succeeded by: T. E. Myles Jr.

Personal details
- Born: February 6, 1888 Fayette County, West Virginia, US
- Died: March 5, 1962 (aged 74) Baltimore, Maryland, US
- Party: Democratic

Nell W. Walker (February 6, 1888 – March 5, 1962), nicknamed "Pistol Nell" by her fellow legislators, was an American banker and politician from West Virginia. She served in the West Virginia House of Delegates from 1936 to 1955, and then from 1958 to her death in 1962, representing Fayette County as a Democrat. She also served as Banking Commissioner of West Virginia from 1955 to 1957, the first woman to hold the position.

== Early life ==
Walker was born on a farm near Sewell Mountain in Fayette County, West Virginia, on February 6, 1888. She served with the American Red Cross during World War I, spending 13 months in France as part of her duties.

== Political career ==
Walker was nominated for the West Virginia House of Delegates in June 1936. Following the death of incumbent Charles Nelson Proctor, the Fayette County Democratic Executive Committee nominated Walker, a member of the Democratic state executive committee, to take Proctor's place on the ballot. Walker won election that November, alongside fellow delegates R. L. Matthews and J. Alex Tinsley.

She continued to win re-election, serving in the state House until June 1955, when she was selected to be the state's banking commissioner by Governor William C. Marland following the resignation of John H. Hoffman. Upon being offered the role, Walker asked for time to consider it, but ultimately accepted and began serving on July 15, 1955, becoming the first woman to hold the position. Walker served as commissioner until July 1, 1957, when she stepped down. Donald L. Taylor was appointed as her replacement.

In 1958, she was elected again to the House. She won re-election in 1960, but stated in January 1962 she had "just about made up [her] mind" that she would not run in that year's elections.

== Banking career and "Pistol Nell" robbery ==
Outside of politics, Walker worked as vice president and assistant cashier at the Winona National Bank in Winona, West Virginia. She worked there for 37 years, until the bank's assets were sold off in 1959.

During her tenure, the bank was robbed three times, the third of which took place on March 29, 1951. At around 2 p.m., Walker pointed out to fellow employee and cashier Joseph R. Hisey that a man, later identified as James Burke of Beckley, had been standing in the bank for more than 30 minutes. Hisey asked the man to leave, but Burke simply waited by the door for the other customers to leave the bank. Once the bank was empty, Burke handed Hisey a note informing him the bank was being robbed and held him at gunpoint. Walker realized the bank was being robbed, and went into the back to grab a gun she began keeping after a previous robbery in November 1950. She walked out of the back room and passed the gun to Hisey. (Note: Sources differ on exactly how Walker passed the gun to Hisey. The Hinton Daily News reported that she set it on a counter, and Hisey grabbed it while pretending to comply with the robber's instructions. The Beckley Post-Herald reported that Hisey grabbed the gun from Walker as he walked by. In her 1962 obituary, the Post-Herald wrote that she slid it across the counter to Hinsey.) Burke noticed Hisey taking the weapon, and pulled the trigger of his own gun, but it failed to fire. Hisey then fired multiple shots at Burke, hitting him in his back and leg. Burke began to run away, but collapsed a short distance from the bank. For this, her fellow legislators in the House of Delegates gave her the nickname "Pistol Nell", although they did not use it around her out of respect.

== Death ==
Walker died on March 5, 1962, of a heart attack while visiting her brother in Baltimore, Maryland, at the age of 74.
