= Ennis, West Virginia =

Unincorporated community in West Virginia, United States

Ennis
- Unincorporated community
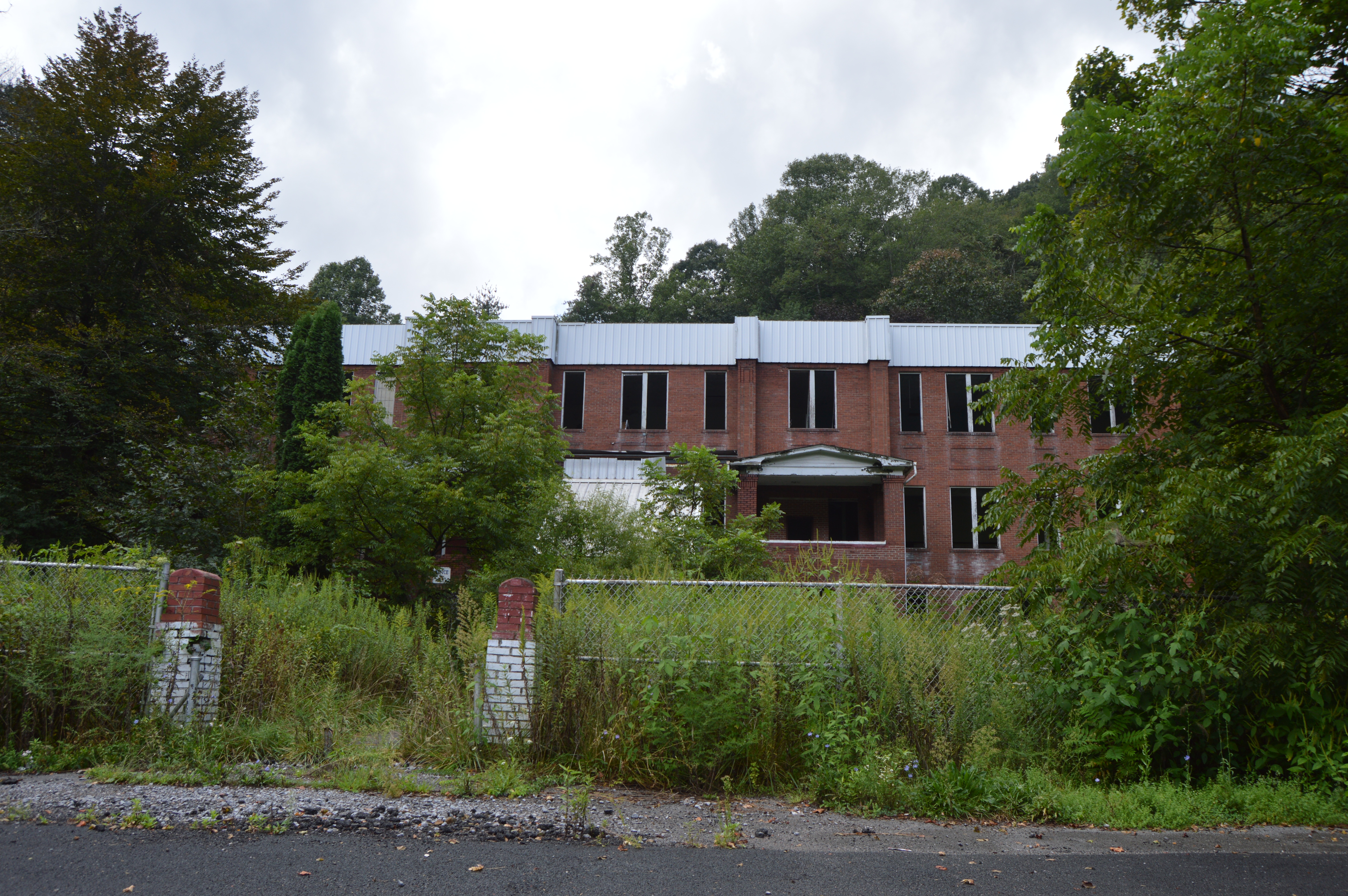
- Abandoned elementary school

- Location within the state of West Virginia Ennis (the United States)
- Coordinates: 37°22′33″N 81°23′34″W
- Country: United States
- State: West Virginia
- County: McDowell
- Time zone: UTC-5 (Eastern (EST))
  - Summer (DST): UTC-4 (EDT)
- GNIS feature ID: 1554404

Ennis is an unincorporated community in McDowell County, West Virginia, United States. Ennis lies on U.S. Route 52, west of Switchback.

The community most likely was named after a local resident, Joanna Ennis McQuail, wife of coal operator William McQuail.

== See also ==
- List of ghost towns in West Virginia
