= Nuttallburg, West Virginia =

- Unincorporated community
- Location within West Virginia Location within the United States
- Coordinates: 38°3′00″N 81°2′25″W
- Country: United States
- State: West Virginia
- County: Fayette
- Elevation: 994 ft (303 m)
- Time zone: UTC-5 (Eastern (EST))
  - Summer (DST): UTC-4 (EDT)
- GNIS ID: 1556160

Nuttallburg (also known as Brown) was an unincorporated community located in Fayette County, West Virginia, named by English pioneer John Nuttall who discovered coal in the area. Nuttallburg had a post office until 1955. It is no longer inhabited and is just outside Winona.

Nuttalburg is located on the New River and was developed to house workers mining coal sold to the Chesapeake and Ohio Railway. Henry Ford built a huge conveyor belt system to transport coal from the mine to the river and railroad below, but sold his interest in the mine in 1928. Production ceased in 1958.

The town is included within the Nuttallburg Coal Mining Complex and Town Historic District, part of New River Gorge National Park and Preserve.

== See also ==
- List of ghost towns in West Virginia
