= Goodwill, West Virginia =

Unincorporated community in West Virginia, United States

- Unincorporated community
- Location within the state of West Virginia Goodwill, West Virginia (the United States)
- Coordinates: 37°21′15″N 81°17′22″W
- Country: United States
- State: West Virginia
- County: Mercer
- Elevation: 2,280 ft (690 m)
- Time zone: UTC-5 (Eastern (EST))
  - Summer (DST): UTC-4 (EDT)
- Area codes: 304 & 681
- GNIS feature ID: 1554581

Goodwill is an unincorporated community in Mercer County, West Virginia, United States. Goodwill is 2 miles (3.2 km) west of Montcalm.

The community was named after one Mr. Goodwill, the proprietor of a local mine.

== See also ==
- List of ghost towns in West Virginia
