= Micajah, West Virginia =

- Unincorporated community
- Location within the state of West Virginia Micajah, West Virginia (the United States)
- Coordinates: 37°27′59″N 81°19′33″W
- Country: United States
- State: West Virginia
- County: Mercer
- Elevation: 2,333 ft (711 m)
- Time zone: UTC-5 (Eastern (EST))
  - Summer (DST): UTC-4 (EDT)
- Area codes: 304 & 681
- GNIS feature ID: 1555110

Micajah is an unincorporated community in Mercer County, West Virginia, United States. Micajah is 5.5 miles (8.9 km) northwest of Matoaka.

== See also ==
- List of ghost towns in West Virginia
