= Wyoming, West Virginia =

Community in West Virginia, US

Wyoming
- Unincorporated community
- Location within the state of West Virginia Wyoming (the United States)
- Coordinates: 37°34′56″N 81°36′9″W
- Country: United States
- State: West Virginia
- County: Wyoming
- Time zone: UTC-5 (Eastern (EST))
  - Summer (DST): UTC-4 (EDT)
- ZIP codes: 24898
- Area code: 304
- GNIS feature ID: 1556034

Wyoming is an unincorporated community in Wyoming County, West Virginia, United States. It gets its name from the counties name. Wyoming sits along the Guyandotte River. Wyoming has a post office and a Methodist church.

== Notable person ==
Wyoming is home to former NFL running back Curt Warner, who played for the Seattle Seahawks and the Los Angeles Rams.

== See also ==
- List of ghost towns in West Virginia
