= Lynn, West Virginia =

Lynn
- Unincorporated community
- Location within the state of West Virginia Lynn (the United States)
- Coordinates: 37°36′9″N 82°9′18″W
- Country: United States
- State: West Virginia
- County: Mingo
- Elevation: 781 ft (238 m)
- Time zone: UTC-5 (Eastern (EST))
  - Summer (DST): UTC-4 (EDT)
- GNIS ID: 1555014

Lynn is an unincorporated community in Mingo County, West Virginia, United States.

== See also ==
- List of ghost towns in West Virginia
