= Erskine, West Virginia =

Unincorporated community in West Virginia, United States

- Unincorporated community
- Location within West Virginia Location within the United States
- Coordinates: 37°58′00″N 81°4′51″W
- Country: United States
- State: West Virginia
- County: Fayette
- Elevation: 1,106 ft (337 m)
- Time zone: UTC-5 (Eastern (EST))
  - Summer (DST): UTC-4 (EDT)
- GNIS ID: 1556083

Erskine was an unincorporated community and coal town in Fayette County, West Virginia.

== See also ==
- List of ghost towns in West Virginia
