= Pennbrook, West Virginia =

- Unincorporated community
- Location within West Virginia Location within the United States
- Coordinates: 37°57′57″N 81°1′12″W
- Country: United States
- State: West Virginia
- County: Fayette
- Elevation: 1,030 ft (310 m)
- Time zone: UTC-5 (Eastern (EST))
  - Summer (DST): UTC-4 (EDT)
- GNIS ID: 1556173

Pennbrook was an unincorporated community and coal town in Fayette County, West Virginia.

== See also ==
- List of ghost towns in West Virginia
