= Devon, West Virginia =

Unincorporated community in West Virginia, United States

- Unincorporated community
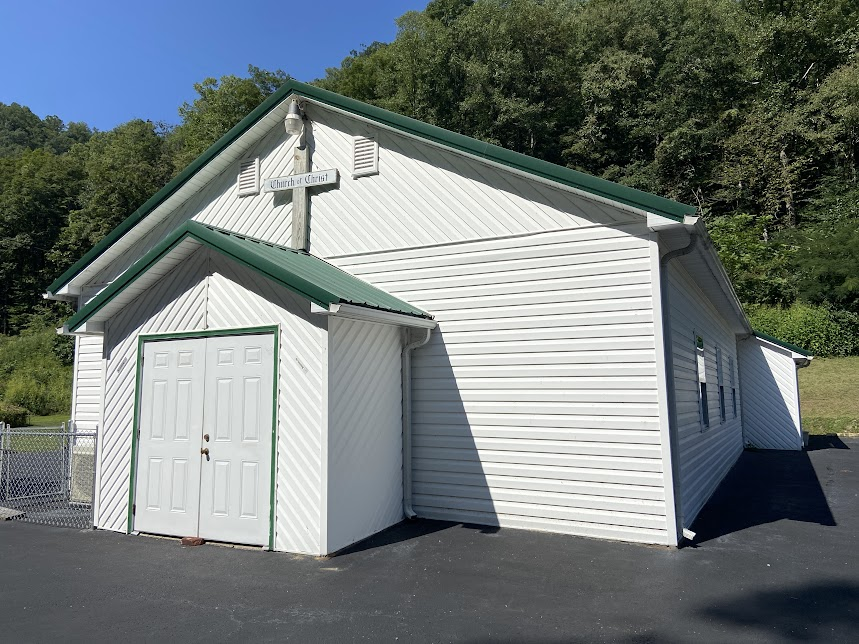
- Devon Church of Christ

- Location within West Virginia Location within the United States
- Coordinates: 37°32′14″N 82°03′45″W
- Country: United States
- State: West Virginia
- County: Mingo
- Elevation: 778 ft (237 m)
- Time zone: UTC-5 (Eastern (EST))
  - Summer (DST): UTC-4 (EDT)
- Area codes: 304 & 681
- GNIS feature ID: 1549654

Devon is an unincorporated community in Mingo County, West Virginia, United States.

== See also ==
- List of ghost towns in West Virginia
