= War Eagle, West Virginia =

War Eagle
- Unincorporated community
- Location within the state of West Virginia
- Coordinates: 37°31′42″N 81°56′38″W
- Country: United States
- State: West Virginia
- County: Mingo
- Elevation: 863 ft (263 m)
- Time zone: UTC-5 (Eastern (EST))
  - Summer (DST): UTC-4 (EDT)
- FIPS code: 1555917

War Eagle is an unincorporated community located in Mingo County, West Virginia, United States.

== History ==
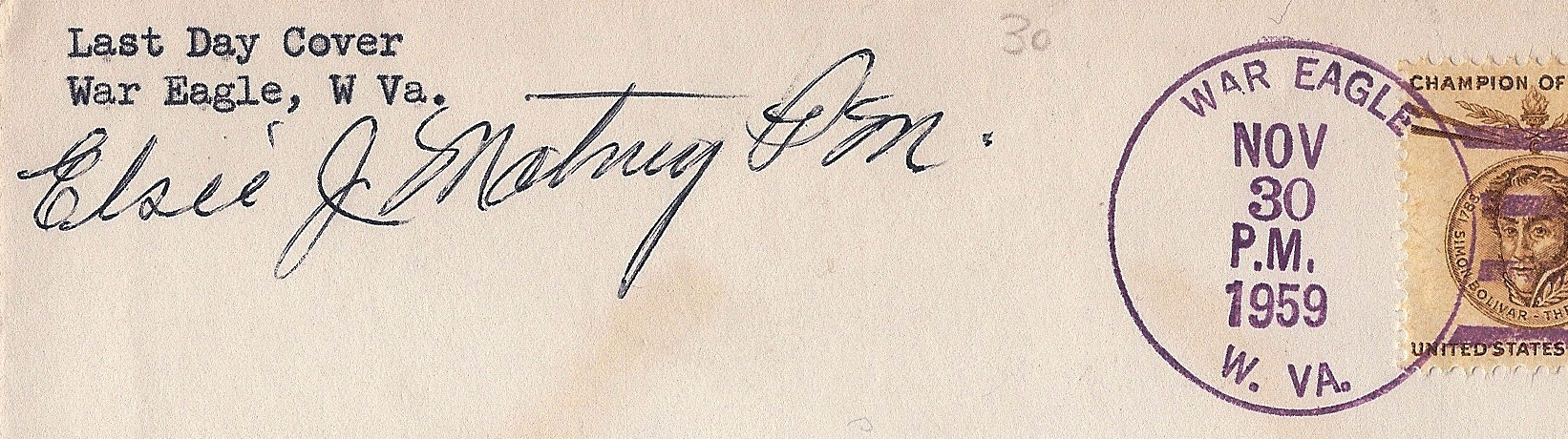
Cancellation from War Eagle

A post office called War Eagle was established in 1902, and remained in operation until it was discontinued in 1959. War Eagle took its name from a local mining company.

== See also ==
- List of ghost towns in West Virginia
