= Rutherford, West Virginia =

Rutherford
- Unincorporated community
- Location within the state of West Virginia Rutherford (the United States)
- Coordinates: 39°09′02″N 81°10′14″W
- Country: United States
- State: West Virginia
- County: Ritchie
- Elevation: 689 ft (210 m)
- Time zone: UTC-5 (Eastern (EST))
  - Summer (DST): UTC-4 (EDT)
- GNIS feature ID: 1549908

Rutherford is an unincorporated community within Ritchie County, West Virginia, United States. Its post office has been closed.

== See also ==
- List of ghost towns in West Virginia
