= Glade, West Virginia =

Unincorporated community in West Virginia, United States

- Unincorporated community
- Location within West Virginia Location within the United States
- Coordinates: 37°49′56″N 81°00′3″W
- Country: United States
- State: West Virginia
- County: Fayette
- Elevation: 1,243 ft (379 m)
- Time zone: UTC-5 (Eastern (EST))
  - Summer (DST): UTC-4 (EDT)
- GNIS ID: 1554559

Glade is an unincorporated community in Fayette County, West Virginia, United States. It was also known as Paw Paw.

The community takes its name from nearby Glade Creek.

== See also ==
- List of ghost towns in West Virginia
