= Meadow Fork, West Virginia =

- Unincorporated community
- Location within West Virginia Location within the United States
- Coordinates: 37°55′59″N 81°6′15″W
- Country: United States
- State: West Virginia
- County: Fayette
- Elevation: 1,348 ft (411 m)
- Time zone: UTC-5 (Eastern (EST))
  - Summer (DST): UTC-4 (EDT)
- GNIS ID: 1555094

Meadow Fork is an unincorporated community in Fayette County, West Virginia, United States.

Today, moss-covered railroad ties can still be seen at the former site of the Meadow Fork mine tipple.

== See also ==
- List of ghost towns in West Virginia
