= Cinderella, West Virginia =

Unincorporated community in West Virginia, United States

Cinderella
- Unincorporated community
- Location within the state of West Virginia Cinderella (the United States)
- Coordinates: 37°41′3″N 82°14′11″W
- Country: United States
- State: West Virginia
- County: Mingo
- Elevation: 837 ft (255 m)
- Time zone: UTC-5 (Eastern (EST))
  - Summer (DST): UTC-4 (EDT)
- GNIS ID: 1554137

Cinderella is an unincorporated community and coal town in Mingo County, West Virginia, United States.

== History ==
A post office called Cinderella was established in 1911, and remained in operation until it was discontinued in 1966. The community took the name of Cinderella, the character who appeared in the logo of a local mining company. Cinderella has been noted for its unusual place name.

Cinderella was a shipping point on the Norfolk and Western Railway for coal mined in Cinderella Mine.

== See also ==
- List of ghost towns in West Virginia
