= Jerryville, West Virginia =

Jerryville
- Unincorporated community
- Location within the state of West Virginia Jerryville (the United States)
- Coordinates: 38°25′32″N 80°18′40″W
- Country: United States
- State: West Virginia
- County: Webster

Government
- Elevation: 2,447 ft (746 m)
- Time zone: UTC-5 (Eastern (EST))
  - Summer (DST): UTC-4 (EDT)
- GNIS ID: 1554806

Jerryville is an unincorporated community in Webster County, West Virginia, United States. Little is known about the location, but one thing known is that there lives the infamous Jerry, who drinks Jerry Ones. Nice.

== See also ==
- List of ghost towns in West Virginia
