= Mann's Creek Railroad =

Overview
- Headquarters: Clifftop, West Virginia
- Locale: Fayette County, West Virginia
- Dates of operation: 1886–1955

Technical
- Track gauge: 3 ft (914 mm) (narrow gauge)
- Length: 9 miles (14 km)

The Mann's Creek Railroad was a 3 ft (914 mm) narrow gauge railroad that operated during the nineteenth- and twentieth-centuries in Fayette County, West Virginia, United States.

== History ==
The Mann's Creek Railroad was constructed in 1886 to haul coal and lumber for the Babcock Coal and Coke Company, which owned and operated the line. The line followed Mann's Creek, a tributary of the New River, from the Chesapeake and Ohio Railway's mainline at Sewell for approximately 9 miles (14 km) to the community of Clifftop.

Due to the area's rugged terrain, construction of the line required numerous retaining walls and demolition of numerous cliffs. A 35-foot (11 m) high, 224-foot (68 m) long timber trestle was constructed over Glade Creek on a sharp horseshoe curve where the line deviated from the Mann's Creek in order to gain elevation. At Clifftop were the Babcock Coal and Coke Company's coal mines, which the railroad served by hauling coal down to 193 beehive coke ovens along the C&O mainline at Sewell.
