= Nuttallburg Coal Mining Complex and Town Historic District =

Historic district in West Virginia, United States

- U.S. National Register of Historic Places
- U.S. Historic district
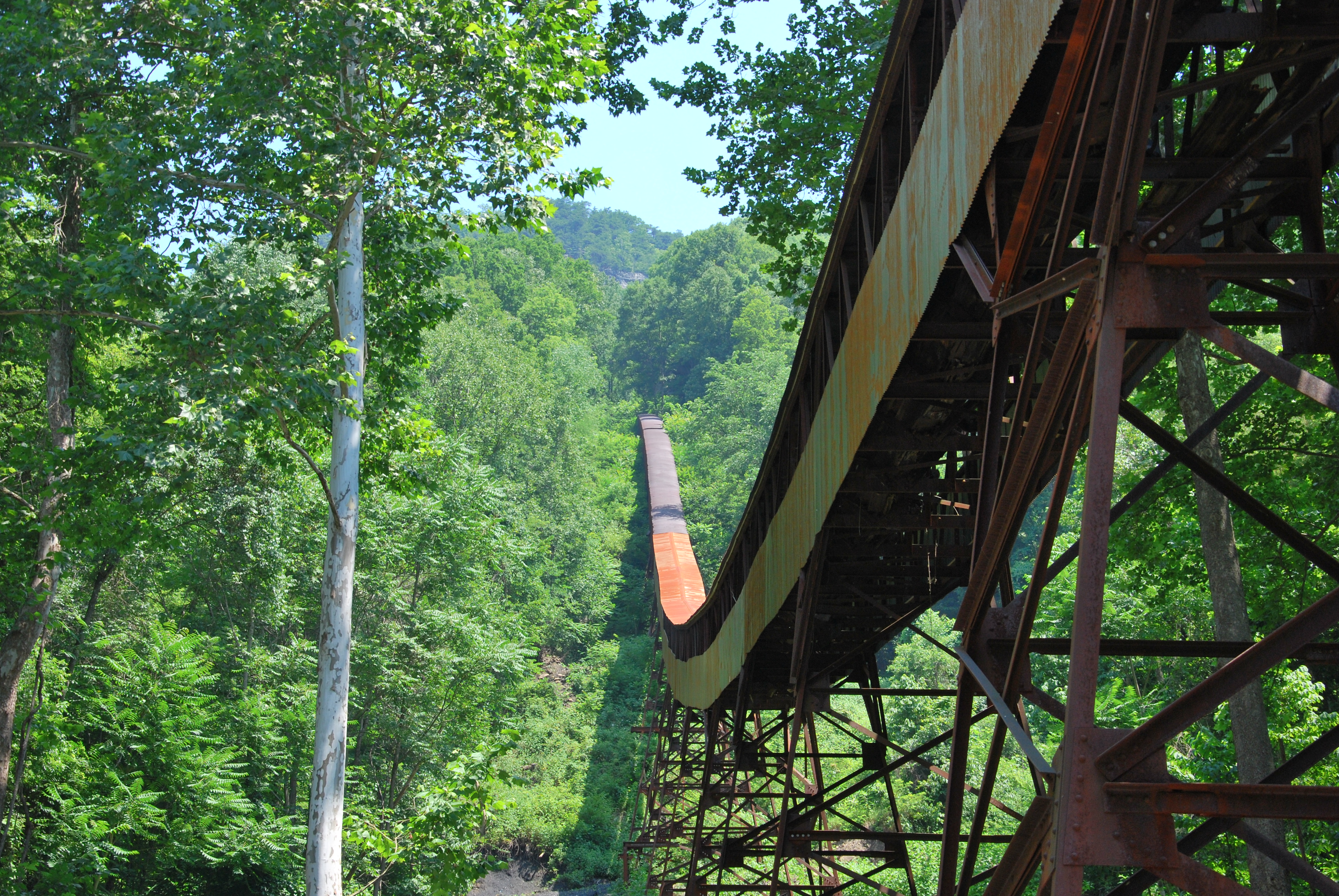

- Location within West Virginia Location within the United States
- Location: County Route 85/2, Fayette County, West Virginia
- Nearest city: Fayetteville, West Virginia
- Coordinates: 38°3′0″N 81°2′25″W
- Built: 1873
- Architect: Roberts & Schaefer Co.; Fairmont Mining Machinery Co.
- NRHP reference No.: 07000846
- Added to NRHP: August 22, 2007

The Nuttallburg Coal Mining Complex and Town Historic District is located in Fayette County, near Winona, West Virginia in New River Gorge National Park and Preserve. It produced bituminous coal while it was active. The townsite is almost directly across from the Kay Moor mine and townsite, now abandoned. Like Kay Moor, the town is built around the railroad line at the bottom of the gorge, with an array of coke ovens and mining structures, as well as a bridge across the New River to South Nuttall.

Nuttallburg was closely associated with the Nuttallburg underground mine, a room and pillar mine that was sealed in 1958. The mine was established to develop the New River Coalfield in 1870 by John Nuttall, who correctly anticipated that the Chesapeake and Ohio Railroad would be built through the New River Gorge. When the railroad arrived in 1873 Nuttall had built almost 100 houses, with 80 coke ovens, a variety of mine structures and a coal tipple on a railroad siding.

Flat land by the river was dedicated to railroad and industrial use, leaving houses to seek perches on the hillsides. The town was racially segregated with white workers on the west side of Short Creek and black workers on the east side and between the railroad and the river. Because development stretched along both banks of the river, a pedestrian suspension bridge was built across the river by the Roebling Bridge Company in 1899.

The mines in the area were acquired by the Fordson Coal Company in the 1920s as "captive mines" to supply coal to the Ford Motor Company's River Rouge plant in Dearborn, Michigan. Ford updated many of the mines' facilities at that time. However, Fordson sold the mine to the New River Coal Corporation in 1928, possibly because railroad regulations made coal transport to Michigan too difficult.

Most of the frame structures in Nuttallburg have succumbed to weather or have been salvaged for building materials. The National Park Service acquired the town, mining complex and surrounding area from the Nuttall Estate in 1998 and incorporated it into New River Gorge National River.
