= Michigan, West Virginia =

- Unincorporated community
- Location within West Virginia Location within the United States
- Coordinates: 38°4′42″N 81°5′1″W
- Country: United States
- State: West Virginia
- County: Fayette
- Elevation: 945 ft (288 m)
- Time zone: UTC-5 (Eastern (EST))
  - Summer (DST): UTC-4 (EDT)
- GNIS ID: 1556144

Michigan was an unincorporated community and coal town in Fayette County, West Virginia.

== See also ==
- List of ghost towns in West Virginia
