= National Bank of North Philadelphia =

- U.S. National Register of Historic Places
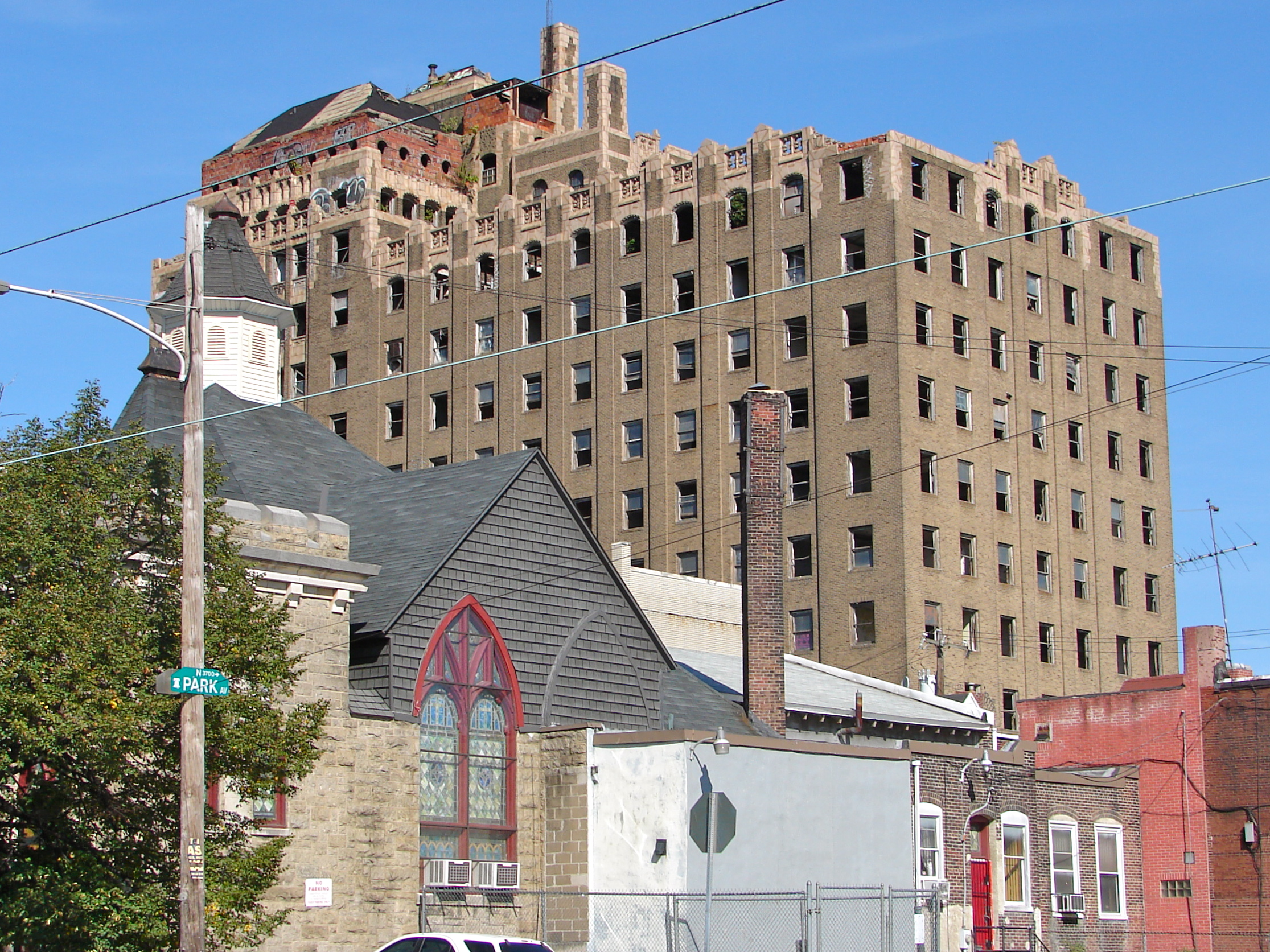
- National Bank of North Philadelphia, September 2010

- Location within Philadelphia Location within Pennsylvania Location within the United States
- Location: 3701 N. Broad St., Philadelphia, Pennsylvania
- Coordinates: 40°0′36″N 75°9′03″W
- Area: 0.1 acres (0.040 ha)
- Built: 1926
- Architect: Lee, William L.
- Architectural style: Art Deco
- NRHP reference No.: 85001131
- Added to NRHP: May 20, 1985

National Bank of North Philadelphia, also known as the Beury Building (and since at least 2015 well known by the graffiti tag "Boner 4ever" on the side of the building), is a historic bank building located in the Nicetown-Tioga neighborhood of Philadelphia, Pennsylvania. The original section was built in 1926, and is a 10- to 11-story, limestone, brick and terra cotta building in the Art Deco style. It is topped by a three-story penthouse with a pyramidal roof.

It was added to the National Register of Historic Places in 1985.

== History ==
The building was built in 1926 at the corner of Broad Street and Germantown Ave. for the Bankers Trust company. It was named the Beury Building in 1930, in honor of then director Dr. Charles E. Beury. In 1932, radio station WTEL moved its offices to the 13th and 14th floors of the building. By 1935, Bankers Trust had already moved out of the first floor of the building, when plans were drawn up to retrofit the former space into an arcade.

During World War II, Room 1018 in the building served as a rationing board office in Philadelphia. A portion of the Beury Building was also one of 28 facilities designated as an air raid shelter, and was the biggest of the 28, holding up to 2600 people, for use in both actual air raids and during drills. A new headquarters for the Selective Service opened on the third floor of the building in late 1950. In April 1961, Leo Savage, an insurance manager at the Metropolitan Life Insurance Company in the Beury Building, was attacked in the 18th-floor washroom by an attacker with a tire iron.

In 1985, the city's commerce department attempted to obtain grants in order to finance a $5.8 million renovation of the building, the same year it was listed on the National Register of Historic Places. In 1995, the building's then owner, Mohammed Mizani, pleaded guilty to conspiring to illegally remove asbestos from the building, using the unskilled labor of homeless people from the city's Center City homeless shelter. Mizani had the illegal work done twice, first in 1988, and a second time in 1992. He was sentenced to 18 months in jail in February 1996.

In 2008, at which point the building had been vacant for almost 20 years, civic leaders pushed the building as a potential new home for displaced city offices, however these efforts failed. In 2017, Shift Capital announced plans to renovate the building into 80 apartment units, 50 of which would be for low-income renters, and the others leased to those with physical disabilities, with offices and retail on the lower floors. Leasing began in 2017, ahead of any renovations. Remediation work began on February 19, 2018, scheduled for completion in early June. In February 2018, plans were announced for an annex to the Beury building, to contain 90 one bedroom and studio apartments, in addition to 20,000 square feet of retail space. By October 2019, plans had shifted, with the Beury building being renovated into a hotel with a sit-down restaurant on the ground floor, announced by civic leaders to be a Marriott. In November 2019, the project was awarded a $477,000 state grant for sidewalks, streetlights, ADA ramps, and trees. Following public outcry, developers announced they would incorporate the locally famous "Boner 4Ever" and "Forever Boner" graffiti on the sides of the building into the redevelopment.
