= Carver, West Virginia =

Unincorporated community in West Virginia, United States

- Unincorporated community
- Location within West Virginia Location within the United States
- Coordinates: 38°4′33″N 81°5′2″W
- Country: United States
- State: West Virginia
- County: Fayette
- Elevation: 883 ft (269 m)
- Time zone: UTC-5 (Eastern (EST))
  - Summer (DST): UTC-4 (EDT)
- GNIS ID: 1556063

Carver was an unincorporated community in Fayette County, West Virginia.

== See also ==
- List of ghost towns in West Virginia
