= New River Coalfield =

Coordinates: 37°56′N 81°04′W

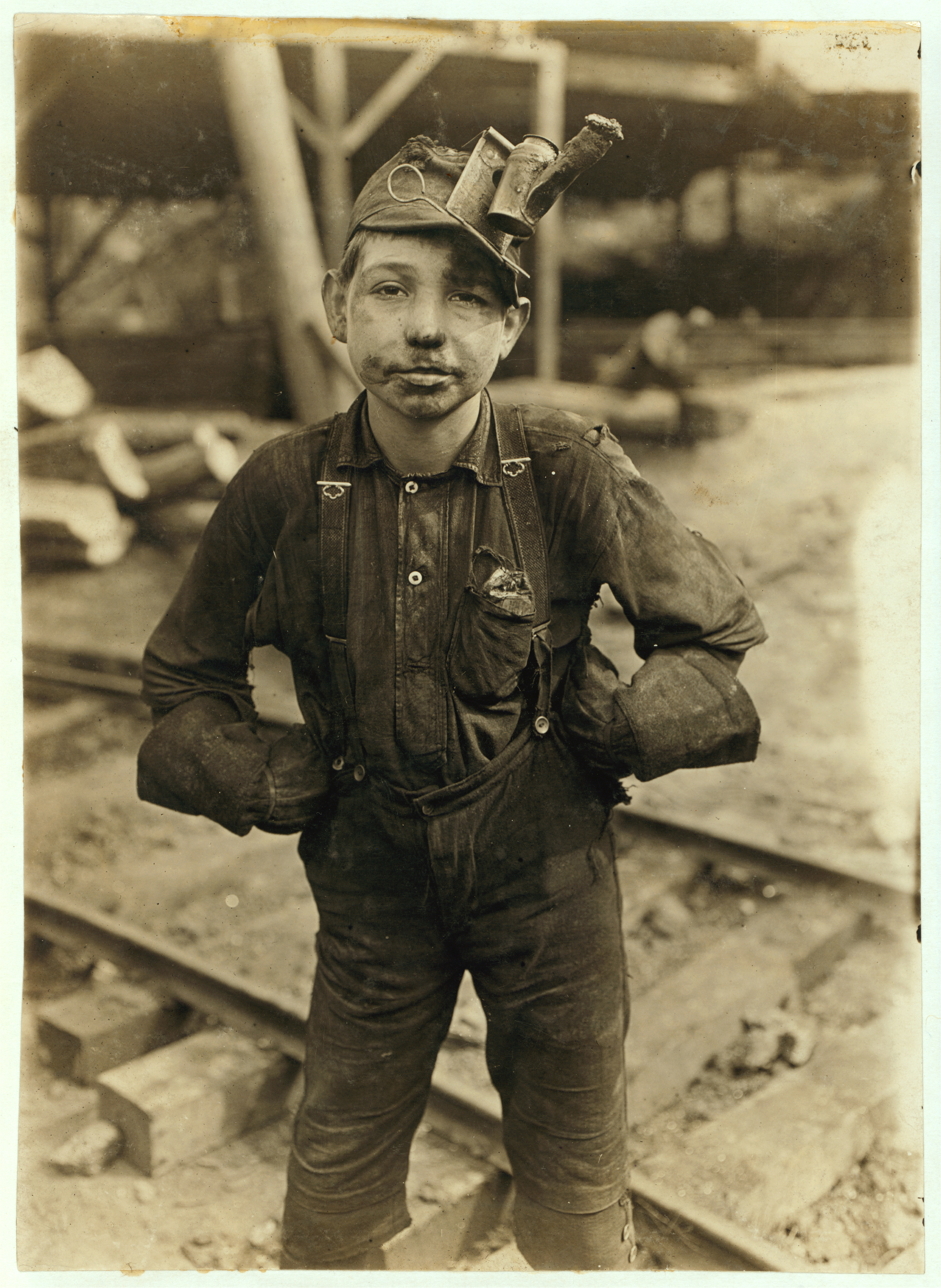
Tipple Boy, Turkey Knob Mine, MacDonald, West Virginia. photograph by Lewis Hine, 1908 during the height of coal mining in the New River Coalfield

The New River Coalfield is located in northeastern Raleigh County and southern Fayette County, West Virginia. Commercial mining of coal began in the 1870s and thrived into the 20th century. The coal in this field is a low volatile coal, known as "smokeless" coals. The seams of coal that have been mined include Sewell, Fire Creek, and Beckley. This is very high quality bituminous coal rated at approximately 15,000 BTU (16,000 kJ). The New River coalfield is named after the north flowing New River. Over 60 coal towns were once located there, supported by independent commercial districts at Beckley, Oak Hill, Mount Hope, and Fayetteville. By the 21st century many coal camps had partially or completely returned to nature. These company towns were located along Dunloup (Loup) Creek, Laurel Creek, White Oak Creek, lower Piney Creek, and, of course, the New River. The mainline of the Chesapeake and Ohio Railway ran right through the center of this coalfield, with spurs branching off in many directions, and rail yards were maintained at Quinnimont, Raleigh, and Thurmond, WV. The Virginian Railway's main line also passed through the western side of the field as well. Companies such as the New River Company, New River & Pocahontas Consolidated Coal Co., and Mary Frances Coal Co. were the largest operators in the New River Coalfield, but there were many smaller ones as well. These companies recruited native born whites, immigrants from Southern and Eastern Europe, and African Americans from the South to work in their coal mines and railroads. The mines began to close down after World War II and today there are very few active coal mines in the field. The New River Gorge is now the domain of the National Park Service as the New River Gorge National Park and Preserve, and they have done what their budget allows to preserve the coal heritage of the area.

== See also ==
- Coalfield
- New River
- Winding Gulf Coalfield - adjacent coalfield in Raleigh County
- New River Gorge National River
- Pocahontas Coalfield
- Nuttallburg Coal Mining Complex and Town Historic District
