= Glen Alum, West Virginia =

Unincorporated community in West Virginia, United States

Glen Alum
- Unincorporated community
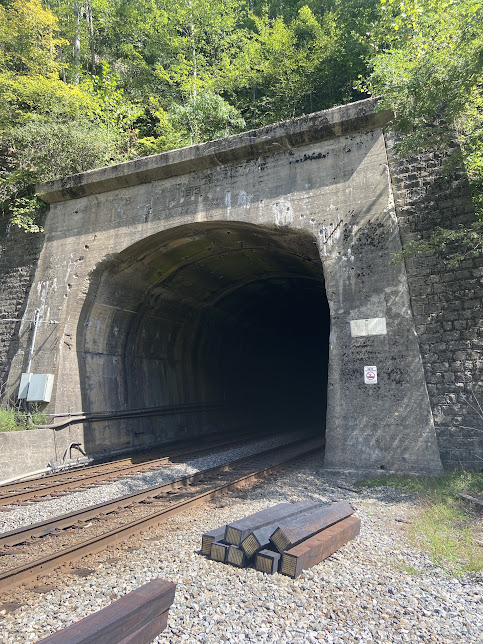
- Glen Alum railroad tunnel

- Location within the state of West Virginia Glen Alum (the United States)
- Coordinates: 37°35′5″N 81°59′34″W
- Country: United States
- State: West Virginia
- County: Mingo
- Elevation: 1,165 ft (355 m)
- Time zone: UTC-5 (Eastern (EST))
  - Summer (DST): UTC-4 (EDT)
- GNIS ID: 1549707

Glen Alum is an unincorporated community in Mingo County, West Virginia, United States. It is also spelled "Glenalum" on older topographic maps.

The community derives its name from the local Glen Alum Coal Company.

A branch of the Norfolk and Western Railway passed through the town. Alum Creek flows south through the town towards the Tug Fork.

Ruins of Millertown along Alum Creek Road south of Glen Alum mine in 1996

== See also ==
- List of ghost towns in West Virginia
