= Big Sandy, West Virginia =

Big Sandy
- Census-designated place (CDP)
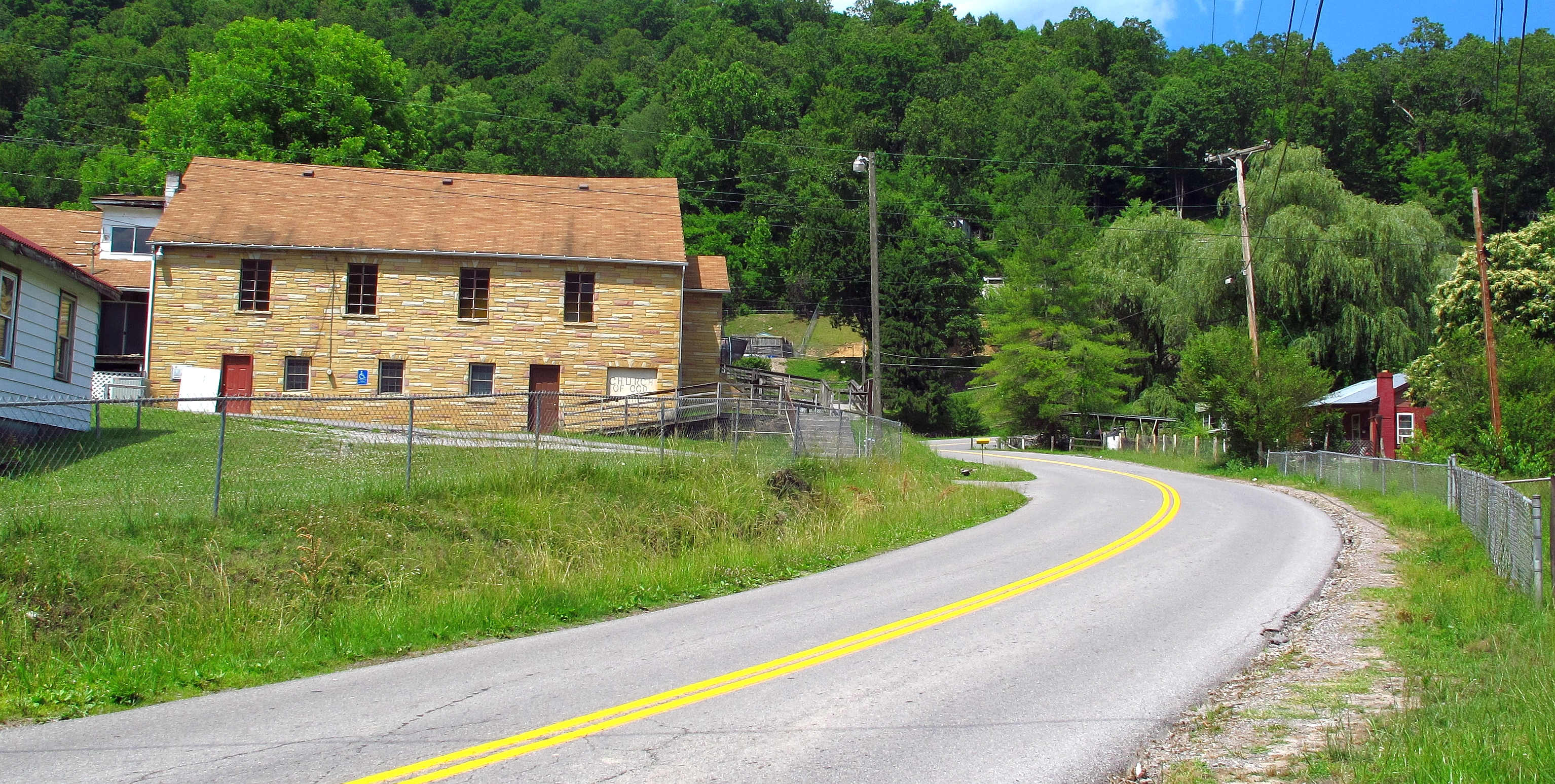
- Davy Roderfield Road in Big Sandy

- Location within the state of West Virginia
- Coordinates: 37°27′51″N 81°41′53″W
- Country: United States
- State: West Virginia
- County: McDowell

Area
  - Total: 0.553 sq mi (1.43 km^{2})
  - Land: 0.532 sq mi (1.38 km^{2})
  - Water: 0.021 sq mi (0.054 km^{2})

Population (2020)
  - Total: 198
  - Density: 372/sq mi (144/km^{2})
- Time zone: UTC-5 (Eastern (EST))
  - Summer (DST): UTC-4 (EDT)

Big Sandy is a census-designated place (CDP) located in McDowell County, West Virginia, United States. As of the 2020 census, its population is 198 (up from 168 at the 2010 census). The town's name comes from the Big Sandy River, a major tributary of the Ohio River which forms the boundary between West Virginia and Kentucky.

== See also ==
- List of ghost towns in West Virginia
