= Volcano, West Virginia =

Volcano
- Unincorporated community
- Location within the state of West Virginia Volcano (the United States)
- Coordinates: 39°13′58″N 81°17′5″W
- Country: United States
- State: West Virginia
- County: Wood
- Elevation: 899 ft (274 m)
- Time zone: UTC-5 (Eastern (EST))
  - Summer (DST): UTC-4 (EDT)
- GNIS ID: 1548687

Volcano is a ghost town in Wood County, West Virginia. It burned to the ground on August 4, 1879, in a fire that was believed to be intentional. According to The New York Times, "There were two attempts made a short time ago to burn the town, and since that time watchmen had been placed on duty. This fire was discovered just after the watchmen retired." The fire was said to have spread "rapidly" before the nearby oil-tanks burst, spreading the oil and fire throughout the rest of the town. It was never rebuilt. It was a petroleum town.

After an investigation by the Pinkerton Detective Agency, a town resident named Jim Frey was arrested on charges of starting the blaze. However, he was acquitted due to lack of evidence. While the fire damaged much of the town, oil production had already started to decline.

Yellow dog lanterns followed the endless pully system, and due to the wild paths of said pully system, and the amber yellow glow produced from the lanterns, the hillside appeared like a volcano erupting, hence the name. Its Post Office no longer exists.

The Volcano oil field was discovered in 1860, according to the West Virginia Geological and Economic Survey (WVGES), "and from 1865 to 1870, drilling was very active, producing from the Salt sand at a depth of about 360 feet. The first major strike in the Volcano oil field occurred March 6, 1865 on Buffalo Run in Ritchie County. The first well in the Wood County sector of the Volcano field was drilled in May 1865. A later strike in September 1865 produced high-quality crude suitable for lubricating and selling for $30 per barrel.

The heavy lubricants produced led to the development of West Virginia's first oil pipeline, from Volcano to Parkersburg, in 1879." It is estimated that Volcano produced more than 2.5 million barrels of oil from 1860 to 1960.

In 1874, W.C. Stiles, Jr., employed the endless-wire method of pumping many wells from a central engine, "a technique he invented," according to the WVGES. "Using wheels, belts, and cables, perhaps as many as 40 wells could be pumped by one engine. One of the systems operated until 1974."

The town had a reputation for being tough and wild. A Sunday afternoon visitor in 1888 reported "continual fighting, drinking and other disturbance going on" and thugs, gamblers and prostitutes operating freely even though W.C. Stiles had hired "rowdies" to keep order.

The Volcano town-site is located south of the US-50 expressway at the junction of Wood County Routes 5 and 28.

== Legacy ==
Since 1893, a memorial dinner has been hosted in memory of the town, along with the Volcano Days antique and engine show.

== See also ==
- List of ghost towns in West Virginia
