= Emmett, West Virginia =

Unincorporated community in West Virginia, United States

- Unincorporated community
- Location within West Virginia Location within the United States
- Coordinates: 37°40′57″N 81°49′37″W
- Country: United States
- State: West Virginia
- County: Logan
- Elevation: 840 ft (260 m)
- Time zone: UTC-5 (Eastern (EST))
  - Summer (DST): UTC-4 (EDT)
- Area codes: 304 & 681
- GNIS feature ID: 1554401

Emmett is an unincorporated community in Logan County, West Virginia, United States. Emmett is located on Elk Creek, County Route 11/1, and the CSX Railroad, 4.8 miles (7.7 km) southeast of Man. Emmett had a post office, which closed on March 7, 1998.

The community was named after Franklin Emmett King, a mining official.

== See also ==
- List of ghost towns in West Virginia
