= Gad, West Virginia =

Gad
- Ghost town
- Location within the state of West Virginia Gad (the United States)
- Coordinates: 38°14′23″N 80°53′3″W
- Country: United States
- State: West Virginia
- County: Nicholas
- Time zone: UTC-5 (Eastern (EST))
  - Summer (DST): UTC-4 (EDT)

Gad is an extinct town in Nicholas County, West Virginia, United States. The community was located on McKee's Creek, but was purchased by the US Army Corps of Engineers for the construction of Summersville Lake, which opened on September 3, 1966.

The site of the town is now located under the lake near the marina.

The community most likely was named after the Gadd family.

Next to Gad was a town named Sparks, which also saw residents relocate and is now covered in water. During winter months on select years, the volume of the lake will be released and let down so the dam can be monitored and checked for damage. During that time, the old roads and some old foundations of homes that were previously located in Sparks and Gad can be seen. Sometimes marbles and trinkets can be found.
