= Thacker Creek =

Stream in West Virginia, U.S.

Coordinates: 37°35′37″N 82°07′57″W

Thacker Creek is a stream in the U.S. state of West Virginia.

Thacker Creek was named after Reuben Thacker, a pioneer settler.

== See also ==
- List of rivers of West Virginia
