= Wyndal, West Virginia =

- Unincorporated community
- Location within West Virginia Location within the United States
- Coordinates: 38°12′52″N 81°10′55″W
- Country: United States
- State: West Virginia
- County: Fayette
- Elevation: 692 ft (211 m)
- Time zone: UTC-5 (Eastern (EST))
  - Summer (DST): UTC-4 (EDT)
- GNIS ID: 1556033

Wyndal is an unincorporated community and coal town in Fayette County, West Virginia, United States. Their post office closed in 1930.

== See also ==
- List of ghost towns in West Virginia
