= Fayette, West Virginia =

Unincorporated community in West Virginia, United States

- Unincorporated community
- Location within West Virginia Location within the United States
- Coordinates: 38°3′48″N 81°4′24″W
- Country: United States
- State: West Virginia
- County: Fayette

Population (2010)
  - Total: 46,039
- Time zone: UTC-5 (Eastern (EST))
  - Summer (DST): UTC-4 (EDT)

Fayette (also Fayette Station) is an unincorporated community in Fayette County, West Virginia, United States. Its elevation is 919 feet (280 m).

== See also ==
- List of ghost towns in West Virginia
