= Cunard, West Virginia =

Unincorporated community in West Virginia, United States

- Unincorporated community
- Location within West Virginia Location within the United States
- Coordinates: 37°59′55″N 81°02′22″W
- Country: United States
- State: West Virginia
- County: Fayette
- Elevation: 1,598 ft (487 m)

Population (2020)
  - Total: 98
- Time zone: UTC-5 (Eastern (EST))
  - Summer (DST): UTC-4 (EDT)
- ZIP codes: 25830
- Area codes: 304 & 681
- GNIS feature ID: 1554242

Cunard is an unincorporated community in Fayette County, West Virginia, United States. Cunard is 5 miles (8.0 km) southeast of Fayetteville. As a census-designated place, the population of Cunard was 98 at the 2020 census.

The community was named for the proprietor of a local mine.

== See also ==
- List of ghost towns in West Virginia
