= Brooklyn, Fayette County, West Virginia =

Unincorporated community in West Virginia, United States

- Unincorporated community
- Location within West Virginia Location within the United States
- Coordinates: 37°59′27″N 81°2′55″W
- Country: United States
- State: West Virginia
- County: Fayette
- Elevation: 1,637 ft (499 m)
- Time zone: UTC-5 (Eastern (EST))
  - Summer (DST): UTC-4 (EDT)
- GNIS ID: 1553983

Brooklyn is an unincorporated community in Fayette County, West Virginia, United States. Their post office closed in 1966.

== See also ==
- List of ghost towns in West Virginia
