= Fire Creek, West Virginia =

Unincorporated community in West Virginia, United States

- Ghost town
- Location within West Virginia Location within the United States
- Coordinates: 37°57′30″N 81°1′44″W
- Country: United States
- State: West Virginia
- County: Fayette
- Elevation: 1,033 ft (315 m)
- Time zone: UTC-5 (Eastern (EST))
  - Summer (DST): UTC-4 (EDT)
- GNIS ID: 1556100

Fire Creek is a ghost town in Fayette County, West Virginia, United States. It was located on the New River Gorge.

Founded in 1873, Fire Creek was one of the first towns that turned coal into coke.

== Notable people ==
- Claud Ashton Jones - former Rear Admiral and Medal of Honor recipient.
