= Loopemount, West Virginia =

- Unincorporated community
- Location within West Virginia Location within the United States
- Coordinates: 37°50′36″N 80°20′59″W
- Country: United States
- State: West Virginia
- County: Greenbrier
- Elevation: 1,847 ft (563 m)
- Time zone: UTC-5 (Eastern (EST))
  - Summer (DST): UTC-4 (EDT)
- Area codes: 304 & 681
- GNIS feature ID: 1554996

Loopemount is an unincorporated community in Greenbrier County, West Virginia, United States. Loopemount is located on the Greenbrier River, 6 miles (9.7 km) northeast of Lewisburg.
