= Jacobs Fork, West Virginia =

Jacobs Fork
- Unincorporated community
- Location within West Virginia Jacobs Fork (the United States)
- Coordinates: 37°13′40″N 81°35′34″W
- Country: United States
- State: West Virginia
- County: McDowell
- Elevation: 1,706 ft (520 m)
- Time zone: UTC-5 (Eastern (EST))
  - Summer (DST): UTC-4 (EDT)
- Area codes: 304 & 681
- GNIS feature ID: 1554793

Jacobs Fork is an unincorporated community in McDowell County, West Virginia, United States. Jacobs Fork is located on West Virginia Route 16, 7.5 miles (12.1 km) southeast of War.
