= Ingram Branch, West Virginia =

- Unincorporated community
- Location within West Virginia Location within the United States
- Coordinates: 38°1′4″N 81°14′20″W
- Country: United States
- State: West Virginia
- County: Fayette
- Elevation: 1,322 ft (403 m)
- Time zone: UTC-5 (Eastern (EST))
  - Summer (DST): UTC-4 (EDT)
- GNIS feature ID: 1540707

Ingram Branch is an unincorporated community located in Fayette County, West Virginia, United States.

The community took its name from nearby Ingram Branch, a creek which was named after James Ingram, a pioneer settler.

== Gallery ==
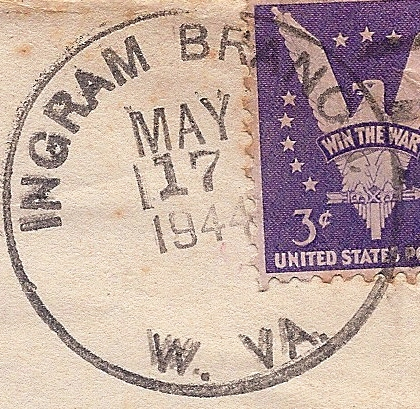
Ingram postmark

== See also ==
- List of ghost towns in West Virginia
