= Turkey Knob, West Virginia =

- Unincorporated community
- Location within West Virginia Location within the United States
- Coordinates: 37°53′56″N 81°9′10″W
- Country: United States
- State: West Virginia
- County: Fayette
- Elevation: 1,690 ft (520 m)
- Time zone: UTC-5 (Eastern (EST))
  - Summer (DST): UTC-4 (EDT)
- GNIS ID: 1548348

Turkey Knob was an unincorporated community and coal town in Fayette County, West Virginia, United States.

== See also ==
- List of ghost towns in West Virginia
