= Lawton, West Virginia =

- Unincorporated community
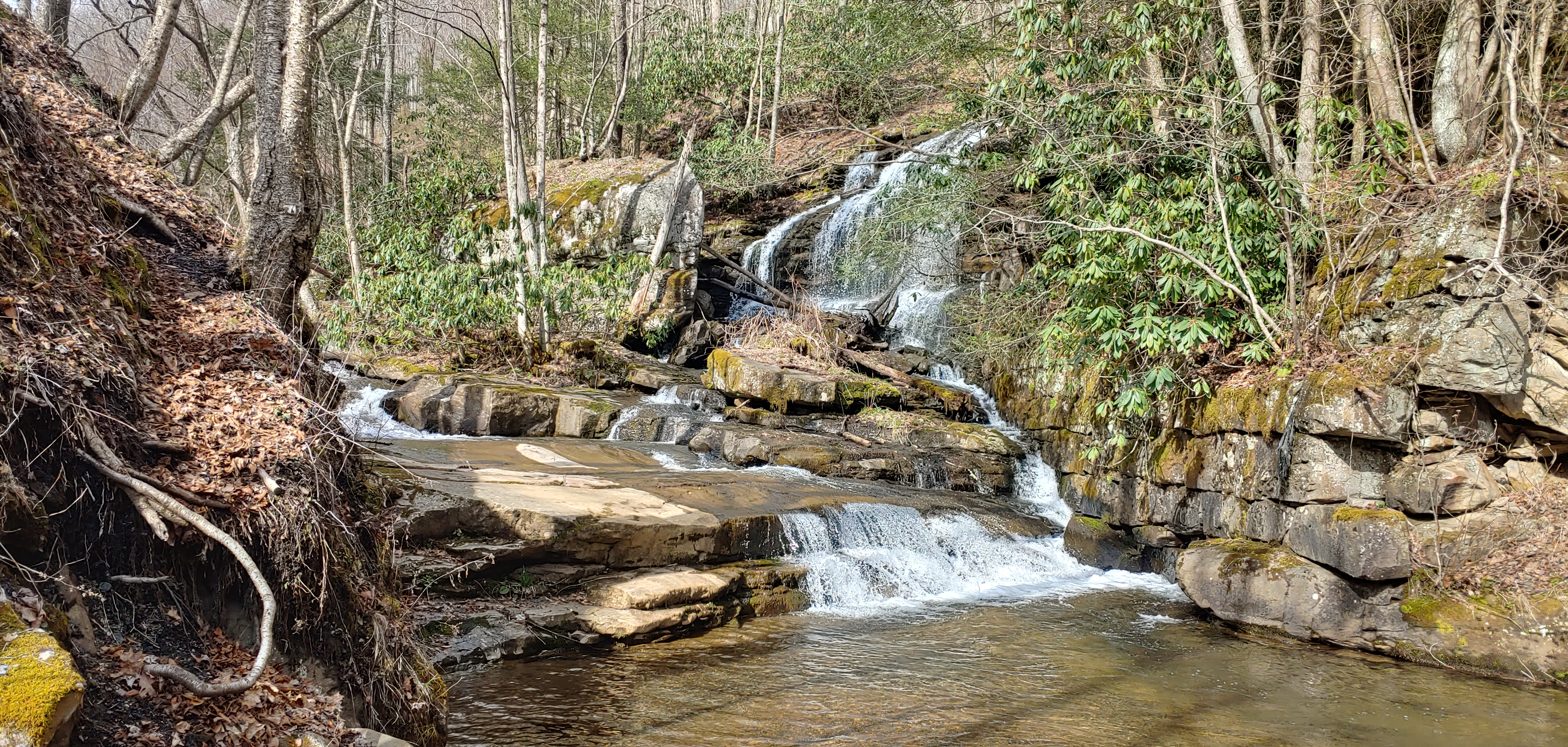
- Landscape near Lawton

- Location within West Virginia Location within the United States
- Coordinates: 37°52′16″N 80°58′37″W
- Country: United States
- State: West Virginia
- County: Fayette
- Elevation: 1,988 ft (606 m)
- Time zone: UTC-5 (Eastern (EST))
  - Summer (DST): UTC-4 (EDT)
- Area codes: 304 & 681
- GNIS feature ID: 1556135

Lawton is an unincorporated community in Fayette County, West Virginia, United States. Lawton is 7 miles (11 km) west of Meadow Bridge.
