= Honeydew, West Virginia =

Unincorporated community in the United States

- Unincorporated community
- Location within West Virginia Location within the United States
- Coordinates: 38°2′4″N 80°49′47″W
- Country: United States
- State: West Virginia
- County: Fayette
- Elevation: 2,346 ft (715 m)
- Time zone: UTC-5 (Eastern (EST))
  - Summer (DST): UTC-4 (EDT)
- GNIS ID: 1556122

Honeydew was an unincorporated community in Fayette County, West Virginia, United States.

== See also ==
- List of ghost towns in West Virginia
