= Kay Moor, West Virginia =

- Kay Moor
- U.S. National Register of Historic Places
- U.S. Historic district
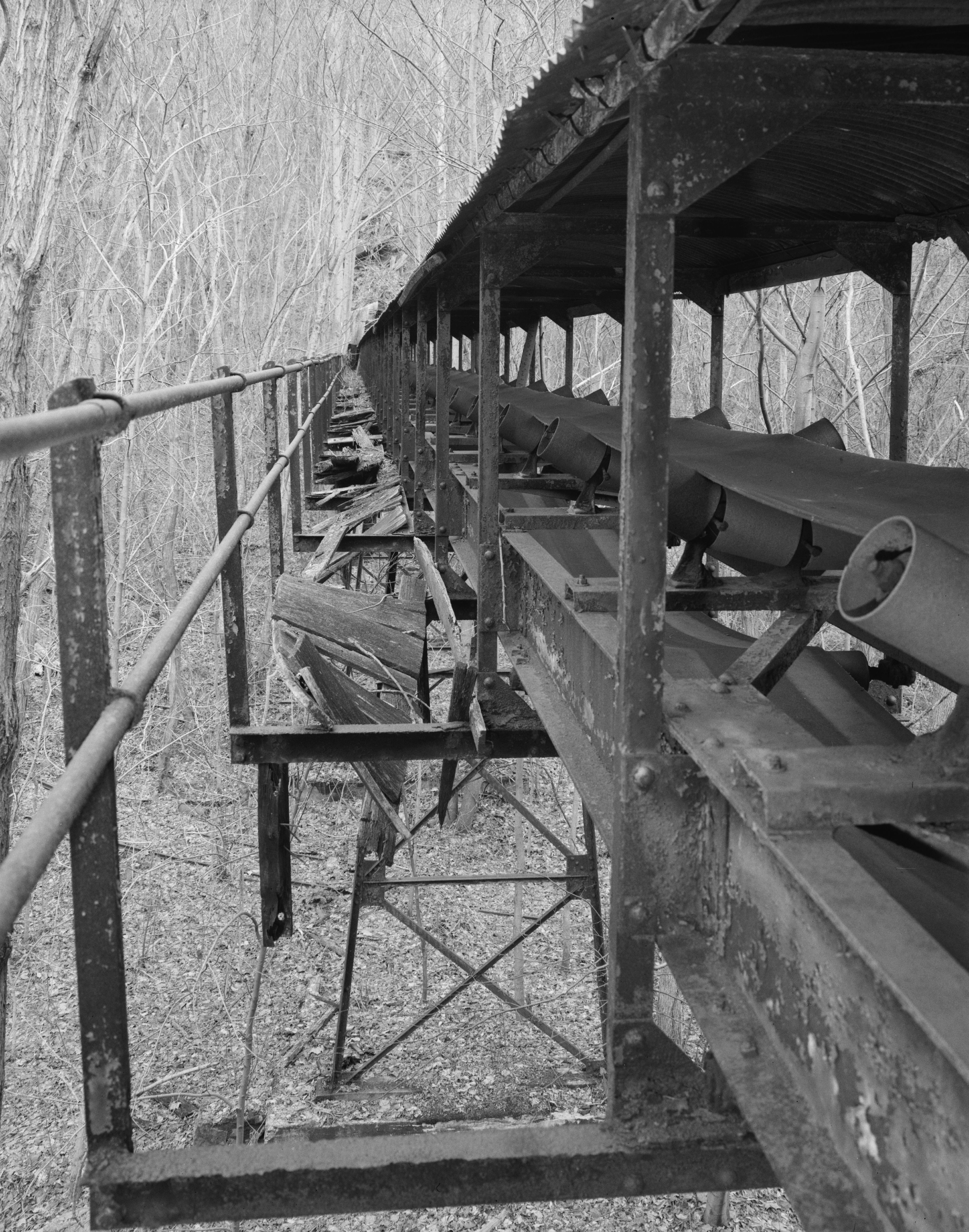

- Location within West Virginia Location within the United States
- Location: Fayette County, West Virginia
- Nearest city: Fayetteville, West Virginia
- Coordinates: 38°2′52″N 81°3′53″W
- Built: 1900
- Architect: Low Moor Iron Co.; New River & Pocahontas Consolidated
- Architectural style: Mining structures
- NRHP reference No.: 90001641
- Added to NRHP: November 8, 1990

Kay Moor, also known as Kaymoor, is the site of an abandoned coal mine, coal-processing plant, and coal town near Fayetteville, West Virginia. The town site is located in the New River Gorge at Kaymoor Bottom (38°03′00″N 81°03′17″W). It is linked to the mine portal 560 feet (170 m) above on Sewell Bench (38°02′52″N 81°03′58″W) in the wall of the Gorge by conveyors.

The mine exploited the New River Coalfield's Sewell Seam of "smokeless" low-volatile bituminous coal, while the town site was accessible only by the Chesapeake and Ohio Railway's mainline in the gorge. The last portion of the Kay Moor complex, Kaymoor Top (38°02′48″N 81°04′09″W) was located at the gorge rim and served as the terminus for the mountain haulage.

== History ==
The mine property was purchased in 1873 by Abiel Abbot Low, managing director of the Low Moor Iron Company in Low Moor, Virginia, which was to be the mine's chief client. The property was kept in reserve until 1899, when the Kay Moor mine was opened to supply coal and coke to the company's blast furnaces. In 1925, the mine was sold to the New River and Pocahontas Consolidated Coal Company, a subsidiary of the Berwind-White Corporation of Philadelphia.

The town was named for James Kay, a Low Moor Iron Company employee, who was in charge of building the town. Fifty houses were built in 1901, followed by 45 in 1902 and 17 in 1905. A suburb, called New Camp, was built in 1918–1919 with another 19-24 houses, and represents the only extant town site remaining. Kay Moor town's public facilities were spartan, with no churches, saloons, banks, or town hall, only pairs of segregated schools at top and bottom, company stores, a pool hall and a ball field. By 1952, Kaymoor Bottom had been abandoned, and in 1960, most of its structures were destroyed by fire.

The mine was connected to the town by a single-track incline, which lifted workers and equipment up a 1,000-foot (300 m) slope at a 30° incline. Coal was moved along a similar double-track incline, which lowered coal to the processing plant and the coke ovens, with the cars or monitors moving in opposite directions and partially counterbalancing each other. Both inclines operated until 1962. Initial operations included 120 coking ovens, which were increased to 202 ovens during World War I. All of the beehive ovens closed in the 1930s, as they had become obsolete.

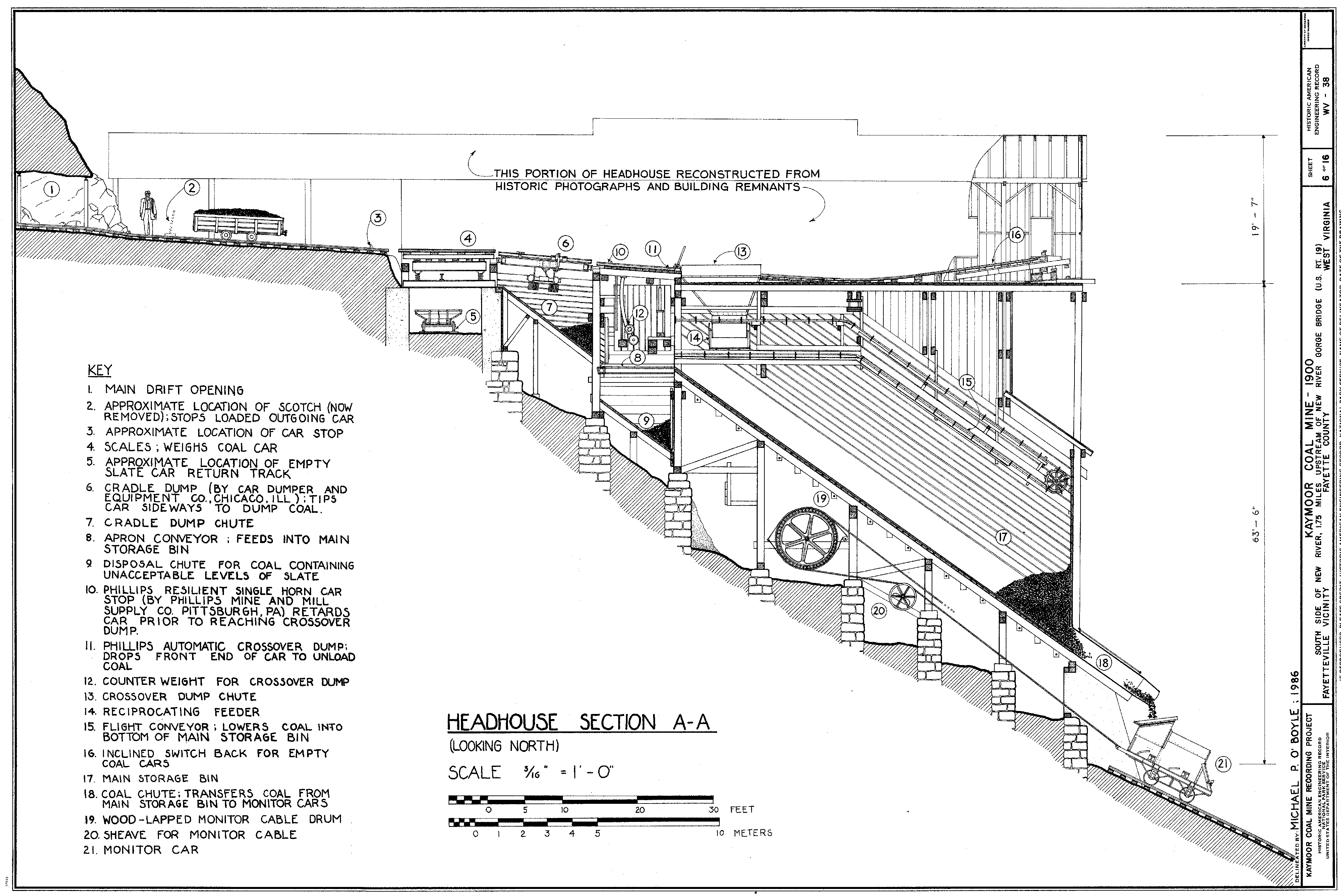
HAER drawing of Kay Moor headhouse

The mine itself was a room and pillar mine that was first worked with mule-drawn railcars. Locomotives later supplanted the mules.

== Kay Moor today ==
The site is now extensively overgrown and obscured by foliage. Structures and machinery have deteriorated due to the corrosive interaction of coal dust and rainwater, while the bench level was salvaged in 1980–81. Despite this, the site retains significant amounts of mining machinery and is considered one of the most complete examples of an integrated coal mine and company town in West Virginia.

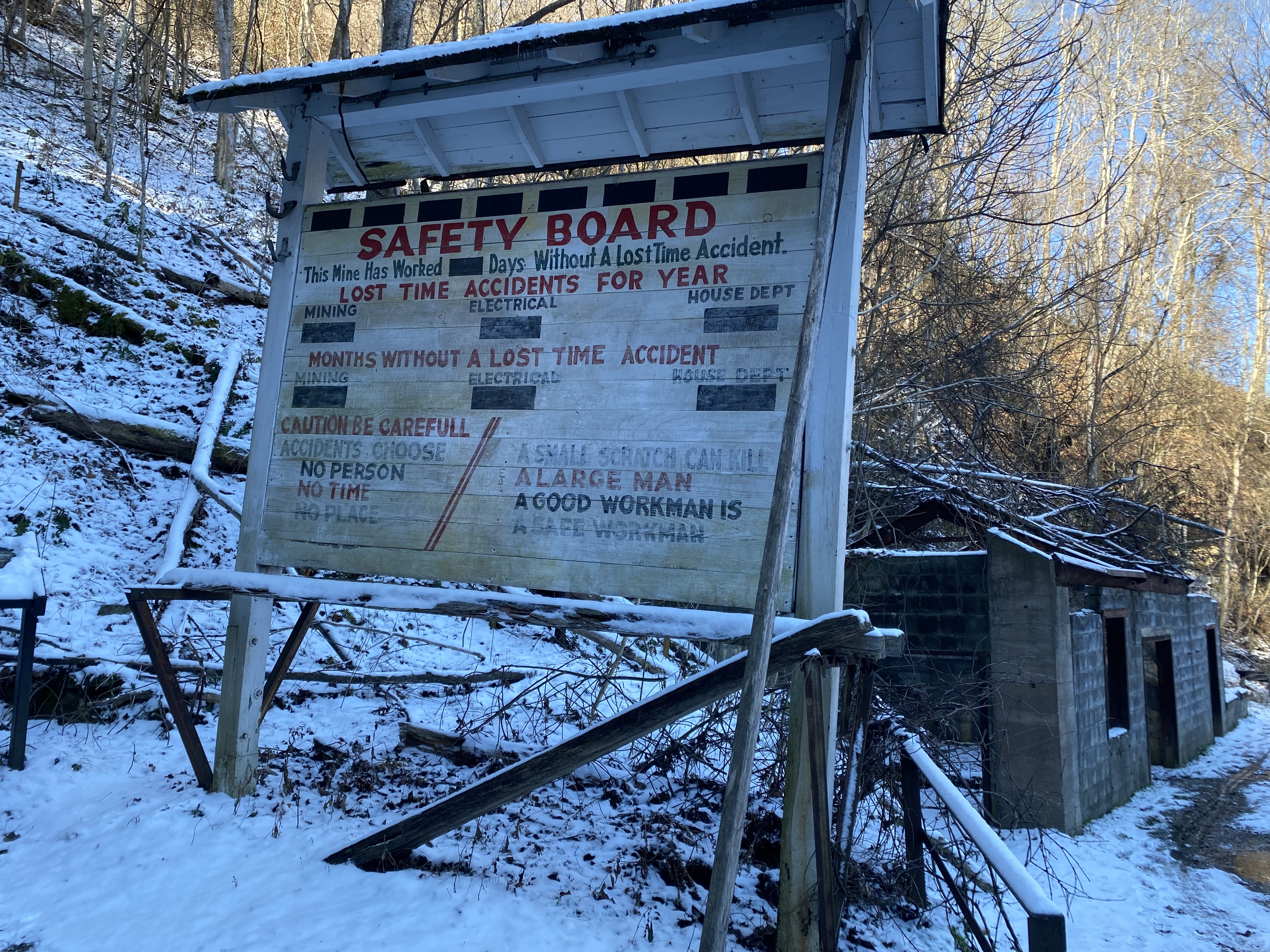
Historic signs outside of Kay Moor coal mine taken in Winter 2022.

The entire Kay Moor site is now located within the boundaries of New River Gorge National Park and Preserve.

== Visiting Kay Moor ==
Kaymoor Top is accessible from Kaymoor No. 1 Road (County Route 9/2). At Kaymoor Top, a trailhead for the Kaymoor Miners Trail provides the most direct access to the Kaymoor Mine level (via stairs and switchbacks), and then to Kaymoor Bottom via stairs. The Kaymoor Mine level is also accessible via the 2-mile (3.2 km) long, relatively flat, Kaymoor Trail; a trailhead is located on County Route 82.

== See also ==
- Nuttallburg Coal Mining Complex and Town Historic District, a similar town across the New River, listed on the National Register of Historic Places
- Thurmond Historic District, a railroad town in the New River Gorge that is still nominally inhabited
