= Long Branch, Fayette County, West Virginia =

- Unincorporated community
- Location within West Virginia Location within the United States
- Coordinates: 37°55′22″N 81°16′32″W
- Country: United States
- State: West Virginia
- County: Fayette
- Elevation: 1,726 ft (526 m)
- Time zone: UTC-5 (Eastern (EST))
  - Summer (DST): UTC-4 (EDT)
- Area codes: 304 & 681
- GNIS feature ID: 1554991

Long Branch is an unincorporated community in Fayette County, West Virginia, United States. Long Branch is located near the West Virginia Turnpike, 1.1 miles (1.8 km) northwest of Pax. Long Branch had a post office, which closed on October 3, 1998.

The community was named for a nearby and relatively long network of creeks and valleys.

== See also ==
- List of ghost towns in West Virginia
