= Harvey, West Virginia =

- Unincorporated community
- Location within West Virginia Location within the United States
- Coordinates: 37°55′57″N 81°08′20″W
- Country: United States
- State: West Virginia
- County: Fayette
- Elevation: 1,568 ft (478 m)
- Time zone: UTC−5 (Eastern (EST))
  - Summer (DST): UTC−4 (EDT)
- Area codes: 304 & 681
- GNIS feature ID: 1540040

Harvey is an unincorporated community in Fayette County, West Virginia, United States. Harvey is located on County Route 25, 2.8 miles (4.5 km) south-southeast of Oak Hill.

== History ==
Harvey had a post office, which closed on February 13, 1988. The community has the name of one Mr. Harvey, a local farmer.
