= Redstar, West Virginia =

- Unincorporated community
- Location within West Virginia Location within the United States
- Coordinates: 37°56′07″N 81°08′47″W
- Country: United States
- State: West Virginia
- County: Fayette
- Elevation: 1,703 ft (519 m)
- Time zone: UTC-5 (Eastern (EST))
  - Summer (DST): UTC-4 (EDT)
- Area codes: 304 & 681
- GNIS feature ID: 1555459

Redstar is an unincorporated community in Fayette County, West Virginia, United States. Redstar is 2.5 miles (4.0 km) south of Oak Hill. Redstar had a post office with ZIP code 25914, which closed on January 20, 2007.

The community has existed under the name Redstar since at least 1893.

== Climate ==
The climate in this area has mild differences between highs and lows, and there is adequate rainfall year-round. According to the Köppen Climate Classification system, Redstar has a marine west coast climate, abbreviated "Cfb" on climate maps.
