= Kilsyth, West Virginia =

- Unincorporated community
- Location within West Virginia Location within the United States
- Coordinates: 37°53′25″N 81°10′56″W
- Country: United States
- State: West Virginia
- County: Fayette
- Incorporation: 1903
- Elevation: 1,919 ft (585 m)
- Time zone: UTC-5 (Eastern (EST))
  - Summer (DST): UTC-4 (EDT)
- Area codes: 304 & 681
- GNIS feature ID: 1554875

Kilsyth is an unincorporated community in Fayette County, West Virginia, United States. Kilsyth is 1 mile (1.6 km) west-southwest of Mount Hope.

== History ==
The community's name is a transfer from Kilsyth, in Scotland. Kilsyth had a post office, which opened on May 3, 1902, and closed on July 23, 2005. Kilsyth was incorporated in 1903.

== See also ==
- List of ghost towns in West Virginia
