= Yerba, West Virginia =

Yerba
- Unincorporated community
- Location within West Virginia Yerba (the United States)
- Coordinates: 37°29′34″N 81°37′26″W
- Country: United States
- State: West Virginia
- County: McDowell
- Elevation: 1,394 ft (425 m)
- Time zone: UTC-5 (Eastern (EST))
  - Summer (DST): UTC-4 (EDT)
- Area codes: 304 & 681
- GNIS feature ID: 1556038

Yerba is an unincorporated community in McDowell County, West Virginia, United States. Yerba is 2 miles (3.2 km) northeast of Davy.
