= Rush Run, West Virginia =

- Unincorporated community
- Location within West Virginia Location within the United States
- Coordinates: 37°57′52″N 81°3′56″W
- Country: United States
- State: West Virginia
- County: Fayette
- Elevation: 1,089 ft (332 m)
- Time zone: UTC-5 (Eastern (EST))
  - Summer (DST): UTC-4 (EDT)
- GNIS ID: 1556191

Rush Run was an unincorporated community and coal town in Fayette County, West Virginia, United States.

The community takes its name from nearby Rush Run. A post office was opened there in 1889 and closed in 1939.

== See also ==
- List of ghost towns in West Virginia
