= Harewood, West Virginia =

- Unincorporated community
- Location within West Virginia Location within the United States
- Coordinates: 38°09′26″N 81°17′29″W
- Country: United States
- State: West Virginia
- County: Fayette
- Elevation: 860 ft (260 m)
- Time zone: UTC-5 (Eastern (EST))
  - Summer (DST): UTC-4 (EDT)
- GNIS ID: 1554646

Harewood is an unincorporated community and coal town in Fayette County, West Virginia, United States. Harewood is located within the city boundaries of Smithers.

== See also ==
- List of ghost towns in West Virginia
