= Collinsdale, West Virginia =

Unincorporated community in West Virginia, United States

- Unincorporated community
- Location within West Virginia Location within the United States
- Coordinates: 38°2′9″N 81°21′48″W
- Country: United States
- State: West Virginia
- County: Fayette
- Elevation: 892 ft (272 m)
- Time zone: UTC-5 (Eastern (EST))
  - Summer (DST): UTC-4 (EDT)
- GNIS ID: 1554180

Collinsdale is an unincorporated community and coal town in Fayette County, West Virginia, United States. It was also known as Hickory Camp.
