= Wilmore, West Virginia =

Wilmore
- Unincorporated community
- Location within the state of West Virginia Wilmore (the United States)
- Coordinates: 37°27′31″N 81°45′8″W
- Country: United States
- State: West Virginia
- County: McDowell
- Elevation: 1,027 ft (313 m)
- Time zone: UTC-5 (Eastern (EST))
  - Summer (DST): UTC-4 (EDT)
- GNIS ID: 1549206

Wilmore is an unincorporated community in McDowell County, West Virginia, United States.
