= Krollitz, West Virginia =

Krollitz
- Unincorporated community
- Location within West Virginia Krollitz (the United States)
- Coordinates: 37°28′18″N 81°51′37″W
- Country: United States
- State: West Virginia
- County: McDowell
- Elevation: 965 ft (294 m)
- Time zone: UTC-5 (Eastern (EST))
  - Summer (DST): UTC-4 (EDT)
- Area codes: 304 & 681
- GNIS feature ID: 1554897

Krollitz is an unincorporated community in McDowell County, West Virginia, United States. Krollitz is 2.8 miles (4.5 km) west of Iaeger.

The town is on the Norfolk Southern Railway (former Norfolk and Western) network and the Tug Fork river.
