= Marting, West Virginia =

- Unincorporated community
- Location within West Virginia Location within the United States
- Coordinates: 38°12′7″N 81°15′10″W
- Country: United States
- State: West Virginia
- County: Fayette
- Elevation: 909 ft (277 m)
- Time zone: UTC-5 (Eastern (EST))
  - Summer (DST): UTC-4 (EDT)
- GNIS ID: 1549811

Marting is an unincorporated community and coal town in Fayette County, West Virginia, United States, situated along Smithers Creek.

== See also ==
- List of ghost towns in West Virginia
