= Elverton, West Virginia =

Unincorporated community in West Virginia, United States

- Unincorporated community
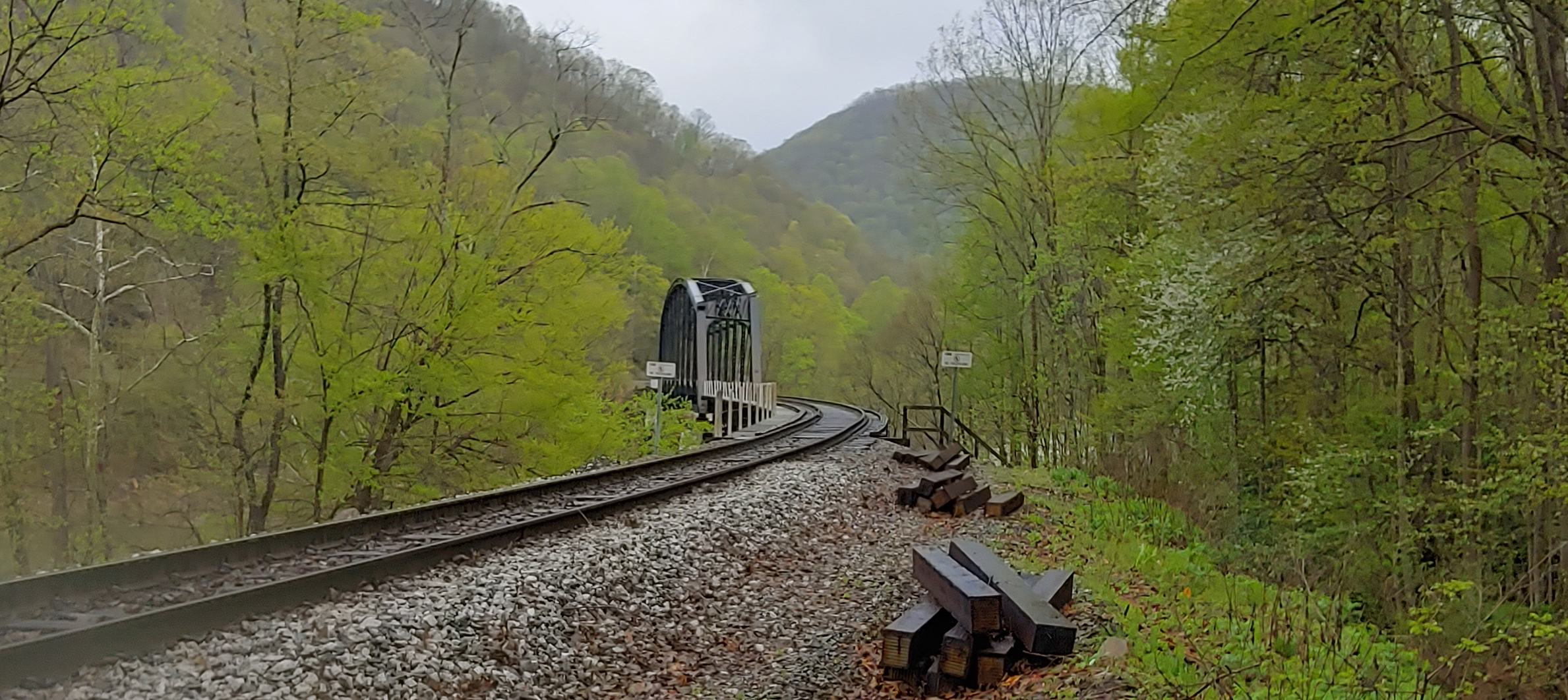

- Location within West Virginia Location within the United States
- Coordinates: 38°1′40″N 81°2′4″W
- Country: United States
- State: West Virginia
- County: Fayette
- Elevation: 1,010 ft (310 m)
- Time zone: UTC-5 (Eastern (EST))
  - Summer (DST): UTC-4 (EDT)
- GNIS ID: 1554397

Elverton is an unincorporated community and coal town in Fayette County, West Virginia, United States.

The town was established in 1898 by The Chapman Coal and Coke Company. At its peak, Elverton had a company store, a theater, a pool room, and two schools, one for white children, and another for black children. A violent miners strike occurred in Elverton in 1914, in which over 200 rounds of ammunition were fired at the company store. The mine closed in 1951, and the residents subsequently left Elverton.

== See also ==
- List of ghost towns in West Virginia
