= Perlytown, West Virginia =

Perlytown
- Unincorporated community
- Location within the state of West Virginia Perlytown (the United States)
- Coordinates: 38°58′58″N 79°33′16″W
- Country: United States
- State: West Virginia
- County: Randolph
- Elevation: 2,106 ft (642 m)
- Time zone: UTC-5 (Eastern (EST))
  - Summer (DST): UTC-4 (EDT)
- GNIS ID: 1727106

Perlytown was an unincorporated community in Randolph County, West Virginia.
