= Carbondale, West Virginia =

Unincorporated community in West Virginia, United States

- Unincorporated community
- Location within West Virginia Location within the United States
- Coordinates: 38°11′10″N 81°17′57″W
- Country: United States
- State: West Virginia
- County: Fayette
- Elevation: 640 ft (200 m)
- Time zone: UTC-5 (Eastern (EST))
  - Summer (DST): UTC-4 (EDT)
- GNIS ID: 1537034

Carbondale is an unincorporated community and coal town in Fayette County, West Virginia, United States.

The community most likely was named for the production of coal, a carbon-based fuel.

Carbondale is located within the city boundaries of Smithers.

== Notable people ==
- Donny Kees - musician and songwriter

== See also ==
- List of ghost towns in West Virginia
