= Sewell, West Virginia =

- Unincorporated community
- Location within West Virginia Location within the United States
- Coordinates: 37°59′50″N 81°01′15″W
- Country: United States
- State: West Virginia
- County: Fayette
- Elevation: 1,014 ft (309 m)
- Time zone: UTC-5 (Eastern (EST))
  - Summer (DST): UTC-4 (EDT)
- Area codes: 304 & 681
- GNIS feature ID: 1555591

Sewell is an unincorporated community in Fayette County, West Virginia, United States. Sewell is located on the New River, 6 miles (9.7 km) southeast of Fayetteville. Sewell was the sight of a major coking operation with 193 beehive coke ovens operating in the late nineteenth century and early to mid twentieth century. The operation was serviced by the Mann's Creek Railroad between 1886 and 1955.

The community was named after Stephen Sewell, a pioneer settler.

== See also ==
- List of ghost towns in West Virginia
