= Ames, West Virginia =

Unincorporated community in West Virginia, United States

- Unincorporated community
- Location within West Virginia Location within the United States
- Coordinates: 38°5′10″N 81°5′9″W
- Country: United States
- State: West Virginia
- County: Fayette
- Elevation: 909 ft (277 m)
- Time zone: UTC-5 (Eastern (EST))
  - Summer (DST): UTC-4 (EDT)
- GNIS ID: 1553726

Ames is an unincorporated community in Fayette County, West Virginia, United States. It was also known as Elmo, a now defunct coal town.

The last production of coal was reported in 1963.

== See also ==
- List of ghost towns in West Virginia
