= Kingston, West Virginia =

- Unincorporated community
- Location within West Virginia Location within the United States
- Coordinates: 37°58′25″N 81°18′16″W
- Country: United States
- State: West Virginia
- County: Fayette
- Elevation: 1,467 ft (447 m)
- Time zone: UTC-5 (Eastern (EST))
  - Summer (DST): UTC-4 (EDT)
- Area codes: 304 & 681
- GNIS feature ID: 1554884

Kingston is an unincorporated community and coal town in Fayette County, West Virginia, United States. Kingston is 8.5 miles (13.7 km) west of Oak Hill.

Kingston was named in 1910 by mining officials.

== See also ==
- List of ghost towns in West Virginia
