= Carlisle, West Virginia =

Unincorporated community in West Virginia, United States

- Unincorporated community
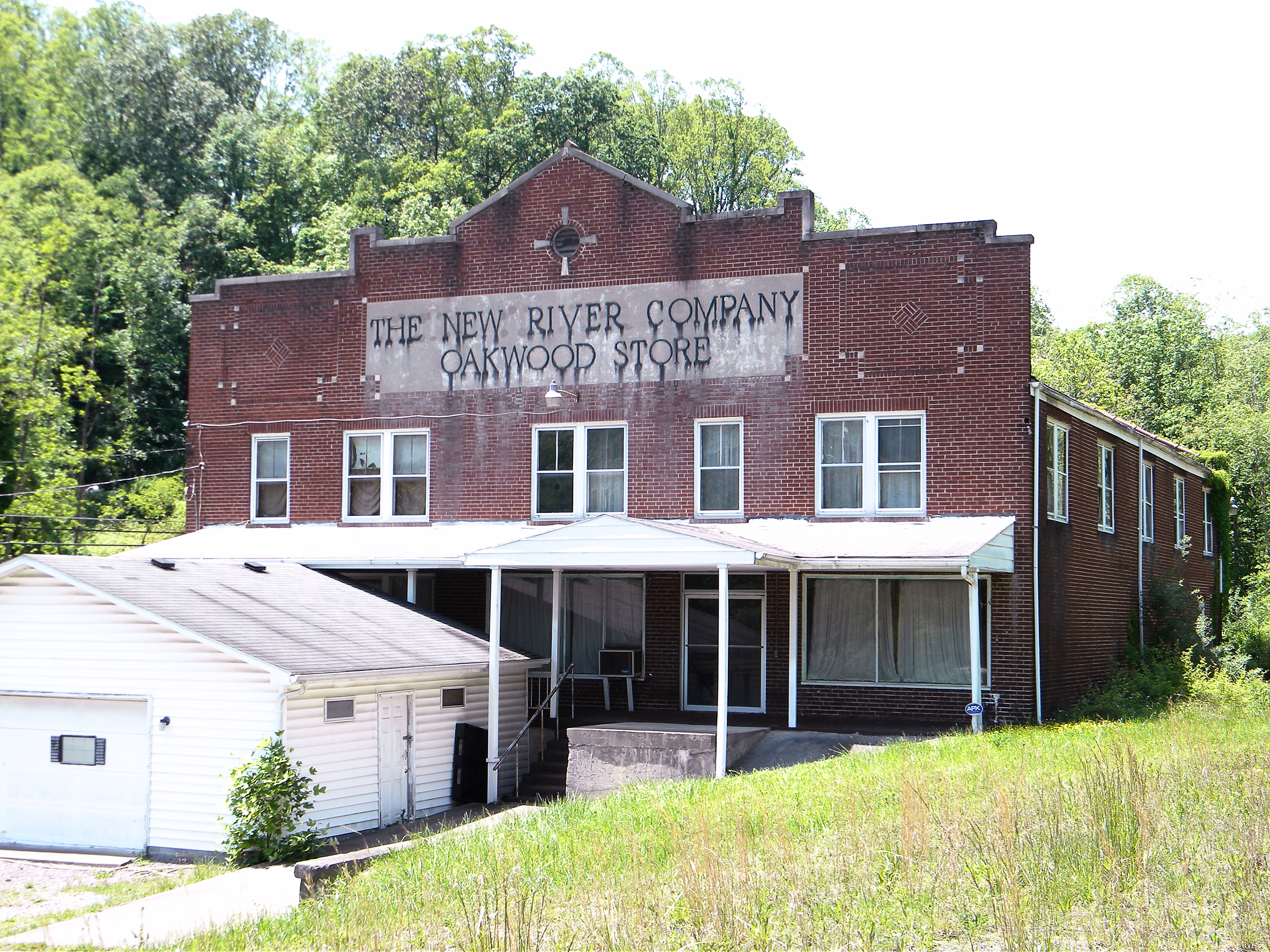
- Oakwood coal company store at Carlisle

- Location within West Virginia Location within the United States
- Coordinates: 37°57′40″N 81°10′49″W
- Country: United States
- State: West Virginia
- County: Fayette
- Elevation: 1,781 ft (543 m)
- Time zone: UTC-5 (Eastern (EST))
  - Summer (DST): UTC-4 (EDT)
- Area codes: 304 & 681
- GNIS feature ID: 1554074

Carlisle is an unincorporated community in Fayette County, West Virginia, United States. Carlisle is located on West Virginia Route 612, 2 miles (3.2 km) southwest of Oak Hill.

The community takes its name after Carlisle, England, the ancestral home of an early settler.

== See also ==
- List of ghost towns in West Virginia
