= Sun, West Virginia =

- Unincorporated community
- Location within West Virginia Location within the United States
- Coordinates: 37°55′9″N 81°10′11″W
- Country: United States
- State: West Virginia
- County: Fayette
- Elevation: 1,690 ft (520 m)
- Time zone: UTC-5 (Eastern (EST))
  - Summer (DST): UTC-4 (EDT)
- GNIS ID: 1555748

Sun is an unincorporated community and coal town in Fayette County, West Virginia, United States.

Likely founded in the 1890s, Sun was home to several coal mines, which, by 1920, had employed 380 people and produced 208,442 tons of coal.

== See also ==
- List of ghost towns in West Virginia
