= Concho, West Virginia =

Unincorporated community in West Virginia, United States

- Unincorporated community
- Location within West Virginia Location within the United States
- Coordinates: 37°58′1″N 81°5′16″W
- Country: United States
- State: West Virginia
- County: Fayette
- Elevation: 1,686 ft (514 m)
- Time zone: UTC-5 (Eastern (EST))
  - Summer (DST): UTC-4 (EDT)
- GNIS ID: 1554181

Concho is an unincorporated community and coal town in Fayette County, West Virginia, United States. It used to be known as Thurmond Mountain. The name Concho is derived from the Concho River, in Texas.

== See also ==
- List of ghost towns in West Virginia
