= Stone Cliff, West Virginia =

- Unincorporated community
- Location within West Virginia Location within the United States
- Coordinates: 37°56′12″N 81°3′44″W
- Country: United States
- State: West Virginia
- County: Fayette
- Elevation: 1,073 ft (327 m)
- Time zone: UTC-5 (Eastern (EST))
  - Summer (DST): UTC-4 (EDT)
- GNIS ID: 1547452

Stone Cliff or Stonecliff is an unincorporated community and coal town in Fayette County, West Virginia, United States. In the 20th century, prior to the Brown vs. Board of Education ruling, Black children who lived in Stone Cliff were assigned to the segregated elementary school at Claremont, Virginia.
