= MacDonald, West Virginia =

- Unincorporated community
- Location within West Virginia Location within the United States
- Coordinates: 37°53′21″N 81°9′39″W
- Country: United States
- State: West Virginia
- County: Fayette
- Incorporated: 1904
- Elevation: 1,781 ft (543 m)
- Time zone: UTC-5 (Eastern (EST))
  - Summer (DST): UTC-4 (EDT)
- GNIS ID: 1542662

MacDonald is an unincorporated community and coal town in Fayette County, West Virginia, United States.

== History ==
The community was named after Symington McDonald, a mining official. MacDonald was incorporated in 1904.
