= Rush Run (New River tributary) =

Stream in West Virginia, U.S.

Coordinates: 37°58′03″N 81°04′34″W

Rush Run is a stream in the U.S. state of West Virginia. It is a tributary of the New River.

Rushing water during floods accounts for the name, according to local history.

== See also ==
- List of rivers of West Virginia
