= Thurmond, West Virginia =

- Incorporated
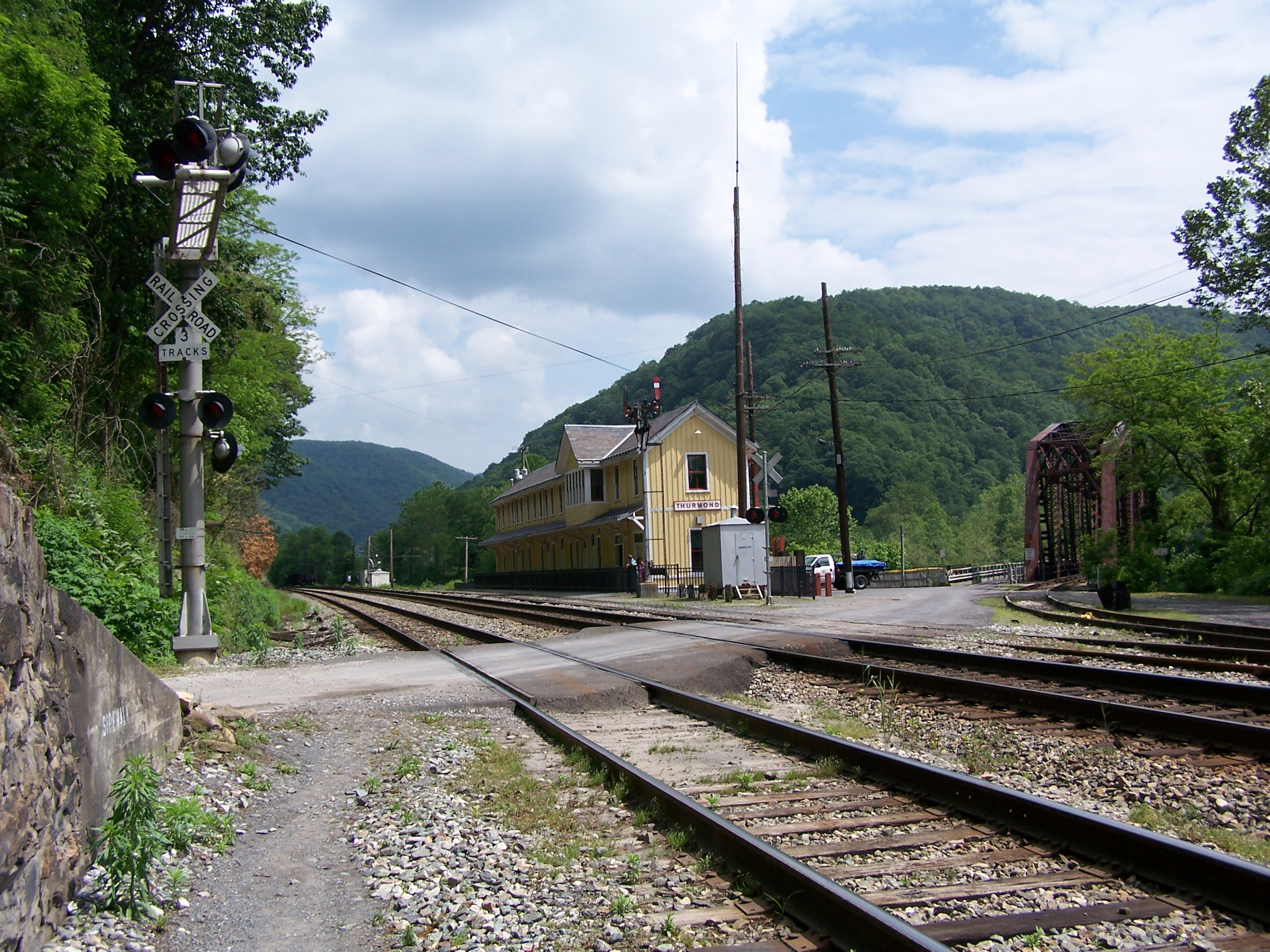
- Thurmond Depot, now a New River Gorge National Park and Preserve visitor center, and a single track bridge which crosses the New River.

- Location of Thurmond in Fayette County, West Virginia.
- Coordinates: 37°57′40″N 81°4′54″W
- Country: United States
- State: West Virginia
- County: Fayette
- Incorporated: 1903

Government
  - Mayor: Melanie Dragan
  - Recorder: Chad McCune

Area
  - Total: 0.093 sq mi (0.24 km^{2})
  - Land: 0.093 sq mi (0.24 km^{2})
  - Water: 0 sq mi (0.00 km^{2})
- Elevation: 1,070 ft (326 m)

Population (2020)
  - Total: 5
  - Density: 42.4/sq mi (16.38/km^{2})
- Time zone: UTC-5 (Eastern (EST))
  - Summer (DST): UTC-4 (EDT)
- ZIP code: 25936
- Area codes: 304/681
- FIPS code: 54-80284
- GNIS feature ID: 1555811
- Website: thurmondwv.org
- Thurmond Historic District
- U.S. National Register of Historic Places
- U.S. Historic district
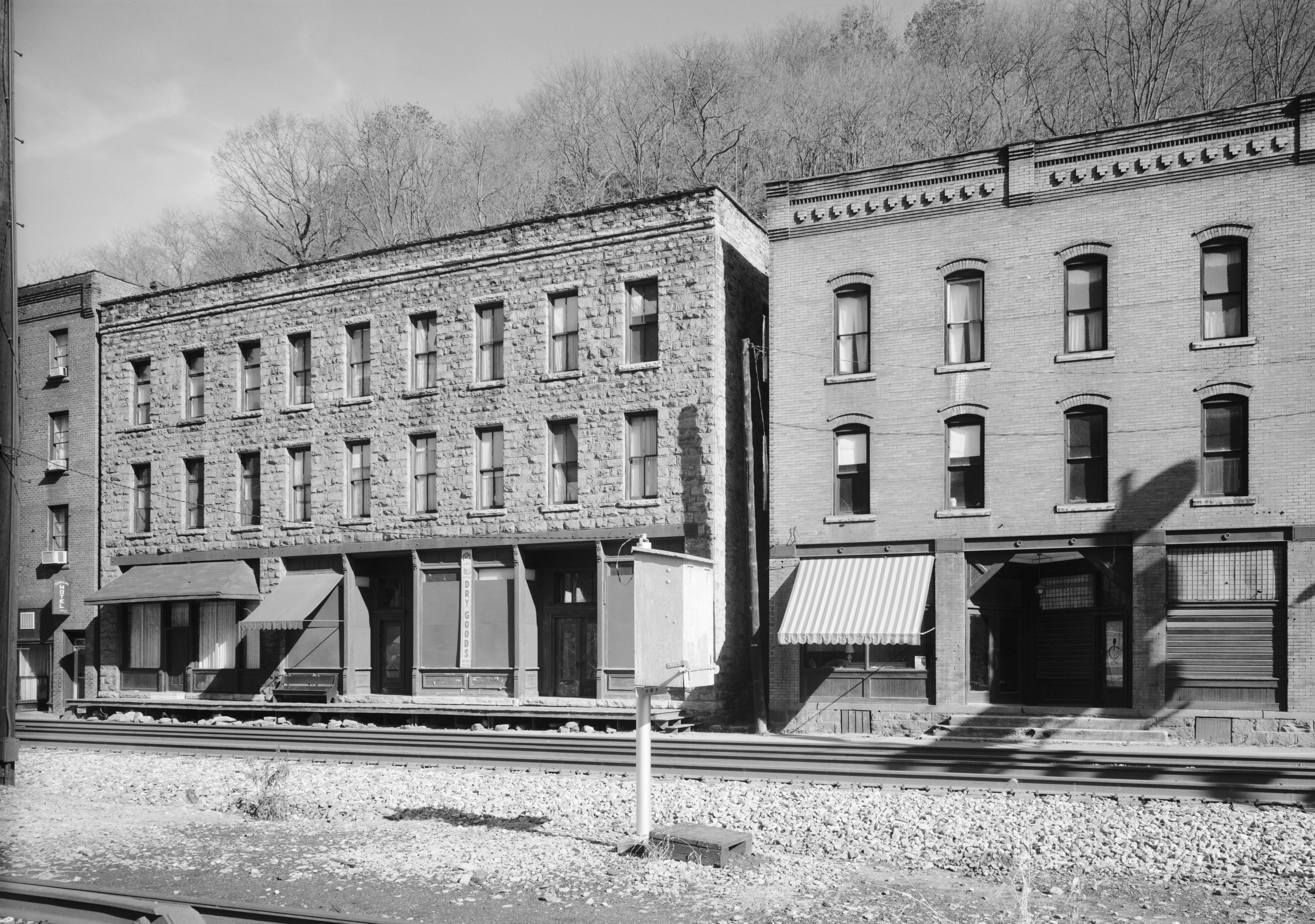
- Commercial district along "Main Street" tracks

- Location within West Virginia Location within the United States
- Location: CR 25/2 at New River, Thurmond, West Virginia
- Built: 1884
- Architect: Thurmond, W. D.
- NRHP reference No.: 84003520
- Added to NRHP: January 27, 1984

Thurmond is a town in Fayette County, West Virginia, United States, on the New River. The population was recorded as 5 in the 2020 census. During the heyday of coal mining in the New River Gorge, Thurmond was a prosperous town with a number of businesses and facilities for the Chesapeake and Ohio Railway.

Most of Thurmond is owned by the National Park Service for the New River Gorge National Park and Preserve. The C&O passenger railway depot in town was renovated in 1995 and now functions as a Park Service visitor center. The entire town is a designated historic district on the National Register of Historic Places.

Thurmond is the least-populous municipality in West Virginia. During the city elections on June 14, 2005, six of the city's seven residents sought elected office.

== History ==
Thurmond was incorporated in 1903 and was named for Captain W. D. Thurmond, who settled here in 1844. He received the 73-acre site in 1873 as payment for a surveying job. Thurmond post office was established in 1888 and discontinued in 1995. The community remained small until Thomas G McKell of Glen Jean negotiated with the Chesapeake and Ohio Railway for a crossing at Dunloup Creek in 1892.

W. D. Thurmond banned alcohol from his lands, which comprised the originally incorporated portion of the town. The Dun Glen Hotel was just outside the incorporated portion. A district called "Ballyhack" or "Balahack" on the south side near the Dun Glen became notorious as Thurmond's red light district.

Two hotels were in the town; one was called the Lafayette (known locally as the "Lay-flat"), which was close to the railroad, and the 100-room Dun Glen, which opened in 1901, became a nationally known resort. It burned down in 1930. The Thurmond National Bank (owned by Thurmond) closed in 1931, and the New River Bank (owned by the McKells) moved to Oak Hill in 1935. The decline continued into the 1950s when locomotives changed from steam to diesel, which could travel much longer distances and did not need to stop for coal and water refilling at Thurmond. The second decline to hit Thurmond was in the late 1980s, when the National Park Service began purchasing homes and properties, voluntarily, with the promise of turning the Town into a living history museum.

== Historic district ==
The Thurmond Historic District comprises the entire town and a small portion of the opposite riverbank. Thurmond was accessible solely by rail until 1921. The town occupies a narrow stretch of flat land along the Chesapeake and Ohio Railway track, with no road between the tracks and the town. Instead, a single-lane road crosses the New River on a single-track railroad bridge, crosses the main line, and climbs the hill behind the town so that it parallels the town 150 feet higher on the hill before dropping down next to the tracks. Due to its strategic position on the rail line, the commercial center thrived despite the absence of a road.

In the residential portion of the town, housing types are standardized, with three or four basic types corresponding to different positions in the railroad hierarchy. The commercial district, while lacking a street for much of its history, boasted two hotels, two banks, and a number of other commercial buildings. The railroad station was built in 1888, while a railyard and shops served the extensive branch line network which carried coal out of the hills.

The town once had a population of several hundred, which has dwindled to fewer than a dozen. The railroad depot is now a visitor center for New River Gorge National Park and Preserve.

== Geography ==
Thurmond's level land is almost entirely consumed by CSX (formerly the Chesapeake and Ohio Railway) operations. Apart from a strip of commercial buildings that front directly onto the train tracks with no intervening street, the remainder of the town climbs the hill behind the bottomland. Thurmond was an important switching center for the C&O, a place where short trains from mines in the area were assembled into longer trains for shipment to markets on the main line.

== Demographics ==
Thurmond, West Virginia – Racial and ethnic composition Note: the US Census treats Hispanic/Latino as an ethnic category. This table excludes Latinos from the racial categories and assigns them to a separate category. Hispanics/Latinos may be of any race.
Race / Ethnicity (NH = Non-Hispanic)	Pop 2000	Pop 2010	Pop 2020	% 2000	% 2010	% 2020
White alone (NH)	7	5	3	100.00%	100.00%	60.00%
Black or African American alone (NH)	0	0	0	0.00%	0.00%	0.00%
Native American or Alaska Native alone (NH)	0	0	0	0.00%	0.00%	0.00%
Asian alone (NH)	0	0	0	0.00%	0.00%	0.00%
Native Hawaiian or Pacific Islander alone (NH)	0	0	0	0.00%	0.00%	0.00%
Other race alone (NH)	0	0	0	0.00%	0.00%	0.00%
Mixed race or Multiracial (NH)	0	0	2	0.00%	0.00%	40.00%
Hispanic or Latino (any race)	0	0	0	0.00%	0.00%	0.00%
Total	7	5	5	100.00%	100.00%	100.00%

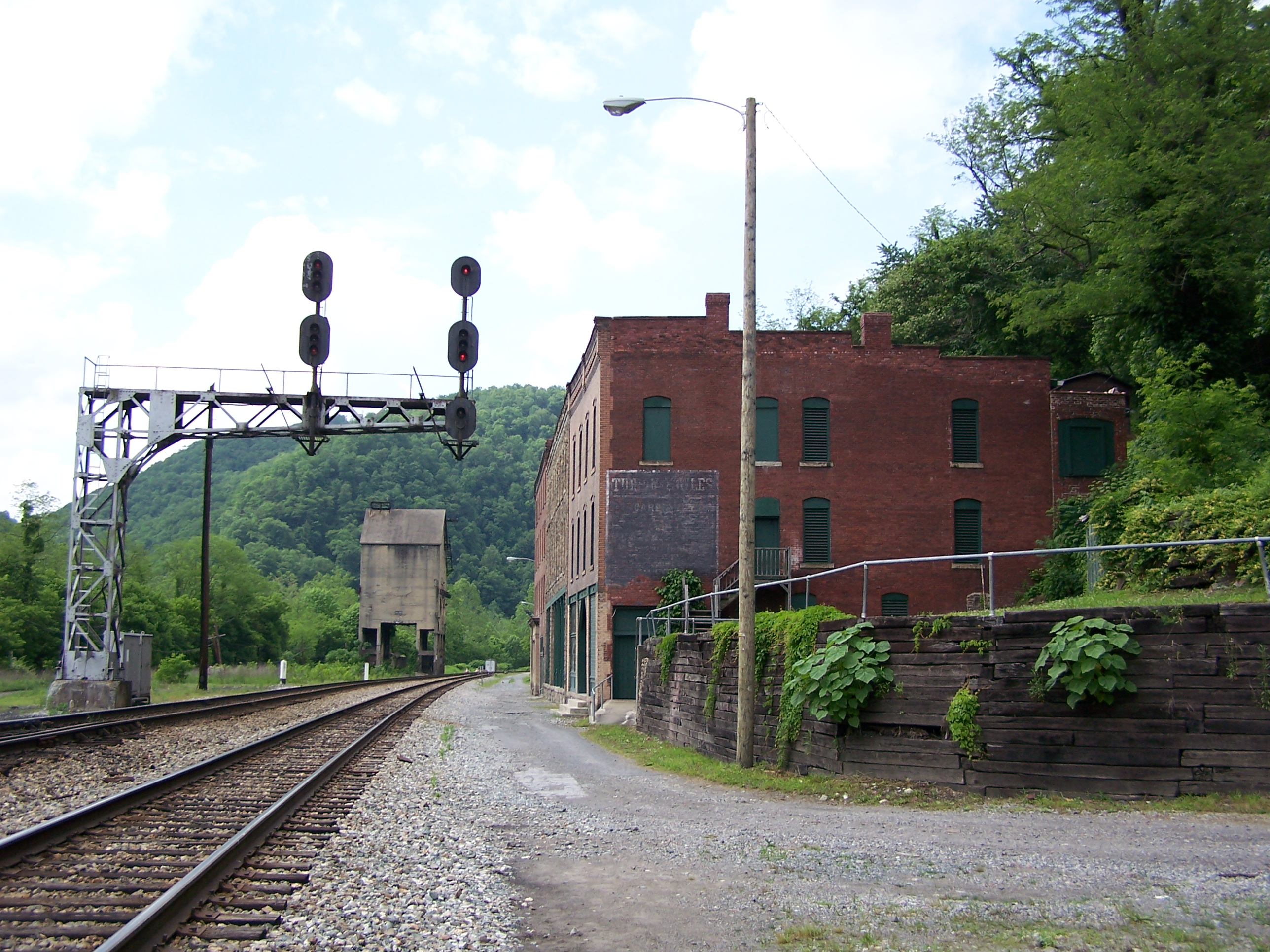
Downtown Thurmond, along the CSX New River Subdivision.

Historical population
Census	Pop.	Note	%±
1910	315		—
1920	285		−9.5%
1930	462		62.1%
1940	339		−26.6%
1950	219		−35.4%
1960	189		−13.7%
1970	86		−54.5%
1980	67		−22.1%
1990	39		−41.8%
2000	7		−82.1%
2010	5		−28.6%
2020	5		0.0%
U.S. Decennial Census

=== 2000 census ===
As of the census of 2000, seven people, five households, and one family were residing in the town. The population density was 70.5 inhabitants/sq mi (27.0/km^{2}). The seven housing units averaged 70.5/sq mi (27.0/km^{2}). The racial makeup of the town was 100.00% White.

Of the five households, none had children under 18 living with them, one was a married couple living together, and four were not families. Three households were made up of individuals, and two had someone living alone who was 65 or older. The average household size was 1.40, and the average family size was 2.00.

In the town, the age distribution was one from 18 to 24, one from 25 to 44, three from 45 to 64, and two who were 65 or older. The median age was 56 years. There were five females and two males.

The median income for a household in the town was $23,750, and for a family was $0. The per capita income for the town was $10,782. No families were living below the poverty line.

=== 2010 census ===
As of the census of 2010, there were five people, four households, and zero families residing in the town. The population density was 55.6 inhabitants per square mile (21.5/km^{2}). The 12 housing units averaged 133.3 per square mile (51.5/km^{2}). The racial makeup of the town was 100% White.

None of the four households were families. Three households were made up of individuals, and two had someone living alone who was 65 or older. The average household size was 1.25, and the average family size was 0.00.

The median age in the town was 57.5 years. None of residents were under the age of 24; 40% (two people) were from 25 to 44; 20% (one person) were from 45 to 64; and 40% (two people) were 65 or older. The gender makeup of the town was 20.0% (one) male and 80.0% (four people) female.

== Rail transportation ==
Amtrak train 51 arriving at Thurmond

Amtrak, the national passenger rail service, provides service to Thurmond on the Cardinal route. It is one of the least used stations on the Amtrak network.

In 2022, the Amtrak station in Thurmond, WV saw 399 passengers served, compared to 285 in 2018. In 2023, 466 passengers were served.

As of 2024, due to the low annual ridership in Thurmond, the station is unstaffed, there is no waiting room, and no in-person ticket booth or kiosk.

== In popular culture ==
The town was the filming location for John Sayles' 1987 movie Matewan since it still possesses many of the characteristics of a 1920s Appalachian coal town. The events took place in Matewan, West Virginia, which borders the Kentucky state line about 100 miles away.

W. D. Thurmond banned alcohol from his lands, which comprised the originally incorporated portion of the town. The McKell family, though, had no such scruples, and their Dun Glen Hotel on McKell land just to the east of the Thurmond land became notorious for hosting a 14-year-long card party claimed by Ripley's Believe It or Not to be the world's longest-lasting poker game.

== See also ==
- Kay Moor, another mining town in the New River Gorge, now abandoned
- Nuttallburg Coal Mining Complex and Town Historic District, an abandoned mining town near Kay Moor in the New River Gorge
