= Charles Ezra Beury =

Charles Ezra Beury (pronounced "Berry"; August 13, 1879 – March 9, 1953) was the second president of Temple University from 1925 to 1941.

Dr. Beury was a banker before he became a college president. A son of the coal-operating Beurys for whom Beury, W. Va., is named, Charles Ezra Beury graduated from Princeton University in 1903. When he received a law degree from Harvard three years later it was in absentia because that day he was marrying the Lutheran pastor's daughter in his native Shamokin, Pennsylvania. His stock joke: "I became a bachelor and a benedict on the same day."

A career as lawyer and banker brought him to Temple's board of trustees where Russell Conwell spotted him as a likely successor. After his election Beury tried for a while to be both president of Temple University and board chairman of Bank of Philadelphia & Trust Co. In 1930 the bank was merged with Bankers Trust Co. of Philadelphia and Beury stepped out of the chairmanship. Few months later, Bankers Trust Co. went down with a resounding crash.

With Temple, Beury fared much better. Raising $6,000,000, he built a twelve-story classroom building, a student centre, and a new plant for the school of medicine. He acquired a school of chiropody. In 1932 he signed up Glenn Scobey Warner to coach football in what was at the time a new stadium.

Temple's benefactors have included Publisher Cyrus H. K. Curtis, his son-in-law Edward Bok, and Mr. & Mrs. George F. Tyler, who gave the $1,000,000 School of Fine Arts now headed by Sculptor Boris Blai. In 1929 Thomas D. Sullivan, president of Philadelphia's Terminal Warehouse Co. and brother of Pundit Mark Sullivan, left $278,000 towards a library. In 1934, with private benefactions dried up, Beury turned to the PWA for $550,000 to complete the building.

He died on March 9, 1953, and was interred at Laurel Hill Cemetery in Philadelphia.
