= Beury, West Virginia =

Unincorporated community in West Virginia, United States

- Unincorporated community
- Location within West Virginia Location within the United States
- Coordinates: 37°57′34″N 81°2′26″W
- Country: United States
- State: West Virginia
- County: Fayette
- Elevation: 1,066 ft (325 m)
- Time zone: UTC-5 (Eastern (EST))
  - Summer (DST): UTC-4 (EDT)
- GNIS ID: 1549592

Beury is an unincorporated community and coal town in Fayette County, West Virginia, United States.

The community was founded in 1870 and has the name of Joseph L. Beury, the proprietor of a coal mine. By 1900, the town had over 500 residents, and Beury himself had a 23-room mansion. The town of Beury, however, was abandoned by 1925, and the mansion was buried under rubble after a flood in 2001.

== See also ==
- List of ghost towns in West Virginia
