= Layland, West Virginia =

- Unincorporated community
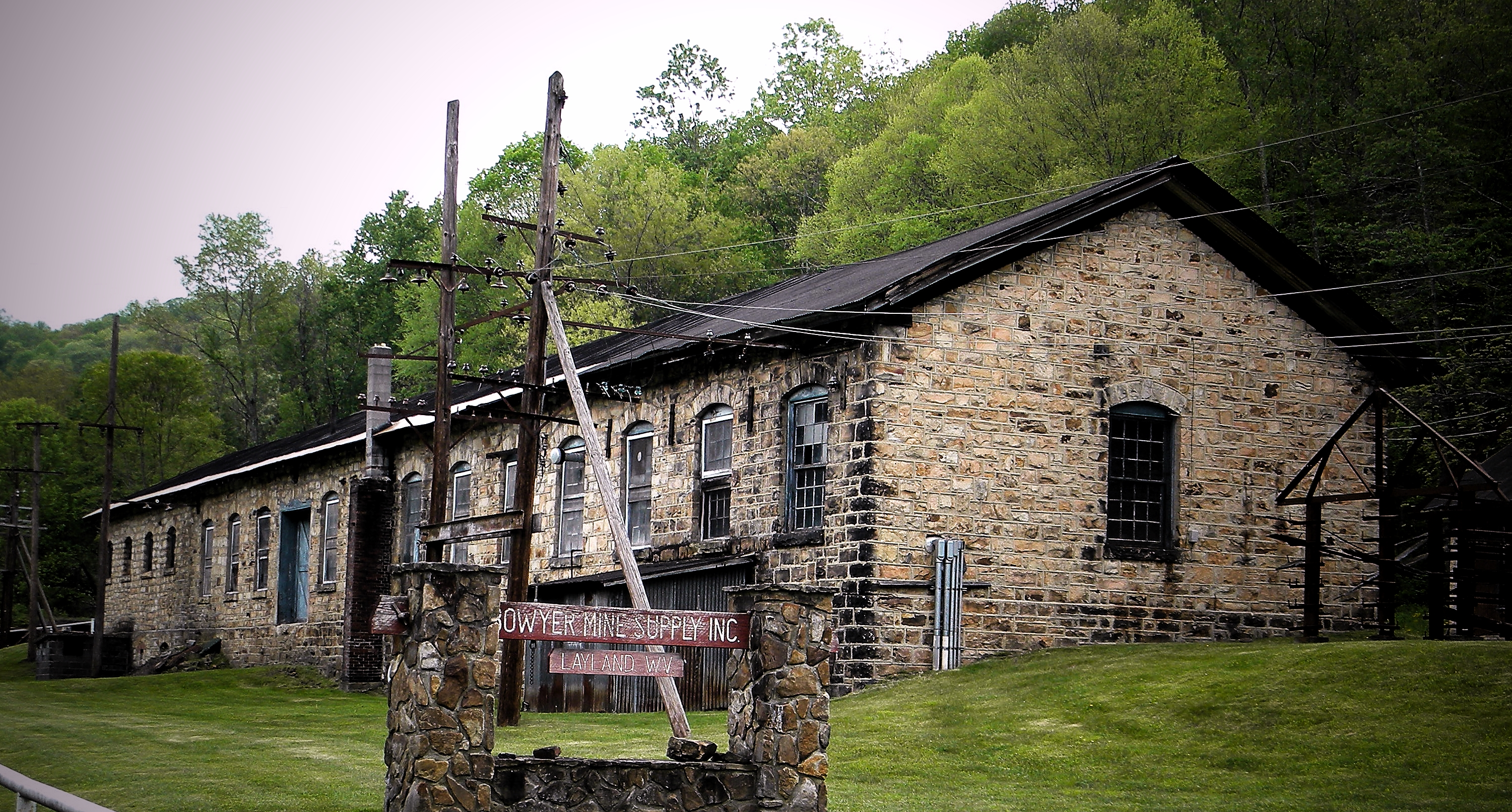
- Bowyer Mine Supply Company Layland West Virginia

- Location within West Virginia Location within the United States
- Coordinates: 37°53′21″N 80°58′16″W
- Country: United States
- State: West Virginia
- County: Fayette
- Elevation: 2,431 ft (741 m)
- Time zone: UTC-5 (Eastern (EST))
  - Summer (DST): UTC-4 (EDT)
- ZIP code: 25864
- Area codes: 304 & 681
- GNIS feature ID: 1554925

Layland is an unincorporated community in Fayette County, West Virginia, United States. Layland is located on West Virginia Route 41, 6.5 miles (10.5 km) west-northwest of Meadow Bridge. Layland has a post office with ZIP code 25864.

A former variant name was Gentry.

== Mining disaster ==
Layland was the site of a deadly mining explosion on March 2, 1915 in which 112 men were killed either by immediate impact or gas-induced suffocation. In the days following, approximately 53 survivors emerged from the mine after creating barricades to shield from the deadly gas. A memorial was established in 2014 to honor the victims and survivors.
