= Winona, West Virginia =

- Unincorporated community
- Location within West Virginia Location within the United States
- Coordinates: 38°02′47″N 80°59′32″W
- Country: United States
- State: West Virginia
- County: Fayette
- Elevation: 1,916 ft (584 m)
- Time zone: UTC-5 (Eastern (EST))
  - Summer (DST): UTC-4 (EDT)
- ZIP code: 25942
- Area codes: 304 & 681
- GNIS feature ID: 1556011

Winona is an unincorporated community in Fayette County, West Virginia, United States. Winona is 6 miles (9.7 km) east of Fayetteville. Winona has a post office with ZIP code 25942. The community has the name of Winona Gwinn, the daughter of a settler.

African-American historian Carter G. Woodson taught at a school in Winona founded by black miners for their children from 1898–1900.
