= Loop Creek (West Virginia) =

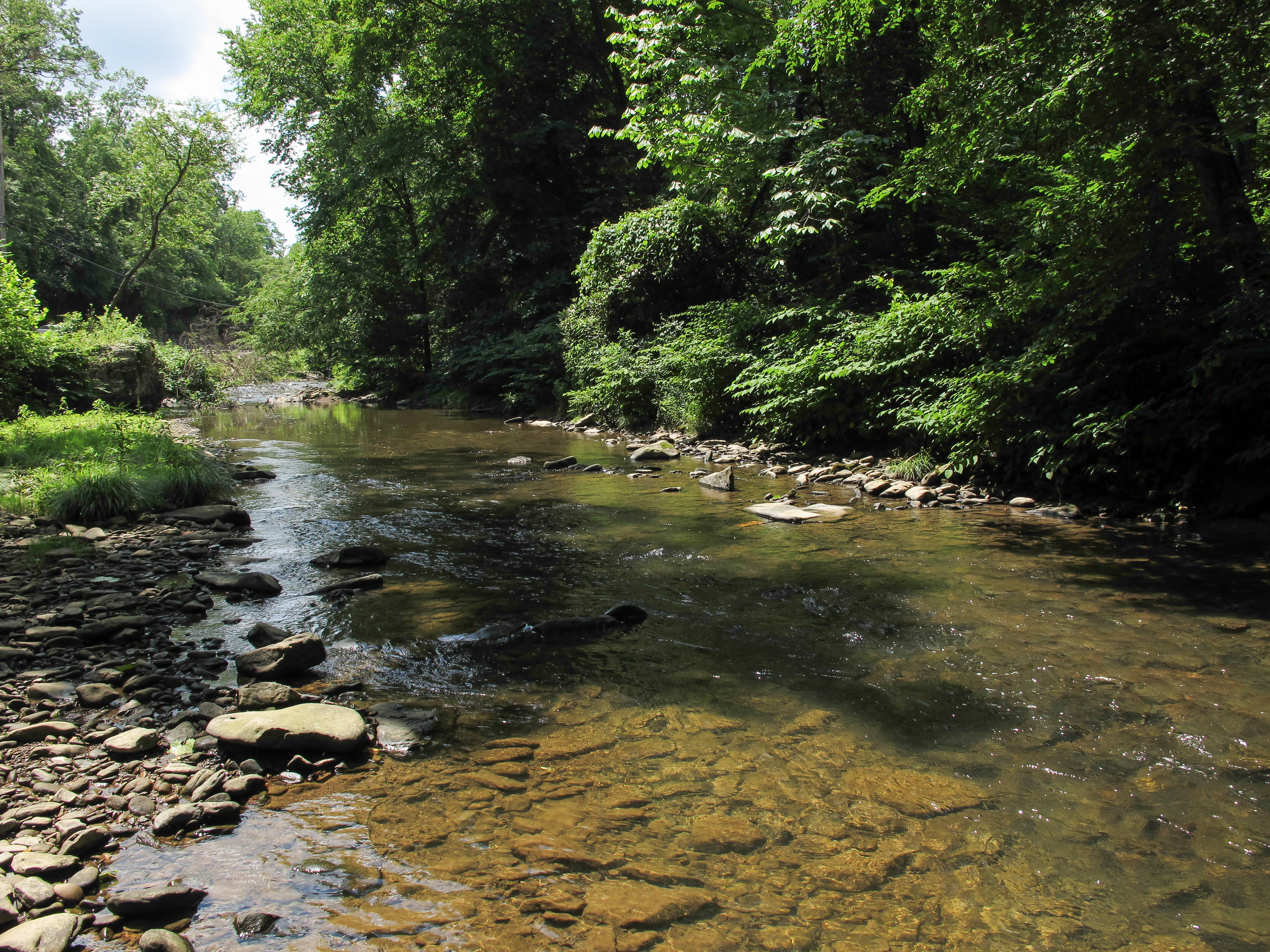
- Loop Creek near Robson

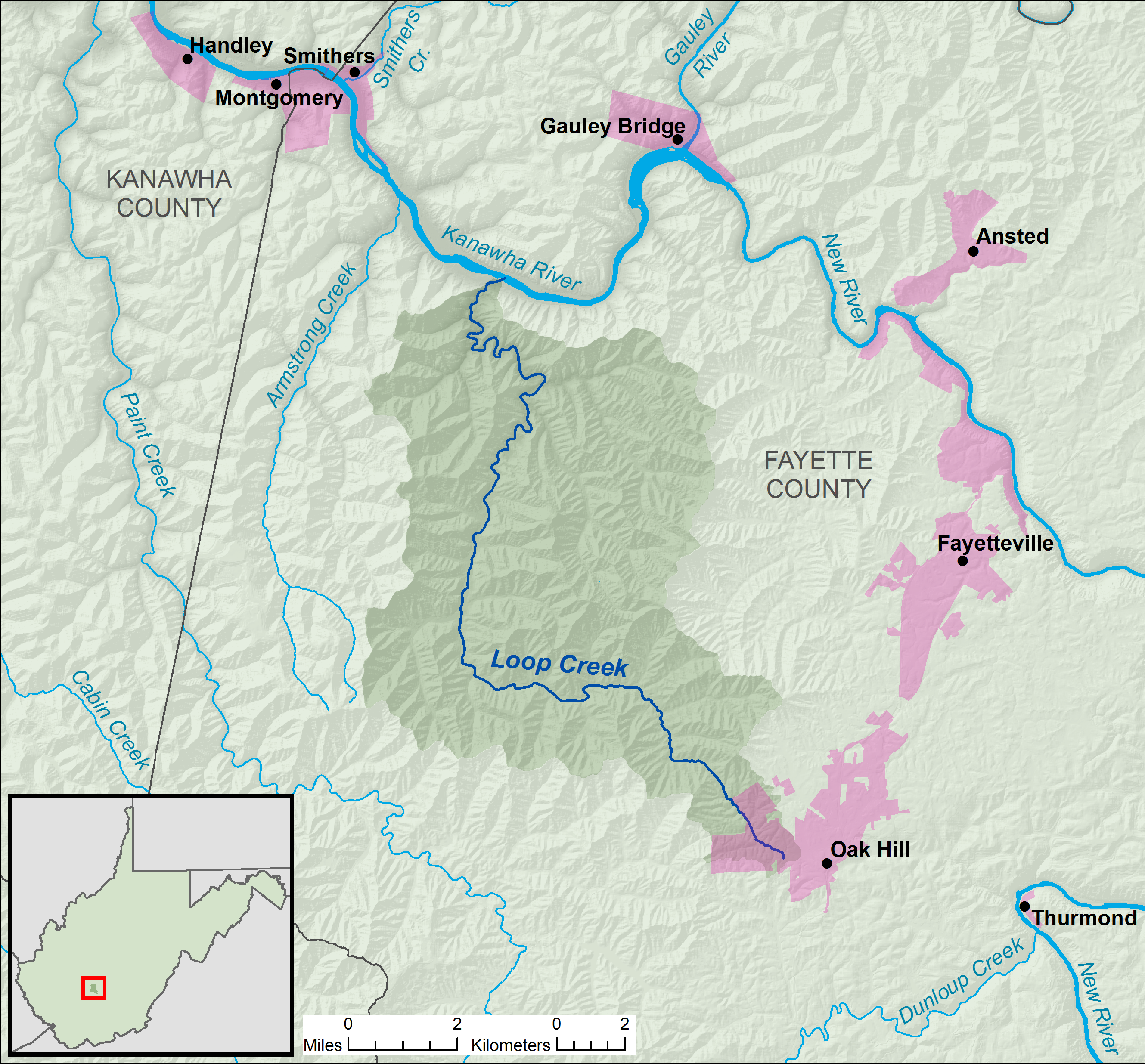
- A map of Loop Creek and its watershed

Location
- Country: United States
- State: West Virginia
- County: Fayette

Physical characteristics
- Source
  - location: Oak Hill
  - coordinates: 37.9745558°N 81.162603°W
  - elevation: 1,946 ft (593 m)
- Mouth: Kanawha River
  - location: Deep Water
  - coordinates: 38.1278852°N 81.2576092°W
  - elevation: 617 ft (188 m)
- Length: 20 mi (32 km)
- Basin size: 49.6 sq mi (128 km^{2})

Basin features
- Tributaries
  - left: Johnson Fork
- Hydrologic Unit Code: 050500060301 (USGS)

Loop Creek, also known by the spelling Loup Creek, is a tributary of the Kanawha River, 20 miles (32 km) long, in southern West Virginia in the United States. Via the Kanawha and Ohio rivers, it is part of the watershed of the Mississippi River, draining an area of 49.6 square miles (128 km^{2}) in a coal mining region on the unglaciated portion of the Allegheny Plateau.

Loop Creek flows for its entire length in western Fayette County. It rises in the city of Oak Hill and flows initially west-northwestward through the unincorporated communities of Lick Fork and Wriston, where it collects Carter Branch. Loop Creek continues through Ingram Branch and Hamilton; then northward through the unincorporated communities of Kincaid, Page, North Page, and Robson, to Deep Water, where it flows into the Kanawha River.

In addition to Loup Creek, the Geographic Names Information System lists "Loops Creek" as a historical variant name for the creek. Loop Creek was so named on account of its irregular, looping course, according to local history.

== See also ==
- List of rivers of West Virginia
- Deepwater Railway
