= Corliss (disambiguation) =

Corliss is a given name and a surname. The name Corliss is derived from Irish Gaelic, Corr Lios, meaning small round hill. It may also refer to:

- Corliss, West Virginia, an unincorporated community
- Corliss Township, Minnesota
- Corliss, County Armagh, Northern Ireland, a townland
- Corliss High School, Chicago, Illinois
- Corliss Tunnel, Pittsburgh, Pennsylvania, a road tunnel
- Corliss, County Cavan, Ireland, a townland
- Sturtevant, Wisconsin, formerly named Corliss

== See also ==
- Corliss steam engine
