= Southern Appalachian Labor School =

Non-profit organization in West Virginia

- P.O. Box 127; Kincaid, West Virginia 25119

Information
- Type: Labor school
- Established: 1977
- Publication: SALS Journal
- Website: www.sals.info

The Southern Appalachian Labor School, or SALS (pronounced like the possessive form of Sal) as it is abbreviated, is a non-profit organization that serves Fayette County, West Virginia. It was founded in 1977, initially to educate local workers and others about labor law, unions and organization. Over the years, SALS has grown to include programs for low income housing, weatherization and rehabilitation of homes, three programs for children, food assistance programs, and Youthbuild/Americorps/Americorps VISTA programs through the Corporation for National Service.

SALS hosts a number of volunteers each year, through organizations such as Christian Endeavor, Group Workcamps, Humanitarian XP and Global Volunteers. SALS hosted over 1500 volunteers in 2007.

SALS has several offices: formally at WVU Tech in Montgomery, in Kincaid, and at the SALS Community Center in Beards Fork SALS Historic Oak Hill School in Oak Hill, West Virginia.
