= Maywood =

Maywood may refer to:

Places in the United States

- Maywood, California
- Maywood, Illinois
  - Maywood station (Illinois), a commuter railroad station
- Maywood, Michigan
- Maywood, Missouri
- Maywood, New Jersey
  - Maywood Station Museum, formerly the station of Maywood
- Maywood, Nebraska
- Maywood, West Virginia
- Maywood Beach, a former water park in northern Mississippi
- Ellwood H. May Environmental Park, known as Maywood Park in Sheboygan, Wisconsin

Other

- Maywood (band)
- Maywood (Gallatin, Tennessee)
- Maywood Community School
