= Robert A. Burnside =

American judge (born 1948)

The Honorable Robert A. Burnside, Jr.

Judge of the Raleigh County Circuit Court
- In office 1988–2024
- Succeeded by: Todd Kirby

Chief Judge of the Raleigh County Circuit Court
- In office 2008–2008

Personal details
- Born: 1948 (age 77–78) Kincaid, West Virginia, U.S.
- Children: 4
- Education: Concord College, West Virginia University College of Law (JD)

Robert A. Burnside, Jr. (born 1948) is a former judge who served on the Raleigh County Circuit Court in West Virginia from 1988 to 2024. Burnside was elected to the seat in 1988 to fill an unexpired term. Burnside was born in Kincaid, West Virginia in Fayette County. He has a degree from Concord University, which he earned in 1970, and a Juris Doctor degree from West Virginia University College of Law, which he earned in 1977.

Burnside began his legal career practicing law at the law firm File Payne Scherer & Brown in Beckley, West Virginia from 1977 until 1988. He was elected to the Tenth Judicial Circuit in 1988 to fill an unexpired term. Burnside was re-elected in the primary election on May 10, 2016. Burnside was also re-elected in 1992, 2000 and 2008. Burnside served as the chief judge of the Tenth judicial district during 2008.

Burnside has four children and six grandchildren and lives in Beckley, West Virginia and Kincaid, West Virginia.

Burnside announced on September 25, 2023 that he would not seek re-election. Todd Kirby succeeded him on July 23, 2024.

Legal offices	Judge of the 10th Circuit Court of West Virginia; 1988–2024
