= Boonesborough =

Boonesborough, Boonesboro or Boonsboro is the name of the following places in the United States:

- Boonesboro, Iowa, now part of Boone, Iowa
- Boonesborough, Kentucky, an unincorporated community
- Boonsboro, Maryland, a town
- Boonesboro, Missouri, an unincorporated community
- Boonesborough, Missouri, a former town
- Boonesborough, West Virginia, an unincorporated community
