= Armstrong Creek (West Virginia) =

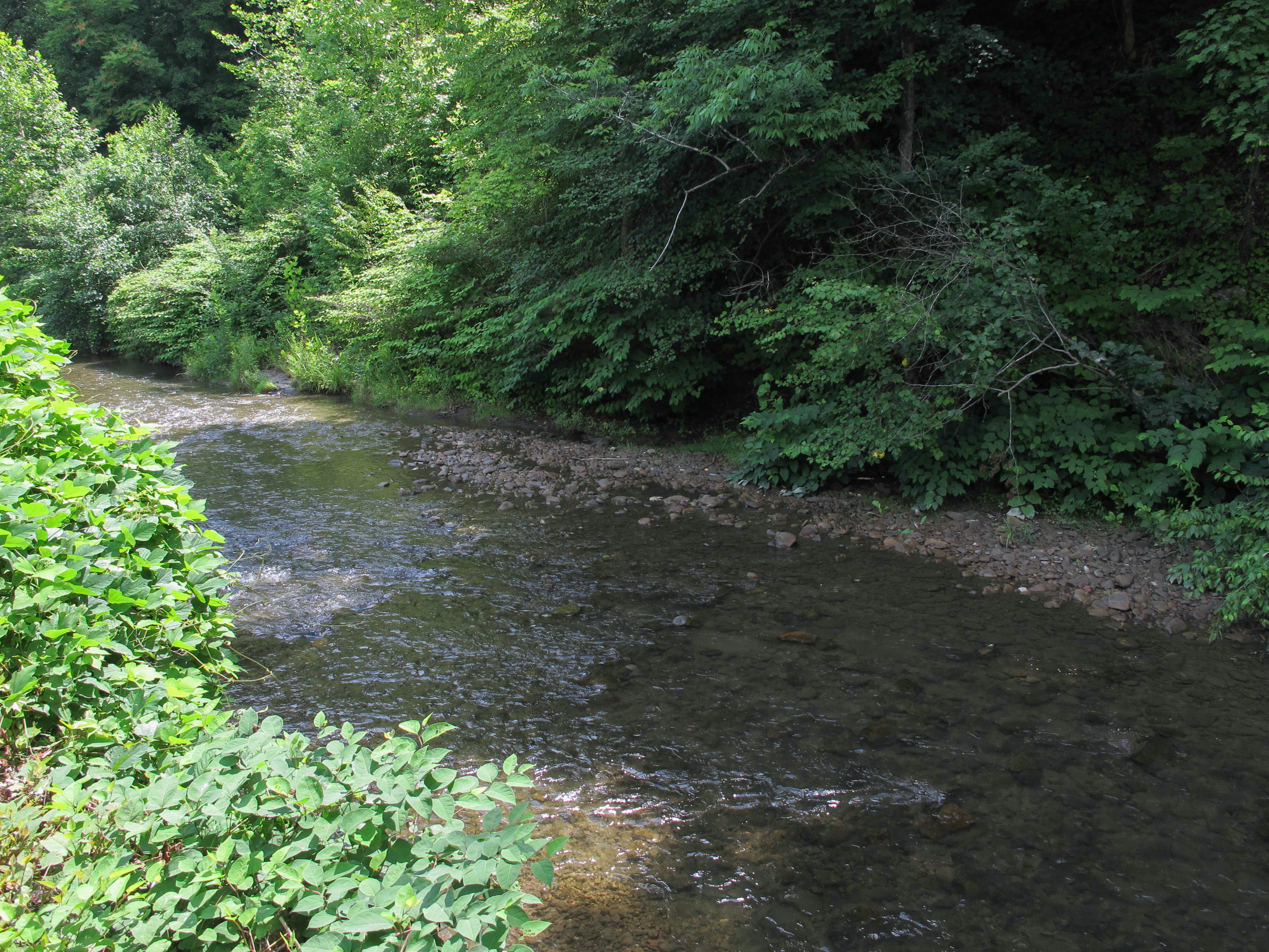
- Armstrong Creek in Kimberly

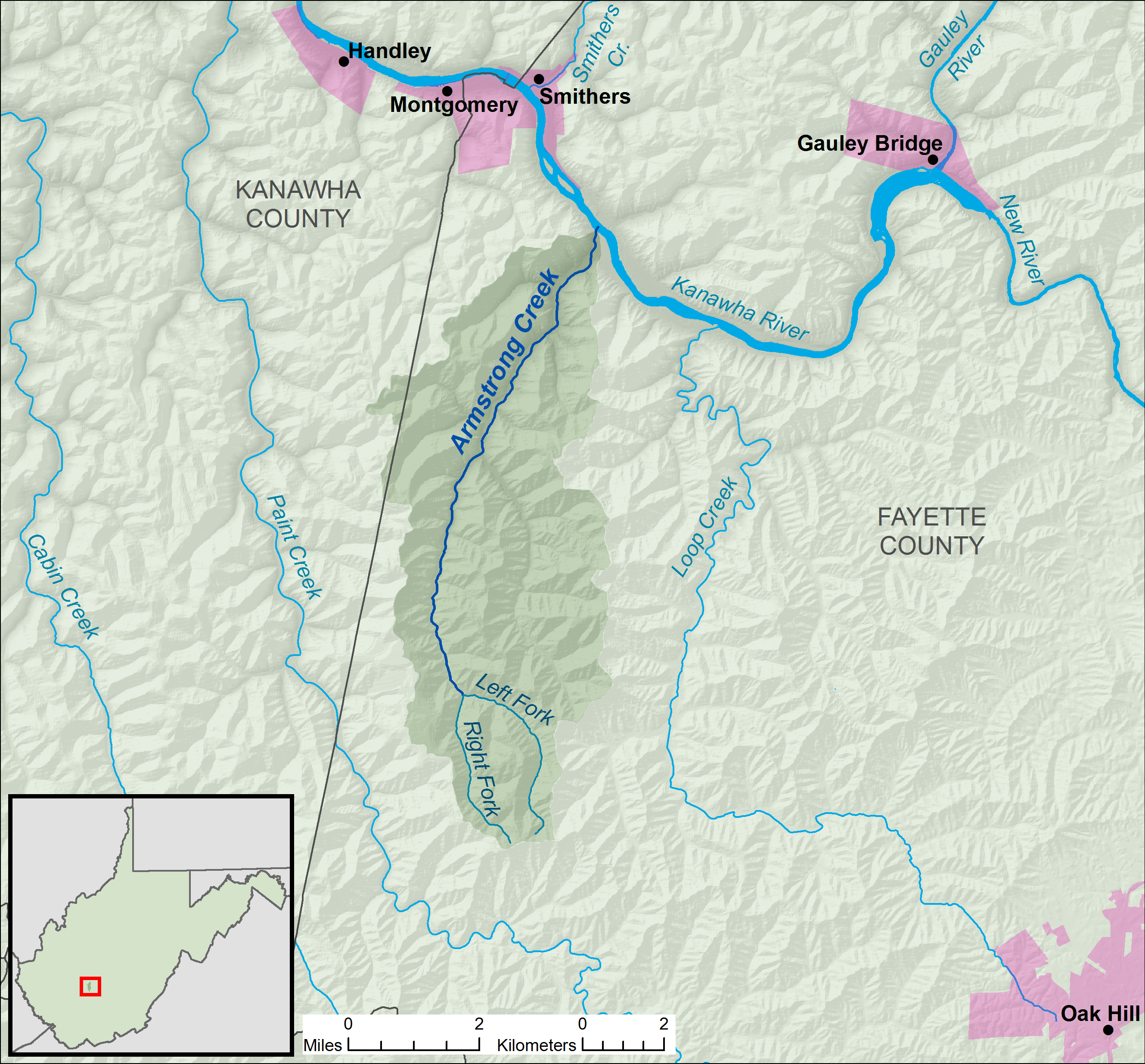
- A map of Armstrong Creek and its watershed

Location
- Country: United States
- State: West Virginia
- County: Fayette

Physical characteristics
- Source: Left Fork Armstrong Creek
  - location: north-northeast of Westerly
  - coordinates: 38.015°N 81.3097222°W
  - length: 2.9 miles (4.7 km)
  - elevation: 2,655 ft (809 m)
- 2nd source: Right Fork Armstrong Creek
  - location: north-northeast of Westerly
  - coordinates: 38.0125°N 81.3152778°W
  - length: 2.5 miles (4.0 km)
  - elevation: 2,665 ft (812 m)
- Source confluence
  - location: southwest of McDunn
  - coordinates: 38.04586°N 81.3284°W
  - elevation: 1,301 ft (397 m)
- Mouth: Kanawha River
  - location: Mount Carbon
  - coordinates: 38.1489955°N 81.2920548°W
  - elevation: 627 ft (191 m)
- Length: 8.6 mi (13.8 km)
- Basin size: 22.8 sq mi (59 km^{2})

Basin features
- Hydrologic Unit Code: 050500060302 (USGS)

Armstrong Creek is a tributary of the Kanawha River, 8.6 miles (13.8 km) long, in southern West Virginia in the United States. Via the Kanawha and Ohio rivers, it is part of the watershed of the Mississippi River, draining an area of 22.8 square miles (59 km^{2}) on the unglaciated portion of the Allegheny Plateau. The creek flows for its entire length in western Fayette County; its tributaries additionally drain a small portion of eastern Kanawha County.

Armstrong Creek is formed approximately 1.3 miles (2.1 km) southwest of the unincorporated community of McDunn by the confluence of the Left Fork Armstrong Creek, 2.9 miles (4.7 km) long, which rises approximately 1.7 miles (2.7 km) north-northeast of the unincorporated community of Westerly; and the Right Fork Armstrong Creek, 2.5 miles (4.0 km) long, which rises approximately 1.4 miles (2.3 km) north-northeast of Westerly. Both headwaters forks flow generally north-northwestward, and from their confluence Armstrong Creek flows generally north-northeastward through the unincorporated communities of Elkridge, Powellton, Columbia, and Kimberly, to Mount Carbon, where it flows into the Kanawha River. The creek is paralleled by county roads for most of its course.

The Geographic Names Information System lists "Armstrong's Creek" as a historical variant name for the creek.

== See also ==
- List of rivers of West Virginia
