= Hilton Village (disambiguation) =

Hilton Village may refer to:

- Hilton Village, a planned neighborhood in Newport News, Virginia
- Hilton Village, Virginia, an unincorporated community in Pulaski County
- Hilton Village, West Virginia, an unincorporated community in Fayette County

== See also ==
- Hilton Hawaiian Village
- Hilton (disambiguation)
