= Carter Branch =

Stream in West Virginia, United States

Coordinates: 38°01′11″N 81°12′40″W

Carter Branch is a stream in Wriston, Fayette County in the U.S. state of West Virginia. It joins Taylor Branch and flows into Loop Creek.

Carter Branch has the name of William Carter, an early settler.

== See also ==
- List of rivers of West Virginia
