= Danese =

Danese may refer to:

- Danese, West Virginia
- Danese Cattaneo (1509–1572), Italian sculptor and medallist
- Danese Cooper (born 1959), American programmer and computer scientist and advocate of open source software
- Fabrizio Danese (born 1995), Italian footballer
- Michele Danese (born 1982), Italian motorcycle racer
- Shera Danese (born 1949), American actress
- Danese Milano, an Italian brand founded in the 1950s that manufactures designer homewares (now a subsidiary of Artemede)
