= Hilltop, West Virginia =

- Census-designated place (CDP)
- Location within West Virginia Location within the United States
- Coordinates: 37°56′34″N 81°09′03″W
- Country: United States
- State: West Virginia
- County: Fayette

Area
  - Total: 0.654 sq mi (1.69 km^{2})
  - Land: 0.652 sq mi (1.69 km^{2})
  - Water: 0.002 sq mi (0.0052 km^{2})
- Elevation: 1,870 ft (570 m)

Population (2020)
  - Total: 528
  - Density: 810/sq mi (313/km^{2})
- Time zone: UTC-5 (Eastern (EST))
  - Summer (DST): UTC-4 (EDT)
- ZIP code: 25855
- Area codes: 304 & 681
- GNIS feature ID: 1540305

Hilltop is a census-designated place (CDP) in Fayette County, West Virginia, United States. Hilltop is located on state routes 16 and 61, 2 miles (3.2 km) south of Oak Hill. Hilltop has a post office with ZIP code 25855. As of the 2020 census, its population was 528 (down from 624 at the 2010 census). Hilltop was formerly an incorporated municipality.
