= Beards Fork, West Virginia =

- Census-designated place (CDP)
- Location of Beards Fork in West Virginia Beards Fork (the United States)
- Coordinates: 38°03′49″N 81°13′38″W
- Country: United States
- State: West Virginia
- County: Fayette

Area
  - Total: 1.684 sq mi (4.36 km^{2})
  - Land: 1.682 sq mi (4.36 km^{2})
  - Water: 0.002 sq mi (0.0052 km^{2})
- Elevation: 1,253 ft (382 m)

Population (2020)
  - Total: 127
  - Density: 75.5/sq mi (29.2/km^{2})
- Time zone: UTC-5 (Eastern (EST))
  - Summer (DST): UTC-4 (EDT)
- ZIP code: 25014
- Area code: 304
- FIPS code: 54-54109
- GNIS feature ID: 1553820

Beards Fork is a census-designated place (CDP) and coal town in Fayette County, West Virginia, United States that was founded as a coal town. As of the 2020 census, its population was 127 (down from 199 at the 2010 census).

== Geography ==
Beards Fork is located at 38°03′49″N 81°13′38″W (38.063720, -81.227329). Its elevation is 1,253 feet (382 m).

Beards Fork is situated between two mountain ridges in central Fayette County, and is closest to the unincorporated town of Robson. The Post Office in Robson handles the mail for Beards Fork.

== History ==
The community takes its name from nearby Beards Fork creek.

== Transportation ==
Beards Fork is served by WV 61 via Beards Fork Road, a paved one-lane road maintained by the state; a creek runs parallel to the road throughout most of the inhabited portion of the valley (known locally as the 'hollow' or 'holler').

== Economy ==
The only entity of any kind to have offices in Beards Fork is the Southern Appalachian Labor School's Community Center, a non-profit organization that primarily provides housing services and children's programs to area residents.

== Demographics ==
=== 2020 census ===
Beards Fork CDP, West Virginia – Racial and Ethnic Composition (NH = Non-Hispanic) Note: the US Census treats Hispanic/Latino as an ethnic category. This table excludes Latinos from the racial categories and assigns them to a separate category. Hispanics/Latinos may be of any race.
Race / Ethnicity	Pop 2010	Pop 2020	% 2010	% 2020
White alone (NH)	116	78	58.29%	61.42%
Black or African American alone (NH)	80	41	40.20%	32.28%
Native American or Alaska Native alone (NH)	0	0	0.00%	0.00%
Asian alone (NH)	0	0	0.00%	0.00%
Pacific Islander alone (NH)	0	0	0.00%	0.00%
Some Other Race alone (NH)	0	0	0.00%	0.00%
Mixed Race/Multi-Racial (NH)	2	6	1.01%	4.72%
Hispanic or Latino (any race)	1	2	0.50%	1.57%
Total	199	127	100.00%	100.00%
