= Corless =

Corless is a surname. Notable people with the surname include:

- Catherine Corless (born 1954), Irish historian
- Colum Corless (1922–2015), Irish hurler
- Natalie Corless (born 2003), Canadian luger
- Peter Corless (born 1964), American game designer
- Roger Corless (1938–2007), American theologian

== See also ==
- Corliss
