= Russellville, West Virginia =

- Unincorporated community
- Location within West Virginia Location within the United States
- Coordinates: 38°04′35″N 80°53′32″W
- Country: United States
- State: West Virginia
- County: Fayette
- Elevation: 1,903 ft (580 m)
- Time zone: UTC-5 (Eastern (EST))
  - Summer (DST): UTC-4 (EDT)
- Area codes: 304 & 681
- GNIS feature ID: 1546192

Russellville is an unincorporated community in Fayette County, West Virginia, United States. Russellville is located along West Virginia Route 41, 14.5 miles (23.3 km) south of Summersville.

== History ==
The community derives its name from an early postmaster named Russell.
