= Wriston =

Wriston may refer to:

== People ==
- Henry Wriston
- Walter Wriston

== Other ==
- Wriston, West Virginia, an unincorporated community in Fayette County
