= Lockbridge, West Virginia =

- Unincorporated community
- Location within West Virginia Location within the United States
- Coordinates: 37°49′39″N 80°50′42″W
- Country: United States
- State: West Virginia
- County: Summers
- Elevation: 2,470 ft (750 m)
- Time zone: UTC-5 (Eastern (EST))
  - Summer (DST): UTC-4 (EDT)
- Area codes: 304 & 681
- GNIS feature ID: 1554982

Lockbridge is an unincorporated community in Summers County, West Virginia, United States, located south of Meadow Bridge.

The community derives its name from Lockridge Gwinn (a recording error by postal officials accounts for the error in spelling, which was never corrected).
