= Mount Carbon, West Virginia =

- Census-designated place (CDP)
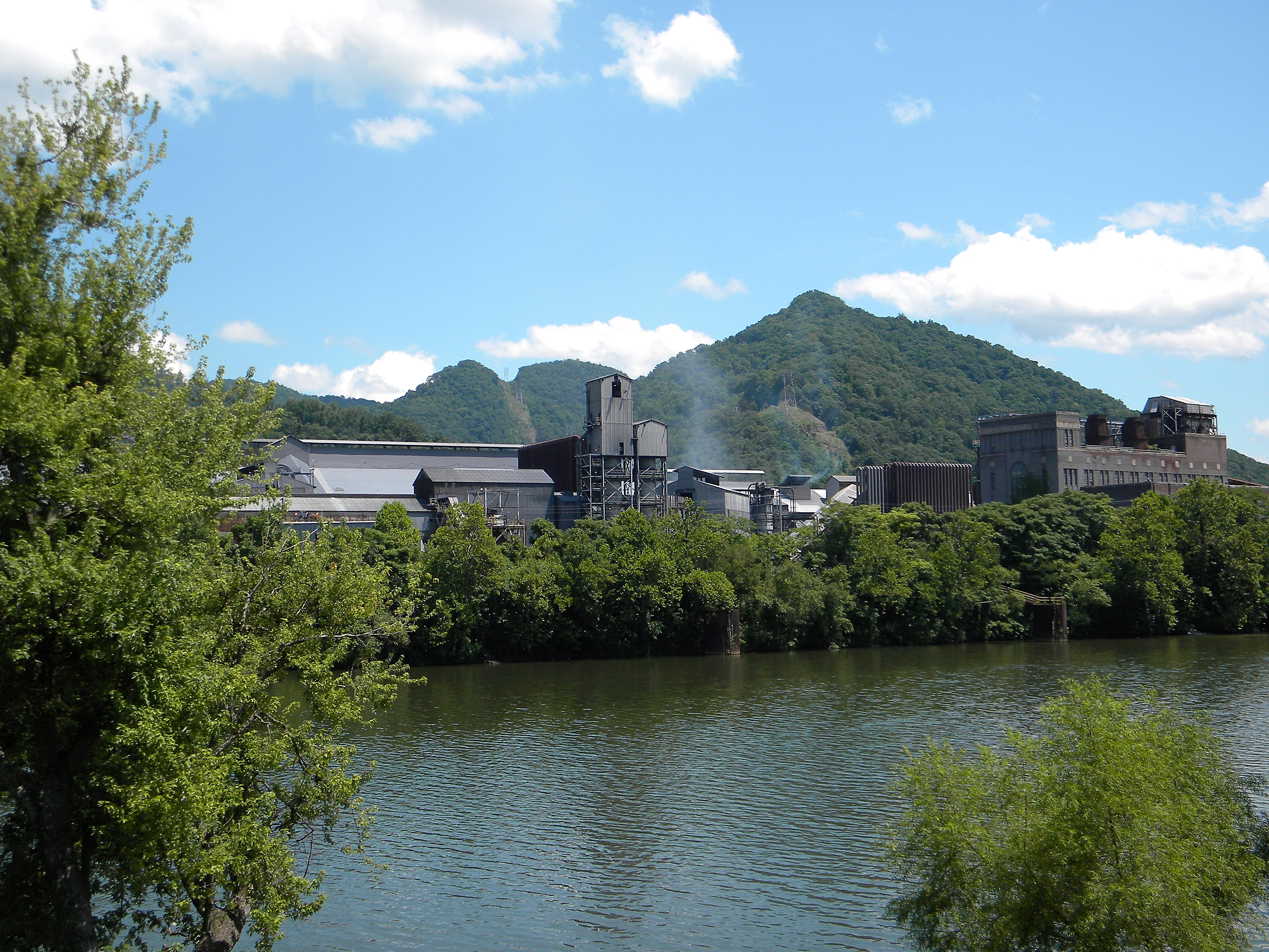
- Coal processing plant Mount Carbon WV
- Nickname: Adena
- Location within West Virginia Location within the United States
- Coordinates: 38°08′16″N 81°17′08″W
- Country: United States
- State: West Virginia
- County: Fayette

Area
  - Total: 0.241 sq mi (0.62 km^{2})
  - Land: 0.149 sq mi (0.39 km^{2})
  - Water: 0.092 sq mi (0.24 km^{2})
- Elevation: 643 ft (196 m)

Population (2020)
  - Total: 341
  - Density: 2,290/sq mi (884/km^{2})
- Time zone: UTC-5 (Eastern (EST))
  - Summer (DST): UTC-4 (EDT)
- ZIP code: 25139
- Area codes: 304 & 681
- GNIS feature ID: 1555166

Mount Carbon is a census-designated place (CDP) in Fayette County, West Virginia, United States. Mount Carbon is located along West Virginia Route 61, 3 miles (4.8 km) southeast of Montgomery, on the south bank of the Kanawha River at the mouth of Armstrong Creek. Mount Carbon has a post office with ZIP code 25139. As of the 2020 census, its population was 341 (down from 428 at the 2010 census).

== Namesake ==
Mount Carbon was named for nearby coal deposits, a carbon-based fuel.
