= Charlton Heights, West Virginia =

- Census-designated place (CDP)
- Location within West Virginia Location within the United States
- Coordinates: 38°07′25″N 81°14′02″W
- Country: United States
- State: West Virginia
- County: Fayette

Area
  - Total: 0.489 sq mi (1.27 km^{2})
  - Land: 0.414 sq mi (1.07 km^{2})
  - Water: 0.075 sq mi (0.19 km^{2})
- Elevation: 663 ft (202 m)

Population (2020)
  - Total: 307
  - Density: 742/sq mi (286/km^{2})
- Time zone: UTC-5 (Eastern (EST))
  - Summer (DST): UTC-4 (EDT)
- ZIP code: 25040
- Area codes: 304 & 681
- GNIS feature ID: 1537222

Charlton Heights is a census-designated place (CDP) in Fayette County, West Virginia, United States. Charlton Heights is located on the north bank of the Kanawha River, 4 miles (6.4 km) southwest of Gauley Bridge. Charlton Heights has a post office with ZIP code 25040. As of the 2020 census, its population was 307 (down from 406 at the 2010 census).
