= Montgomery Heights, West Virginia =

- Unincorporated community
- Location within West Virginia Location within the United States
- Coordinates: 38°07′47″N 81°16′21″W
- Country: United States
- State: West Virginia
- County: Fayette
- Elevation: 659 ft (201 m)
- Time zone: UTC-5 (Eastern (EST))
  - Summer (DST): UTC-4 (EDT)
- Area codes: 304 & 681
- GNIS feature ID: 1555155

Montgomery Heights is an unincorporated community in Fayette County, West Virginia, United States. Montgomery Heights is located on the south bank of the Kanawha River, 4.5 miles (7.2 km) southeast of Montgomery.
