= Powellton, West Virginia =

- CDP
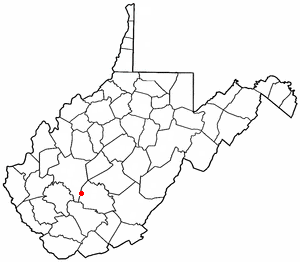
- Location of Powellton, West Virginia
- Coordinates: 38°6′27″N 81°19′15″W
- Country: United States
- State: West Virginia
- County: Fayette
- Incorporated: 1897

Area
  - Total: 5.4 sq mi (13.9 km^{2})
  - Land: 5.4 sq mi (13.9 km^{2})
  - Water: 0 sq mi (0.0 km^{2})
- Elevation: 840 ft (256 m)

Population (2020)
  - Total: 493
  - Density: 91.9/sq mi (35.5/km^{2})
- Time zone: UTC-5 (Eastern (EST))
  - Summer (DST): UTC-4 (EDT)
- ZIP code: 25161
- Area code: 304
- FIPS code: 54-65284
- GNIS feature ID: 1545222

Powellton is a census-designated place (CDP) in Fayette County, West Virginia, United States. The population was 493 at the 2020 census (down from 619 at the 2010 census).

== History ==
The community most likely was named after Godwin H. Powell, a businessperson in the coal-mining industry. Powellton was incorporated in 1897.

== Geography ==
Powellton is located at 38°6′27″N 81°19′15″W (38.107412, -81.320872).

According to the United States Census Bureau, the CDP has a total area of 5.4 square miles (13.9 km^{2}), all land. Armstrong Creek and its tributary, the Powellton Fork, flow through Powellton.

== Demographics ==
At the 2000 census there were 1,796 people, 697 households, and 515 families living in the CDP. The population density was 50.5 people per square mile (19.5/km^{2}). There were 781 housing units at an average density of 22.0/sq mi (8.5/km^{2}). The racial makeup of the CDP was 88.08% White, 9.35% African American, 0.28% Native American, 0.17% Asian, and 2.12% from two or more races. Hispanic or Latino of any race were 0.39%.

Of the 697 households 26.7% had children under the age of 18 living with them, 57.2% were married couples living together, 12.2% had a female householder with no husband present, and 26.1% were non-families. 21.8% of households were one person and 10.9% were one person aged 65 or older. The average household size was 2.58 and the average family size was 2.97.

The age distribution was 21.7% under the age of 18, 10.7% from 18 to 24, 25.7% from 25 to 44, 26.9% from 45 to 64, and 14.9% 65 or older. The median age was 40 years. For every 100 females, there were 96.7 males. For every 100 females age 18 and over, there were 90.9 males.

The median household income was $23,224 and the median family income was $30,327. Males had a median income of $27,083 versus $20,060 for females. The per capita income for the CDP was $13,646. About 19.1% of families and 21.7% of the population were below the poverty line, including 38.2% of those under age 18 and 13.7% of those age 65 or over.
