= Kimberly, Fayette County, West Virginia =

- Census-designated place (CDP)
- Location within the state of West Virginia Kimberly (the United States)
- Coordinates: 38°8′8″N 81°18′9″W
- Country: United States
- State: West Virginia
- County: Fayette

Area
  - Total: 0.890 sq mi (2.31 km^{2})
  - Land: 0.890 sq mi (2.31 km^{2})
  - Water: 0 sq mi (0 km^{2})

Population (2020)
  - Total: 213
  - Density: 239/sq mi (92.4/km^{2})
- Time zone: UTC-5 (Eastern (EST))
  - Summer (DST): UTC-4 (EDT)

Kimberly is a census-designated place (CDP) in Fayette County, West Virginia, United States. It is located along Armstrong Creek shortly before it enters the Kanawha River. As of the 2020 census, its population was 213 (down from 287 at the 2010 census). It is in zip code 25118.
