= McKendree, West Virginia =

- Unincorporated community
- Location within West Virginia Location within the United States
- Coordinates: 37°53′16″N 81°3′48″W
- Country: United States
- State: West Virginia
- County: Fayette
- Elevation: 1,181 ft (360 m)
- Time zone: UTC-5 (Eastern (EST))
  - Summer (DST): UTC-4 (EDT)
- GNIS ID: 1549813

McKendree is an unincorporated community in Fayette County, West Virginia, United States.
