= Garten, West Virginia =

- Census-designated place
- Location within West Virginia Location within the United States
- Coordinates: 38°2′4″N 81°4′36″W
- Country: United States
- State: West Virginia
- County: Fayette

Area
  - Total: 0.42 sq mi (1.09 km^{2})
  - Land: 0.42 sq mi (1.09 km^{2})
  - Water: 0 sq mi (0.0 km^{2})
- Elevation: 1,980 ft (600 m)

Population (2020)
  - Total: 204
- Time zone: UTC-5 (Eastern (EST))
  - Summer (DST): UTC-4 (EDT)
- ZIP Code: 25840 (Fayetteville)
- Area codes: 304/681
- FIPS code: 54-30148
- GNIS feature ID: 2807481

Garten is an unincorporated community and census-designated place (CDP) in Fayette County, West Virginia, United States. As of the 2020 census, it had a population of 204.

Garten is in the center of the county, 2.5 miles (4.0 km) southeast of Fayetteville, the county seat, and 9 miles (14 km) northeast of Oak Hill. It is about 1 mile (1.6 km) southwest of the west rim of the New River Gorge.
