= Sanger, West Virginia =

- Unincorporated community
- Location within West Virginia Location within the United States
- Coordinates: 37°57′23″N 81°6′46″W
- Country: United States
- State: West Virginia
- County: Fayette
- Elevation: 1,683 ft (513 m)
- Time zone: UTC-5 (Eastern (EST))
  - Summer (DST): UTC-4 (EDT)
- GNIS ID: 1555570

Sanger is an unincorporated community in Fayette County, West Virginia, United States.

The community was named after Henry Sanger, an early settler.
