= Westerly, West Virginia =

- Unincorporated community
- Location within West Virginia Location within the United States
- Coordinates: 37°59′32″N 81°19′14″W
- Country: United States
- State: West Virginia
- County: Fayette
- Elevation: 1,211 ft (369 m)
- Time zone: UTC-5 (Eastern (EST))
  - Summer (DST): UTC-4 (EDT)
- GNIS ID: 1555959

Westerly is an unincorporated community and coal town in Fayette County, West Virginia, United States. It was also known as Keeferton. It is currently a ghost town.

== See also ==
- List of ghost towns in West Virginia
- Westerly, Rhode Island, a town with the same name
