= Robson, West Virginia =

- Unincorporated community
- Nickname: SIRI
- Location within West Virginia Location within the United States
- Coordinates: 38°06′11″N 81°15′00″W
- Country: United States
- State: West Virginia
- County: Fayette
- Elevation: 876 ft (267 m)
- Time zone: UTC-5 (Eastern (EST))
  - Summer (DST): UTC-4 (EDT)
- ZIP code: 25173
- Area code: 304
- FIPS code: 54-54019
- GNIS feature ID: 1555495

Robson is an unincorporated community in Fayette County, West Virginia, United States, situated primarily on the banks of Loup Creek. Robson is served by State Highway 61, and is located 8 miles (13 km) from Montgomery and 15 miles (24 km) from Oak Hill. Robson's Post Office serves the smaller communities of Beards Fork and Mulberry.

The community was named after James Robson, an early settler.
