= Elkridge, West Virginia =

Unincorporated community in West Virginia, United States

- Unincorporated community
- Location within West Virginia Location within the United States
- Coordinates: 38°04′49″N 81°20′02″W
- Country: United States
- State: West Virginia
- County: Fayette
- Elevation: 978 ft (298 m)
- Time zone: UTC-5 (Eastern (EST))
  - Summer (DST): UTC-4 (EDT)
- Area codes: 304 & 681
- GNIS feature ID: 1538663

Elkridge is an unincorporated community in Fayette County, West Virginia, United States. Elkridge is 7 miles (11 km) south of Montgomery, along Armstrong Creek.
