= Todd Kirby =

American politician

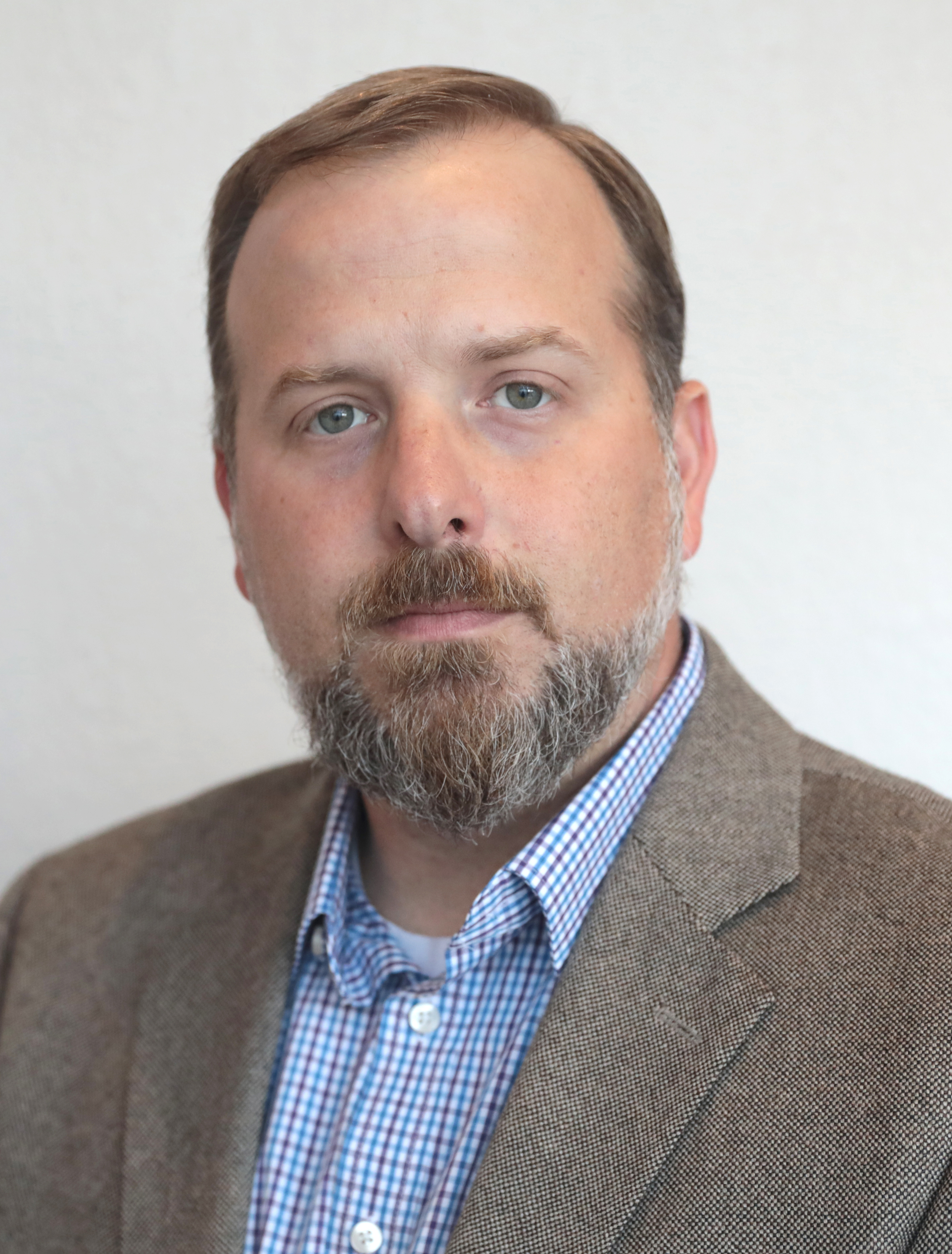

Judge of the 14th Circuit Court of West Virginia
- Incumbent
- Assumed office July 23, 2024
- Preceded by: Robert A. Burnside

Member of the West Virginia House of Representatives from the 44th district
- In office December 1, 2022 – July 2, 2024
- Preceded by: Caleb Hanna (redistricted)
- Succeeded by: Bill Roop

Personal details
- Born: Todd Andrew Kirby; 1984 (age 41–42) Beckley, West Virginia, U.S.
- Party: Republican
- Spouse: Beth Kirby
- Children: 2
- Education: Marshall University (BA); Liberty University (JD)

Todd Andrew Kirby (born 1984) is a judge of the Raleigh County Circuit Court in West Virginia. He was sworn in on July 23, 2024, beginning his term on July 24, 2024. He previously served as a member of the West Virginia House of Delegates from the 44th district.

== Biography ==
Kirby was born in Beckley, West Virginia to parents Beverly and Stephen Kirby. He graduated from Liberty High School in 2003 and Marshall University in 2007. He practiced family law and personal injury law after graduating with a JD degree from Liberty University School of Law. Kirby was elected to the West Virginia House of Delegates on November 8, 2022, and assumed office on December 1, 2022. Kirby announced in November, 2023, that he would no longer be seeking reelection to the House of Delegates, but would instead be running for Circuit Court Judge in West Virginia's 14th Circuit. He ran unopposed for the seat previously held by Judge Robert Burnside and was originally set to take office in January 2025. In July 2024, Kirby resigned from the West Virginia House after governor Jim Justice appointed him to the position for which he successfully won due to Judge Burnside’s early retirement. Kirby is married to a teacher, and they have two children together.
