= Oak Ridge, West Virginia =

- Unincorporated community
- Location within West Virginia Location within the United States
- Coordinates: 38°4′30″N 81°6′34″W
- Country: United States
- State: West Virginia
- County: Fayette
- Elevation: 1,660 ft (510 m)
- Time zone: UTC-5 (Eastern (EST))
  - Summer (DST): UTC-4 (EDT)
- GNIS ID: 1555254

Oak Ridge is an unincorporated community in Fayette County, West Virginia, United States.
