= Alloy, West Virginia =

Unincorporated community in West Virginia, United States

- Unincorporated community
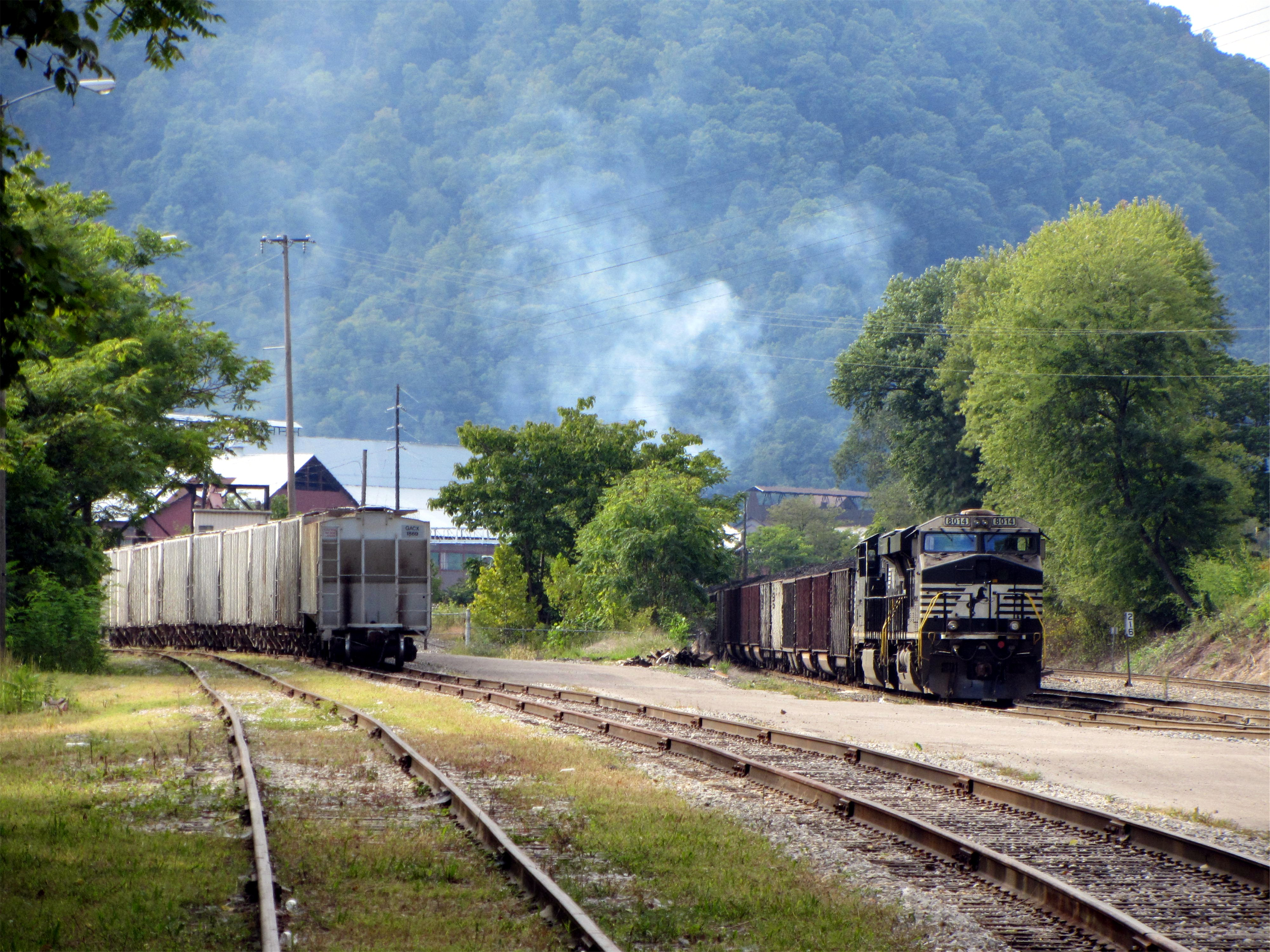
- A Norfolk Southern train in Alloy

- Location within West Virginia Location within the United States
- Coordinates: 38°08′15″N 81°16′27″W
- Country: United States
- State: West Virginia
- County: Fayette
- Elevation: 659 ft (201 m)
- Time zone: UTC-5 (Eastern (EST))
  - Summer (DST): UTC-4 (EDT)
- ZIP code: 25002
- Area codes: 304 & 681
- GNIS feature ID: 1553716

Alloy is an unincorporated community in Fayette County, West Virginia, United States. Alloy is located along the Kanawha River and U.S. Route 60, 5 miles (8.0 km) southwest of Gauley Bridge. Alloy was originally known as Boncar (anagram of carbon) until the mid-1930s. Both the original placename and the current placename refer to the ferroalloy plant that still operates here (producing about 30% of all the silicon metal in North America). The metals plant was originally the Electro Metallurgical Co.; a unit of Union Carbide and Carbon Corporation. Alloy has a post office with ZIP code 25002.

== Gallery ==
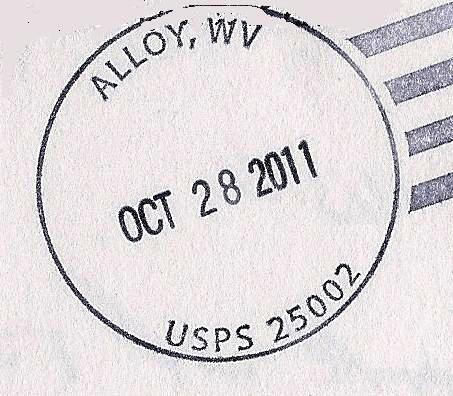
Postmark from Alloy

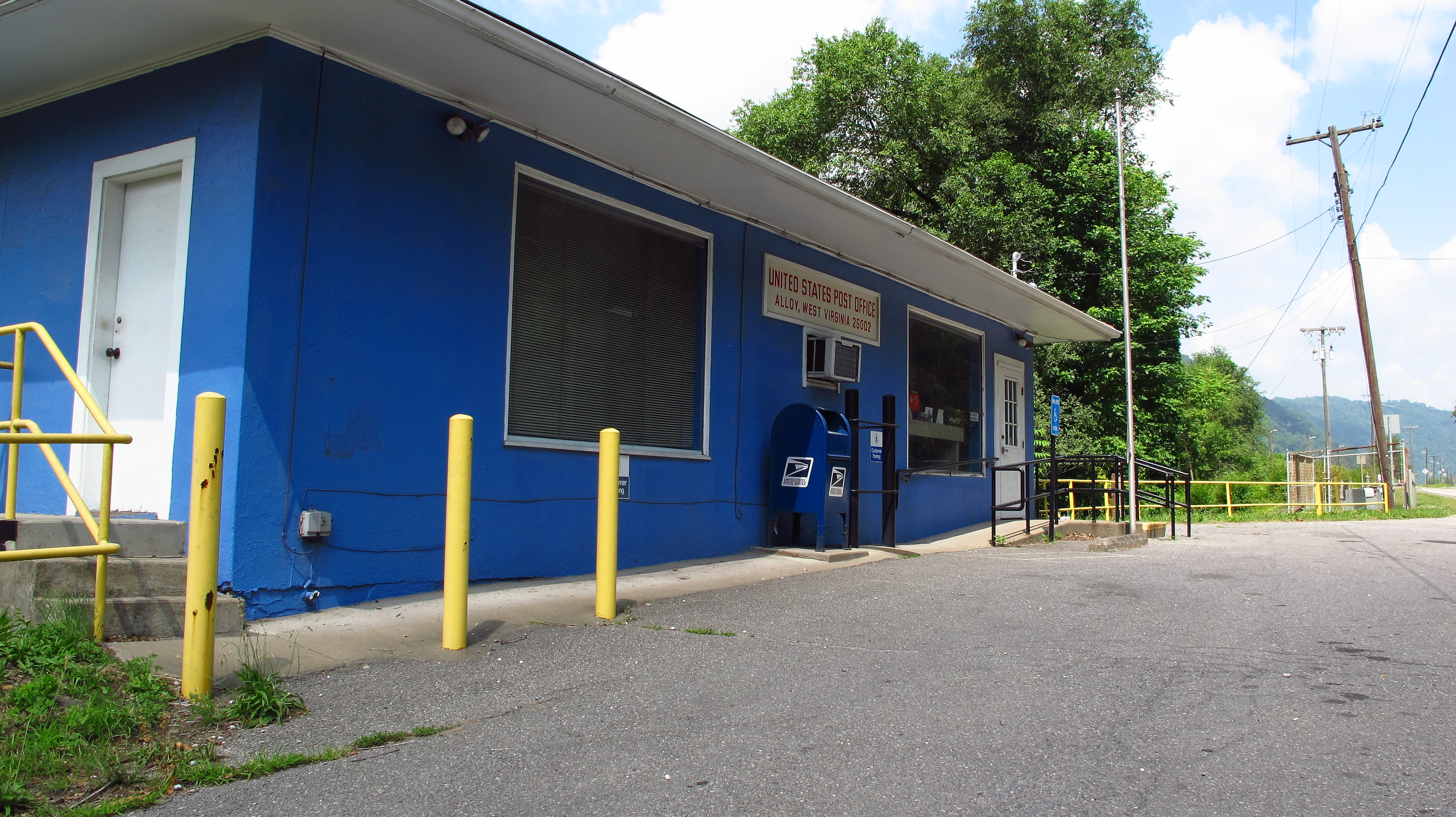
Post office

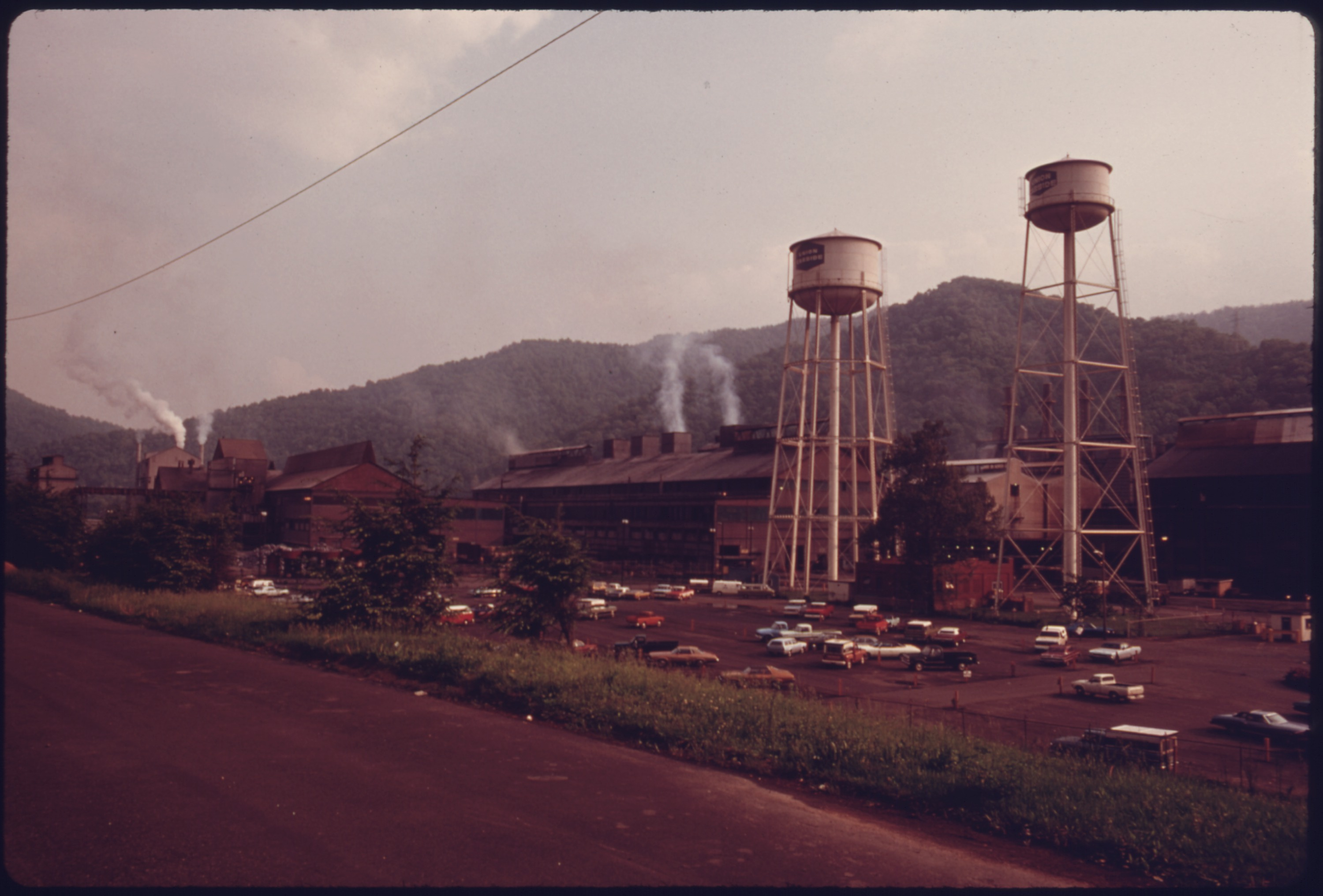
Union Carbide plant in Alloy, 1975

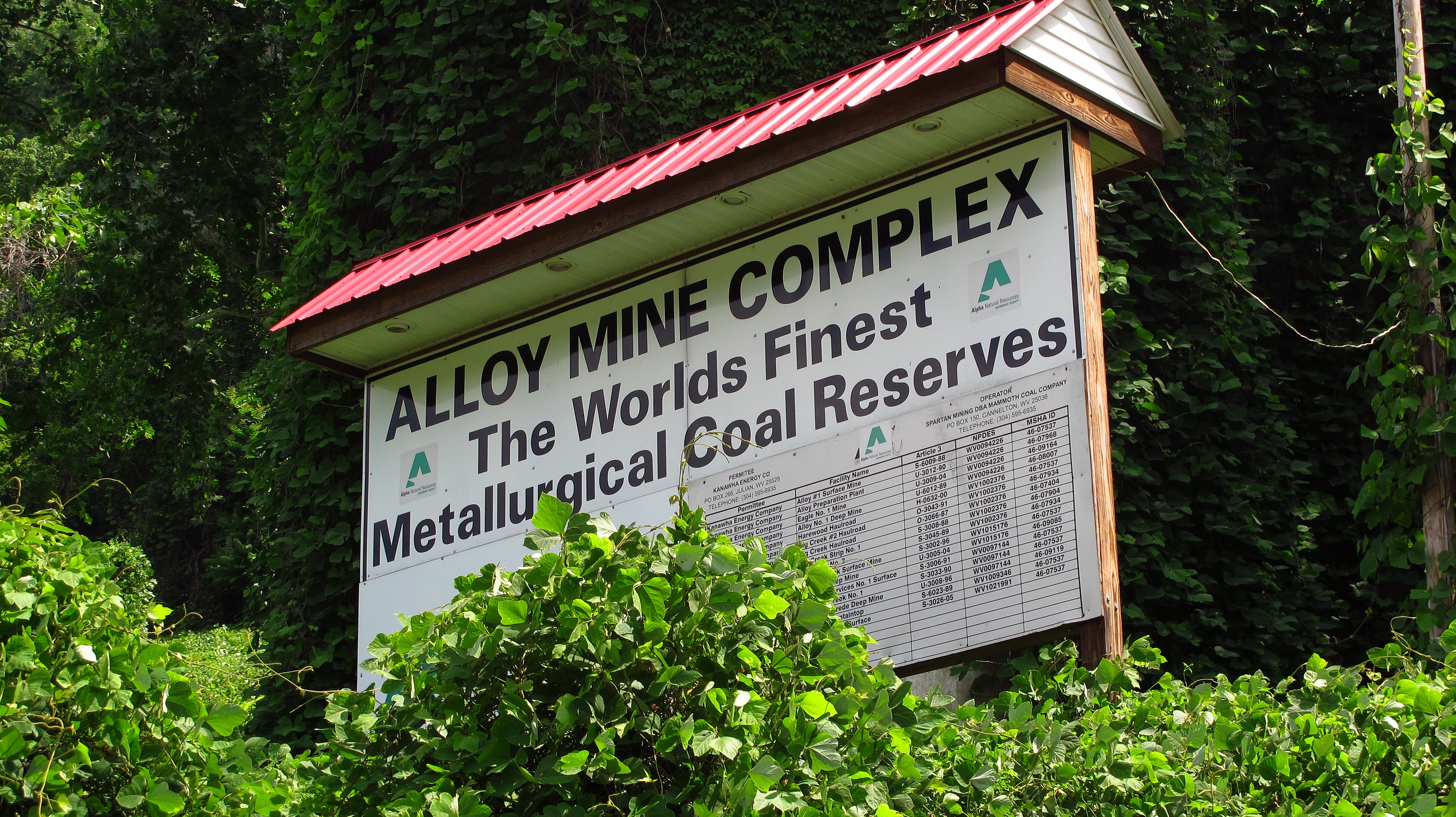
Sign at mine
