= Greenstown, West Virginia =

- Unincorporated community
- Location within West Virginia Location within the United States
- Coordinates: 37°57′39″N 81°8′50″W
- Country: United States
- State: West Virginia
- County: Fayette
- Elevation: 1,906 ft (581 m)
- Time zone: UTC-5 (Eastern (EST))
  - Summer (DST): UTC-4 (EDT)
- GNIS ID: 1554610

Greenstown is an unincorporated community in Fayette County, West Virginia, United States.

The community derives its name from William Green, the original owner of the town site; a variant name was Towne.
