= Danese, West Virginia =

Unincorporated community in West Virginia, United States

- Unincorporated community
- Location within West Virginia Location within the United States
- Coordinates: 37°55′50″N 80°54′11″W
- Country: United States
- State: West Virginia
- County: Fayette
- Elevation: 2,631 ft (802 m)
- Time zone: UTC-5 (Eastern (EST))
  - Summer (DST): UTC-4 (EDT)
- ZIP code: 25831
- Area codes: 304 & 681
- GNIS feature ID: 1537980

Danese is an unincorporated community in Fayette County, West Virginia, United States. Danese is located on West Virginia Route 41, 5.5 miles (8.9 km) northwest of Meadow Bridge. Danese has a post office with ZIP code 25831.

Danese was originally called Noel; the present name is after the daughter of a settler.
