= Ramsey, West Virginia =

- Unincorporated community
- Location within West Virginia Location within the United States
- Coordinates: 38°10′11″N 81°01′50″W
- Country: United States
- State: West Virginia
- County: Fayette
- Elevation: 1,526 ft (465 m)
- Time zone: UTC-5 (Eastern (EST))
  - Summer (DST): UTC-4 (EDT)
- Area codes: 304 & 681
- GNIS feature ID: 1555439

Ramsey is an unincorporated community in Fayette County, West Virginia, United States. Ramsey is 4.5 miles (7.2 km) northeast of Ansted.

The community was named after W. H. Ramsey, who was instrumental in securing a post office for the town.
