= Victor, Fayette County, West Virginia =

- Unincorporated community
- Location within West Virginia Location within the United States
- Coordinates: 38°07′57″N 81°04′35″W
- Country: United States
- State: West Virginia
- County: Fayette
- Elevation: 1,394 ft (425 m)
- Time zone: UTC-5 (Eastern (EST))
  - Summer (DST): UTC-4 (EDT)
- ZIP code: 25938
- Area codes: 304 & 681
- GNIS feature ID: 1555889

Victor is an unincorporated community in Fayette County, West Virginia, United States. Victor is located on U.S. Route 60, 1 mile (1.6 km) east of Ansted. Victor has a post office with ZIP code 25938.
