= West Virginia Route 41 =

State highway in West Virginia, United States

West Virginia Route 41

Route information
- Maintained by WVDOH
- Length: 64.8 mi (104.3 km)

Major junctions
- South end: WV 210 in Beckley
- US 19 in Beckley; WV 61 in Piney View; US 60 in Lookout; US 19 in Summersville
- North end: WV 55 near Calvin

Location
- Country: United States
- State: West Virginia
- Counties: Raleigh, Fayette, Nicholas

Highway system
- West Virginia State Highway System; Interstate; US; State
← US 40	→ WV 42

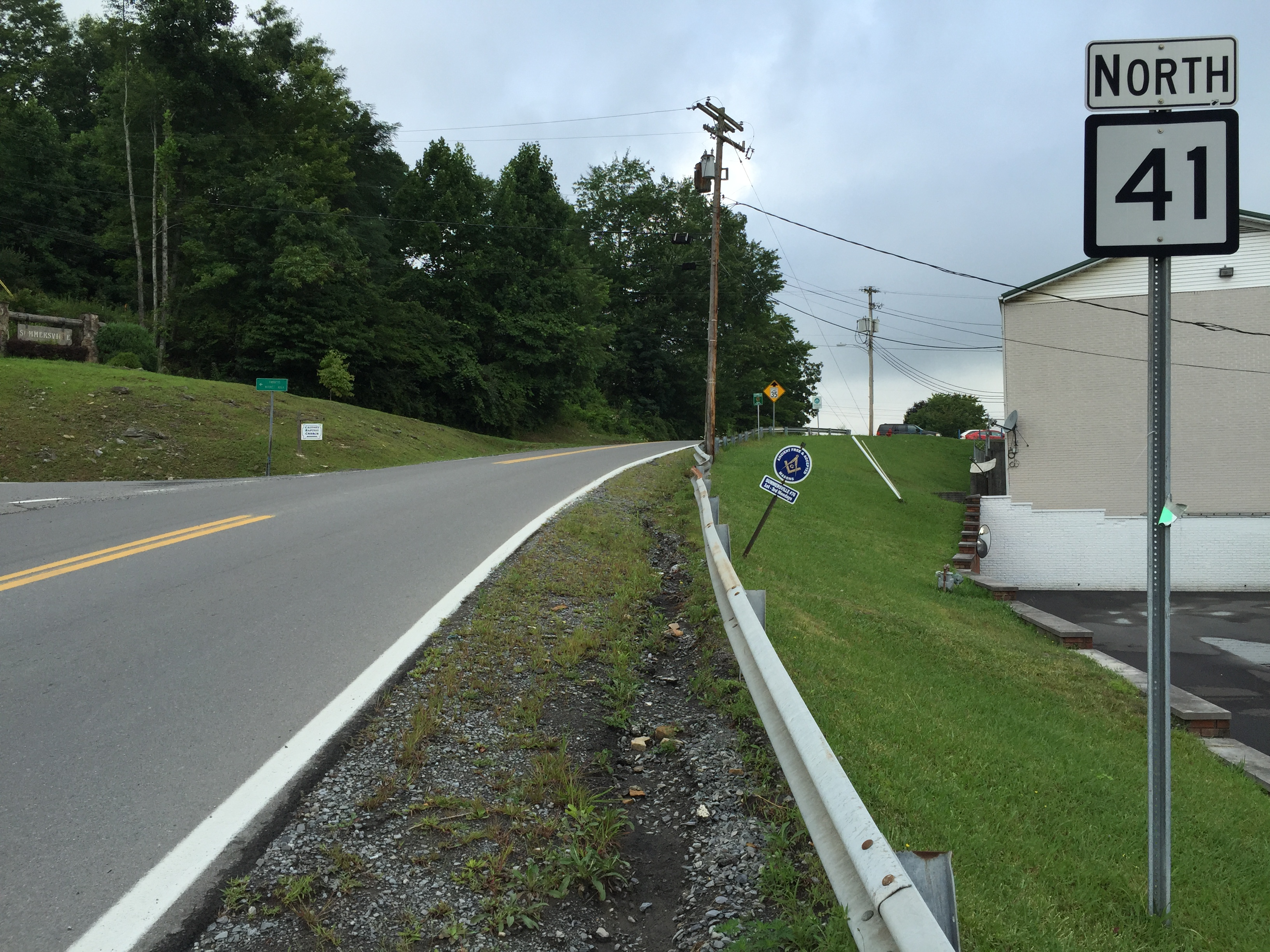
View north along WV 41 at US 19 in Summersville

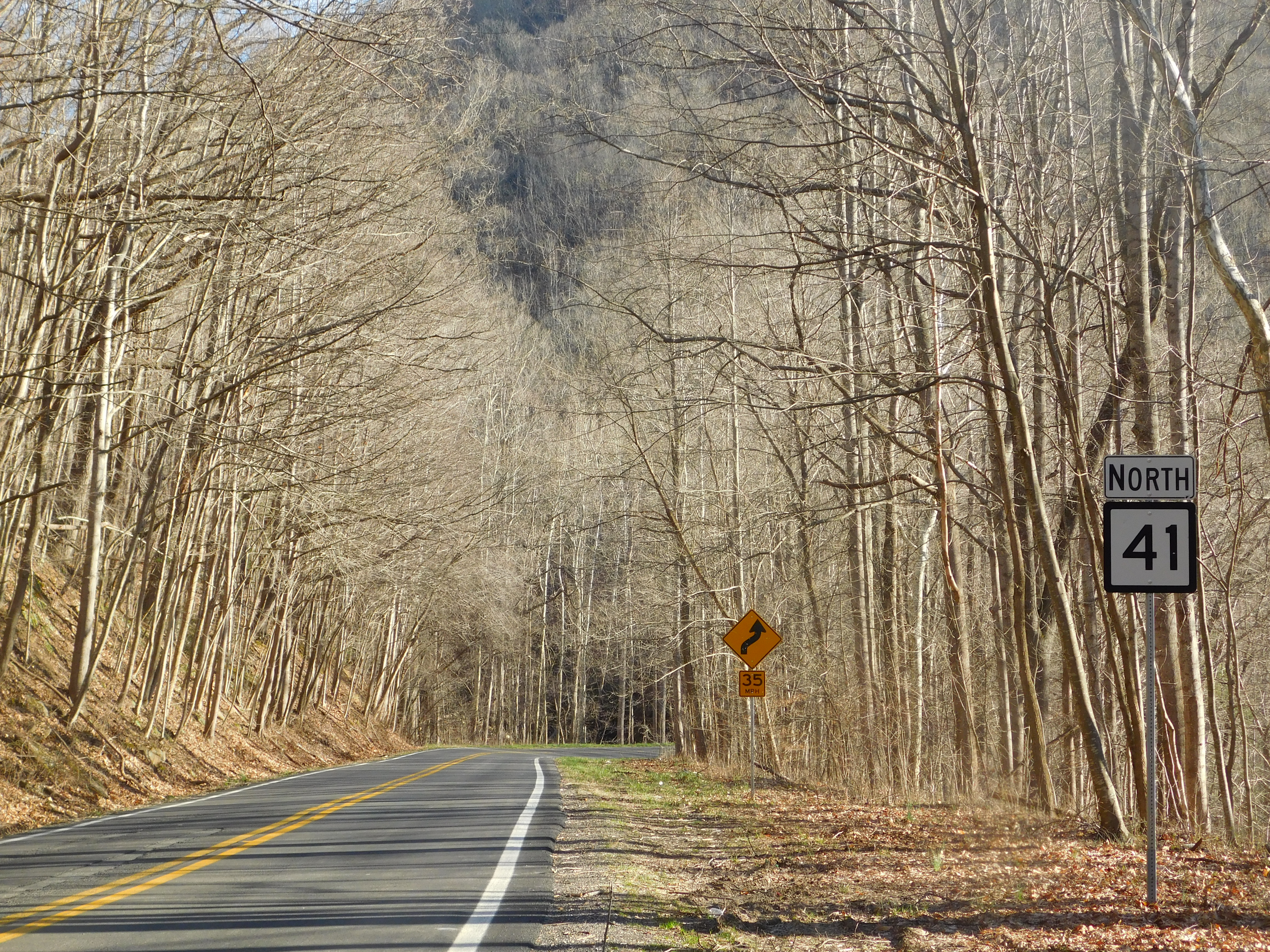
WV 41 in Prince

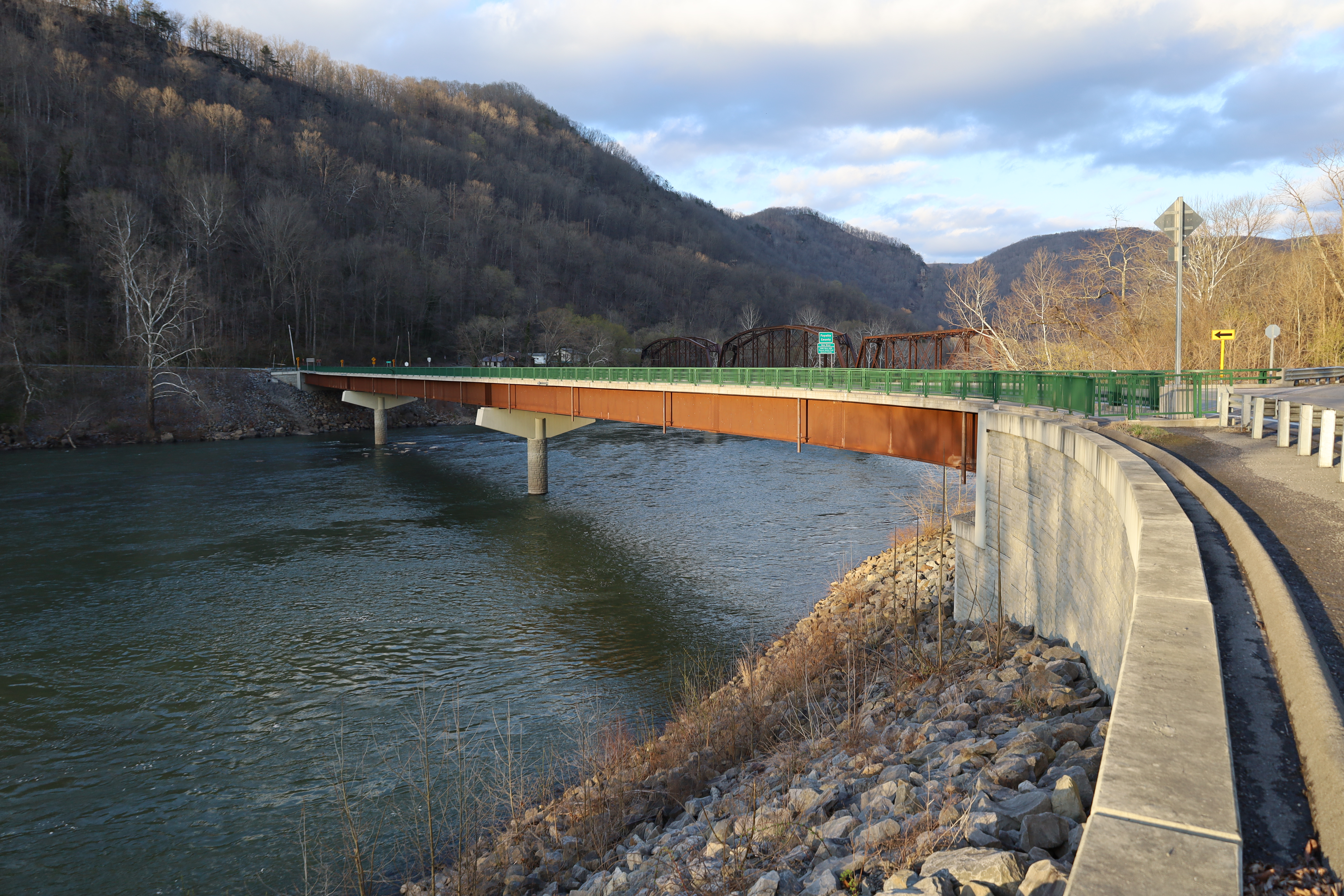
WV 41 crosses the New River at the Thomas Burford Pugh Memorial Bridge near Prince.

West Virginia Route 41 (WV 41) is a 64.8-mile-long (104.3 km) north–south state highway in the central part of the U.S. state of West Virginia. Its southern terminus is at WV 210 in Beckley. Its northern terminus is at WV 55 about 1 mile (1.6 km) west of Calvin.

South of Summersville, WV 41 follows the route of U.S. Route 19 (US 19) prior to the construction of Corridor L of the Appalachian Development Highway System.

== Major intersections ==
County	Location	mi	km	Destinations	Notes
Raleigh	Beckley			WV 210 (South Kanawha Street)	Southern terminus
Raleigh	Beckley			US 19 south (South Eisenhower Drive) – Airport	Southern end of US 19 concurrency
Raleigh	Beckley			US 19 north to Rural Acres Drive (CR 19/8) south / WV 16	Northern end of US 19 concurrency
Raleigh	Beckley			To I-64 / East Beckley Bypass	
Raleigh				WV 61 north – Mount Hope	Southern terminus of WV 61
Fayette				US 60 east – Rainelle	Southern end of US 60 concurrency
Fayette				US 60 west – Lookout, Gauley Bridge	Northern end of US 60 concurrency
Nicholas	Mount Nebo			WV 129 west / CR 13 (Old Nicholas Road) – Summersville Lake	Eastern terminus of WV 129
Nicholas				US 19 south – Beckley	Southern end of US 19 concurrency
Nicholas	Summersville			US 19 north / CR 41/1 (Irish Corner Road) – Sutton	Northern end of US 19 concurrency
Nicholas	Summersville			WV 39 east	Southern end of WV 39 concurrency
Nicholas	Summersville			WV 39 west	Northern end of WV 39 concurrency
Nicholas	Summersville			US 19 – Sutton, Beckley	
Nicholas				WV 55 – Muddlety, Craigsville, Webster Springs	Northern terminus
1.000 mi = 1.609 km; 1.000 km = 0.621 mi: Concurrency terminus
