= Dothan, West Virginia =

Unincorporated community in West Virginia, United States

- Unincorporated community
- Location within West Virginia Location within the United States
- Coordinates: 37°58′02″N 81°13′19″W
- Country: United States
- State: West Virginia
- County: Fayette
- Elevation: 1,680 ft (510 m)
- Time zone: UTC-5 (Eastern (EST))
  - Summer (DST): UTC-4 (EDT)
- ZIP code: 25833
- Area codes: 304 & 681
- GNIS feature ID: 1538280

Dothan is an unincorporated community in Fayette County, West Virginia, United States. Dothan is located on West Virginia Route 612, 4 miles (6.4 km) west of Oak Hill. Dothan had a post office, which closed on October 5, 1991, when postmaster Lewis "Jackie" Toney retired.

The community was named after the ancient city of Dothan, according to local history.
