= Lansing, West Virginia =

- Unincorporated community
- Location within West Virginia Location within the United States
- Coordinates: 38°04′24″N 81°03′56″W
- Country: United States
- State: West Virginia
- County: Fayette
- Elevation: 1,850 ft (560 m)
- Time zone: UTC-5 (Eastern (EST))
  - Summer (DST): UTC-4 (EDT)
- ZIP code: 25862
- Area codes: 304 & 681
- GNIS feature ID: 1541351

Lansing is an unincorporated community in Fayette County, West Virginia, United States. Lansing is located along U.S. Route 19, 2.5 miles (4.0 km) northeast of Fayetteville. Lansing has a post office with ZIP code 25862.
