= Johnson Fork =

Stream in West Virginia, U.S.

Coordinates: 38°02′22″N 81°16′15″W

Johnson Fork is a stream in the U.S. state of West Virginia. It is a tributary of Loop Creek.

Johnson Fork has the name of George Johnson, a pioneer settler.

== See also ==
- List of rivers of West Virginia
