= Falls View, West Virginia =

- Census-designated place (CDP)
- Location within West Virginia Location within the United States
- Coordinates: 38°07′34″N 81°14′46″W
- Country: United States
- State: West Virginia
- County: Fayette

Area
  - Total: 0.405 sq mi (1.05 km^{2})
  - Land: 0.330 sq mi (0.85 km^{2})
  - Water: 0.075 sq mi (0.19 km^{2})
- Elevation: 663 ft (202 m)

Population (2020)
  - Total: 193
  - Density: 585/sq mi (226/km^{2})
- Time zone: UTC-5 (Eastern (EST))
  - Summer (DST): UTC-4 (EDT)
- Area codes: 304 & 681
- GNIS feature ID: 1554440

Falls View is a census-designated place (CDP) in Fayette County, West Virginia, United States. Falls View is located 4 miles (6.4 km) southwest of Gauley Bridge, on the north bank of the Kanawha River. As of the 2020 census, its population was 193 (down from 238 at the 2010 census). Falls View was established in the early 20th century as a residential village for managers from the Electro Metallurgical Co., part of the Union Carbide and Carbon Corporation. Electro Metallurgical operated four ferroalloy plants in the area, powered by hydroelectricity generated at the dam on Kanawha Falls.

== See also ==
- Hawks Nest Tunnel disaster
