= Earl M. Vickers Bridge =

- Coordinates: 38°11′N 81°19′W
- Carries: WV 6
- Crosses: Kanawha River
- Begins: Montgomery, West Virginia
- Ends: Smithers, West Virginia
- Other name: Montgomery Bridge
- Owner: West Virginia Department of Transportation
- Maintained by: West Virginia Department of Transportation

Characteristics
- Design: Thru truss
- Material: Steel
- Total length: 1,665.1 ft (507.5 m)
- Width: 27.9 ft (8.5 m)
- Clearance below: 27.9 ft (8.5 m)
- No. of lanes: 2

History
- Opened: 1956

Location
- Interactive map of Earl M. Vickers Bridge

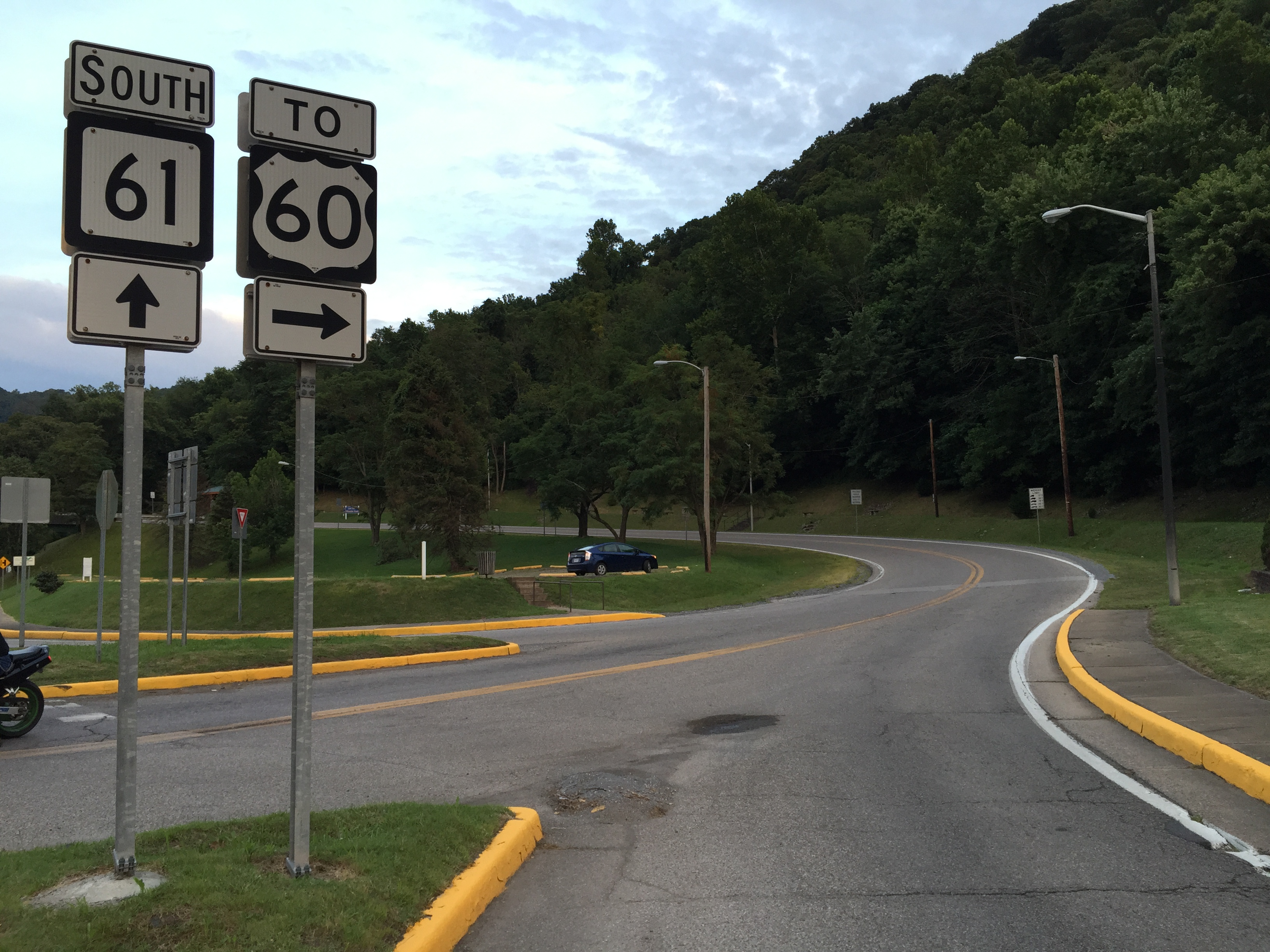
View north at the south end of WV 6 at WV 61 in Montgomery

The Earl M. Vickers Bridge, also known as the Montgomery Bridge, is a steel thru truss bridge over the Kanawha River in West Virginia. It connects West Virginia Route 61 in Montgomery to U.S. Route 60 near Smithers. The bridge opened in 1956. It carries the unsigned highway West Virginia Route 6.
