= Hilton Village, West Virginia =

- Unincorporated community
- Location within West Virginia Location within the United States
- Coordinates: 38°00′54″N 80°54′5″W
- Country: United States
- State: West Virginia
- County: Fayette
- Elevation: 2,598 ft (792 m)
- Time zone: UTC-5 (Eastern (EST))
  - Summer (DST): UTC-4 (EDT)
- Area code: 304
- GNIS ID: 1554720

Hilton Village is an unincorporated community in Fayette County, West Virginia, United States.

It is located on the Midland Trail, part of U.S. Route 60, west of the town of Rainelle.
