= Lookout, West Virginia =

- Unincorporated community
- Location within West Virginia Location within the United States
- Coordinates: 38°03′55″N 80°58′06″W
- Country: United States
- State: West Virginia
- County: Fayette
- Elevation: 2,310 ft (700 m)
- Time zone: UTC-5 (Eastern (EST))
  - Summer (DST): UTC-4 (EDT)
- ZIP code: 25868
- Area codes: 304 & 681
- GNIS feature ID: 1554994

Lookout is an unincorporated community in Fayette County, West Virginia, United States. Lookout is located on U.S. Route 60, 7.5 miles (12.1 km) east of Fayetteville. Lookout has a post office with ZIP code 25868.

The community was so named because Indians used the elevated site to look out over the surrounding area.

== See also ==
- List of ghost towns in West Virginia
