= North Page, West Virginia =

- Unincorporated community
- Location within West Virginia Location within the United States
- Coordinates: 38°04′15″N 81°15′39″W
- Country: United States
- State: West Virginia
- County: Fayette
- Elevation: 1,066 ft (325 m)
- Time zone: UTC-5 (Eastern (EST))
  - Summer (DST): UTC-4 (EDT)
- Area codes: 304 & 681
- GNIS feature ID: 1544230

North Page is an unincorporated community in Fayette County, West Virginia, United States. North Page is 7.5 miles (12.1 km) southwest of Gauley Bridge.
