= Boonesborough, Missouri =

Missouri ghost town

Coordinates: 38.9769854°N 92.149904°W

Boonesborough is an extinct town in Boone County, in the U.S. state of Missouri. Boonesborough was platted in 1836, and named after Daniel Boone. A post office called Boonesboro was established in 1839, and remained in operation until 1850.
