= Ellwood H. May Environmental Park =

City park in Sheboygan, Wisconsin, US

Coordinates: 43.781°N 87.757°W

- Maywood
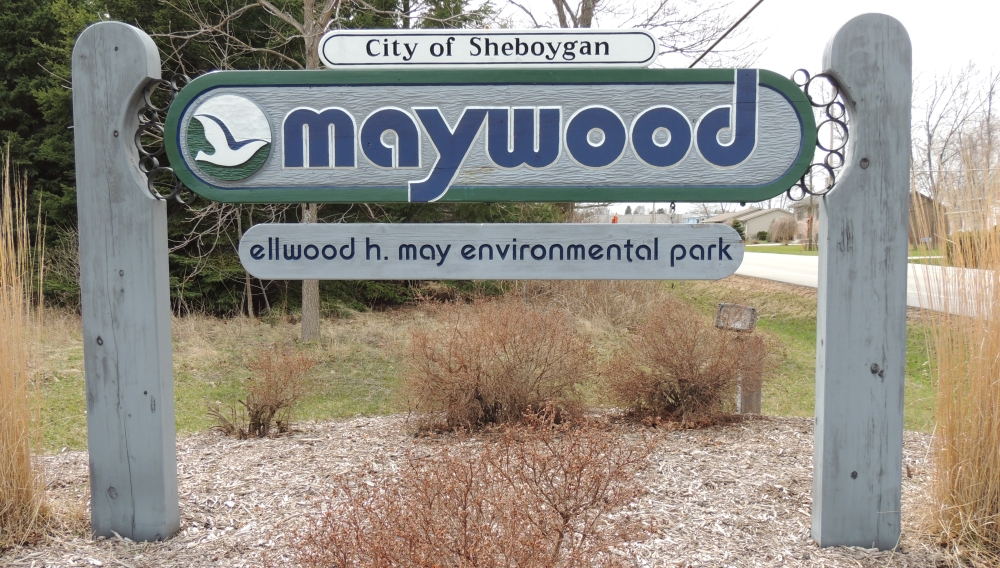
- Interactive map of Ellwood H. May Environmental Park
- Type: Urban park
- Location: 3615 Mueller Road; Sheboygan, Wisconsin; United States
- Area: 135 acres (55 ha)
- Operator: City of Sheboygan
- Visitors: 17,000+
- Open: 6 AM - 10 PM; Yeararound
- Hiking trails: 5 miles (trail length)
- Species: American woodcock Red-tailed hawk Hooded warbler
- Parking: Yes
- Website: www.gomaywood.org

Ellwood H. May Environmental Park (known as Maywood) is a 135-acre (55 ha) city-owned park in Sheboygan, Wisconsin. The park offers hiking and skiing trails and is open 365-days a year.

The park shares a common border with Evergreen Park to the south.

== Wildlife ==
Deer can be often spotted throughout the park. A butterfly and hummingbird garden is located in the park. Habitats vary over park from restored prairie to old-field, hardwood forest, ponds, mixed woods and the Pigeon River.

== Ecology Center ==
The recently built Ecology Center provides hands-on educational opportunities for students and the general public. The center holds science programs, summer camps and public events. Observation Bee Hive is located within the Ecology Center.

== Maywood Earth Ride ==
The Maywood Earth Ride is an annual non-competitive event for bicycle riders of all ages and abilities. The Earth Ride is not a race and the course is not closed. The annual event rises funds for maintenance of the park.
