= Calvin, West Virginia =

Unincorporated community in West Virginia, United States

- Unincorporated community
- Location within West Virginia Location within the United States
- Coordinates: 38°20′12″N 80°42′52″W
- Country: United States
- State: West Virginia
- County: Nicholas
- Elevation: 2,251 ft (686 m)
- Time zone: UTC-5 (Eastern (EST))
  - Summer (DST): UTC-4 (EDT)
- ZIP code: 26660
- Area codes: 304 & 681
- GNIS feature ID: 1550587

Calvin is an unincorporated community in Nicholas County, West Virginia, United States. Calvin is located on West Virginia Route 55, 8.5 miles (13.7 km) northeast of Summersville. Calvin has a post office with ZIP code 26660.
