= Maywood, West Virginia =

- Unincorporated community
- Location within West Virginia Location within the United States
- Coordinates: 37°58′18″N 80°48′54″W
- Country: United States
- State: West Virginia
- County: Fayette
- Elevation: 3,123 ft (952 m)
- Time zone: UTC-5 (Eastern (EST))
  - Summer (DST): UTC-4 (EDT)
- GNIS ID: 1549812

Maywood is an unincorporated community in Fayette County, West Virginia, United States. It was also known as Lees Tree.
