= Corliss, West Virginia =

Unincorporated community in West Virginia, United States

- Unincorporated community
- Location within West Virginia Location within the United States
- Coordinates: 38°2′3″N 80°52′12″W
- Country: United States
- State: West Virginia
- County: Fayette
- Elevation: 2,789 ft (850 m)
- Time zone: UTC-5 (Eastern (EST))
  - Summer (DST): UTC-4 (EDT)
- GNIS ID: 1554193

Corliss is an unincorporated community in Fayette County, West Virginia, United States.
