= Meadow Bridge, West Virginia =

- Town
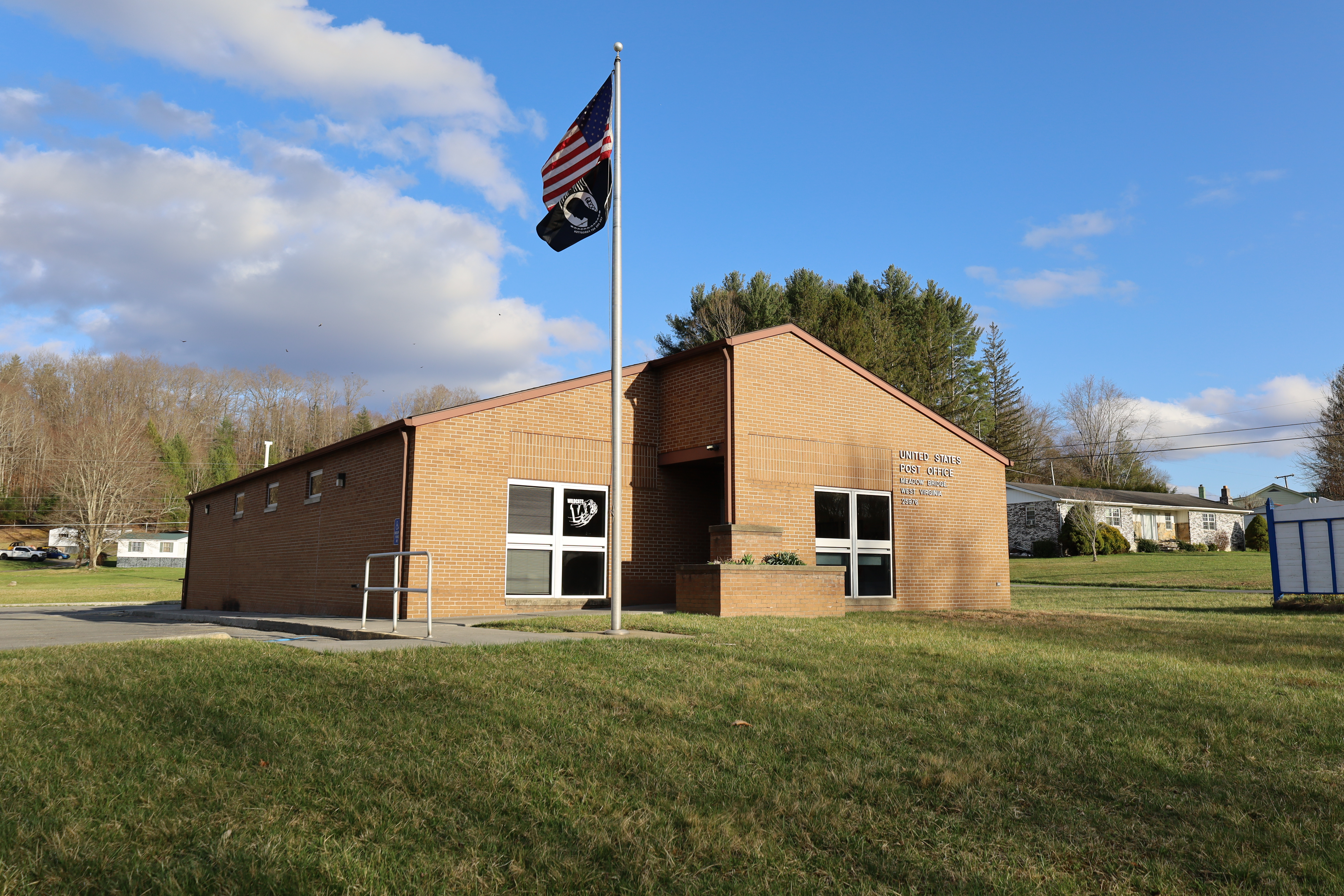
- Meadow Bridge Post Office in 2022

- Location of Meadow Bridge in Fayette County, West Virginia.
- Coordinates: 37°51′45″N 80°51′19″W
- Country: United States
- State: West Virginia
- County: Fayette
- Established: 1890

Area
  - Total: 0.41 sq mi (1.05 km^{2})
  - Land: 0.41 sq mi (1.05 km^{2})
  - Water: 0 sq mi (0.00 km^{2})
- Elevation: 2,431 ft (741 m)

Population (2020)
  - Total: 324
  - Density: 852.5/sq mi (329.16/km^{2})
- Time zone: UTC-5 (Eastern (EST))
  - Summer (DST): UTC-4 (EDT)
- ZIP code: 25976
- Area code: 304
- FIPS code: 54-52780
- GNIS feature ID: 1543055

Meadow Bridge is a town in Fayette County, West Virginia, United States. The population was 324 at the 2020 census. The first settler of the area was John Gwin, closely followed by Dan Griffin.

The community took its name from a nearby bridge over Meadow Creek.

== History ==
Sometime in 1890, the first Meadow Bridge post office was established, and gave the area the name of Montrode. This was later changed to Clute, after the Virginia lumberman Theodore Clute, who came with the railroad to establish a sawmill in the area. With the help of the Meadow River Lumber company, and Theodore Clute, millions of feet of lumber were cut, and soon a town sprang up with shops and houses.

With industry in Meadow Bridge, on July 26, 1920, it was incorporated into an official town. Although industry came to the small town of Meadow Bridge, progress was slow and arduous. After several years of hard fighting, in 1924, they finally were able to bring a high school to the town, Meadow Bridge High School.

Part of their troubles was that they were isolated from the rest of Fayette County. That changed in 1937, when a seven-mile stretch of road was hard-surfaced, linking Meadow Bridge and the nearby town of Danese. In 1938, a road linking the town of Hinton and Rainelle ran through Meadow Bridge, linking all the towns together and, by extension, to Route 41. This finally gave Meadow Bridge a path to the western part of Fayette County.

== Industry ==
In 1908, the Meadow River Lumber Company made a 20-mile stretch of track down to Meadow Bridge. Most say that this was the true beginning of Meadow Bridge becoming a town. After their purchase, the Hutchinson Lumber Company purchased a large tract of timberland in 1913.

== Geography ==
Meadow Bridge is located at 37°51′45″N 80°51′19″W (37.862399, -80.855169).

According to the United States Census Bureau, the town has a total area of 0.41 square miles (1.06 km^{2}), all land.

== Demographics ==
Historical population
Census	Pop.	Note	%±
1930	476		—
1940	477		0.2%
1950	597		25.2%
1960	426		−28.6%
1970	429		0.7%
1980	530		23.5%
1990	325		−38.7%
2000	321		−1.2%
2010	379		18.1%
2020	324		−14.5%
U.S. Decennial Census

=== 2010 census ===
As of the census of 2010, there were 379 people, 165 households, and 97 families living in the town. The population density was 924.4 inhabitants per square mile (356.9/km^{2}). There were 186 housing units at an average density of 453.7 per square mile (175.2/km^{2}). The racial makeup of the town was 99.2% White, 0.3% Asian, 0.3% from other races, and 0.3% from two or more races. Hispanic or Latino of any race were 0.3% of the population.

There were 165 households, of which 24.2% had children under the age of 18 living with them, 41.8% were married couples living together, 12.1% had a female householder with no husband present, 4.8% had a male householder with no wife present, and 41.2% were non-families. 37.6% of all households were made up of individuals, and 24.9% had someone living alone who was 65 years of age or older. The average household size was 2.30 and the average family size was 3.01.

The median age in the town was 42.5 years. 22.7% of residents were under the age of 18; 6.2% were between the ages of 18 and 24; 24.8% were from 25 to 44; 23.5% were from 45 to 64; and 22.7% were 65 years of age or older. The gender makeup of the town was 47.5% male and 52.5% female.

=== 2000 census ===
As of the census of 2000, there were 321 people, 136 households, and 93 families living in the town. The population density was 791.3 inhabitants per square mile (302.3/km^{2}). There were 175 housing units at an average density of 431.4 per square mile (164.8/km^{2}). The racial makeup of the town was 100.00% White.

There were 136 households, out of which 29.4% had children under the age of 18 living with them, 47.1% were married couples living together, 18.4% had a female householder with no husband present, and 30.9% were non-families. 28.7% of all households were made up of individuals, and 14.7% had someone living alone who was 65 years of age or older. The average household size was 2.36 and the average family size was 2.83.

In the town, the population was spread out, with 22.1% under the age of 18, 11.2% from 18 to 24, 25.9% from 25 to 44, 24.0% from 45 to 64, and 16.8% who were 65 years of age or older. The median age was 39 years. For every 100 females, there were 76.4 males. For every 100 females age 18 and over, there were 83.8 males.

The median income for a household in the town was $23,194, and the median income for a family was $27,000. Males had a median income of $24,444 versus $14,625 for females. The per capita income for the town was $12,526. About 15.7% of families and 24.1% of the population were below the poverty line, including 34.5% of those under age 18 and 22.0% of those age 65 or over.
