= Hamilton, West Virginia =

- Unincorporated community
- Location within West Virginia Location within the United States
- Coordinates: 38°1′17″N 81°15′47″W
- Country: United States
- State: West Virginia
- County: Fayette
- Elevation: 1,224 ft (373 m)
- Time zone: UTC-5 (Eastern (EST))
  - Summer (DST): UTC-4 (EDT)
- GNIS ID: 1554630

Hamilton is an unincorporated community in Fayette County, West Virginia, United States.
