= Corliss =

Corliss is both a surname and a given name.

== People ==
Given name

- Corliss Lamont (1902–1995), American philosopher, political activist, and philanthropist
- C. C. Moseley (1894–1974), American aviator and aviation businessman
- Corliss Palmer (1899–1952), American silent film actress
- Corliss P. Stone (1806–1873), mayor of Seattle and businessman
- Corliss Waitman (born 1995), Belgian-American football player
- Corliss Williamson (born 1973), basketball player

Surname

- Augustus W. Corliss (1837–1907), American writer, historian and Civil War veteran
- George Henry Corliss (1817–1888), inventor of the Corliss steam engine
- George W. Corliss (1834–1903), American Civil War recipient of the Medal of Honor
- Guy C. H. Corliss (1858–1937), American judge and justice of the Supreme Court of North Dakota
- Jack Corliss, scientist and discoverer of undersea hydrothermal vents
- Jeb Corliss (born 1976), American skydiver and base jumper
- John Blaisdell Corliss (1851–1929), U.S. Representative from Michigan
- Stephen P. Corliss (1842–1904), American Civil War recipient of the Medal of Honor
- Richard Corliss (1944–2015), American journalist, Time magazine
- William R. Corliss (1926–2011), American physicist and writer

== Fictional ==
- Corliss Archer, teen girl character of various American works including the radio show Meet Corliss Archer (1943–1956)
- Bud Corliss, villain of A Kiss Before Dying (novel) and two film adaptations (renamed Jonathan Corliss in the second)
