= Kincaid, West Virginia =

- Census-designated place (CDP)
- Location within West Virginia Location within the United States
- Coordinates: 38°02′26″N 81°16′12″W
- Country: United States
- State: West Virginia
- County: Fayette

Area
  - Total: 0.874 sq mi (2.26 km^{2})
  - Land: 0.861 sq mi (2.23 km^{2})
  - Water: 0.013 sq mi (0.034 km^{2})
- Elevation: 1,138 ft (347 m)

Population (2020)
  - Total: 191
  - Density: 222/sq mi (85.7/km^{2})
- Time zone: UTC-5 (Eastern (EST))
  - Summer (DST): UTC-4 (EDT)
- ZIP code: 25119
- Area codes: 304 & 681
- GNIS feature ID: 1554877

Kincaid is a census-designated place (CDP) in Fayette County, West Virginia, United States. As of the 2020 census, its population was 191 (down from 260 at the 2010 census). Kincaid is located on West Virginia Route 61, 8 miles (13 km) northwest of Oak Hill. Kincaid has a post office with ZIP code 25119. The community was established in 1878.

== Kincaid family ==
In 1807, James Kincaid and his wife Mary Tritt Kincaid moved from old Virginia and settled in Greenbrier County. They were not favorably impressed with the location and moved further to the west, thus establishing the present-day community. Of Scotch-Irish descent, the Kincaids became "one of the largest most influential, best-known families that settled in Fayette county." The section where Page, West Virginia now stands, and the territory further north, was first known as Kincaid because the region was settled by the Kincaid family.

== Transport ==
The Norfolk Southern Railway line passes through the community; however, there is currently no passenger service or station.

== Unsolved murder ==
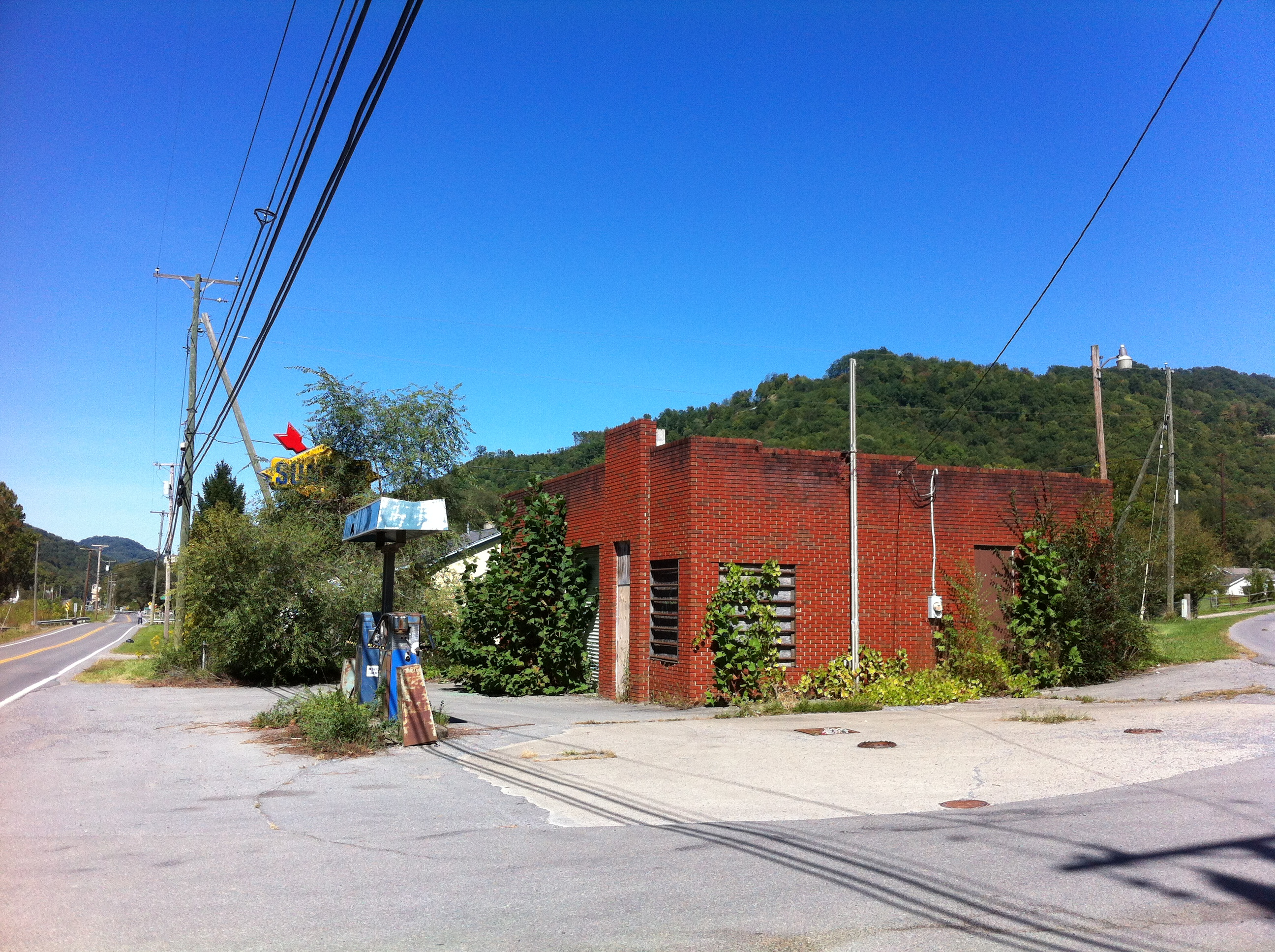
Abandoned Sunoco service station in Kincaid, as of 2013

Eddie Brown was murdered in Kincaid in 1992 when he was walking to his job at the Kincaid Sunoco gas station, 1.5 miles from his home. The station opened at 06:00, but Eddie always opened for 04:00, to provide service for mine workers and school children. His walk to work took him along the railroad line and Route 61. At 02:39 on January 22, 1992, Eslie Bills, the former station owner, was driving down Route 61. Bills knew Eddie's route and witnessed him opening the station. At approximately 04:00, the gas station door was found ajar, the lights off, and the alarm buzzing. The Marshalls, who regularly traveled through Kincaid at that time of night to deliver the Beckley Post-Herald, found Eddie badly beaten and confused. He succumbed to his wounds on February 20, 1992. The murder remains unsolved.

== Coal and electricity ==
The Loup Creek Colliery was established in 1902 for mining, and by 1918, as part of its coal operations, the company supplied electric current to 274 customers in Page and Kincaid.
