= Piney View, West Virginia =

- Census-designated place (CDP)
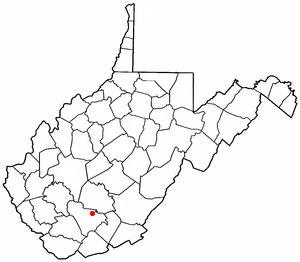
- Location of Piney View, West Virginia
- Coordinates: 37°50′06″N 81°07′23″W
- Country: United States
- State: West Virginia
- County: Raleigh

Area
  - Total: 4.1 sq mi (10.5 km^{2})
  - Land: 4.0 sq mi (10.4 km^{2})
  - Water: 0.039 sq mi (0.1 km^{2})
- Elevation: 2,375 ft (724 m)

Population (2020)
  - Total: 902
  - Density: 225/sq mi (86.7/km^{2})
- Time zone: UTC-5 (Eastern (EST))
  - Summer (DST): UTC-4 (EDT)
- ZIP code: 25906
- Area code: 304
- FIPS code: 54-63988
- GNIS feature ID: 2389677

Piney View is a census-designated place (CDP) in Raleigh County, West Virginia, United States. The population was 902 at the 2020 census.

== Geography ==
According to the United States Census Bureau, the CDP has a total area of 4.1 square miles (10.5 km^{2}); 4.1 square miles (10.4 km^{2}) of this is land, and 0.03 square miles (0.1 km^{2}) is water.

== Demographics ==
Historical population
| Census | Pop. | Note | %± |
|---|---|---|---|
| 2000 | 1,046 | | — |
| 2010 | 989 | | −5.4% |
| 2020 | 902 | | −8.8% |
U.S. Decennial Census

At the 2000 census there were 1,046 people, 420 households, and 307 families living in the CDP. The population density was 99.5 people per square mile (38.4/km^{2}). There were 461 housing units at an average density of 43.9/sq mi (16.9/km^{2}). The racial makeup of the CDP was 98.37% White, 1.15% African American, 0.10% Native American, 0.10% Asian, and 0.29% from two or more races. Hispanic or Latino of any race were 0.96%.

Of the 420 households 30.2% had children under the age of 18 living with them, 60.0% were married couples living together, 8.6% had a female householder with no husband present, and 26.9% were non-families. 23.1% of households were one person and 11.4% were one person aged 65 or older. The average household size was 2.49 and the average family size was 2.92.

The age distribution was 21.3% under the age of 18, 7.9% from 18 to 24, 28.4% from 25 to 44, 27.7% from 45 to 64, and 14.6% 65 or older. The median age was 40 years. For every 100 females, there were 98.9 males. For every 100 females age 18 and over, there were 97.4 males.

The median household income was $26,324 and the median family income was $32,917. Males had a median income of $31,964 versus $16,894 for females. The per capita income for the CDP was $12,385. About 9.3% of families and 12.7% of the population were below the poverty line, including 19.0% of those under age 18 and none of those age 65 or over.
