= West Virginia Route 61 =

State highway in West Virginia, United States

West Virginia Route 61

Route information
- Maintained by WVDOH
- Length: 63.3 mi (101.9 km)

Major junctions
- South end: WV 41 in Piney View
- WV 16 from Mount Hope to Oak Hill; US 19 near Oak Hill; I-64 / I-77 near Charleston; US 119 in Charleston
- North end: US 60 in Charleston

Location
- Country: United States
- State: West Virginia
- Counties: Raleigh, Fayette, Kanawha

Highway system
- West Virginia State Highway System; Interstate; US; State
← US 60	→ WV 62

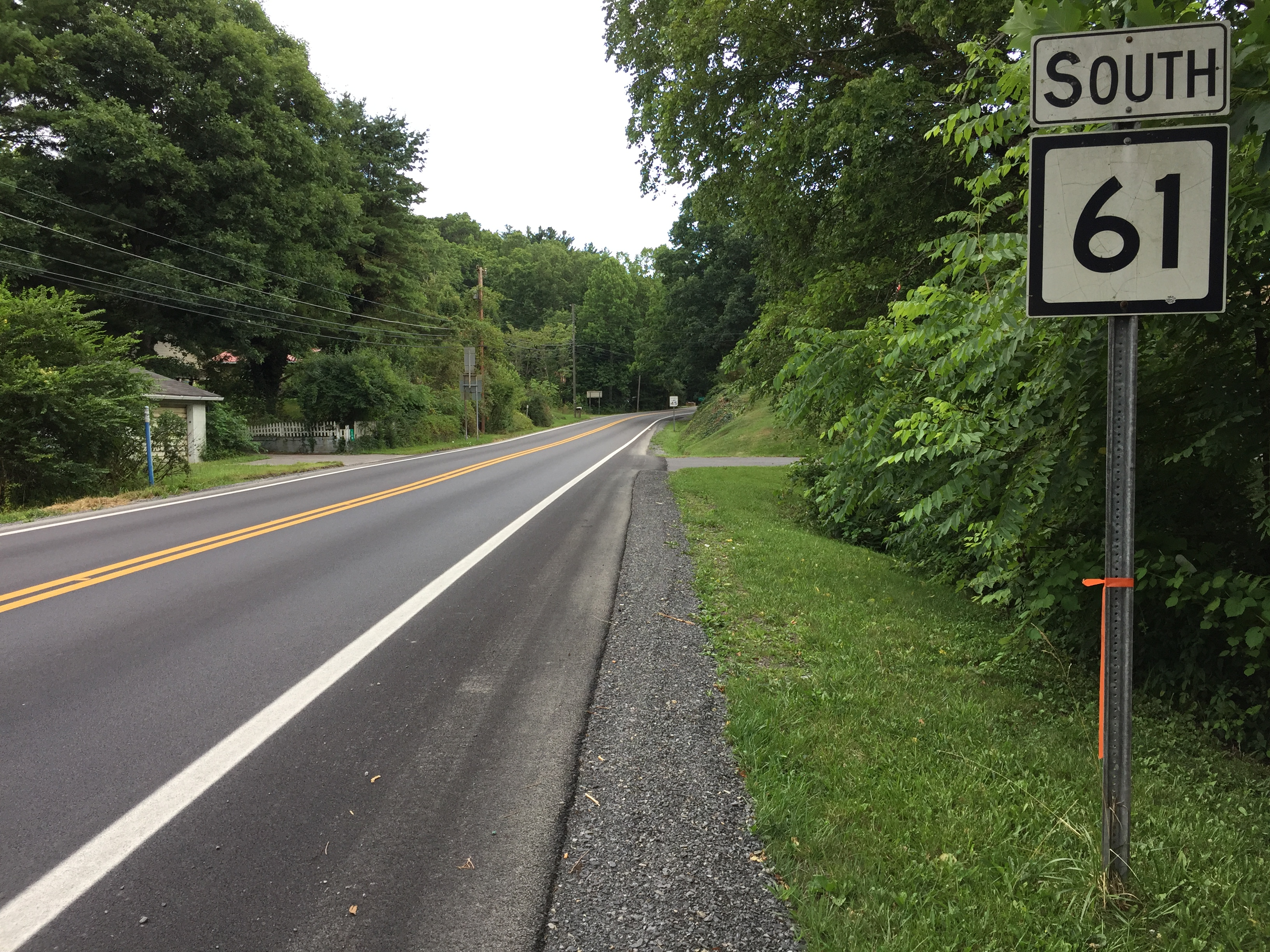
View south along WV 61 at WV 16 just southeast of Mount Hope

West Virginia Route 61 is a north–south state highway in central and southern West Virginia. The southern terminus of the route is at West Virginia Route 41 in Piney View. The northern terminus is at U.S. Route 60 (Patrick Street Bridge) in Charleston.

== Major intersections ==
County	Location	mi	km	Destinations	Notes
Raleigh				WV 41 – Prince, Beckley	
Fayette	Mount Hope			WV 16 south – Beckley	south end of WV 16 overlap
Fayette	see WV 16				
Fayette	Oak Hill			WV 16 north (Main Street) – Fayetteville	north end of WV 16 overlap
Fayette	Montgomery			To US 60 (via WV 6)	to Montgomery Bridge
Kanawha	Chelyan			To I-64 / I-77 / US 60 – Cedar Grove, Charleston, Beckley	interchange; I-77 exit 85; to Chelyan Bridge
Kanawha	Marmet			WV 94 south to I-64 / I-77 – Racine	
Kanawha	Charleston			I-64 / I-77 – Beckley, Charleston	I-77 exit 95; to Chuck Yeager Bridge
Kanawha	Charleston			To 36th Street west / I-64 north / I-77	to Kanawha City Bridge
Kanawha	Charleston			Thayer Street - Downtown Charleston	to South Side Bridge
Kanawha	Charleston			To Oakwood Road / I-64 / US 119	to Fort Hill Bridge
Kanawha	Charleston–South Charleston line			US 60 (Patrick Street) to WV 25 – South Charleston	to Patrick Street Bridge
1.000 mi = 1.609 km; 1.000 km = 0.621 mi: Concurrency terminus
