= Fayette County, West Virginia =

County in West Virginia, United States

- County
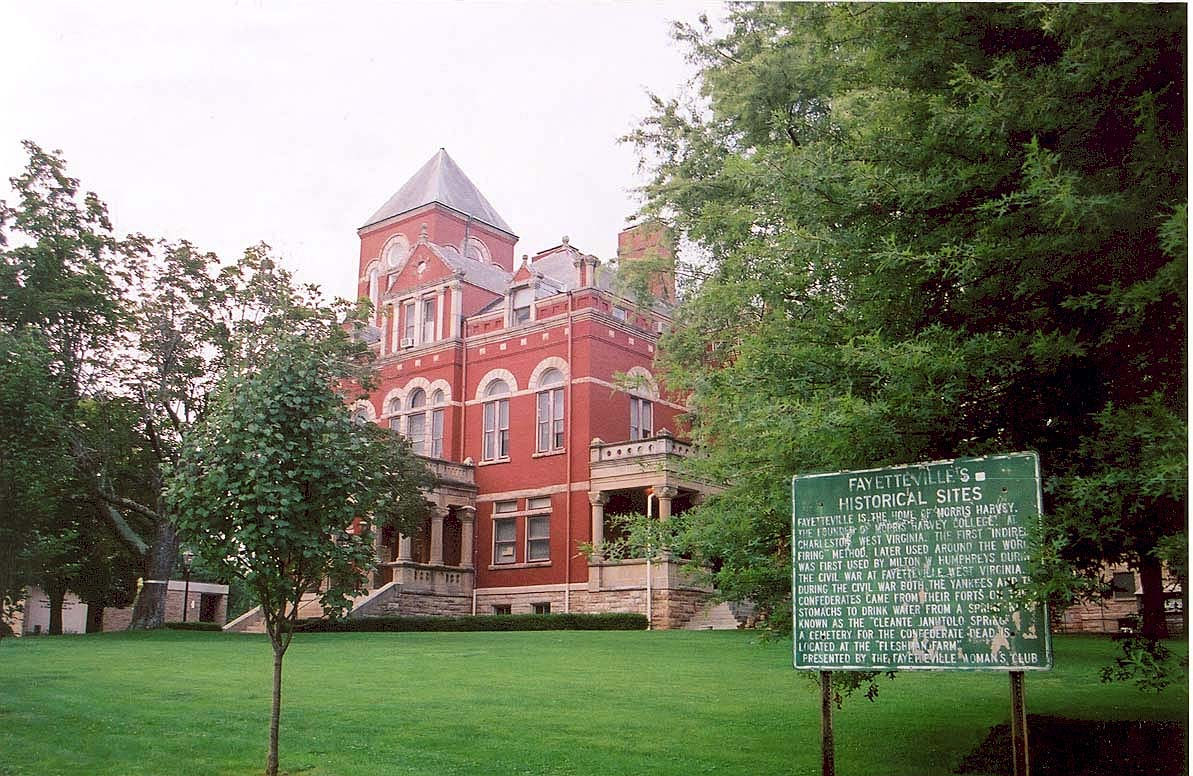
- Fayette County courthouse in Fayetteville

- Flag Seal

- Location within the U.S. state of West Virginia
- Coordinates: 38°02′N 81°05′W
- Country: United States
- State: West Virginia
- Founded: February 28, 1831
- Named for: Marquis de la Fayette
- Seat: Fayetteville
- Largest city: Oak Hill

Area
  - Total: 668 sq mi (1,730 km^{2})
  - Land: 662 sq mi (1,710 km^{2})
  - Water: 6.8 sq mi (18 km^{2}) 1.0%

Population (2020)
  - Total: 40,488
  - Estimate (2025): 38,165 ▼
  - Density: 61.2/sq mi (23.6/km^{2})
- Time zone: UTC−5 (Eastern)
  - Summer (DST): UTC−4 (EDT)
- Congressional district: 1st
- Website: fayettecounty.wv.gov/Pages/default.aspx

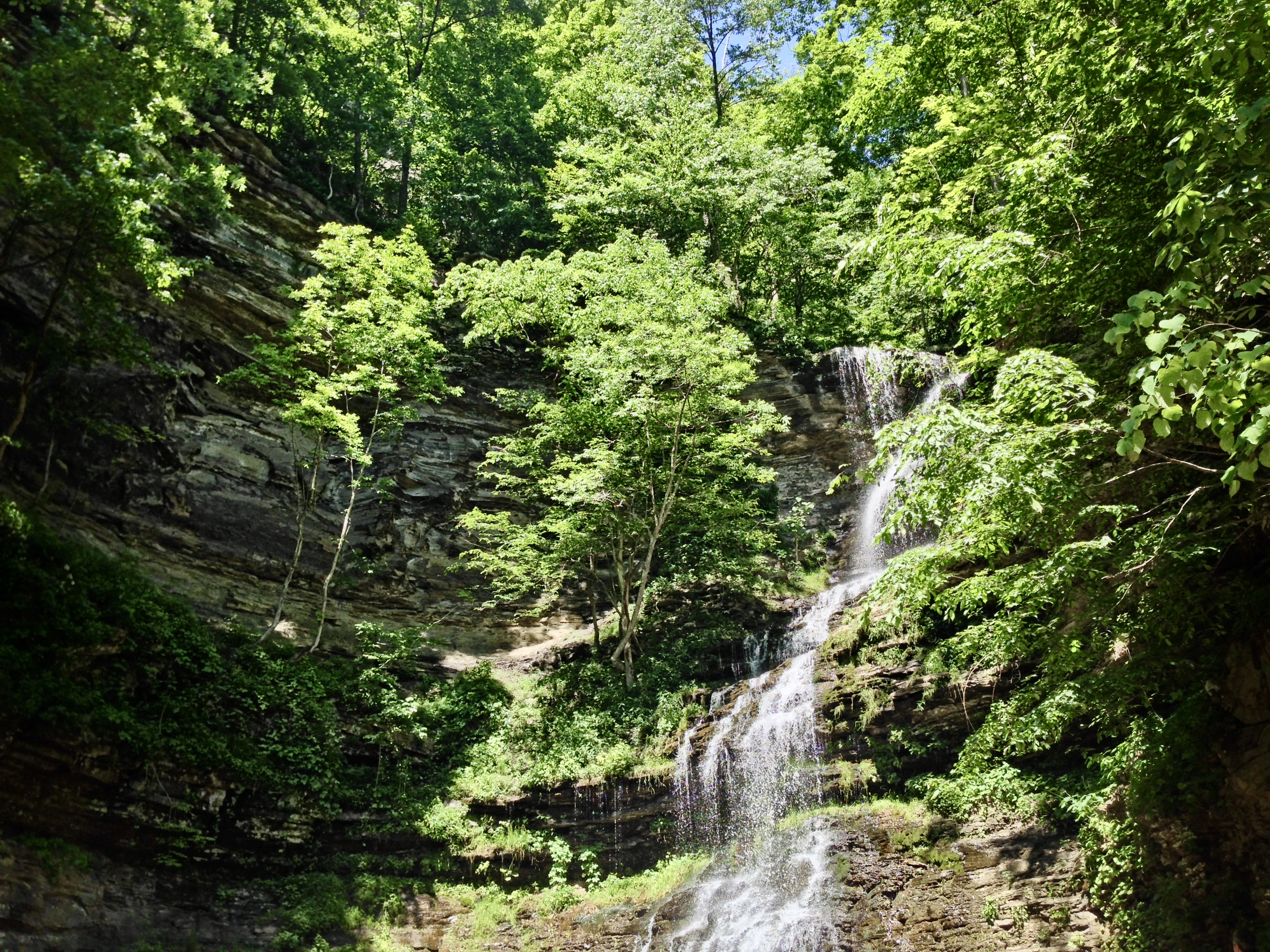
Cathedral Falls

Fayette County is a county in the U.S. state of West Virginia. As of the 2020 census, the indicated population was 40,488. Its county seat is Fayetteville. It is part of the Beckley, WV Metropolitan Statistical Area in Southern West Virginia.

== History ==
Fayette County—originally Fayette County, Virginia—was created by the Virginia General Assembly in February 1831, from parts of Greenbrier, Kanawha, Nicholas, and Logan counties. It was named in honor of the Marquis de la Fayette, who had played a key role assisting the Continental Army during the American Revolutionary War.

The second Virginia county so named, it was among the 50 counties which Virginia lost when West Virginia was admitted to the Union as the 35th state in 1863, during the American Civil War. The earlier Fayette County, Virginia existed from 1780 to 1792, and was lost when Kentucky was admitted to the Union. Accordingly, in the government records of Virginia, there will be listings for Fayette County from 1780 to 1792 and Fayette County from 1831 to 1863.

A substantial portion was subdivided from Fayette County to form Raleigh County in 1850. In 1871, an Act of the West Virginia Legislature severed a small portion to form part of Summers County.

In 1863, West Virginia's counties were divided into civil townships, with the intention of encouraging local government. Fayette County was originally divided into four townships: Falls, Fayetteville, Mountain Cove, and Sewell Mountain. A fifth township, Kanawha, was formed from part of Falls Township in 1870. These townships proved impractical in the heavily rural state, and in 1872 the townships were converted into magisterial districts. The portion of Fayette County that was taken to form Summers County was from Sewell Mountain Township. A sixth district, Quinnimont, was organized in the 1880s, and a seventh, Nuttall, was formed from part of Mountain Cove District in the 1890s. In the 1970s, the historic magisterial districts were consolidated into three new districts: New Haven, Plateau, and Valley.

Fayette County was the location of a disastrous mine explosion at Red Ash in March 1900, in which 46 miners were killed.

Fayette County elected several African Americans to the West Virginia House of Delegates during the early decades of the 20th century including the first, second and third who served in the state legislature.

== Geography ==
According to the United States Census Bureau, the county has a total area of 668 square miles (1,730 km^{2}), of which 662 square miles (1,710 km^{2}) is land and 6.8 square miles (18 km^{2}) (1.0%) is water. Plum Orchard Lake, a reservoir southwest of Oak Hill, is the second largest lake in West Virginia.

=== Major highways ===
- Interstate 64
- Interstate 77
- U.S. Route 19
- U.S. Route 60
- West Virginia Route 16
- West Virginia Route 39
- West Virginia Route 41
- West Virginia Route 61
- West Virginia Route 612

=== Adjacent counties ===
- Nicholas County (north)
- Greenbrier County (east)
- Summers County (southeast)
- Raleigh County (south)
- Kanawha County (west)

=== National protected areas ===
- Gauley River National Recreation Area (part)
- New River Gorge National Park and Preserve (part)

== Demographics ==
Historical population
Census	Pop.	Note	%±
1840	3,924		—
1850	3,955		0.8%
1860	5,997		51.6%
1870	6,647		10.8%
1880	11,560		73.9%
1890	20,542		77.7%
1900	31,987		55.7%
1910	51,903		62.3%
1920	60,377		16.3%
1930	72,050		19.3%
1940	80,628		11.9%
1950	82,443		2.3%
1960	61,731		−25.1%
1970	49,332		−20.1%
1980	57,863		17.3%
1990	47,952		−17.1%
2000	47,579		−0.8%
2010	46,039		−3.2%
2020	40,488		−12.1%
2025 (est.)	38,165	▼	−5.7%
U.S. Decennial Census; 1790–1960 1900–1990; 1990–2000 2010–2020

=== 2020 census ===
As of the 2020 census, the county had a population of 40,488. Of the residents, 20.8% were under the age of 18 and 22.1% were 65 years of age or older; the median age was 44.9 years. For every 100 females there were 100.9 males, and for every 100 females age 18 and over there were 99.5 males.

The racial makeup of the county was 90.1% White, 4.1% Black or African American, 0.3% American Indian and Alaska Native, 0.3% Asian, 0.5% from some other race, and 4.7% from two or more races. Hispanic or Latino residents of any race comprised 1.3% of the population.

There were 16,441 households in the county, of which 27.4% had children under the age of 18 living with them and 28.4% had a female householder with no spouse or partner present. About 29.7% of all households were made up of individuals and 15.0% had someone living alone who was 65 years of age or older.

There were 19,089 housing units, of which 13.9% were vacant. Among occupied housing units, 75.8% were owner-occupied and 24.2% were renter-occupied. The homeowner vacancy rate was 2.1% and the rental vacancy rate was 7.5%.

Fayette County, West Virginia – Racial and ethnic composition Note: the US Census treats Hispanic/Latino as an ethnic category. This table excludes Latinos from the racial categories and assigns them to a separate category. Hispanics/Latinos may be of any race.
Race / Ethnicity (NH = Non-Hispanic)	Pop 2000	Pop 2010	Pop 2020	% 2000	% 2010	% 2020
White alone (NH)	43,874	42,763	36,308	92.21%	92.88%	89.67%
Black or African American alone (NH)	2,647	2,097	1,662	5.56%	4.55%	4.10%
Native American or Alaska Native alone (NH)	124	91	100	0.26%	0.19%	0.24%
Asian alone (NH)	144	89	105	0.30%	0.19%	0.25%
Pacific Islander alone (NH)	15	5	1	0.03%	0.01%	0.00%
Other race alone (NH)	18	19	114	0.03%	0.04%	0.28%
Mixed race or Multiracial (NH)	432	573	1,673	0.90%	1.24%	4.13%
Hispanic or Latino (any race)	325	402	525	0.68%	0.87%	1.29%
Total	47,579	46,039	40,488	100.00%	100.00%	100.00%

=== 2010 census ===
As of the 2010 United States census, there were 46,039 people, 18,813 households, and 12,459 families living in the county. The population density was 69.6 inhabitants per square mile (26.9/km^{2}). There were 21,618 housing units at an average density of 32.7 per square mile (12.6/km^{2}). The racial makeup of the county was 93.5% white, 4.6% black or African American, 0.2% Asian, 0.2% American Indian, 0.2% from other races, and 1.3% from two or more races. Those of Hispanic or Latino origin made up 0.9% of the population. In terms of ancestry, 16.9% were German, 15.5% were Irish, 10.8% were English, and 9.5% were American.

Of the 18,813 households, 28.6% had children under the age of 18 living with them, 48.7% were married couples living together, 12.5% had a female householder with no husband present, 33.8% were non-families, and 29.1% of all households were made up of individuals. The average household size was 2.35 and the average family size was 2.87. The median age was 43.0 years.

The median income for a household in the county was $31,912 and the median income for a family was $42,077. Males had a median income of $39,301 versus $24,874 for females. The per capita income for the county was $17,082. About 16.4% of families and 21.3% of the population were below the poverty line, including 30.9% of those under age 18 and 12.5% of those age 65 or over.

=== 2000 census ===
As of the census of 2000, there were 47,579 people, 18,945 households, and 13,128 families living in the county. The population density was 72 people per square mile (28 people/km^{2}). There were 21,616 housing units at an average density of 33 per square mile (13/km^{2}). The racial makeup of the county was 92.74% White, 5.57% Black or African American, 0.27% Native American, 0.30% Asian, 0.04% Pacific Islander, 0.15% from other races, and 0.93% from two or more races. 0.68% of the population were Hispanic or Latino of any race.

There were 18,945 households, out of which 29.00% had children under the age of 18 living with them, 52.10% were married couples living together, 13.20% had a female householder with no husband present, and 30.70% were non-families. 26.90% of all households were made up of individuals, and 13.40% had someone living alone who was 65 years of age or older. The average household size was 2.41 and the average family size was 2.89.

In the county, the population was spread out, with 21.70% under the age of 18, 9.60% from 18 to 24, 27.10% from 25 to 44, 25.10% from 45 to 64, and 16.40% who were 65 years of age or older. The median age was 40 years. For every 100 females there were 98.20 males. For every 100 females age 18 and over, there were 94.70 males.

The median income for a household in the county was $24,788, and the median income for a family was $30,243. Males had a median income of $28,554 versus $18,317 for females. The per capita income for the county was $13,809. About 18.20% of families and 21.70% of the population were below the poverty line, including 31.90% of those under age 18 and 13.70% of those age 65 or over.

== Politics ==
Fayette County's political history is typical of West Virginia as a whole. The county leaned Democratic during the Third Party System before the power of industrial and mining political systems turned it strongly towards the Republican Party between 1880 and 1932. Unionization of its predominant coal mining workforce during the New Deal made the county powerfully Democratic between 1932 and 2008: no Republican in this period except Richard Nixon against George McGovern won forty percent of the county's vote, and Lyndon Johnson in 1964 exceeded eighty percent against the conservative Barry Goldwater. However, the decline of mining unions has produced a rapid swing to the Republican Party in the 21st century, with the Democratic vote share plummeting to less than 30% by 2024.

United States presidential election results for Fayette County, West Virginia
Year	Republican		Democratic		Third party(ies)	
Year	No.	%	No.	%	No.	%
1912	2,697	24.47%	3,757	34.09%	4,568	41.44%
1916	5,511	48.99%	5,377	47.80%	361	3.21%
1920	10,561	52.98%	9,003	45.16%	370	1.86%
1924	10,555	46.79%	9,563	42.39%	2,440	10.82%
1928	12,961	51.00%	12,351	48.60%	104	0.41%
1932	12,170	41.24%	17,127	58.04%	212	0.72%
1936	8,942	27.19%	23,864	72.57%	80	0.24%
1940	10,307	31.65%	22,256	68.35%	0	0.00%
1944	7,932	31.15%	17,529	68.85%	0	0.00%
1948	7,451	25.45%	21,707	74.14%	120	0.41%
1952	9,190	29.18%	22,307	70.82%	0	0.00%
1956	10,218	38.55%	16,286	61.45%	0	0.00%
1960	7,537	29.39%	18,109	70.61%	0	0.00%
1964	4,051	16.85%	19,990	83.15%	0	0.00%
1968	5,246	24.15%	14,546	66.96%	1,931	8.89%
1972	11,876	54.37%	9,966	45.63%	0	0.00%
1976	5,459	26.05%	15,496	73.95%	0	0.00%
1980	5,784	29.25%	13,175	66.63%	815	4.12%
1984	7,360	38.56%	11,650	61.04%	76	0.40%
1988	5,143	31.74%	11,009	67.94%	53	0.33%
1992	3,991	25.57%	9,574	61.34%	2,043	13.09%
1996	3,669	24.86%	9,471	64.18%	1,618	10.96%
2000	5,897	40.34%	8,371	57.26%	351	2.40%
2004	7,881	46.45%	8,971	52.87%	115	0.68%
2008	7,658	50.40%	7,242	47.66%	294	1.93%
2012	8,350	59.35%	5,419	38.51%	301	2.14%
2016	10,357	66.91%	4,290	27.72%	831	5.37%
2020	11,580	68.64%	5,063	30.01%	227	1.35%
2024	10,910	69.85%	4,387	28.09%	323	2.07%

== Economy ==
The county has a tradition of coal mining, which still serves as a primary source of employment in the area. A Georgia Pacific lumber mill has its home to the west of Mt. Hope, adjacent to U.S. Route 19. There exists a large metal alloy plant in Alloy. The Mount Olive Correctional Complex, West Virginia's only maximum security state prison, is also located in Fayette County. The economy has shifted significantly in recent years, with a large amount of money being spent in outdoor recreation and tourism.

== Health ==
Fayette County operates a public health department.

== Notable people ==
- George Cafego, All-American football player at University of Tennessee, first player selected in the 1940 NFL draft
- DJ Cheese, first DMC World DJ Champion (1986)
- Walt Craddock, former professional baseball player
- Bob Elkins, character actor
- Randy Gilkey, singer, songwriter, and music producer
- Tunney Hunsaker, professional boxer and former police chief
- Julia Neale Jackson, mother of Stonewall Jackson
- Harley M. Kilgore, former member of the United States Senate
- Jason Kincaid, professional wrestler, former NWA World Junior Heavyweight Champion
- John McClung, musician and performer of old-time music
- Charlie McCoy, musician and singer
- MacGillivray Milne, former governor of American Samoa
- Tom Pridemore, former safety from Ansted, West Virginia who played eight seasons in the NFL for the Atlanta Falcons and served one term as a legislator
- Timothy Truman, writer, artist, musician
- Nell W. Walker, state legislator and state banking commissioner
- Lonnie Warwick, professional football player

== Communities ==
=== Cities ===
- Montgomery (part)
- Mount Hope
- Oak Hill
- Smithers (part)

=== Towns ===
- Ansted
- Fayetteville (county seat)
- Gauley Bridge
- Meadow Bridge
- Pax
- Thurmond

=== Magisterial districts ===
- New Haven
- Plateau
- Valley

=== Census-designated places ===
- Beards Fork
- Boomer
- Charlton Heights
- Cunard
- Deep Water
- Dixie (part)
- Falls View
- Garten
- Gatewood
- Glen Ferris
- Glen Jean
- Hico
- Hilltop
- Kimberly
- Kincaid
- Mount Carbon
- Page
- Powellton
- Prince
- Scarbro

=== Unincorporated communities ===
- Agnew
- Alloy
- Alta
- Beckwith
- Boonesborough
- Brooklyn
- Brown
- Cannelton
- Caperton
- Carlisle
- Chimney Corner
- Clifftop
- Columbia
- Corliss
- Danese
- Dempsey
- Dothan
- Eagle
- Edmond
- Elkridge
- Fayette
- Greenstown
- Hamilton
- Harvey
- Hilton Village
- Hopewell
- Jodie
- Kanawha Falls
- Kingston
- Landisburg
- Lansing
- Layland
- Lochgelly
- Lookout
- McDunn
- McKendree
- Mahan
- Marvel
- Maywood
- Minden
- Montgomery Heights
- Mossy
- Nallen
- North Page
- Nuttall
- Nuttalburg
- Oak Ridge
- Ramsey
- Red Star
- Robson
- Russellville
- Sanger
- Smithers
- Toney Creek
- Victor
- Whipple
- Winona
- Wriston

== See also ==
- Babcock State Park
- Battle of Fayetteville (1862 Western Virginia)
- Beury Mountain Wildlife Management Area
- Bridge Day
- Coal camps in Fayette County, West Virginia
- Hawks Nest State Park
- Plum Orchard Lake Wildlife Management Area
- National Register of Historic Places listings in Fayette County, West Virginia
- Fayette County Schools (West Virginia)
