= List of census-designated places in West Virginia =

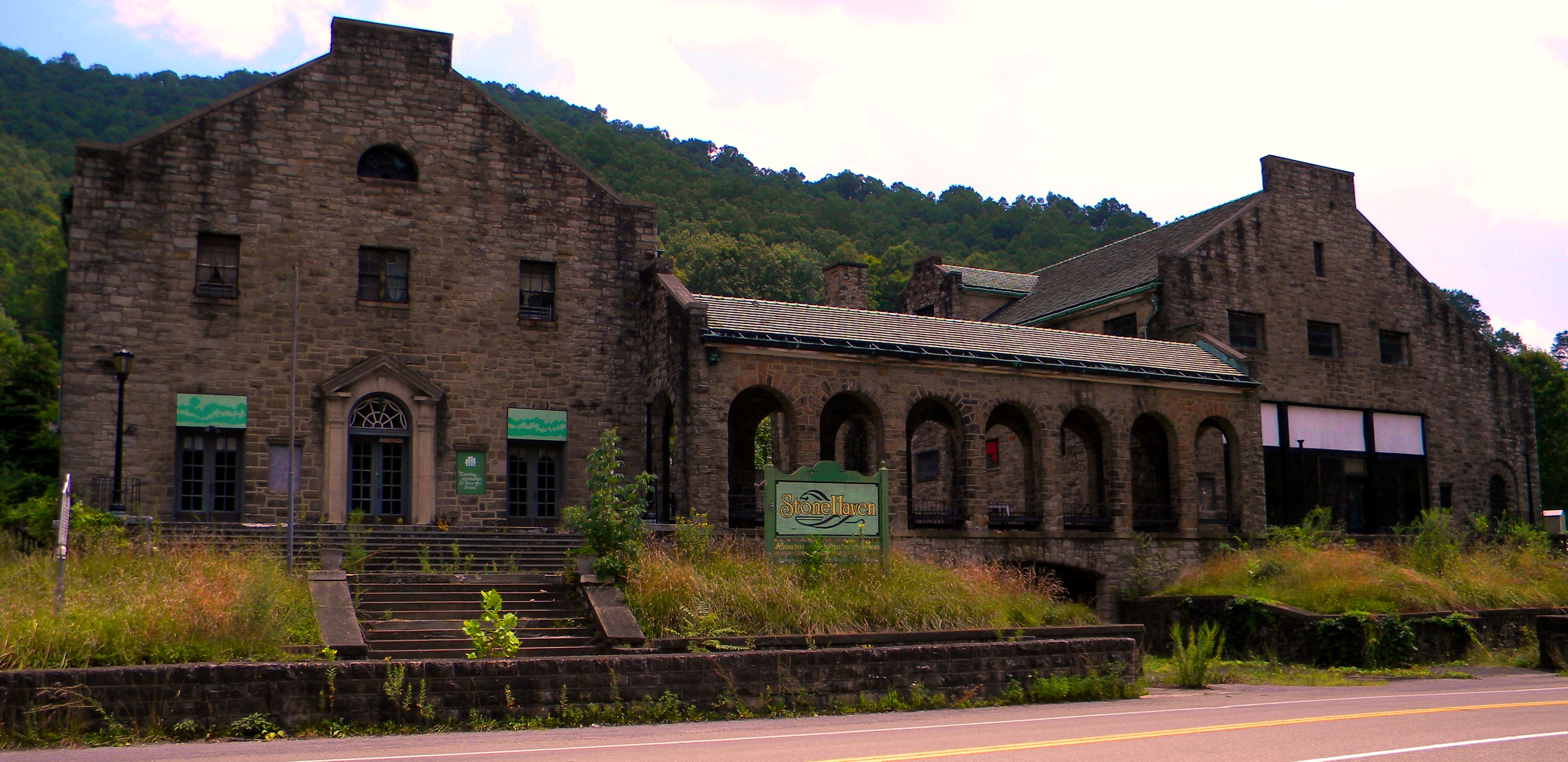
The Pocahontas Fuel Company owned the Itmann Company Store and Office (pictured), located in the company town of Itmann. Designed by Alex B. Mahood, the store was listed on the National Register of Historic Places in 1990. The town and store both take their names from Pocahontas Fuel president I. T. Mann.

The United States Census Bureau separates places by incorporation for statistical purposes during its decennial census. To incorporate, communities may need to meet statutory requirements made by their respective state, such as thresholds in population or specificities relative to location. (Note: Mississippi, for instance, only requires potential incorporated areas to have a population of 300, whereas Florida requires potential incorporated areas to have a population of at least 1,500 if the county in which the area resides has a population of 75,000 or less, or of at least 7,500 if the county in which the area resides has a population of more than 75,000.) Federally, the Census Bureau defines incorporated places as areas, whose boundaries do not cross state lines, that "provide governmental functions for a concentration of people", as opposed to "minor civil [divisions], which generally ... provide services or administer an area without regard, necessarily, to population". Unincorporated communities, classified as census-designated places (CDPs), lack elected municipal officers and boundaries with legal status. The Bureau identified 205 CDPs in the state of West Virginia at the 2020 census.

The Municipal Code of West Virginia, which governs incorporation, requires applicant municipal corporations (places for incorporation) that cover an area more than 1 square mile (2.6 km^{2}) to have a minimum of 500 inhabitants or freeholders per square mile, and those under 1 square mile to have at least 100 inhabitants or freeholders. Applicant areas must not reside within a municipality "urban in character", nor claim an area "disproportionate to its number of inhabitants". Upon approval, the state classifies municipal corporations as a Class I city, with a population of more than fifty thousand, a Class II city, with a population between ten thousand and fifty thousand, a Class III city, with a population between two thousand and ten thousand, or a Class IV town or village, with a population of less than two thousand. All municipalities can "use a common seal", defend, maintain, or institute a proceeding in court, and hold, take, purchase, or lease, as lessee, property for municipal purposes.

Of the fifty-five counties in West Virginia, Logan is home to the most CDPs, with twenty-five, followed by Fayette, with twenty, and Raleigh, with eighteen. The largest CDP by population is Teays Valley, with 14,350 residents, while Bowden, with 0 residents over 0.12 square miles (0.31 km^{2}), represents the state's smallest CDP by both population and area.

== Census-designated places ==
CDPs in West Virginia
Town	County(ies) (Note: If the CDP covers more than one county, the county that contains a majority of the CDP's population is listed first.)	2020 population	Total area in square miles (square kilometers)	Coordinates
Accoville	Logan	599	3.27 sq mi (8.5 km^{2})	37°46′7″N 81°50′13″W
Adrian	Upshur	120		38°54′19″N 80°16′32″W
Alum Creek	Lincoln; Kanawha	1,595	10.26 sq mi (26.6 km^{2})	38°16′45″N 81°49′32″W
Amherstdale	Logan	350	2.97 sq mi (7.7 km^{2})	37°47′7″N 81°48′33″W
Apple Grove	Mason	187	2.46 sq mi (6.4 km^{2})	38°39′54″N 82°10′9″W
Arobovale	Pocahontas	134		38°26′07″N 79°49′03″W
Arthurdale	Preston	755		39°29′42″N 79°48′54″W
Aurora	Preston	200	2.11 sq mi (5.5 km^{2})	39°19′27″N 79°33′16″W
Bartley	McDowell	146	1.16 sq mi (3.0 km^{2})	37°20′26″N 81°44′15″W
Bartow	Pocahontas	64	0.46 sq mi (1.2 km^{2})	38°32′28″N 79°47′3″W
Baxter	Marion	153		39°32′38″N 80°8′32″W
Beards Fork	Fayette	127	1.68 sq mi (4.4 km^{2})	38°3′49″N 81°13′38″W
Beaver	Raleigh	1,129	4.39 sq mi (11.4 km^{2})	37°44′51″N 81°8′31″W
Belva	Nicholas	78	0.16 sq mi (0.41 km^{2})	38°13′50″N 81°11′37″W
Bergoo	Webster	64	0.22 sq mi (0.57 km^{2})	38°29′11″N 80°18′2″W
Berwind	McDowell	188	0.30 sq mi (0.78 km^{2})	37°16′7″N 81°40′0″W
Big Chimney	Kanawha	629	2.06 sq mi (5.3 km^{2})	38°24′20″N 81°32′8″W
Big Creek	Logan	195	0.58 sq mi (1.5 km^{2})	38°0′15″N 82°2′24″W
Big Sandy	McDowell	198	0.55 sq mi (1.4 km^{2})	37°27′51″N 81°41′53″W
Birch River	Nicholas	86	0.38 sq mi (0.98 km^{2})	38°29′57″N 80°45′13″W
Blennerhassett	Wood	3,118	4.99 sq mi (12.9 km^{2})	39°15′15″N 81°37′25″W
Bluewell	Mercer	2,162	4.52 sq mi (11.7 km^{2})	37°18′45″N 81°15′35″W
Boaz	Wood	1,321	4.48 sq mi (11.6 km^{2})	39°22′5″N 81°29′24″W
Bolt	Raleigh	518	5.45 sq mi (14.1 km^{2})	37°45′44″N 81°24′44″W
Boomer	Fayette	599	1.48 sq mi (3.8 km^{2})	38°9′2″N 81°17′14″W
Booth	Monongalia	156		39°35′49″N 80°00′55″W
Bowden	Randolph	0	0.12 sq mi (0.31 km^{2})	38°54′31″N 79°42′35″W
Bradley	Raleigh	1,928	4.24 sq mi (11.0 km^{2})	37°52′35″N 81°12′12″W
Brandywine	Pendleton	178	0.49 sq mi (1.3 km^{2})	38°37′19″N 79°14′29″W
Brenton	Wyoming	194	0.64 sq mi (1.7 km^{2})	37°35′46″N 81°38′9″W
Brookhaven	Monongalia	5,707	9.28 sq mi (24.0 km^{2})	39°36′38″N 79°54′0″W
Bruno	Logan	483	1.32 sq mi (3.4 km^{2})	37°41′26″N 81°52′8″W
Brush Fork	Mercer	1,065	1.90 sq mi (4.9 km^{2})	37°16′51″N 81°15′21″W
Bud	Wyoming	347	3.15 sq mi (8.2 km^{2})	37°32′10″N 81°22′47″W
Burlington	Mineral	131	1.23 sq mi (3.2 km^{2})	39°20′15″N 78°55′5″W
Carolina	Marion	390	0.83 sq mi (2.1 km^{2})	39°28′49″N 80°16′24″W
Cass	Pocahontas	38	0.79 sq mi (2.0 km^{2})	38°23′48″N 79°54′53″W
Cassville	Monongalia	900	3.55 sq mi (9.2 km^{2})	39°39′43″N 80°3′3″W
Century	Barbour	111	0.13 sq mi (0.34 km^{2})	39°5′59″N 80°11′19″W
Charlton Heights	Fayette	307	0.49 sq mi (1.3 km^{2})	38°7′25″N 81°14′2″W
Chattaroy	Mingo	641	2.04 sq mi (5.3 km^{2})	37°42′8″N 82°17′1″W
Chauncey	Logan	234	1.45 sq mi (3.8 km^{2})	37°45′58″N 81°59′15″W
Cheat Lake	Monongalia	9,930	15.83 sq mi (41.0 km^{2})	39°40′0″N 79°51′10″W
Chelyan	Kanawha	681	0.43 sq mi (1.1 km^{2})	38°11′43″N 81°29′27″W
Clifton	Mason	392		39°00′08″N 82°02′30″W
Coal City	Raleigh	1,689	6.31 sq mi (16.3 km^{2})	37°41′8″N 81°12′37″W
Coal Fork	Kanawha	1,039	5.15 sq mi (13.3 km^{2})	38°19′2″N 81°31′37″W
Colcord	Raleigh	103		37°56′42″N 81°26′15″W
Colliers	Brooke	15		40°22′1″N 80°32′28″W
Comfort	Boone	320	1.00 sq mi (2.6 km^{2})	38°7′49″N 81°36′56″W
Corinne	Wyoming	318	0.39 sq mi (1.0 km^{2})	37°34′36″N 81°21′14″W
Cottageville	Jackson	257		38°51′56″N 81°49′24″W
Covel	Wyoming	85	0.21 sq mi (0.54 km^{2})	37°29′19″N 81°19′24″W
Crab Orchard	Raleigh	2,416	2.24 sq mi (5.8 km^{2})	37°44′27″N 81°13′46″W
Craigsville	Nicholas	2,173	6.09 sq mi (15.8 km^{2})	38°20′0″N 80°38′34″W
Crooked Creek	Logan	273		37°52′55″N 81°58′52″W
Cross Lanes	Kanawha	9,727	6.42 sq mi (16.6 km^{2})	38°25′45″N 81°46′33″W
Crum	Wayne	136	0.51 sq mi (1.3 km^{2})	37°54′20″N 82°26′46″W
Crumpler	McDowell	151	1.50 sq mi (3.9 km^{2})	37°25′29″N 81°20′30″W
Cucumber	McDowell	74	0.45 sq mi (1.2 km^{2})	37°16′40″N 81°37′36″W
Culloden	Cabell; Putnam	3,016	4.23 sq mi (11.0 km^{2})	38°25′6″N 82°4′4″W
Cunard	Fayette	98		37°59′55″N 81°02′22″W
Dailey	Randolph	106	0.51 sq mi (1.3 km^{2})	38°47′55″N 79°53′46″W
Daniels	Raleigh	1,654	4.64 sq mi (12.0 km^{2})	37°44′23″N 81°7′29″W
Deep Water	Fayette	183	0.99 sq mi (2.6 km^{2})	38°7′36″N 81°15′49″W
Despard	Harrison	794	1.47 sq mi (3.8 km^{2})	39°16′57″N 80°18′48″W
Dixie	Nicholas; Fayette	227	0.73 sq mi (1.9 km^{2})	38°15′3″N 81°11′35″W
Dorothy	Raleigh	112		37°57′21″N 81°27′02″W
Dupont City	Kanawha	455		38°16′10″N 81°33′55″W
Earling	Logan	76	0.19 sq mi (0.49 km^{2})	37°45′59″N 81°54′55″W
East Dailey	Randolph	469	1.05 sq mi (2.7 km^{2})	38°46′49″N 79°53′27″W
East View	Harrison	817	1.02 sq mi (2.6 km^{2})	39°16′5″N 80°18′40″W
Eccles	Raleigh	334	0.69 sq mi (1.8 km^{2})	37°46′59″N 81°15′57″W
Elkview	Kanawha	1,116	1.75 sq mi (4.5 km^{2})	38°26′16″N 81°28′55″W
Enterprise	Harrison	805	2.94 sq mi (7.6 km^{2})	39°25′11″N 80°16′36″W
Eskdale	Kanawha	283		38°05′28″N 81°26′37″W
Fairlea	Greenbrier	1,720	3.74 sq mi (9.7 km^{2})	37°46′48″N 80°27′31″W
Falling Waters	Berkeley	1,440	1.25 sq mi (3.2 km^{2})	39°33′33″N 77°53′27″W
Falls View	Fayette	193	0.41 sq mi (1.1 km^{2})	38°7′34″N 81°14′46″W
Fenwick	Nicholas	69	0.15 sq mi (0.39 km^{2})	38°13′43″N 80°34′56″W
Fort Ashby	Mineral	1,289	3.57 sq mi (9.2 km^{2})	39°29′52″N 78°46′4″W
Frank	Pocahontas	79	0.38 sq mi (0.98 km^{2})	38°32′54″N 79°48′20″W
Gallipolis Ferry	Mason	735	2.77 sq mi (7.2 km^{2})	38°46′14″N 82°11′56″W
Galloway	Barbour	127	0.63 sq mi (1.6 km^{2})	39°13′54″N 80°7′45″W
Garten	Fayette	204		38°2′4″N 81°4′36″W
Gatewood	Fayette	390		
Ghent	Raleigh	582	1.61 sq mi (4.2 km^{2})	37°37′1″N 81°6′53″W
Gilbert Creek	Mingo	1,136	11.57 sq mi (30.0 km^{2})	37°34′56″N 81°54′7″W
Glen Ferris	Fayette	174	1.63 sq mi (4.2 km^{2})	38°9′11″N 81°12′53″W
Glen Fork	Wyoming	457	3.09 sq mi (8.0 km^{2})	37°41′48″N 81°31′46″W
Glen Jean	Fayette	90	0.23 sq mi (0.60 km^{2})	37°55′35″N 81°9′0″W
Glen White	Raleigh	245	0.51 sq mi (1.3 km^{2})	37°43′49″N 81°16′47″W
Great Cacapon	Morgan	315	0.86 sq mi (2.2 km^{2})	39°37′10″N 78°17′22″W
Green Bank	Pocahontas	141	3.28 sq mi (8.5 km^{2})	38°25′12″N 79°49′53″W
Green Spring	Hampshire	250	2.20 sq mi (5.7 km^{2})	39°31′54″N 78°36′59″W
Greenview	Boone	333	1.02 sq mi (2.6 km^{2})	37°59′39″N 81°48′56″W
Greenville	Logan	243	0.16 sq mi (0.41 km^{2})	37°43′15″N 81°52′18″W
Gypsy	Harrison	197	0.78 sq mi (2.0 km^{2})	39°22′7″N 80°19′4″W
Harts	Lincoln	573	9.31 sq mi (24.1 km^{2})	38°1′50″N 82°7′41″W
Helen	Raleigh	137	0.24 sq mi (0.62 km^{2})	37°38′5″N 81°18′50″W
Helvetia	Randolph	38	1.81 sq mi (4.7 km^{2})	38°42′21″N 80°12′4″W
Henlawson	Logan	353	0.83 sq mi (2.1 km^{2})	37°54′8″N 81°59′17″W
Hepzibah	Harrison	387	0.92 sq mi (2.4 km^{2})	39°19′57″N 80°20′7″W
Hico	Fayette	239	5.02 sq mi (13.0 km^{2})	38°7′2″N 81°0′20″W
Hilltop	Fayette	528	0.65 sq mi (1.7 km^{2})	37°56′34″N 81°9′3″W
Hinkleville	Upshur	317		38°55′36″N 80°15′44″W
Holden	Logan	783	3.73 sq mi (9.7 km^{2})	37°49′7″N 82°3′42″W
Hollygrove	Kanawha	104		38°11′25″N 81°23′45″W
Hometown	Putnam	556	0.80 sq mi (2.1 km^{2})	38°31′58″N 81°51′40″W
Hooverson Heights	Brooke	2,582	2.31 sq mi (6.0 km^{2})	40°19′22″N 80°34′57″W
Huntersville	Pocahontas	68	1.13 sq mi (2.9 km^{2})	38°11′19″N 80°0′58″W
Idamay	Marion	542	0.88 sq mi (2.3 km^{2})	39°29′49″N 80°15′25″W
Institute	Kanawha	690		38°23′1″N 81°45′55″W
Inwood	Berkeley	3,426	2.85 sq mi (7.4 km^{2})	39°21′12″N 78°2′56″W
Itmann	Wyoming	259	1.01 sq mi (2.6 km^{2})	37°34′23″N 81°25′5″W
Jacksonburg	Wetzel	114	1.50 sq mi (3.9 km^{2})	39°31′56″N 80°38′30″W
Jefferson	Kanawha	527	0.55 sq mi (1.4 km^{2})	38°22′27″N 81°46′43″W
Justice	Mingo	313	1.38 sq mi (3.6 km^{2})	37°35′19″N 81°50′7″W
Justice Addition	Logan	331	0.12 sq mi (0.31 km^{2})	37°53′33″N 81°59′34″W
Kanawha	Wood	130		39°11′56″N 81°27′36″W
Kimberly	Fayette	213	0.89 sq mi (2.3 km^{2})	38°8′8″N 81°18′9″W
Kincaid	Fayette	191	0.87 sq mi (2.3 km^{2})	38°2′26″N 81°16′12″W
Kistler	Logan	420	1.49 sq mi (3.9 km^{2})	37°45′22″N 81°51′36″W
Kopperston	Wyoming	569	1.92 sq mi (5.0 km^{2})	37°44′59″N 81°34′3″W
Lashmeet	Mercer	409	0.75 sq mi (1.9 km^{2})	37°25′15″N 81°11′57″W
Lavalette	Wayne	932	2.61 sq mi (6.8 km^{2})	38°19′22″N 82°26′49″W
Lesage	Cabell	1,290	7.23 sq mi (18.7 km^{2})	38°30′23″N 82°17′55″W
Littleton	Wetzel	103	0.67 sq mi (1.7 km^{2})	39°42′5″N 80°30′57″W
Lubeck	Wood	1,309	4.26 sq mi (11.0 km^{2})	39°13′58″N 81°38′22″W
MacArthur	Raleigh	1,376	3.00 sq mi (7.8 km^{2})	37°45′26″N 81°12′40″W
Malden	Kanawha	298		38°18′02″N 81°33′25″W
Mallory	Logan	1,552	0.34 sq mi (0.88 km^{2})	37°43′49″N 81°50′9″W
Matheny	Wyoming	446	3.52 sq mi (9.1 km^{2})	37°39′54″N 81°36′0″W
Matoaka	Mercer	173	0.26 sq mi (0.67 km^{2})	37°25′12″N 81°14′35″W
Maybeury	McDowell	109	1.67 sq mi (4.3 km^{2})	37°22′15″N 81°21′59″W
McConnell	Logan	412	0.34 sq mi (0.88 km^{2})	37°49′32″N 81°58′0″W
Middleway	Jefferson	403	1.12 sq mi (2.9 km^{2})	39°18′12″N 77°58′58″W
Mineralwells	Wood	1,805	1.55 sq mi (4.0 km^{2})	39°10′44″N 81°30′37″W
Monaville	Logan	302	0.46 sq mi (1.2 km^{2})	37°48′43″N 81°59′41″W
Montcalm	Mercer	575	2.74 sq mi (7.1 km^{2})	37°21′16″N 81°15′3″W
Mount Carbon	Fayette	341	0.24 sq mi (0.62 km^{2})	38°8′16″N 81°17′8″W
Mount Gay-Shamrock	Logan	1,440	7.56 sq mi (19.6 km^{2})	37°50′50″N 82°1′47″W
Neibert	Logan	205	0.63 sq mi (1.6 km^{2})	37°47′17″N 81°56′30″W
Nettie	Nicholas	291	3.15 sq mi (8.2 km^{2})	38°13′27″N 80°41′9″W
Newark	Wirt	424		39°7′8″N 81°23′51″W
Newell	Hancock	1,203	0.94 sq mi (2.4 km^{2})	40°37′3″N 80°36′3″W
New Richmond	Wyoming	193	0.45 sq mi (1.2 km^{2})	37°34′12″N 81°29′20″W
Omar	Logan	416	1.14 sq mi (3.0 km^{2})	37°45′20″N 81°59′58″W
Osage	Monongalia	26		39°39′31″N 80°00′27″W
Page	Fayette	152	0.44 sq mi (1.1 km^{2})	38°3′10″N 81°16′11″W
Pageton	McDowell	174	1.22 sq mi (3.2 km^{2})	37°20′57″N 81°27′55″W
Parcoal	Webster	130		38°27′33″N 80°22′24″W
Pea Ridge	Cabell	7,188	2.35 sq mi (6.1 km^{2})	38°24′56″N 82°19′17″W
Peach Creek	Logan	185	0.25 sq mi (0.65 km^{2})	37°52′28″N 81°59′05″W
Pentress	Monongalia	135	0.61 sq mi (1.6 km^{2})	39°42′37″N 80°9′37″W
Pickens	Randolph	41	2.03 sq mi (5.3 km^{2})	38°39′18″N 80°12′42″W
Pinch	Kanawha	2,914	3.59 sq mi (9.3 km^{2})	38°24′23″N 81°29′5″W
Piney View	Raleigh	902	4.08 sq mi (10.6 km^{2})	37°50′58″N 81°8′43″W
Powellton	Fayette	493	5.35 sq mi (13.9 km^{2})	38°6′27″N 81°19′15″W
Prichard	Wayne	461	1.26 sq mi (3.3 km^{2})	38°14′24″N 82°35′55″W
Prince	Fayette	115	2.02 sq mi (5.2 km^{2})	37°51′32″N 81°3′13″W
Prosperity	Raleigh	1,345	2.46 sq mi (6.4 km^{2})	37°50′9″N 81°12′21″W
Rachel	Marion	224	0.35 sq mi (0.91 km^{2})	39°31′6″N 80°18′13″W
Racine	Boone	267	0.51 sq mi (1.3 km^{2})	38°8′31″N 81°39′37″W
Raleigh	Raleigh	168		37°45′27″N 81°10′11″W
Rand	Kanawha	1,543	0.46 sq mi (1.2 km^{2})	38°16′57″N 81°33′44″W
Raymond City	Putnam	116		38°28′52″N 81°48′56″W
Raysal	McDowell	364	1.24 sq mi (3.2 km^{2})	37°20′35″N 81°46′56″W
Reader	Wetzel	278	0.95 sq mi (2.5 km^{2})	39°34′8″N 80°43′58″W
Red Jacket	Mingo	525	5.26 sq mi (13.6 km^{2})	37°38′50″N 82°8′16″W
Reynoldsville	Harrison	339		39°17′18″N 80°26′05″W
Robinette	Logan	567	3.02 sq mi (7.8 km^{2})	37°47′6″N 81°47′37″W
Rock Cave	Upshur	364		38°50′12″N 80°20′33″W
Roderfield	McDowell	62	0.28 sq mi (0.73 km^{2})	37°27′1″N 81°42′20″W
Rossmore	Logan	241	0.63 sq mi (1.6 km^{2})	37°48′33″N 81°58′52″W
Salt Rock	Cabell	373	3.14 sq mi (8.1 km^{2})	38°19′23″N 82°13′16″W
Sarah Ann	Logan	207	1.83 sq mi (4.7 km^{2})	37°42′40″N 81°59′14″W
Scarbro	Fayette	461	0.68 sq mi (1.8 km^{2})	37°57′11″N 81°9′56″W
Shady Spring	Raleigh	3,169	6.14 sq mi (15.9 km^{2})	37°42′13″N 81°5′27″W
Shannondale	Jefferson	3,487	8.74 sq mi (22.6 km^{2})	39°13′1″N 77°48′27″W
Shenandoah Junction	Jefferson	635	1.01 sq mi (2.6 km^{2})	39°21′31″N 77°50′35″W
Shrewsbury	Kanawha	517	0.44 sq mi (1.1 km^{2})	38°12′22″N 81°28′17″W
Sissonville	Kanawha	4,084	12.84 sq mi (33.3 km^{2})	38°30′17″N 81°38′43″W
Spelter	Harrison	244	0.49 sq mi (1.3 km^{2})	39°20′42″N 80°19′4″W
Springfield	Hampshire	455	1.34 sq mi (3.5 km^{2})	39°27′2″N 78°41′37″W
Stanaford	Raleigh	1,215	1.92 sq mi (5.0 km^{2})	37°49′17″N 81°9′5″W
St. George	Tucker	74		39°10′000″N 79°42′08″W
Stollings	Logan	310	0.38 sq mi (0.98 km^{2})	37°50′15″N 81°57′52″W
Switzer	Logan	593	2.36 sq mi (6.1 km^{2})	37°47′37″N 81°59′15″W
Teays Valley	Putnam	14,350	7.27 sq mi (18.8 km^{2})	38°26′50″N 81°56′14″W
Tioga	Nicholas	79	0.62 sq mi (1.6 km^{2})	38°25′13″N 80°39′21″W
Tornado	Kanawha	1,081	3.67 sq mi (9.5 km^{2})	38°20′34″N 81°50′39″W
Twilight	Boone	74	0.50 sq mi (1.3 km^{2})	37°55′38″N 81°37′24″W
Valley Bend	Randolph	470	1.41 sq mi (3.7 km^{2})	38°46′18″N 79°55′31″W
Valley Head	Randolph	207	0.98 sq mi (2.5 km^{2})	38°32′42″N 80°2′9″W
Van	Boone	177	0.61 sq mi (1.6 km^{2})	37°58′16″N 81°42′39″W
Verdunville	Logan	491	2.67 sq mi (6.9 km^{2})	37°50′40″N 82°3′18″W
Vivian	McDowell	85	0.36 sq mi (0.93 km^{2})	37°25′5″N 81°29′14″W
Wallace	Harrison	201	1.42 sq mi (3.7 km^{2})	39°24′34″N 80°29′23″W
Washington	Wood	1,151	4.38 sq mi (11.3 km^{2})	39°14′17″N 81°40′14″W
Waverly	Wood	369	1.48 sq mi (3.8 km^{2})	39°20′10″N 81°22′34″W
West Dunbar	Kanawha	617	0.24 sq mi (0.62 km^{2})	38°22′23″N 81°45′19″W
Whitmer	Randolph	94	0.42 sq mi (1.1 km^{2})	38°48′46″N 79°32′56″W
Wiley Ford	Mineral	906	2.88 sq mi (7.5 km^{2})	39°36′58″N 78°46′30″W
Wolf Summit	Harrison	214	0.36 sq mi (0.93 km^{2})	39°16′51″N 80°27′39″W

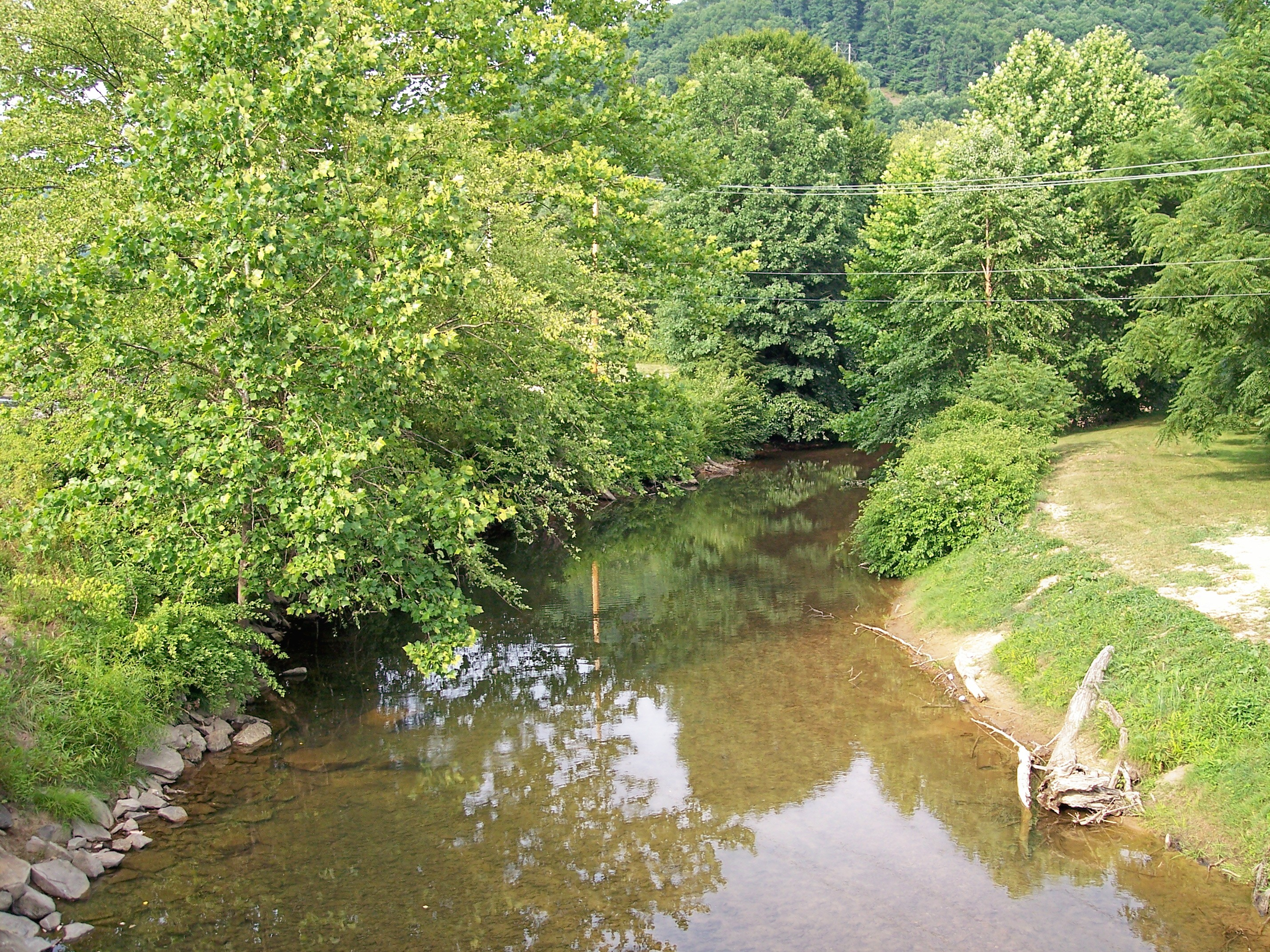
The Birch River, located in the town of the same name, is a tributary of the Elk River.

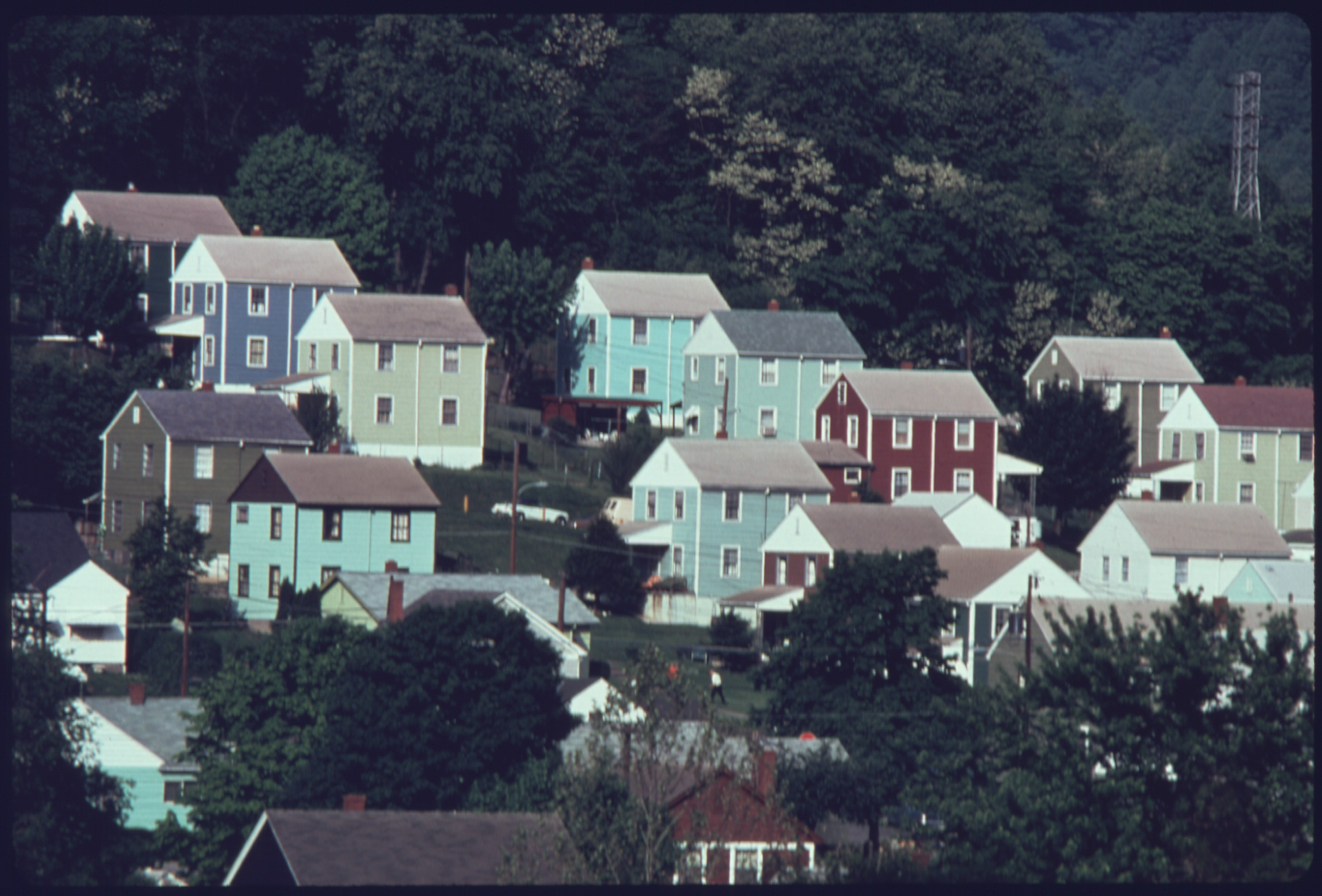
The houses of Boomer, as seen from across the Kanawha River in May 1975

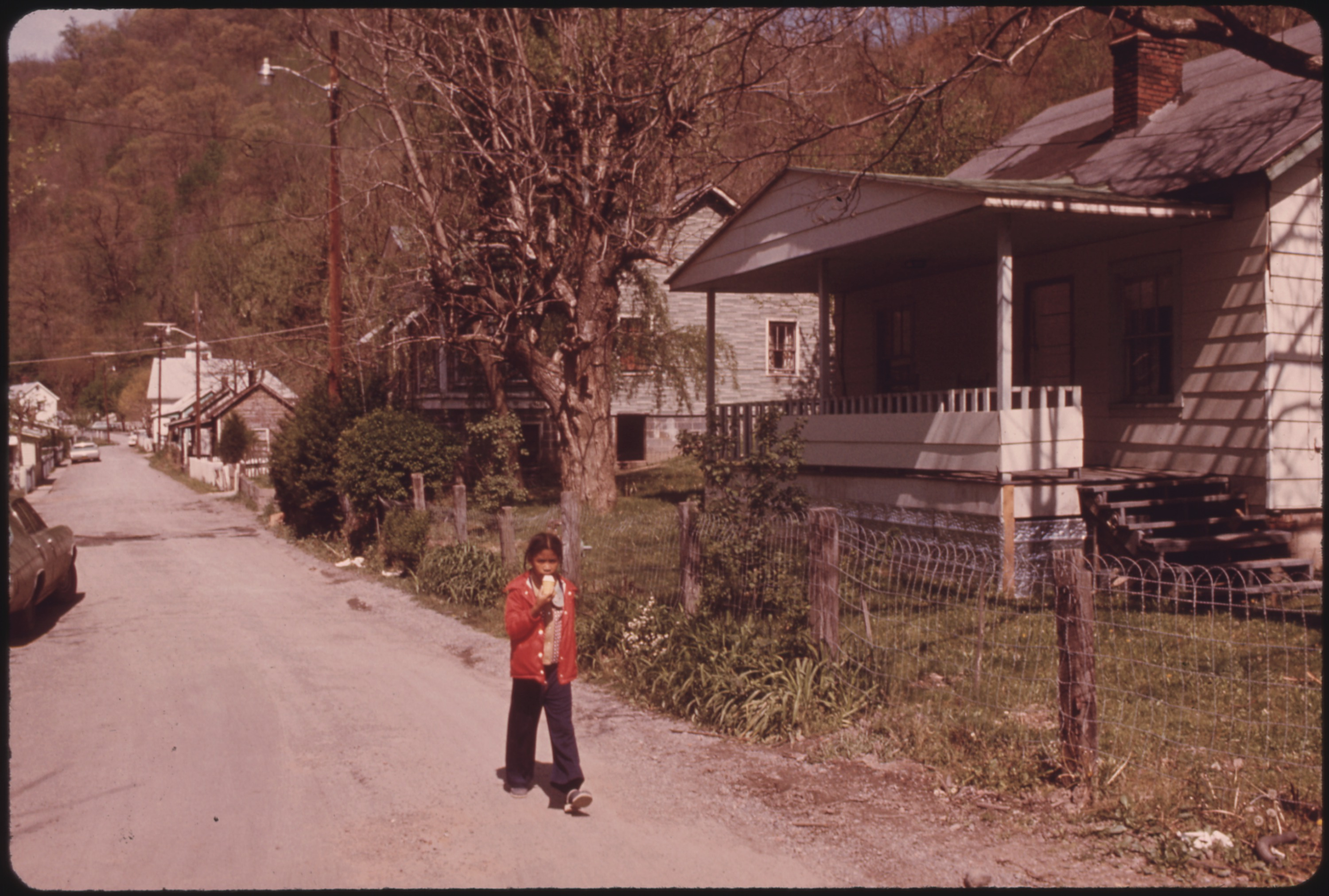
A child returning to school with an ice cream cone in Chattaroy. Photographed as a part of the DOCUMERICA series, which aimed to "photographically document subjects of environmental concern", the image's title states that Chattaroy "[had] no industry" and that "most of the people [survived] on welfare, pensions, Social Security, and black lung benefits" in April 1974.

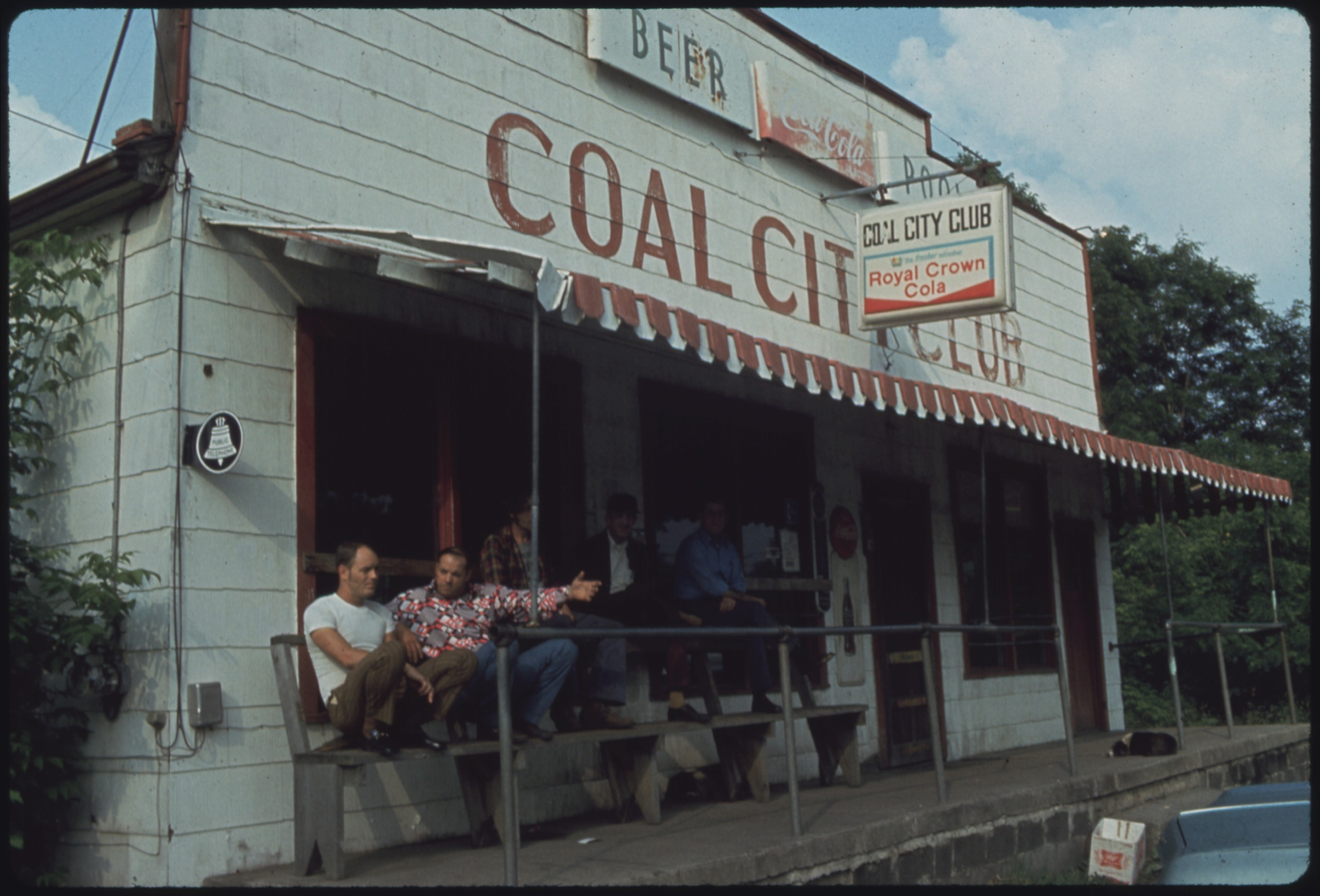
The Coal City Club in Coal City, pictured in June 1974; some miners outside were "hunkering down", a "familiar stance to all miners who use this posture in the mine shafts which have low ceilings".

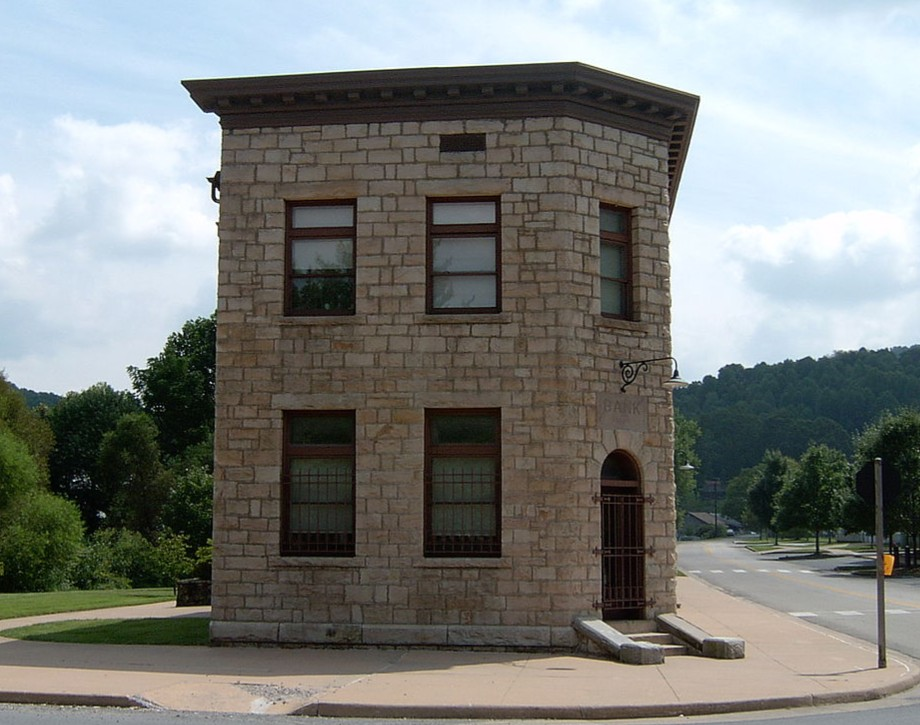
The Bank of Glen Jean in the town of the same name was constructed in 1909.

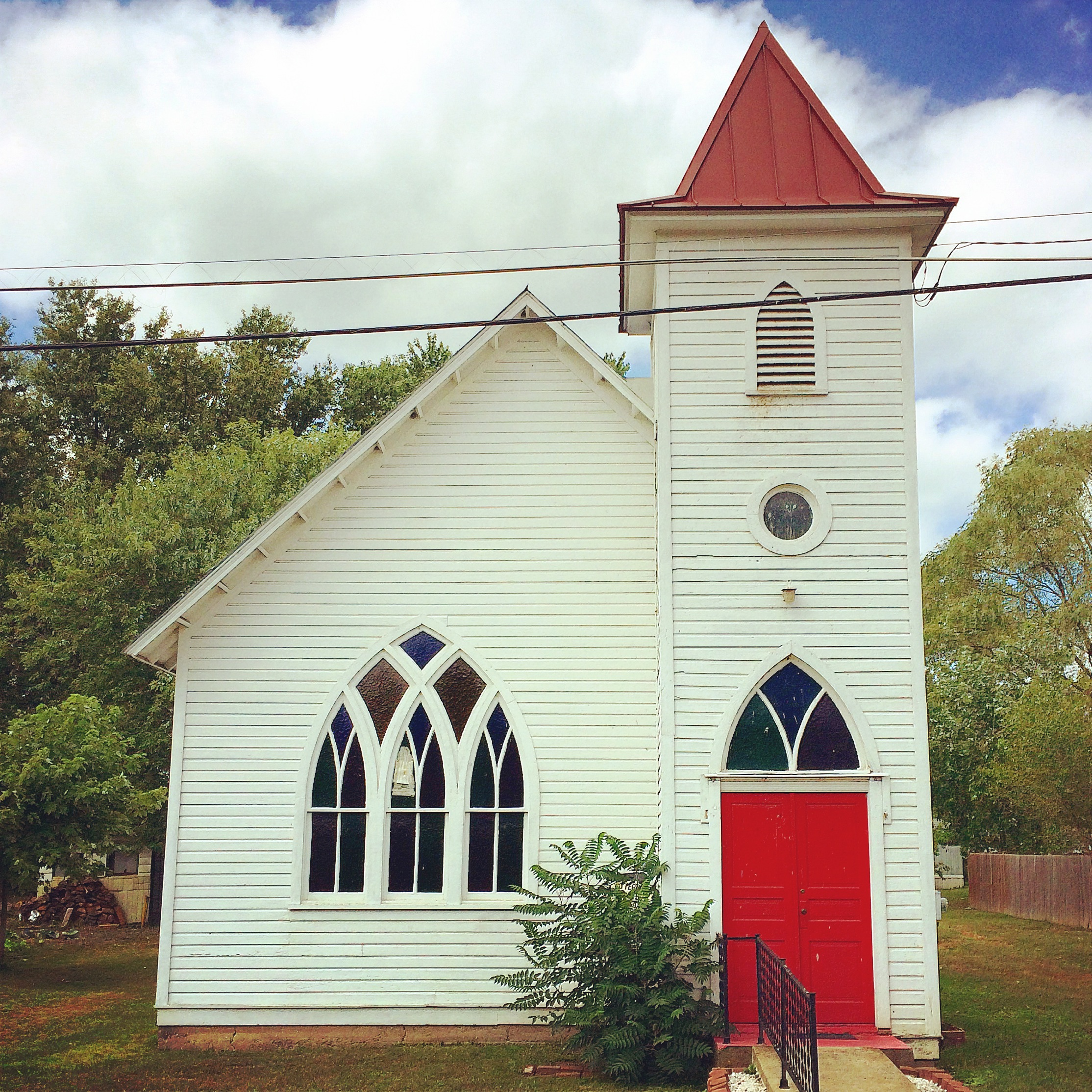
Otterbein United Methodist Church in Green Spring

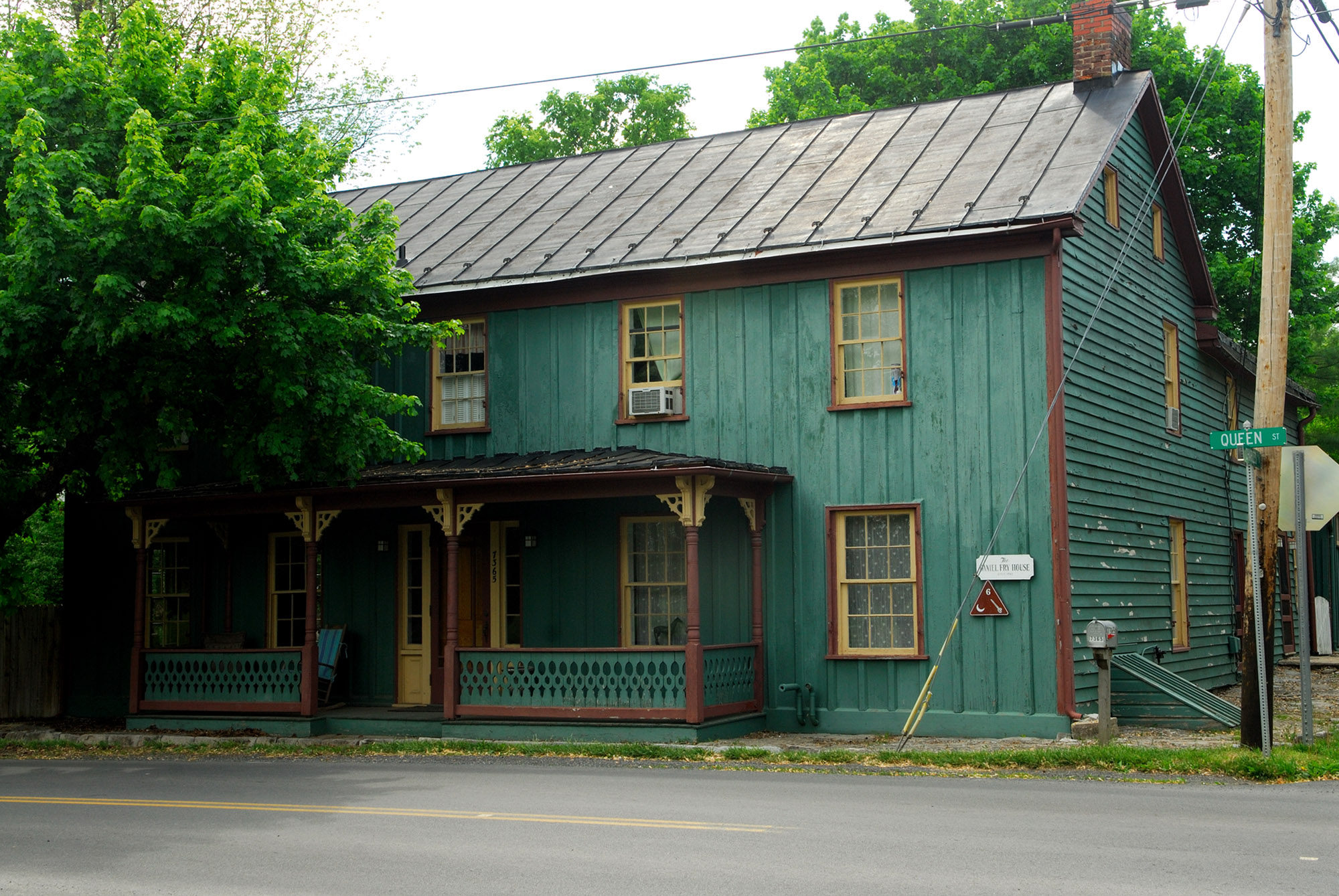
The Daniel Fry House in Middleway

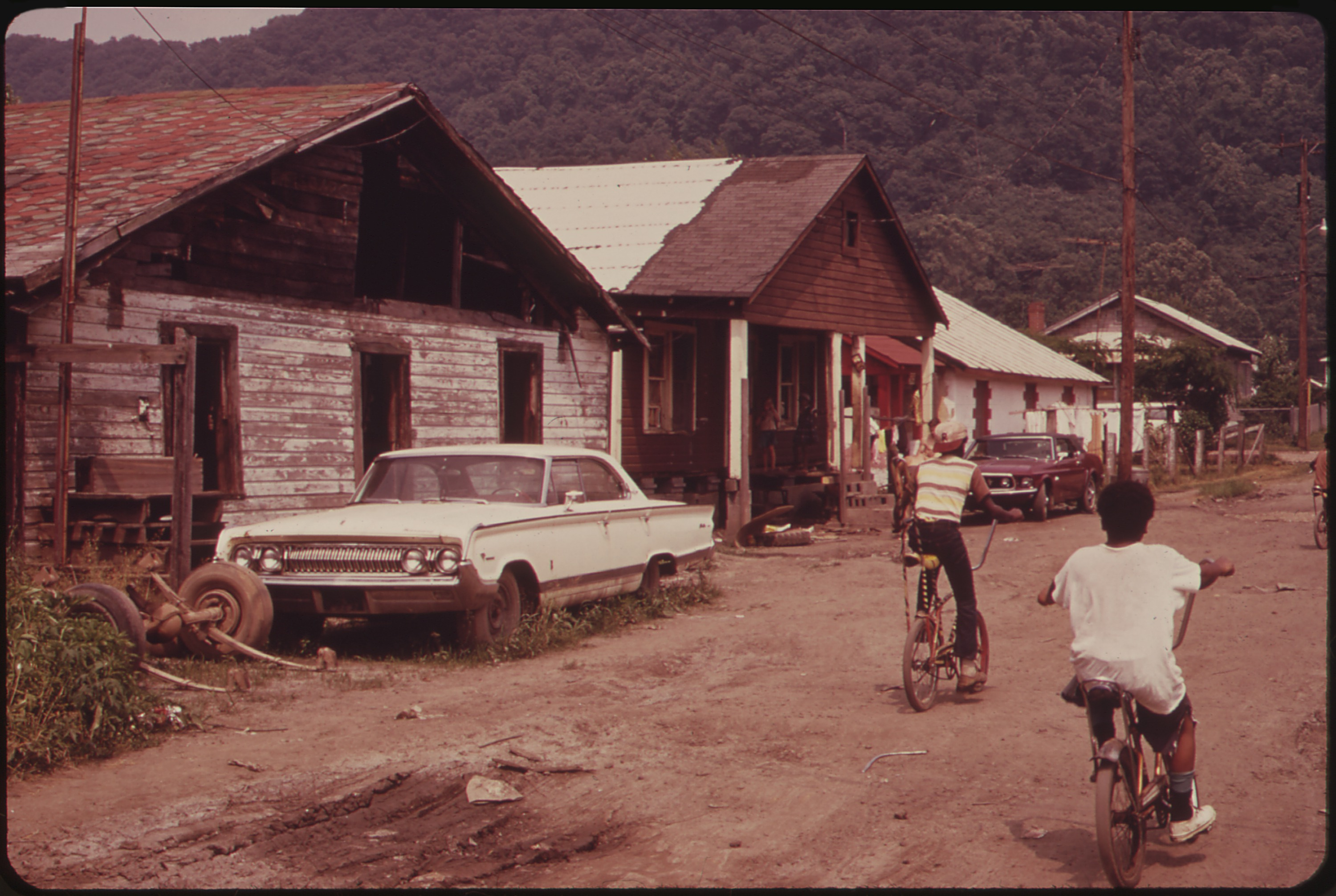
A DOCUMERICA image of Rand, with "much of its population living in poverty" in June 1973

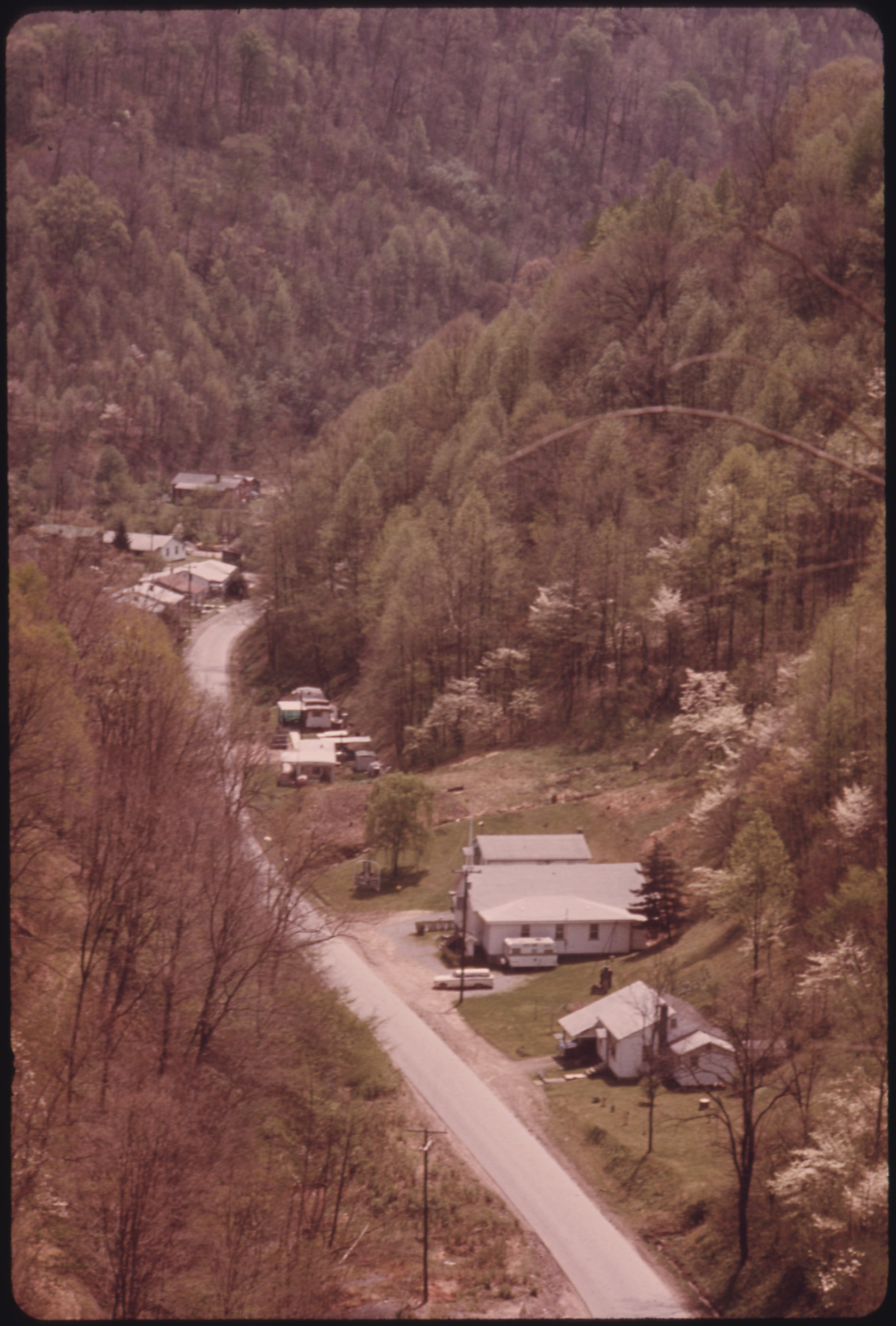
The Red Jacket Consolidated Coal and Coke Company constructed Red Jacket (pictured) in 1905.

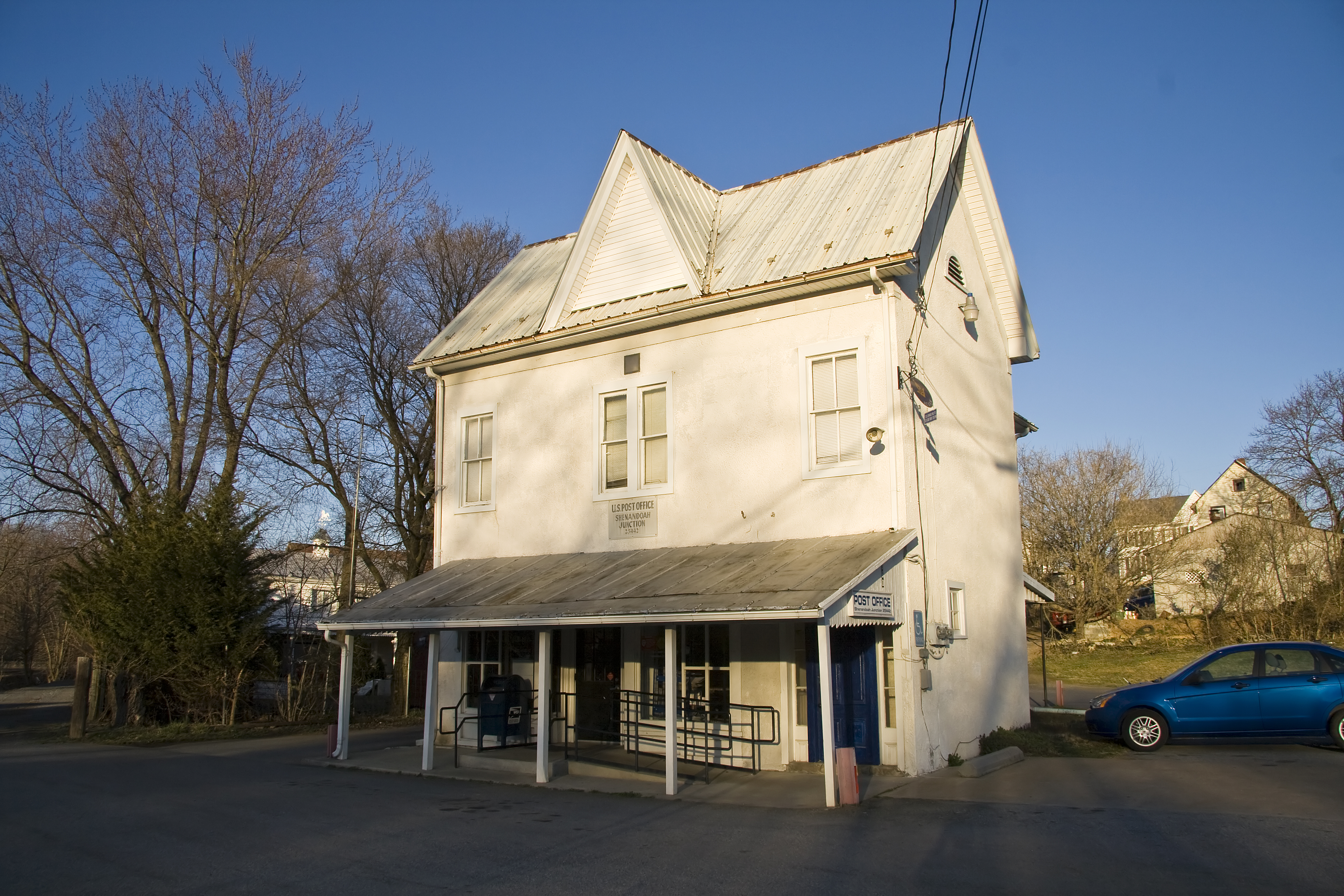
A post office in Shenandoah Junction

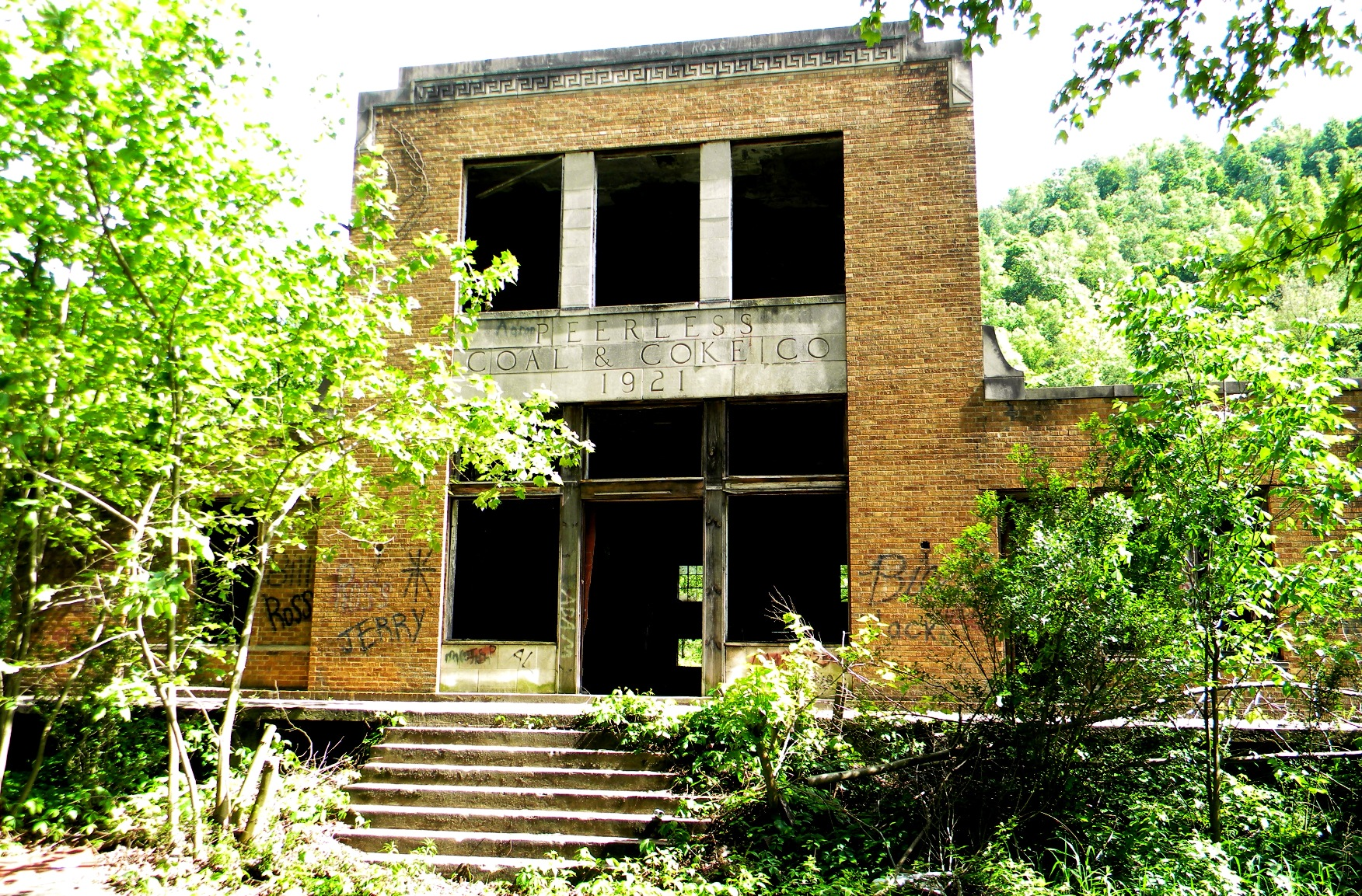
The Peerless Coal Company Store in Vivian was listed on the National Register of Historic Places in 1992.

== See also ==
- List of municipalities in West Virginia
