= Chattaroy =

Chattaroy may refer to:

- Chattaroy, Washington
- Chattaroy, West Virginia
