= West Virginia Route 17 =

State highway in West Virginia, United States

West Virginia Route 17

Route information
- Maintained by WVDOH
- Length: 30.4 mi (48.9 km)

Major junctions
- South end: WV 10 in Stollings
- North end: WV 85 in Madison

Location
- Country: United States
- State: West Virginia
- Counties: Logan, Boone

Highway system
- West Virginia State Highway System; Interstate; US; State
← WV 16	→ WV 18

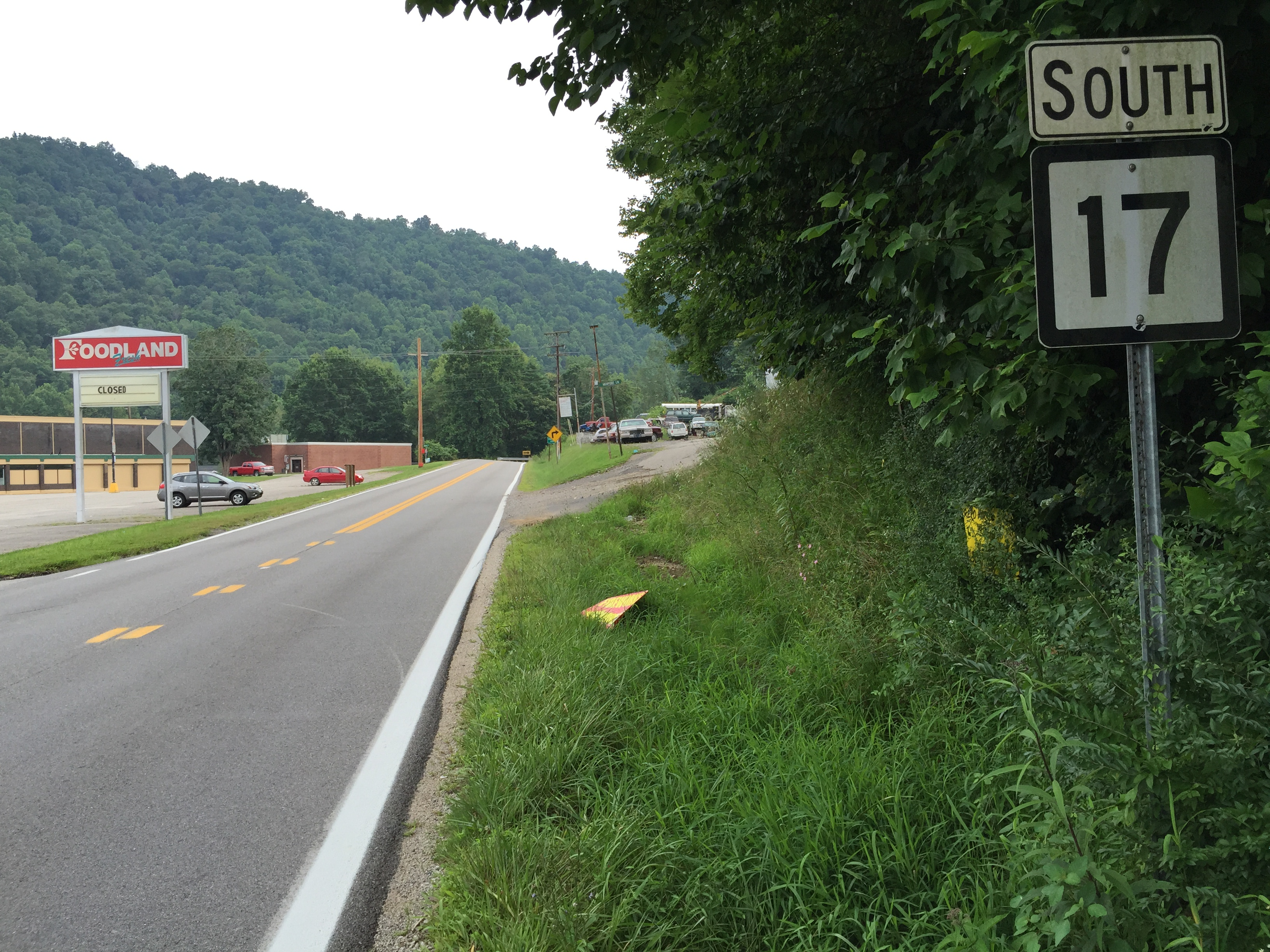
View south along WV 17 in Madison

West Virginia Route 17 is a north-south state highway located in the southern portion of the U.S. state of West Virginia. The southern terminus of the route is at West Virginia Route 10 in Stollings a short distance east of Logan. The northern terminus is at West Virginia Route 85 in Madison.

== History ==
The current alignment of WV 17 was once part of U.S. Route 119. US 119 was moved off of this routing when Corridor G was complete from Chapmanville to Danville by 1976. Once that section of four-lane highway was completed, US 119 was realigned to follow WV 10 north from Logan to Chapmanville and then the new Corridor G.

This is the second alignment to carry this number. The original West Virginia Route 17 followed what is now U.S. Route 35 in Putnam and Mason counties.

== Major intersections ==
County	Location	mi	km	Destinations	Notes
Logan	Stollings			WV 10	
Logan	Stollings			WV 17 Truck south / CR 119/20 (Stollings By-pass Road)	
Boone	Madison			WV 85 – Charleston, Van	
1.000 mi = 1.609 km; 1.000 km = 0.621 mi

== Truck WV 17 ==
West Virginia Route 17 Truck
- Location: Stollings

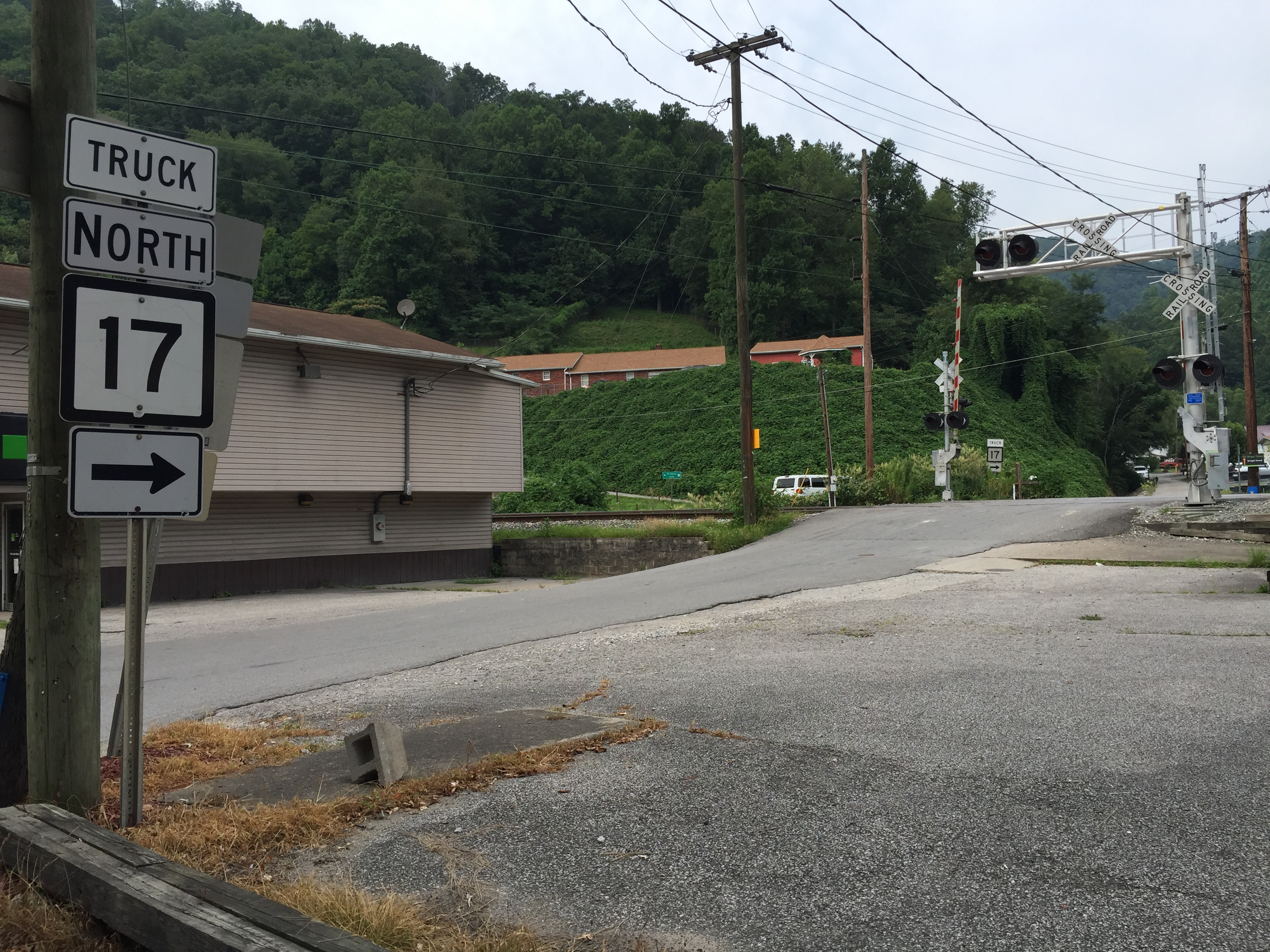
View north along WV 17 Truck at WV 10 in Stollings

There is a signed Truck WV 17 at Stollings to bypass a low overhead railroad bridge at WV 17's intersection with WV 10. The truck bypass follows WV 10 north to the first at-grade railroad crossing, then immediately back on a paralleling route beside the railroad tracks.
