= Stollings, West Virginia =

- Census-designated place
- Location within West Virginia Location within the United States
- Coordinates: 37°50′15″N 81°57′52″W
- Country: United States
- State: West Virginia
- County: Logan

Area
  - Total: 0.384 sq mi (0.99 km^{2})
  - Land: 0.359 sq mi (0.93 km^{2})
  - Water: 0.025 sq mi (0.065 km^{2})
- Elevation: 673 ft (205 m)

Population (2020)
  - Total: 310
  - Density: 860/sq mi (330/km^{2})
- Time zone: UTC-5 (Eastern (EST))
  - Summer (DST): UTC-4 (EDT)
- ZIP code: 25646
- Area codes: 304 & 681
- GNIS feature ID: 1547442
- FIPS code: 54-76996

Stollings is an unincorporated community and census-designated place (CDP) in central Logan County, West Virginia, United States. As of the 2020 census, it had a population of 310 (slightly down from 316 at the 2010 census).

== Geography ==
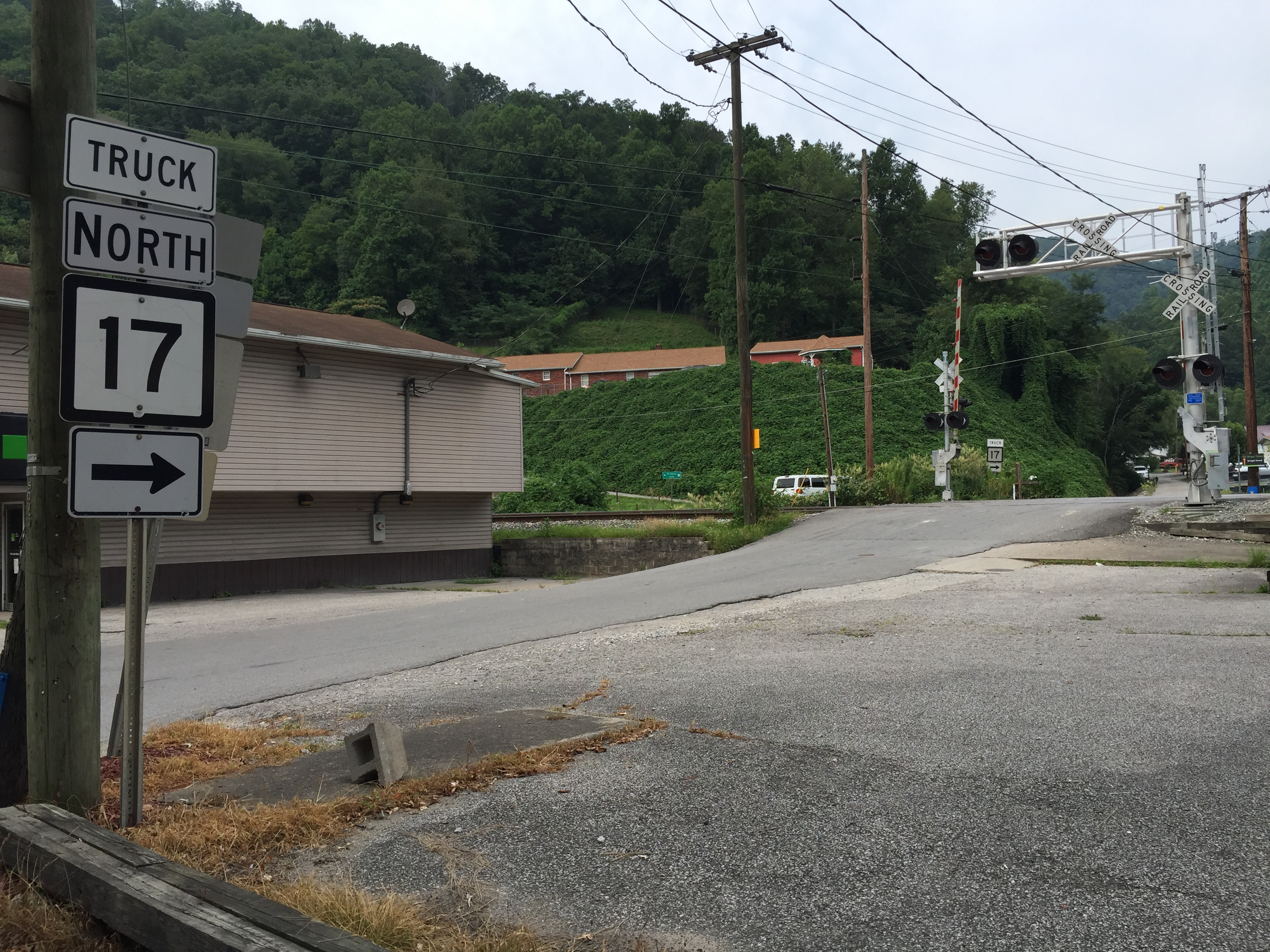
West Virginia Route 17 in Stollings, July 2017

Stollings is located in central Logan County on the Guyandotte River at the junction of West Virginia Route 10 (WV 10) and the southern terminus of West Virginia Route 17 (WV 17), 1.5 miles (2.4 km) east-southeast of Logan, the county seat. In addition to the two state highways that serve the community (WV 10 and WV 10), the entire length of West Virginia Route 17 Truck (a short 0.3-mile [0.48 km] bypass for a low railroad overpass near the southern terminus of WV 17) is located within Stollings.

The CDP is situated immediately southeast of the city of Logan and north of the CDP of McConnell. Stollings has a post office with ZIP code 25646.

According to the U.S. Census Bureau, the Stollings CDP has a total area of 0.39 square miles (1.0 km^{2}), of which 0.02 square miles (0.06 km^{2}), or 6.39%, are water. Stollings sits at the confluence of Dingess Run with the Guyandotte River.

== See also ==
- List of census-designated places in West Virginia
