= Cucumber, West Virginia =

- Census-designated place
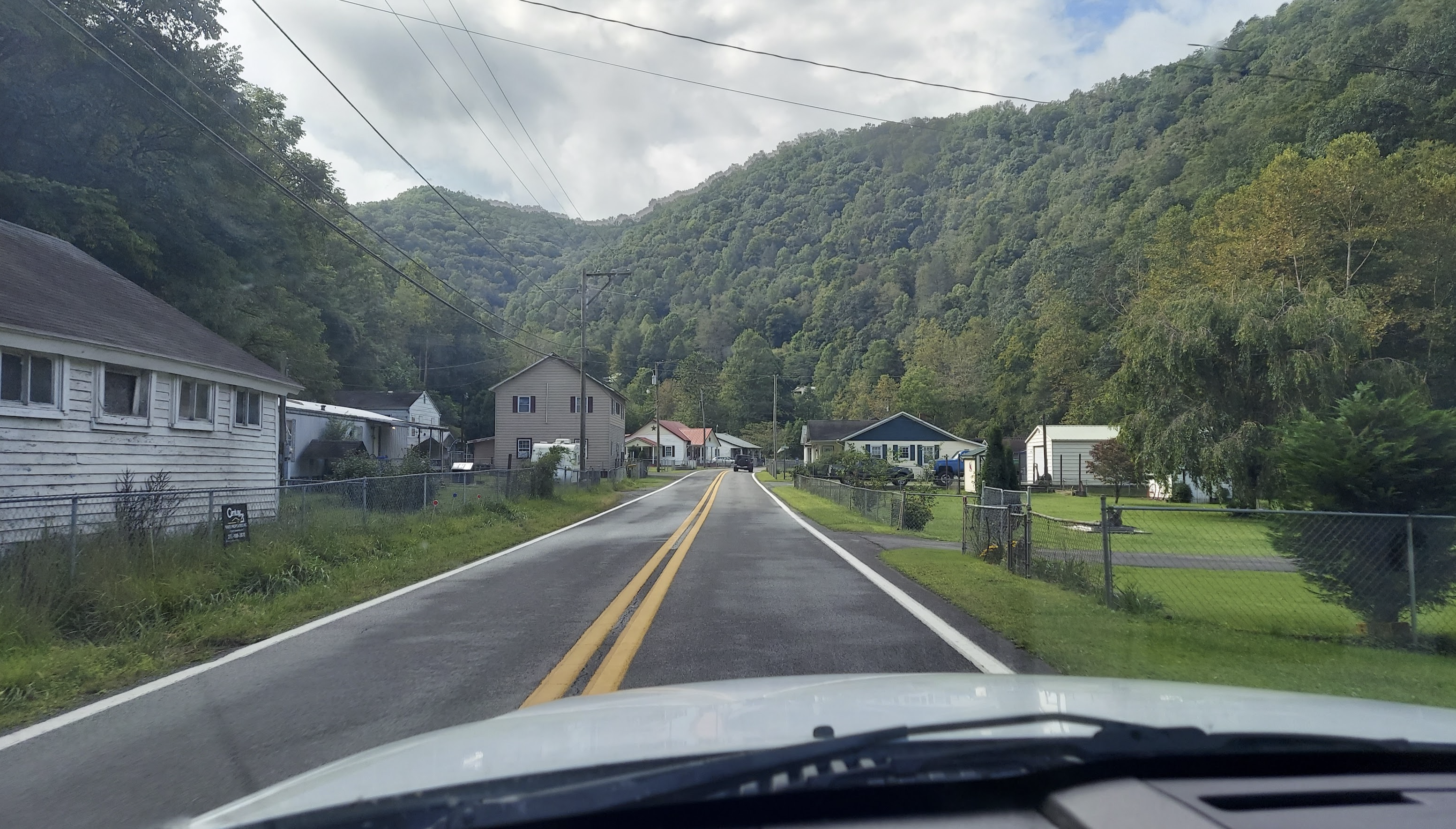
- The main area of Cucumber, West Virginia, viewed from West Virginia Route 16

- Location within West Virginia Location within the United States
- Coordinates: 37°16′40″N 81°37′36″W
- Country: United States
- State: West Virginia
- County: McDowell

Area
  - Total: 0.452 sq mi (1.17 km^{2})
  - Land: 0.452 sq mi (1.17 km^{2})
  - Water: 0 sq mi (0 km^{2})
- Elevation: 1,542 ft (470 m)

Population (2020)
  - Total: 74
  - Density: 160/sq mi (63/km^{2})
- Time zone: UTC-5 (Eastern (EST))
  - Summer (DST): UTC-4 (EST)
- ZIP codes: 24826
- GNIS feature ID: 1554238

Cucumber is a census-designated place (CDP) in McDowell County, West Virginia, United States. Its population was 74 at the 2020 census. The community is centered on mining. Named either for nearby Cucumber Creek or for the cucumber trees in the area, it is the only community in the United States with this name. Its post office was still active as of October 2011 (see image).

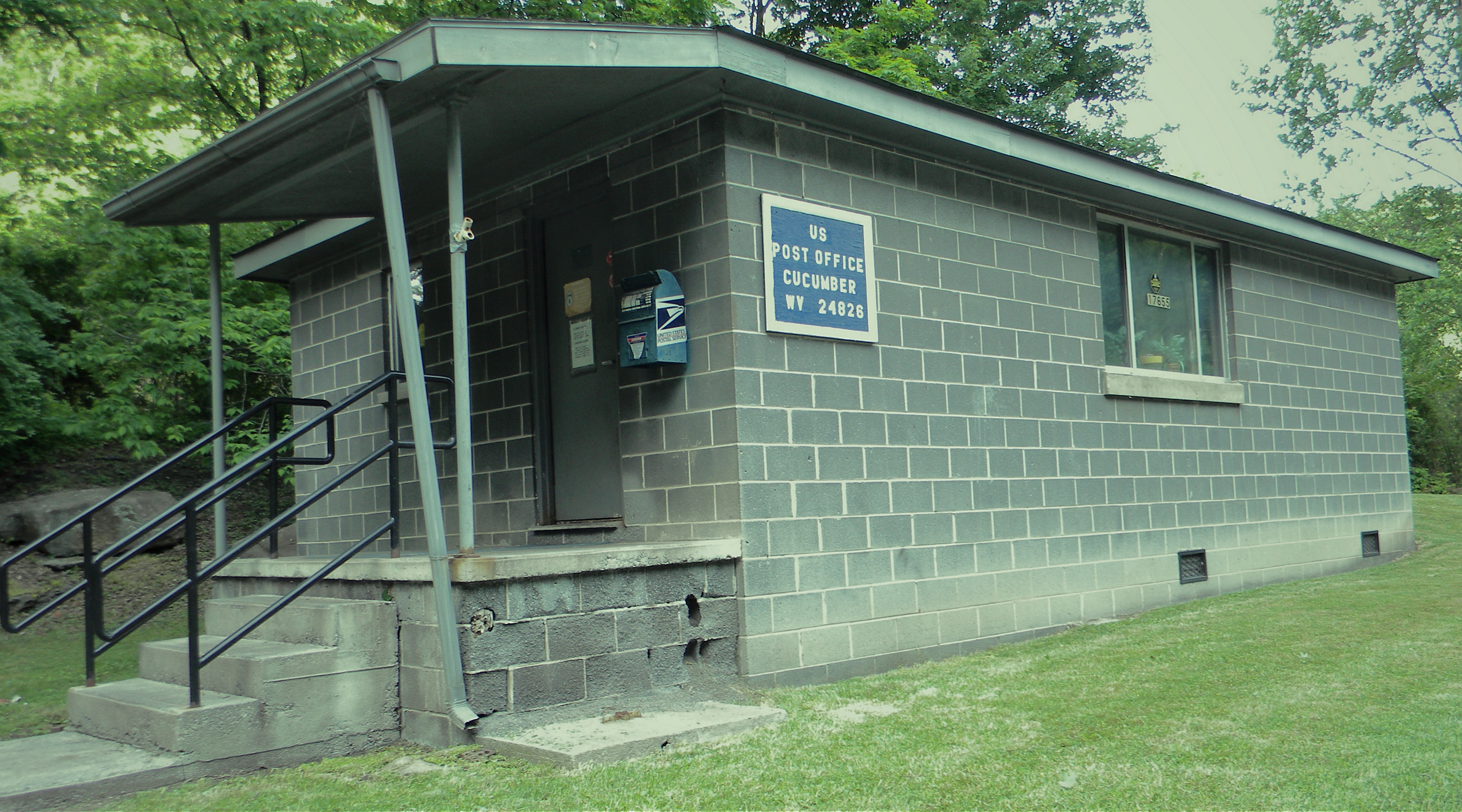
The U.S. Post Office in Cucumber

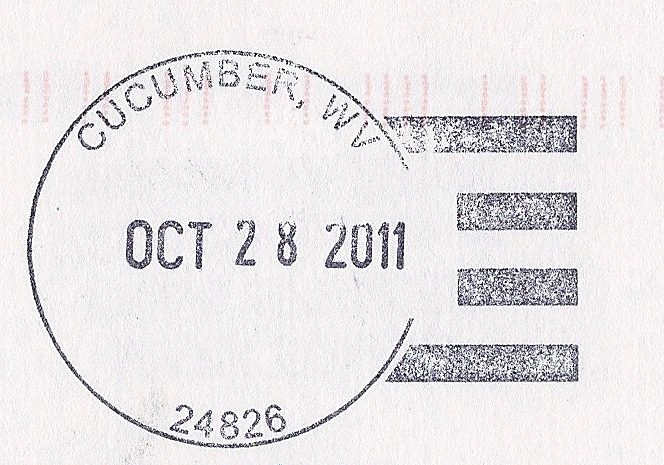
A postmark from the Cucumber Post Office

== Mine collapse ==
On January 13, 2007, a tunnel collapse at a Brooks Run Mining Company coal mine in town killed two miners. Between 2005 and 2008, the Brooks Mining Company extracted 2,093,165 tons of coal.

== Demographics ==
Historical population
| Census | Pop. | Note | %± |
|---|---|---|---|
| 2010 | 94 | | — |
| 2020 | 74 | | −21.3% |
U.S. Decennial Census

== See also ==
- List of census-designated places in West Virginia
