= Neibert, West Virginia =

- Census-designated place
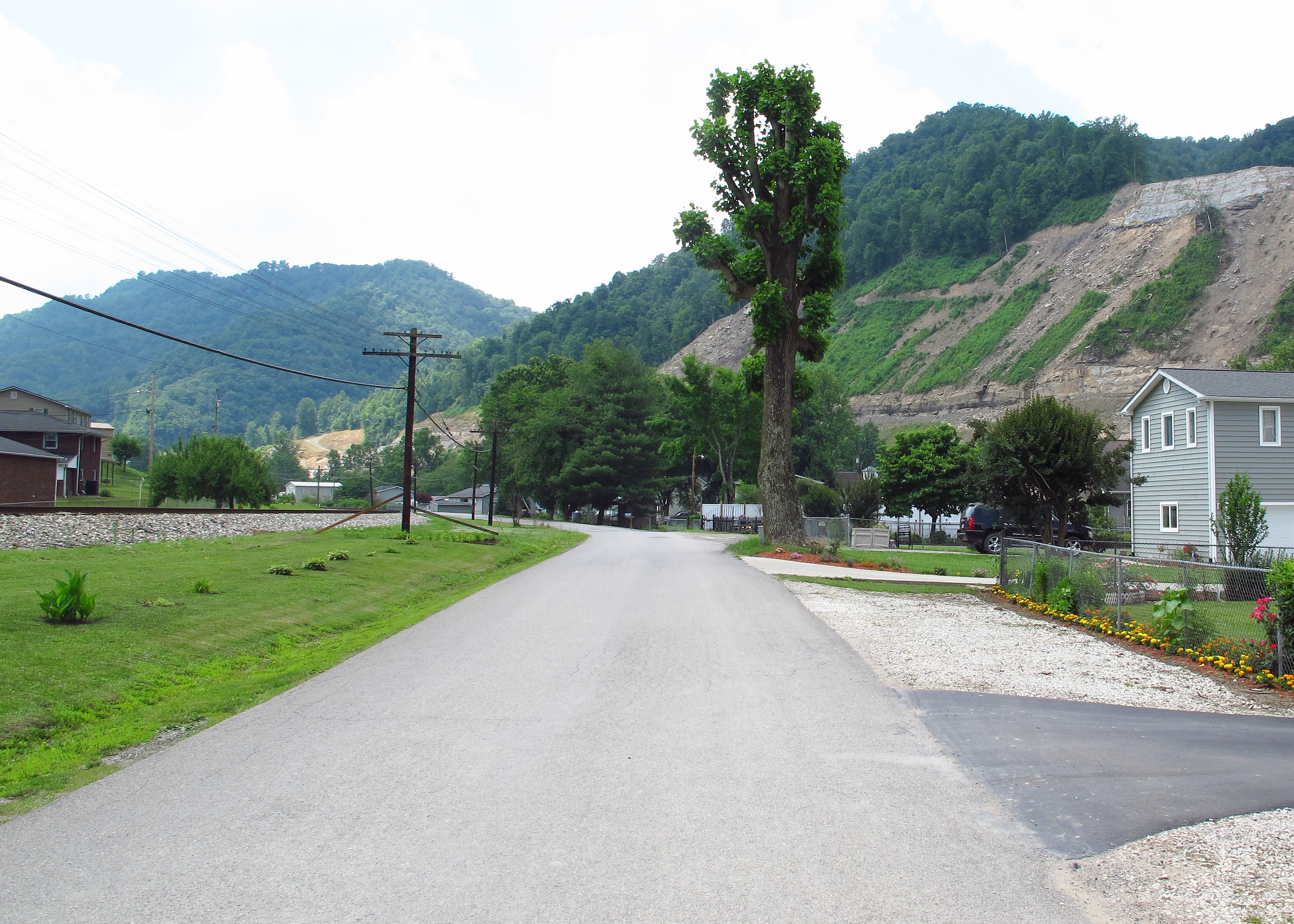
- Neibert Bottom Road

- Location within West Virginia Location within the United States
- Coordinates: 37°47′17″N 81°56′30″W
- Country: United States
- State: West Virginia
- County: Logan

Area
  - Total: 0.630 sq mi (1.63 km^{2})
  - Land: 0.612 sq mi (1.59 km^{2})
  - Water: 0.018 sq mi (0.047 km^{2})
- Elevation: 718 ft (219 m)

Population (2020)
  - Total: 205
  - Density: 335/sq mi (129/km^{2})
- Time zone: UTC-5 (Eastern (EST))
  - Summer (DST): UTC-4 (EDT)
- ZIP Code: 25632 (Lyburn)
- Area codes: 304 & 681
- GNIS feature ID: 1544085
- FIPS code: 54-57916

Neibert is an unincorporated community and census-designated place (CDP) in Logan County, West Virginia, United States. Its population was 205 at the 2020 census (up from 183 at the 2010 census).

== Geography ==
Neibert is in south-central Logan County, on the east side of the Guyandotte River. Hanging Rock Highway, former West Virginia Route 10, is the main road through the community, leading northwest (downriver) 8 miles (13 km) to Logan, the county seat, and southeast (upriver) 6 miles (10 km) to Man. Current WV-10 is a four-lane freeway that bypasses Neibert on the west side of the river; the closest access point is 0.8 miles (1.3 km) south of town, where Hanging Rock Highway crosses WV-10.

According to the U.S. Census Bureau, the Neibert CDP has a total area of 0.62 square miles (1.6 km^{2}), of which 0.02 square miles (0.05 km^{2}), or 2.83%, are water.
