= Bowden, West Virginia =

- Census-designated place
- Location within West Virginia Location within the United States
- Coordinates: 38°54′31″N 79°42′35″W
- Country: United States
- State: West Virginia
- County: Randolph

Area
  - Total: 0.124 sq mi (0.32 km^{2})
  - Land: 0.124 sq mi (0.32 km^{2})
  - Water: 0 sq mi (0 km^{2})
- Elevation: 2,215 ft (675 m)

Population (2020)
  - Total: 0
  - Density: 0.0/sq mi (0.0/km^{2})
- Time zone: UTC-5 (Eastern (EST))
  - Summer (DST): UTC-4 (EDT)
- ZIP code: 26254
- Area codes: 304 & 681
- GNIS feature ID: 1550432

Bowden is a census-designated place (CDP) in Randolph County, West Virginia, United States. Bowden is located on U.S. Route 33, 7.5 miles (12.1 km) east of Elkins. Bowden has a post office with ZIP code 26254. According to the 2020 Census, there were no inhabitants residing at this location (which is down from nine at 2010).
