= McConnell, West Virginia =

- Census-designated place
- Location within West Virginia Location within the United States
- Coordinates: 37°49′32″N 81°58′0″W
- Country: United States
- State: West Virginia
- County: Logan

Area
  - Total: 0.336 sq mi (0.87 km^{2})
  - Land: 0.314 sq mi (0.81 km^{2})
  - Water: 0.022 sq mi (0.057 km^{2})
- Elevation: 900 ft (270 m)

Population (2020)
  - Total: 412
  - Density: 1,310/sq mi (507/km^{2})
- Time zone: UTC-5 (Eastern (EST))
  - Summer (DST): UTC-4 (EDT)
- ZIP code: 25646
- FIPS code: 54-49732
- GNIS feature ID: 1555079

McConnell is an unincorporated community and census-designated place (CDP) in Logan County, West Virginia, United States, on the Guyandotte River. As of the 2020 census, its population was 412 (down from 514 at the 2010 census). It was established in 1933.

The community was named after one Mr. McConnell, a railroad promoter.

== Geography ==
McConnell is in central Logan County, on the east side of the Guyandotte River, a north-flowing tributary of the Ohio River. The CDP is bordered to the north by Stollings. Hanging Rock Highway, former West Virginia Route 10, is the main road through the community, leading northwest (downriver) 3 miles (5 km) to Logan, the county seat, and southeast (upriver) 10 miles (16 km) to Man. WV-10, now a four-lane limited access highway, runs up the valley on the west side of the river with local access 2 miles (3 km) southeast and northwest of town.

According to the U.S. Census Bureau, the McConnell CDP has a total area of 0.35 square miles (0.9 km^{2}), of which 0.02 square miles (0.06 km^{2}), or 6.58%, are water.
