= East Dailey, West Virginia =

- Census-designated place
- Location within West Virginia Location within the United States
- Coordinates: 38°46′49″N 79°53′27″W
- Country: United States
- State: West Virginia
- County: Randolph

Area
  - Total: 1.051 sq mi (2.72 km^{2})
  - Land: 1.051 sq mi (2.72 km^{2})
  - Water: 0 sq mi (0 km^{2})
- Elevation: 1,998 ft (609 m)

Population (2020)
  - Total: 469
  - Density: 446/sq mi (172/km^{2})
- Time zone: UTC-5 (Eastern (EST))
  - Summer (DST): UTC-4 (EDT)
- GNIS feature ID: 1554350

East Dailey is a census-designated place (CDP) in Randolph County, West Virginia, United States. As of the 2020 census, its population was 469 (down from 557 at the 2010 census). It is located within the Monongahela National Forest adjacent to the Tygart Valley River. East Dailey and its Old Timer's Camp are host to the Elkhenge Music Festival.
