= Boomer, West Virginia =

- Census-designated place (CDP)
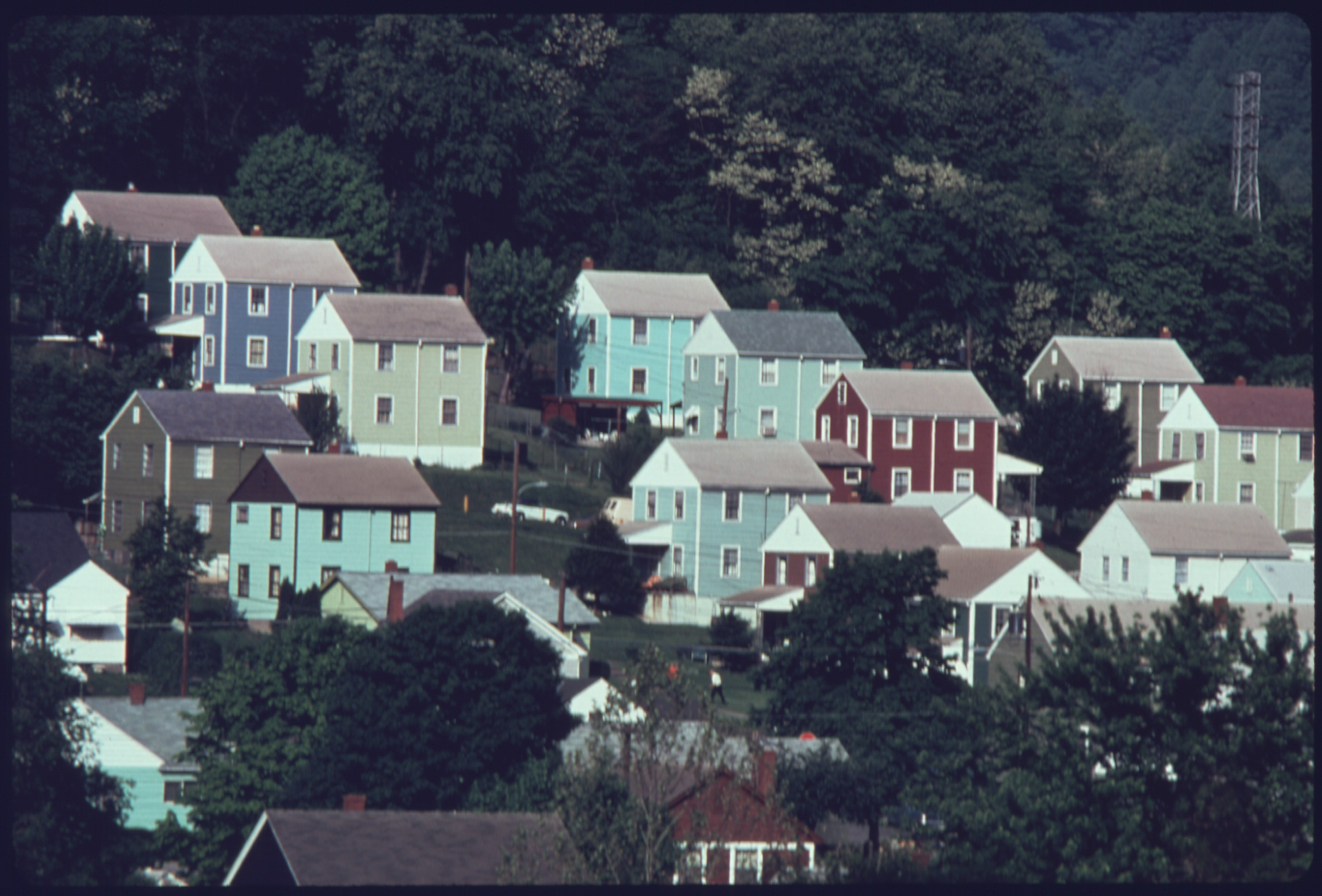
- Houses in Boomer in 1975

- Location within West Virginia Location within the United States
- Coordinates: 38°09′02″N 81°17′14″W
- Country: United States
- State: West Virginia
- County: Fayette

Area
  - Total: 1.481 sq mi (3.84 km^{2})
  - Land: 1.382 sq mi (3.58 km^{2})
  - Water: 0.099 sq mi (0.26 km^{2})
- Elevation: 646 ft (197 m)

Population (2020)
  - Total: 599
  - Density: 433/sq mi (167/km^{2})
- Time zone: UTC-5 (Eastern (EST))
  - Summer (DST): UTC-4 (EDT)
- ZIP code: 25031
- Area codes: 304 & 681
- GNIS feature ID: 1536227

Boomer is a census-designated place (CDP) in Fayette County, West Virginia, United States. Boomer is located on the north bank of the Kanawha River, 2 miles (3.2 km) southeast of Smithers. Boomer has a post office with ZIP code 25031. As of the 2020 census, its population was 599.

== History ==
The community takes its name from nearby Boomer Branch Creek.

The Boomer Coal and Coke Company operated four drift opening mines in Boomer Hollow during the early 1900s. The mine employed a large number of locals, to include many Italian immigrants who settled in the small town. On November 30, 1915, there was an explosion at the Number 2 Mine, which left 23 miners dead. 27 miners were rescued from the mine seven hours after the explosion, after they baracaded themselves into an area with fresh air.

On February 16, 2015, the town, along with neighboring Adena Village, was evacuated following the derailment of a C&O train consisting of two locomotives and 109 rail cars. The train, carrying crude oil, quickly exploded into a fireball, destroying one residence and causing substantial damage to surrounding residences in both Adena Village and Boomer. Crude oil swiftly flowed into the Kanawha River and set the water ablaze for over a half mile.

== Demographics ==
=== 2020 census ===
Boomer CDP, West Virginia – Racial and Ethnic Composition (NH = Non-Hispanic) Note: the US Census treats Hispanic/Latino as an ethnic category. This table excludes Latinos from the racial categories and assigns them to a separate category. Hispanics/Latinos may be of any race.
Race / Ethnicity	Pop 2010	Pop 2020	% 2010	% 2020
White alone (NH)	524	491	85.20%	81.97%
Black or African American alone (NH)	72	49	11.71%	8.18%
Native American or Alaska Native alone (NH)	1	0	0.16%	0.00%
Asian alone (NH)	1	0	0.16%	0.00%
Pacific Islander alone (NH)	0	0	0.00%	0.00%
Some Other Race alone (NH)	1	4	0.16%	0.67%
Mixed Race/Multi-Racial (NH)	12	51	1.95%	8.51%
Hispanic or Latino (any race)	4	4	0.65%	0.67%
Total	615	599	100.00%	100.00%
