= Roderfield, West Virginia =

Roderfield
- Census-designated place (CDP)
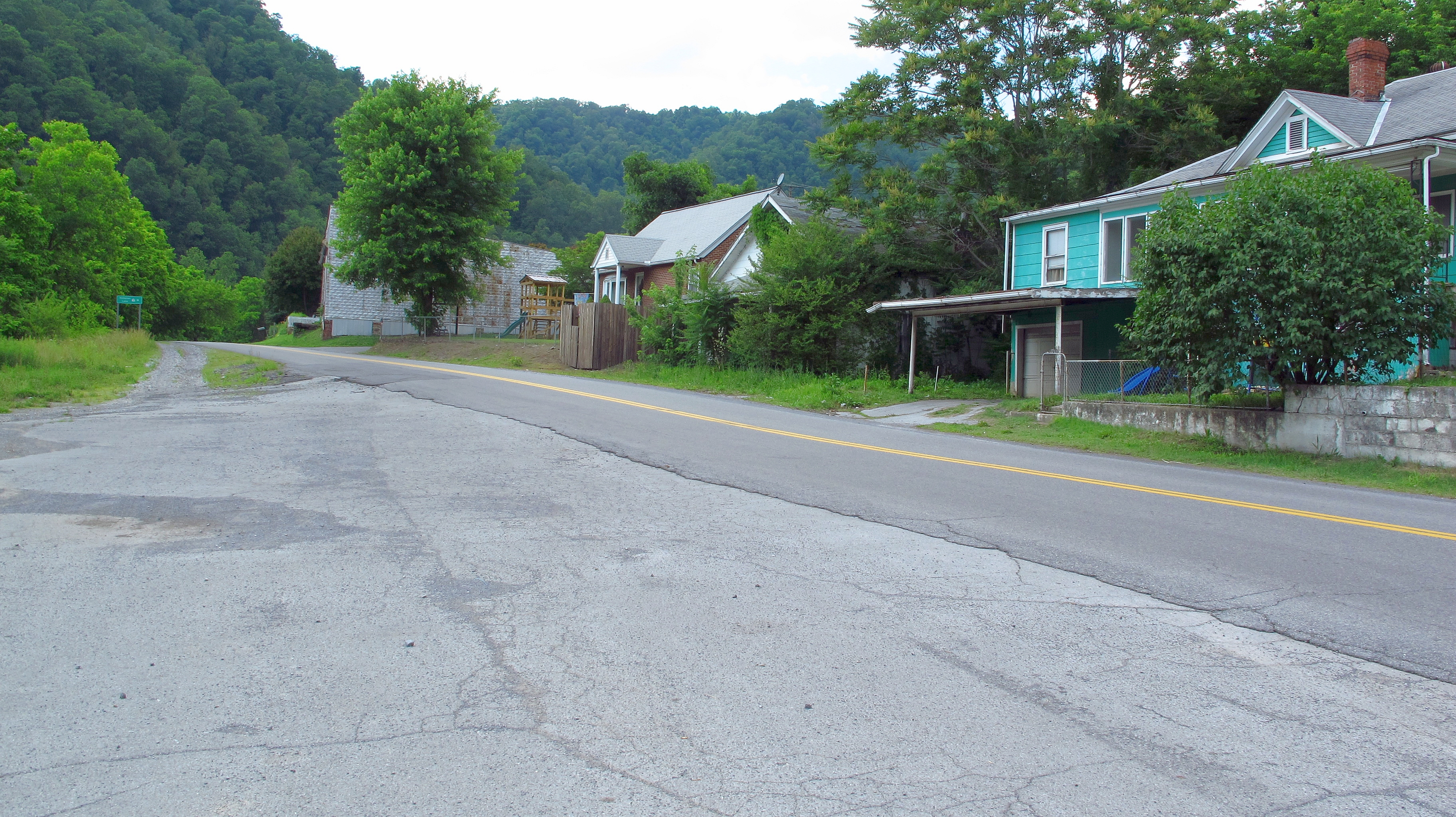
- Davy Roderfield Road in Roderfield

- Location within the state of West Virginia
- Coordinates: 37°27′01″N 81°42′20″W
- Country: United States
- State: West Virginia
- County: McDowell

Area
  - Total: 0.279 sq mi (0.72 km^{2})
  - Land: 0.265 sq mi (0.69 km^{2})
  - Water: 0.014 sq mi (0.036 km^{2})
- Elevation: 1,129 ft (344 m)

Population (2020)
  - Total: 62
  - Density: 230/sq mi (90/km^{2})
- Time zone: UTC-5 (Eastern (EST))
  - Summer (DST): UTC-4 (EDT)
- ZIP code: 24881
- Area codes: 304 & 681
- GNIS feature ID: 1555514

Roderfield is a census-designated place (CDP) in McDowell County, West Virginia, United States. Roderfield is 7 miles (11 km) west-northwest of Welch. Roderfield has a post office with ZIP code 24881. As of the 2020 census, its population is 62 (down from 188 at the 2010 census).

The community was named after Roderfield Iaeger, the original owner of the town site.
