= Chattaroy, West Virginia =

- Census-designated place (CDP)
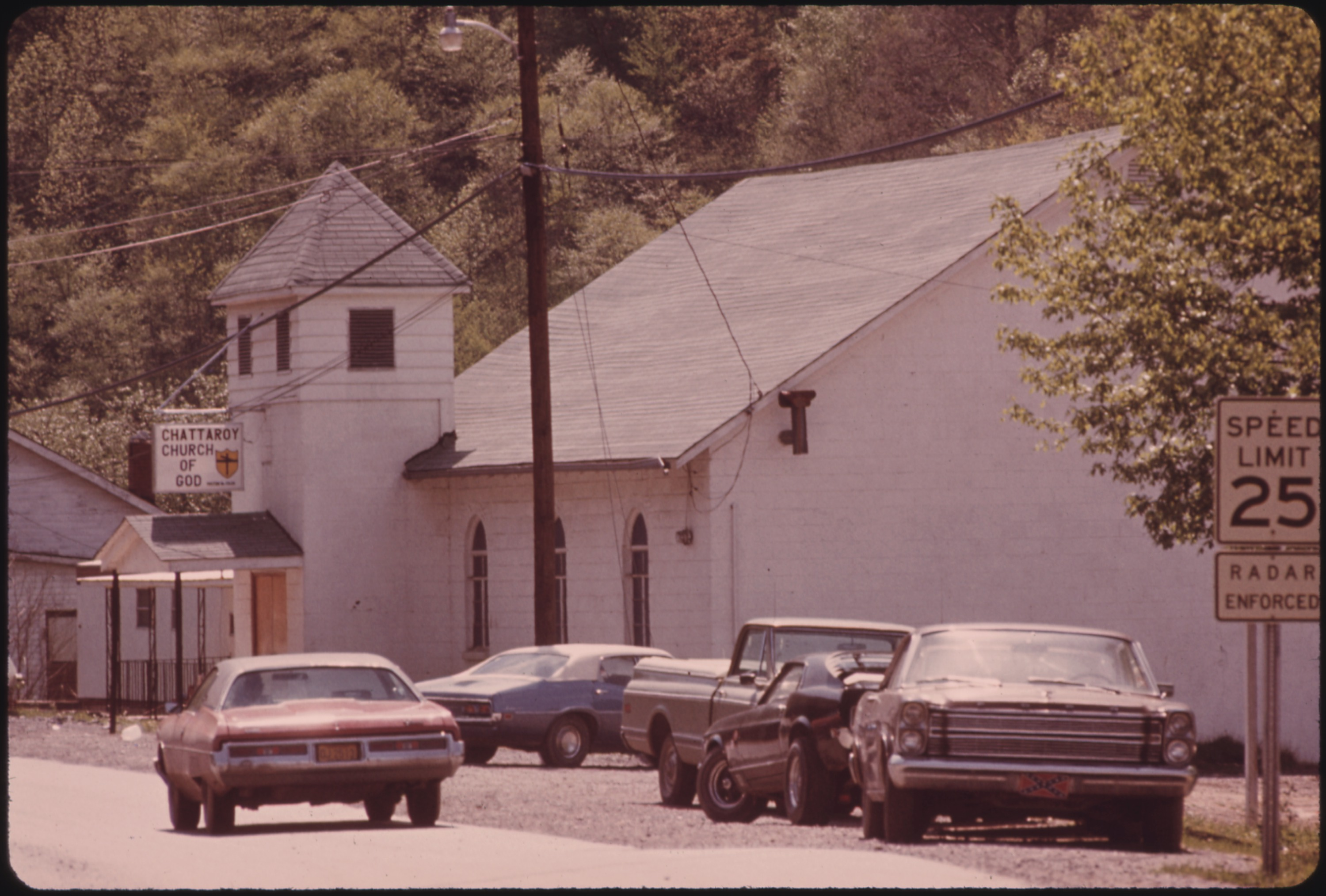
- Chattaroy Church of God, 1974

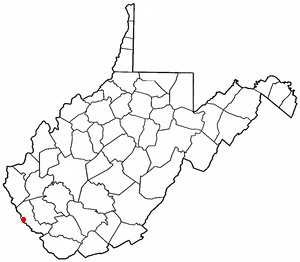
- Location of Chattaroy, West Virginia
- Coordinates: 37°42′8″N 82°17′1″W
- Country: United States
- State: West Virginia
- County: Mingo

Area
  - Total: 2.0 sq mi (5.3 km^{2})
  - Land: 2.0 sq mi (5.3 km^{2})
  - Water: 0 sq mi (0.0 km^{2})
- Elevation: 659 ft (201 m)

Population (2020)
  - Total: 641
  - Density: 310/sq mi (120/km^{2})
- Time zone: UTC-5 (Eastern (EST))
  - Summer (DST): UTC-4 (EDT)
- ZIP code: 25667
- Area code: 304
- FIPS code: 54-14692
- GNIS feature ID: 1554114

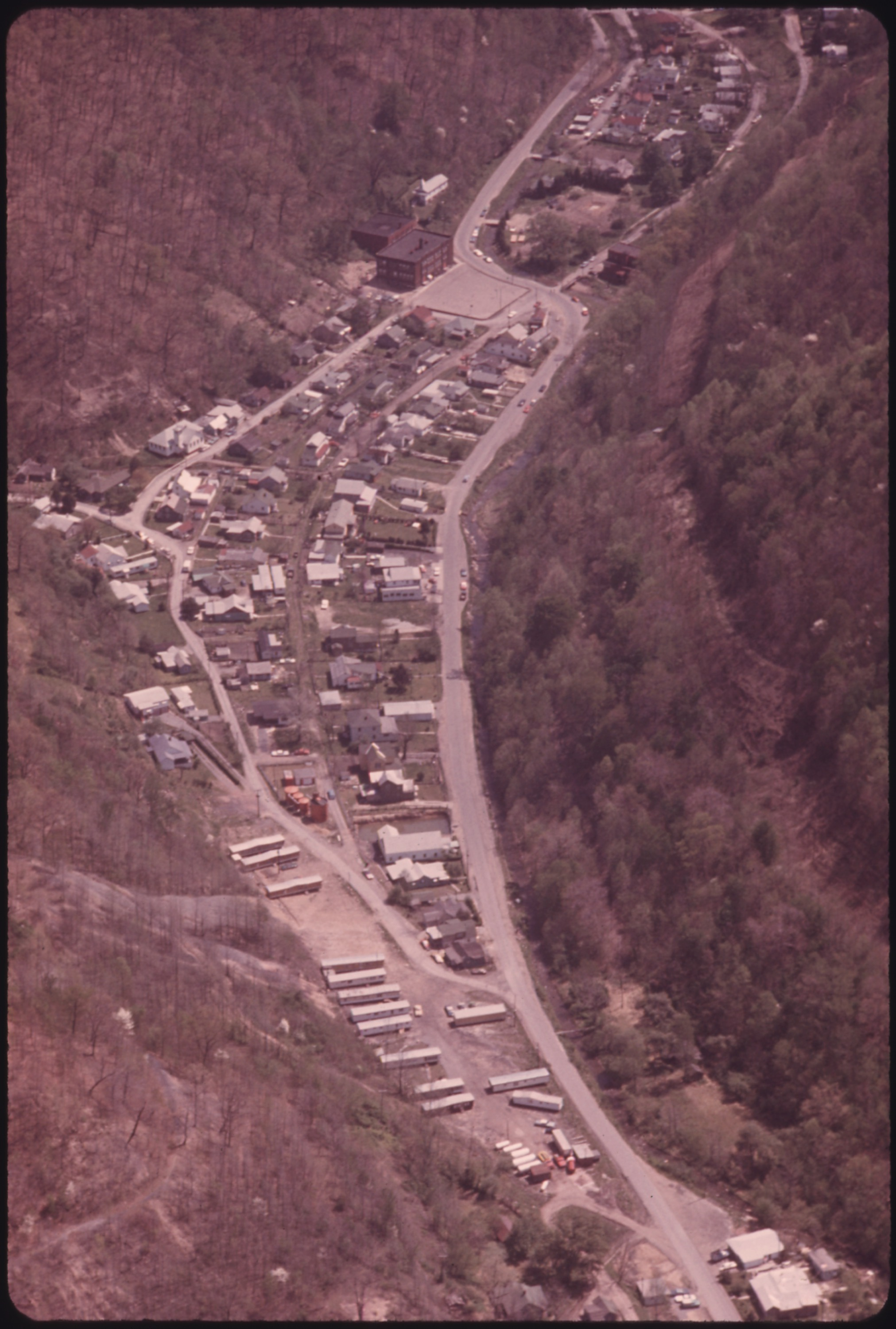
Aerial view of Chattaroy in 1974

Chattaroy is a census-designated place (CDP) in Mingo County, West Virginia, United States. The population was 641 at the 2020 census (down from 756 at the 2010 census).

The community's name is an accurate preservation of the Native American name of the nearby Big Sandy River, Chattaroy.

== Demographics ==
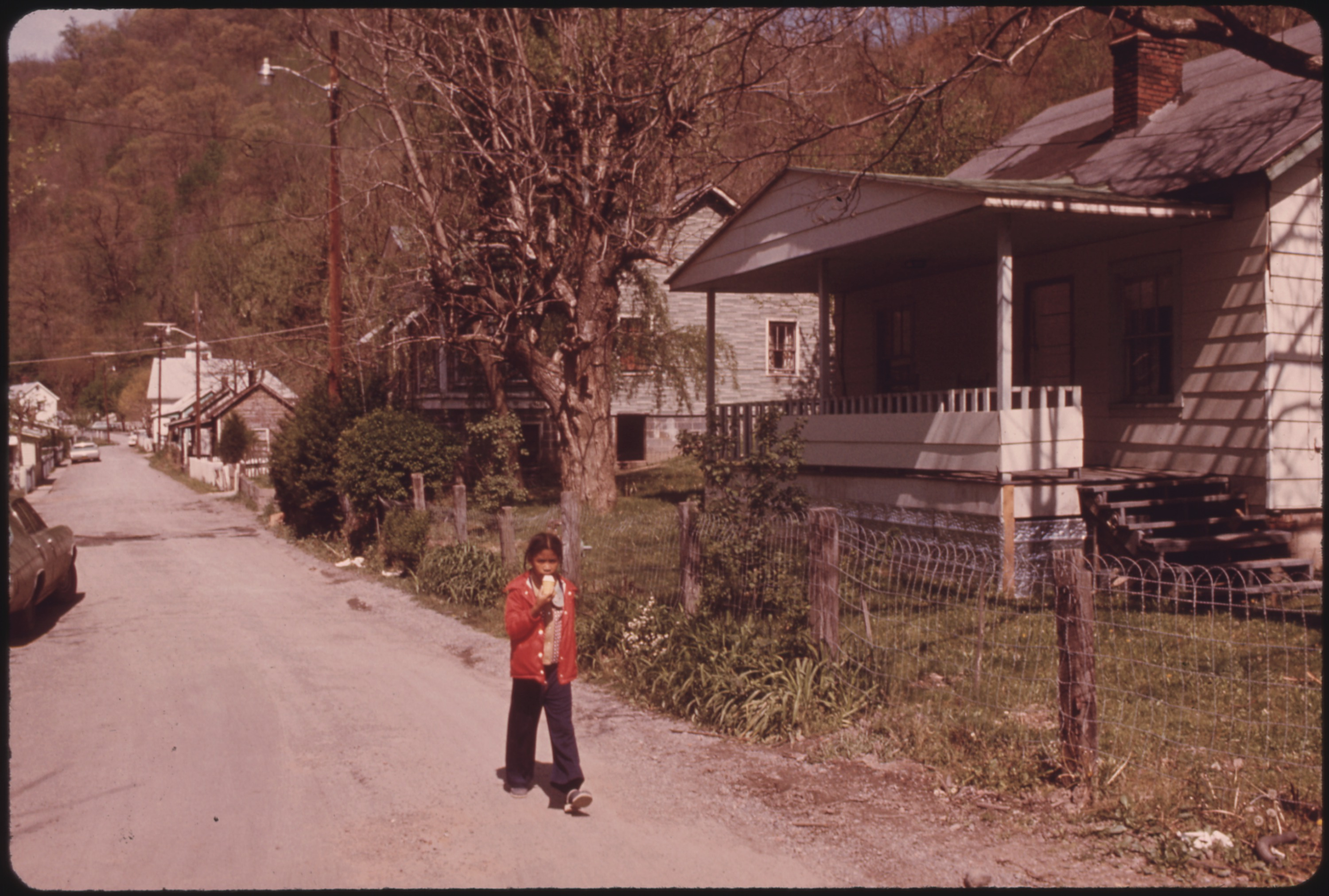
1974 DOCUMERICA photo, captioned "Youngster returning to school after going home during recess to get an ice cream cone. The town of Chattaroy, West Virginia, near Williamson, is small enough so the youngsters can do this. Many of them also go home for lunch."

As of the census of 2000, there were 1,136 people, 475 households, and 342 families residing in the CDP. The population density was 159.3 people per square mile (61.5/km^{2}). There were 524 housing units at an average density of 73.5/sq mi (28.4/km^{2}). The racial makeup of the CDP was 97.80% White, 1.41% African American, 0.09% Native American, and 0.70% from two or more races. Hispanic or Latino of any race were 0.53% of the population.

There were 475 households, out of which 29.5% had children under the age of 18 living with them, 56.0% were married couples living together, 13.1% had a female householder with no husband present, and 27.8% were non-families. 26.3% of all households were made up of individuals, and 11.6% had someone living alone who was 65 years of age or older. The average household size was 2.39 and the average family size was 2.88.

In the CDP, the population was spread out, with 21.5% under the age of 18, 9.9% from 18 to 24, 28.0% from 25 to 44, 26.7% from 45 to 64, and 14.0% who were 65 years of age or older. The median age was 39 years. For every 100 females, there were 85.3 males. For every 100 females age 18 and over, there were 83.9 males.

The median income for a household in the CDP was $31,563, and the median income for a family was $37,692. Males had a median income of $37,321 versus $17,841 for females. The per capita income for the CDP was $14,074. About 16.5% of families and 19.2% of the population were below the poverty line, including 35.3% of those under age 18 and 10.4% of those age 65 or over.

== Education ==
Chattaroy is in the Mingo County School District.
