= Kanawha =

Kanawha may refer to:

== Places ==
- Kanawha River in West Virginia, joining the Ohio River at Point Pleasant
  - Kanawha Falls, a waterfall on the Kanawha River
  - Kanawha Falls, West Virginia, an unincorporated community in Fayette County near the waterfall
  - Kanawha River Valley AVA, West Virginia wine region
- Little Kanawha River in West Virginia, joining the Ohio River at Parkersburg
  - Kanawha, West Virginia, an unincorporated community in Wood County near Parkersburg
- Kanawha County, West Virginia
  - Kanawha County textbook controversy, a violent school control struggle beginning in 1974
- State of Kanawha, an early name for the state of West Virginia
- Kanawha Canal, part of the James River and Kanawha Canal, a partially built canal in Richmond, VA
- Kanawha (Luray, Virginia), a historic house
- Kanawha, Iowa, city

== Railroad ==
- Kanawha, a type 2-8-4 railroad steam locomotive

== Ships ==
- Kanawha (1899), a steam yacht owned by Henry H. Rogers
- USS Kanawha or USNS Kanawha has been the name of seven ships of the United States Navy
- USS Kanawha II (SP-130), a yacht which served in the United States Navy from 1917 to 1919 and was renamed USS Piqua (SP-130) in 1918.
- The United States Coast Guard Cutter Kanawha, a buoy tender in Pine Bluff, Arkansas

== Other uses ==
- Kanawha, a solar deity in Seneca mythology
- Kanawha Valley people, an ancient indigenous people who lived in what is now West Virginia
- Kanawha saltworks, or Kanawha salines, a chain of salt wells and furnaces active in the 19th century along the Kanawha River
- "Kanawha", a song by rock band Seam from the album The Pace Is Glacial
