= Glen Ferris Inn =

- U.S. National Register of Historic Places
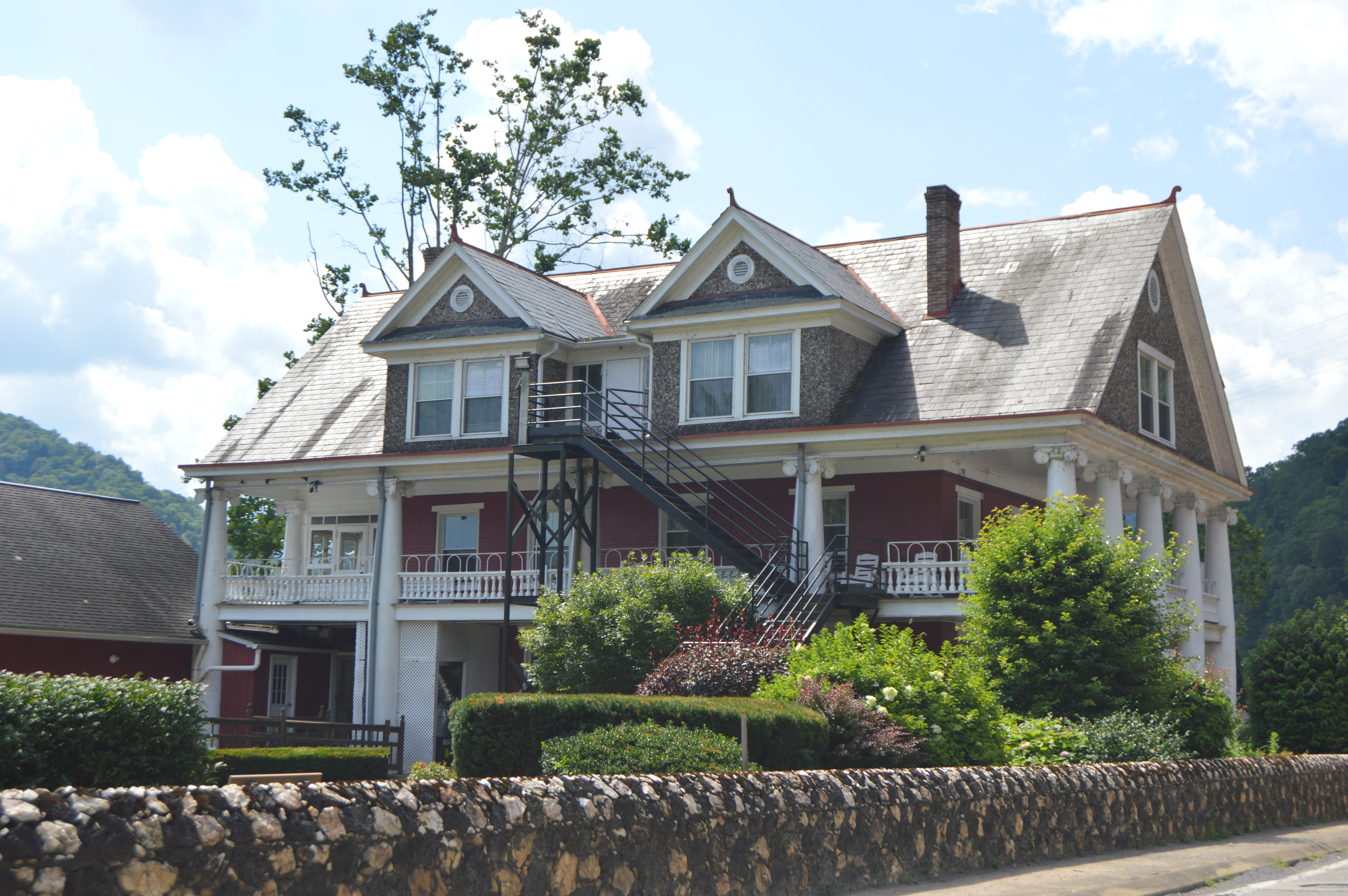
- Northern side and front

- Location within West Virginia Location within the United States
- Location: US 60 overlooking Kanawha Falls, Glen Ferris, West Virginia
- Coordinates: 38°9′1″N 81°12′53″W
- Area: 1.4 acres (0.57 ha)
- Built: 1848
- Architect: Bonaventura Bosia, Et al
- Architectural style: Classical Revival, Other, Vernacular Federal
- NRHP reference No.: 91000449
- Added to NRHP: April 25, 1991

Glen Ferris Inn, also known as Stockton's Inn, Stockton's Tavern, and Hawkins's Hotel, is a historic hotel located on the bank of the Kanawha River overlooking Kanawha Falls at Glen Ferris, Fayette County, West Virginia. It may have been built as early as 1815. It is a T-shaped brick building in two sections. One section is a three-story, painted brick dwelling. The second is a two-story, red brick wing measuring 140 by 40 feet (43 by 12 m). The building features a wraparound porch supported by 13 stuccoed brick columns. In the 19th century, the building was a stagecoach stop and served as a Union quartermaster's depot during the American Civil War. In the first half of the 20th century, it housed managers, supervisors, and workers involved in developing the area's manufacturing and hydro-electric capacity.

It was listed on the National Register of Historic Places in 1991.

In 2017, Tom Willis and Harrison Gilliam bought the Glen Ferris Inn. As of December 16, 2018 the Glen Ferris inn has re-opened and is taking reservations.
