= Kanawha Falls, West Virginia =

- Unincorporated community
- Location within West Virginia Location within the United States
- Coordinates: 38°08′33″N 81°12′23″W
- Country: United States
- State: West Virginia
- County: Fayette
- Elevation: 659 ft (201 m)
- Time zone: UTC-5 (Eastern (EST))
  - Summer (DST): UTC-4 (EDT)
- ZIP code: 25115
- Area codes: 304 & 681
- GNIS feature ID: 1554842

Kanawha Falls is an unincorporated community in Fayette County, West Virginia, United States. Kanawha Falls is located on the east bank of the Kanawha River, 2 miles (3.2 km) southwest of Gauley Bridge and 0.6 miles (0.97 km) downstream from the waterfall of the same name. Kanawha Falls had a post office, which opened on March 26, 1856, and closed on November 2, 2002.

== Gallery ==
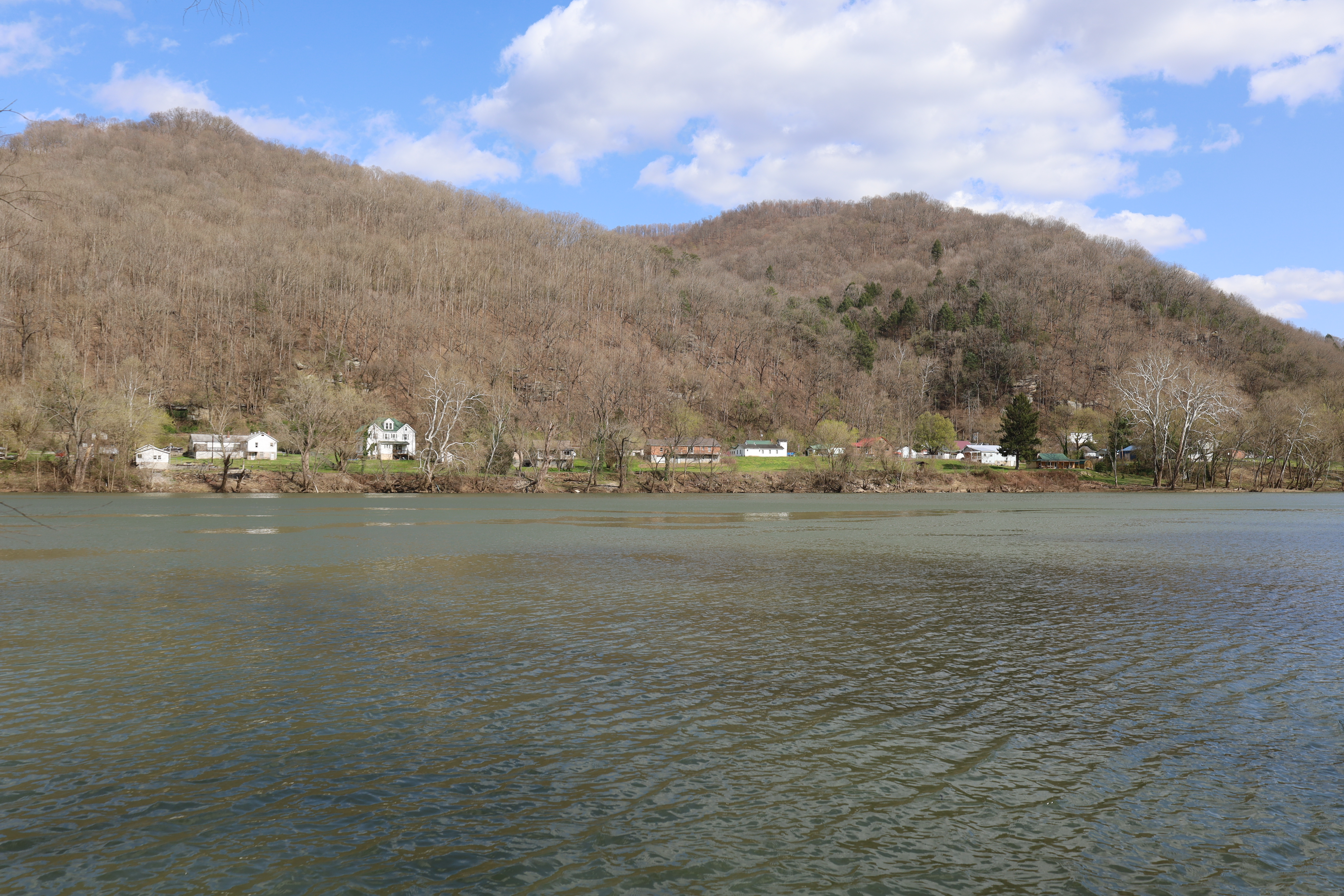
Kanawha Falls in 2022

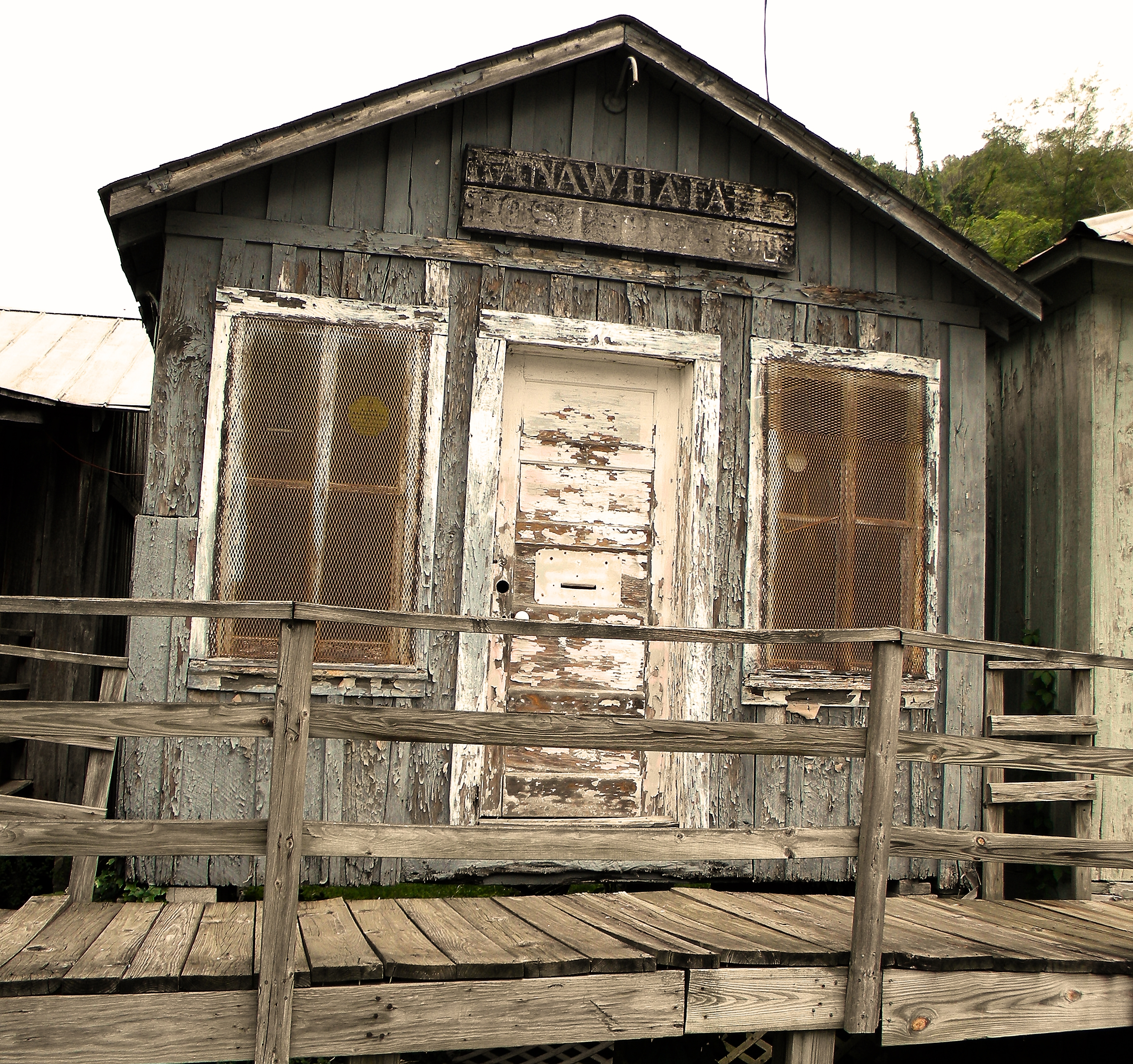
Kanawha Falls Post Office in 2015

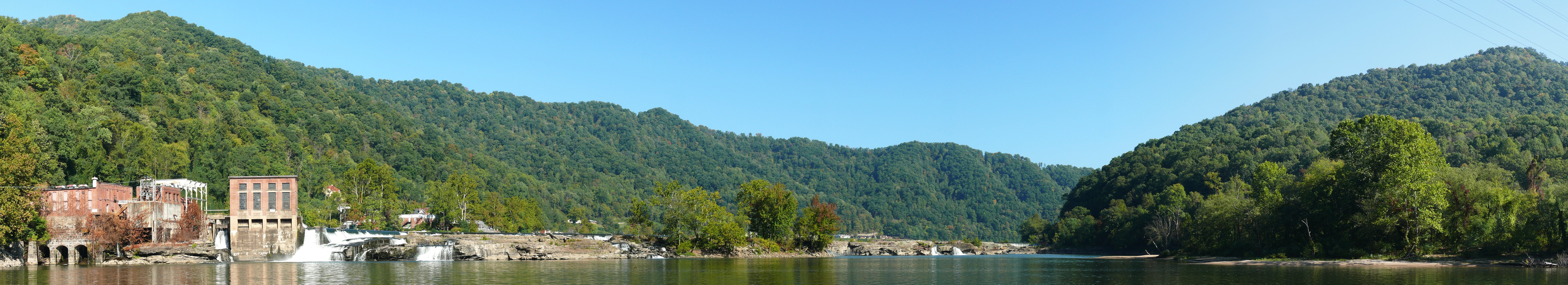
Kanawha Falls on the Kanawha River at Glen Ferris, WV
