= USS Kanawha =

Six ships of the United States Navy have been named USS Kanawha and one has been named USS Kanawha II:

- USS Kanawha (1861), a steamer that served from 1862 to 1865
- USS Kanawha (1896), a steamer that served in 1898 and was transferred to the U.S. Department of War in 1899
- USS Kanawha (AO-1), a replenishment oiler commissioned in 1915 and sunk 8 April 1943
- USS Kanawha (SP-169) was purchased by the U.S. Navy in 1917 for use as a patrol vessel, but was found defective during fitting out and returned to her owner.
- USS Kanawha II (SP-130), an armed yacht that served in the U.S. Navy from 1917 to 1919 and was renamed USS Piqua (SP-130) in 1918
- USS Kanawha (AOG-31), a gasoline tanker that served from 1944 to 1946
- USNS Kanawha (T-AO-196), is a fleet oiler in service with the U.S. Military Sealift Command since 1991
