= USNS Kanawha =

Oiler of the United States Navy

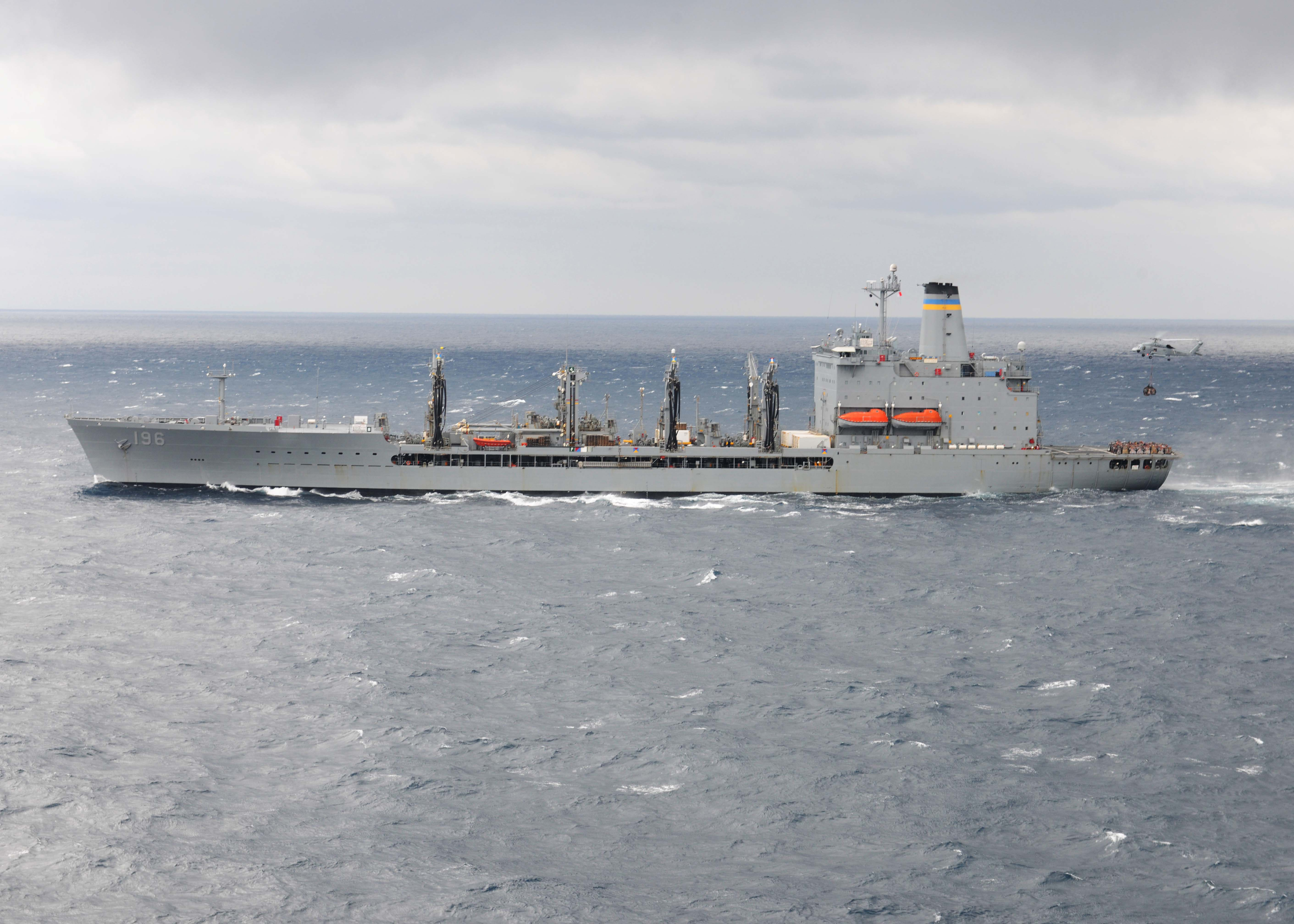
- USNS Kanawha (T-AO-196)

History

United States
- Name: USNS Kanawha
- Namesake: The Kanawha River in West Virginia
- Awarded: 1 February 1987
- Builder: Avondale Shipyards, Inc., New Orleans, Louisiana
- Laid down: 13 July 1989
- Launched: 22 September 1990
- In service: 6 December 1991-present
- Identification: IMO number: 8704080; MMSI number: 367865000; Callsign: NPTD
- Status: In active service with U.S. Military Sealift Command

General characteristics
- Class & type: Henry J. Kaiser-class replenishment oiler
- Type: Fleet replenishment oiler
- Tonnage: 31,200 deadweight tons
- Displacement: 9,500 tons light; Full load variously reported as 42,382 tons and 40,700 long tons (41,353 metric tons)
- Length: 677 ft (206 m)
- Beam: 97 ft 5 in (29.69 m)
- Draft: 36 ft (11 m) load line
- Installed power: 16,000 hp (11.9 MW) per shaft; 34,442 hp (25.7 MW) total sustained
- Propulsion: Two medium-speed Colt-Pielstick PC4-2/2 10V-570 diesel engines, two shafts, controllable-pitch propellers
- Speed: 20 knots (37 km/h; 23 mph)
- Capacity: 178,000 to 180,000 barrels (28,300 to 28,600 m^{3}) of fuel oil and jet fuel; 7,400 sq ft (690 m^{2}) dry cargo space; eight 20-foot (6.1 m) refrigerated containers with room for 128 pallets
- Complement: 103 (18 civilian officers, 1 U.S. Navy officer, 64 merchant seamen, 20 U.S. Navy enlisted personnel)
- Aircraft carried: None
- Aviation facilities: Helicopter landing platform
- Notes: Five refueling stations; Two dry cargo transfer rigs

USNS Kanawha (T-AO-196) is a Henry J. Kaiser-class fleet replenishment oiler of the United States Navy in non-commissioned service in the Military Sealift Command.

USNS Kanawha, the tenth Henry J. Kaiser-class ship, was laid down by the Avondale Shipyards in New Orleans, Louisiana, on 13 July 1989. She was launched on 22 September 1990 and delivered to the U.S. Navy and placed in non-commissioned service with the Military Sealift Command on 6 December 1991.

Kanawha is in active service with the Military Sealift Command Naval Fleet Auxiliary Force and is assigned to the U.S. Atlantic Fleet.

Presidential Unit Citation

In July 2026, the USNS Kanawha became the first civilian-crewed vessel in the 77-year history of the Military Sealift Command to receive the Presidential Unit Citation (PUC), the Pentagon's highest unit honor for combat heroism. The Mission: The ship was recognized for extraordinary performance during a high-stakes 204-day deployment supporting the USS Gerald R. Ford Carrier Strike Group. The Conflict: Operating under intense conditions during Operation Epic Fury and Operation Southern Spear, the crew pivoted from Latin American operations to sprint directly into contested waters in the Middle East. The Logistics: Despite being entirely unarmed, the merchant mariners executed 113 underway replenishments, delivering over 17 million gallons of fuel and thousands of supply pallets to keep American and coalition warships in the fight.

== Design ==
The Henry J. Kaiser-class oilers were preceded by the shorter Cimarron-class fleet replenishment oilers. Kanawha has an overall length of 206.5 metres (677 ft 6 in). It has a beam of 29.7 metres (97 ft) and a draft of 11 metres (36 ft). The oiler has a displacement of 41,353 tonnes (40,700 long tons) at full load. It has a capacity of 180,000 barrels (29,000,000 L; 7,600,000 US gal) of aviation fuel or fuel oil. It can carry a dry load of 690 square metres (7,400 sq ft) and can refrigerate 128 pallets of food. The ship is powered by two 10 PC4.2 V 570 Colt-Pielstick diesel engines that drive two shafts; this gives a power of 25.6 megawatts (34,800 PS; 34,300 shp).

The Henry J. Kaiser-class oilers have maximum speeds of 20 knots (37 km/h). They were built without armaments but can be fitted with close-in weapon systems. The ship has a helicopter platform but not any maintenance facilities. It is fitted with five fuelling stations; these can fill two ships at the same time and the ship is capable of pumping 3,400,000 litres (900,000 US gal) of diesel or 2,000,000 litres (540,000 US gal) of jet fuel per hour. It has a complement of eighty-nine civilians (nineteen officers), twenty-nine spare crew, and six United States Navy crew.

== Collision ==
On November 18, 2010, USNS Kanawha "briefly came into contact" with HMCS Fredericton of the Royal Canadian Navy during a replenishment-at-sea manoeuvre off the coast of Florida. There were no injuries, but both ships suffered "superficial" damage consisting of scrapes and dents on both hulls.
