= Glen Ferris, West Virginia =

- Census-designated place (CDP)
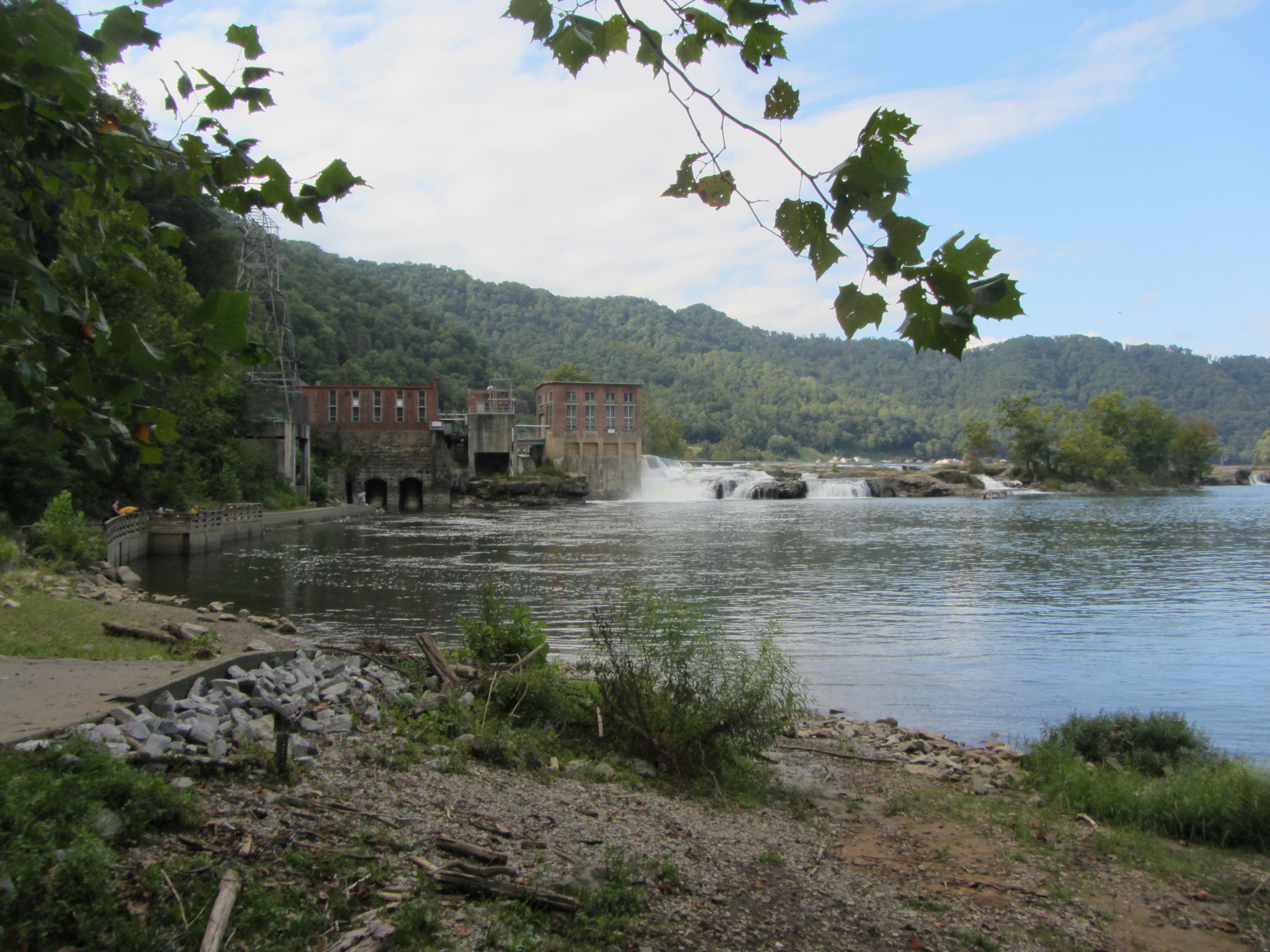

- Location within the state of West Virginia Glen Ferris (the United States)
- Coordinates: 38°09′11″N 81°12′53″W
- Country: United States
- State: West Virginia
- County: Fayette

Area
  - Total: 1.626 sq mi (4.21 km^{2})
  - Land: 1.376 sq mi (3.56 km^{2})
  - Water: 0.250 sq mi (0.65 km^{2})

Population (2020)
  - Total: 174
  - Density: 126/sq mi (48.8/km^{2})
- Time zone: UTC-5 (Eastern (EST))
  - Summer (DST): UTC-4 (EDT)

Glen Ferris is a census-designated place (CDP) on the western bank of the Kanawha River in Fayette County, West Virginia, United States. It is situated approximately one mile south of the town of Gauley Bridge and adjacent to Kanawha Falls. The sole highway linking Glen Ferris to the area is U.S. Route 60, known also as the Midland Trail. As of the 2010 census, its population was 203; the community had 104 housing units, 87 of which were occupied. By the 2020 census however, the population had declined to 174. The village is roughly a mile and a half in length. Glen Ferris is home to two churches, one Apostolic and one Methodist. A railway owned by Norfolk Southern runs parallel to US Route 60 through the village.

== History ==
The first permanent building to be constructed in Glen Ferris was the Glen Ferris Inn (originally a private residence) which was built in 1810. It served as a private home from 1810 until 1839 when it began operation as a hotel . In 1839, the home was purchased by Aaron Stockton who acquired a license from Fayette County to "open a common room", at which point, the building began to serve as an inn. The inn received several famous guests: Andrew Jackson, John Tyler, Henry Clay, and John James Audubon. During the Civil War, the inn, at different times, served as the host to officers from both sides including Confederate generals Henry A. Wise and John B. Floyd. Two Union generals stayed at the inn—Jacob D. Cox and William S. Rosecrans. At one point during the war, Rutherford B. Hayes and William McKinley, who were encamped across the Kanawha River, spent time at the inn.

After falling into disrepair, the inn was renovated and an addition was built in the 1960s (date uncertain). A further addition of a dining hall was completed in the 1980s (date uncertain). In 1996, the Inn was purchased from Elkem Metals by a local family. The new proprietors added a glass walled Dining Room that overlooks the Kanawha Falls and continue to operate the Glen Ferris Inn as a hotel. On the east bank of the river, across from the inn, lay the remnants of Camp Reynolds, a Union Army camp and gun embankment used in the Civil War.

After the Civil War, the area began to grow as coal production escalated in the state of West Virginia and abundant water made the generation of power inexpensive. In the early part of the 1900s, a dam was constructed across the river from Glen Ferris. Trains operated on both sides of the river, carrying passengers as well as coal. In 1917, Union Carbide purchased a small hydro electric plant in Glen Ferris, the brick remains of which can still be seen on the edge of the Kanawha River and which is being presently renovated. While continuing to operate this small plant, in 1929-30, Carbide built a much larger ferro-alloys plant at Alloy, a few miles downriver from Glen Ferris, which, at that time, was the world's largest ferro-alloys plant, employing some 2800 people, during its heyday from the time of its construction through the early 1960s. In order to generate power for the larger plant by diverting water from the New River, the company had a three-mile-long tunnel built through the mountain at Hawks Nest. The rock through which the tunnel was built consisted of 98% pure silica and caused acute silica poisoning among hundreds of unprotected workers, many of whom died. Many who died were buried close by in mass graves on the property which is now the Hawks Nest Country Club. At the time, the nearby town of Gauley Bridge became known as "the town of the walking dead". The disaster became the focus of congressional hearings in Washington, D.C., in the mid-thirties, and acute silicosis was identified as an occupational illness for the first time. The town of Glen Ferris followed the pattern already set by mine companies in the area. Union Carbide built a majority of the homes in Glen Ferris, as well as in other towns in the Upper Kanawha Valley and leased them to workers and their families. During its heyday, Union Carbide also provided a recreation hall in the upper end of the village. A post office/general store, an elementary school, a tennis court, a bowling alley, and a playground also served the residents. After the 1950s, as plant production declined, Union Carbide began to sell the houses to their occupants. In the 1970s, several homes were constructed on the mountainside above Glen Ferris in the north end of town; these would be Glen Ferris' largest homes and lead to its continued development as a place where people chose to live, primarily for its scenic views and in contrast to surrounding towns along Route 60. In recent years, several even larger homes have been built on the northern edge of Glen Ferris, close to Gauley Bridge. The elementary school was closed in 1961; the apostolic church stands there now. Nearby whitewater rafting on the New River Gorge has brought many tourists to the town.
