= Gauley Bridge, West Virginia =

Town in West Virginia, United States

- Town
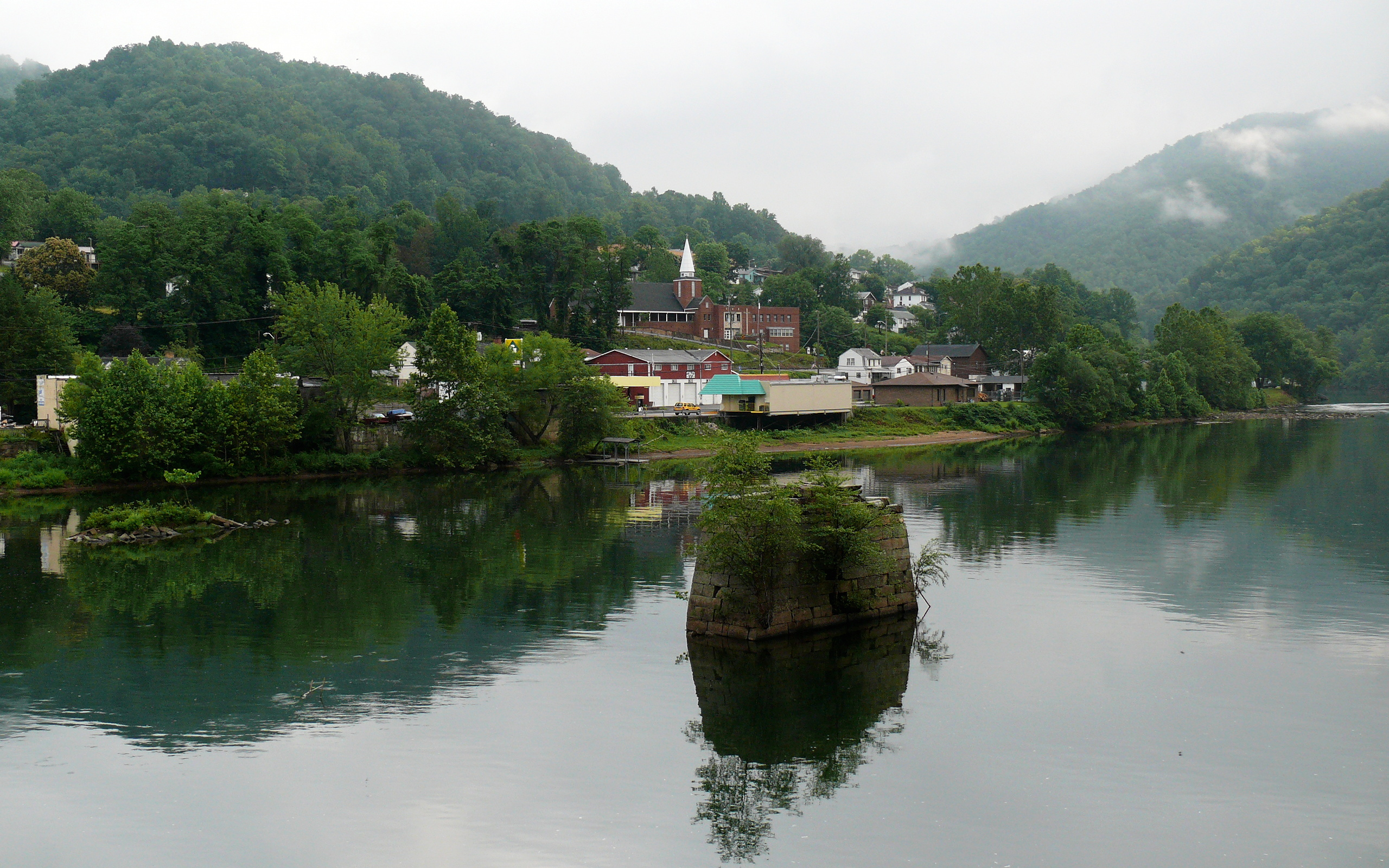

- Location of Gauley Bridge in Fayette County, West Virginia.
- Coordinates: 38°10′4″N 81°11′49″W
- Country: United States
- State: West Virginia
- County: Fayette

Area
  - Total: 1.63 sq mi (4.22 km^{2})
  - Land: 1.58 sq mi (4.10 km^{2})
  - Water: 0.046 sq mi (0.12 km^{2})
- Elevation: 810 ft (247 m)

Population (2020)
  - Total: 553
  - Density: 349.5/sq mi (134.93/km^{2})
- Time zone: UTC-5 (Eastern (EST))
  - Summer (DST): UTC-4 (EDT)
- ZIP code: 25085
- Area code: 304
- FIPS code: 54-30364
- GNIS feature ID: 1554543
- Website: https://local.wv.gov/gauleybridge/Pages/default.aspx

Gauley Bridge is a town in Fayette County, West Virginia, United States. The population was 553 at the 2020 census. The Kanawha River is formed at Gauley Bridge by the confluence of the New and Gauley Rivers. Two miles to the southwest of Gauley Bridge, in Glen Ferris, is Kanawha Falls, a popular stopping point on Midland Trail Scenic Highway.

The community was named after a bridge over the Gauley River near the original town site. Gauley Bridge was close to the site of the Hawks Nest Tunnel disaster, in which hundreds of people died in the 1920s and 1930s.

== Geography ==
Gauley Bridge is located at 38°10′04″N 81°11′49″W (38.167815, -81.197079).

According to the United States Census Bureau, the town has a total area of 1.63 square miles (4.22 km^{2}), of which 1.58 square miles (4.09 km^{2}) is land and 0.05 square miles (0.13 km^{2}) is water.

== Demographics ==
Historical population
| Census | Pop. | Note | %± |
|---|---|---|---|
| 1980 | 1,177 | | — |
| 1990 | 691 | | −41.3% |
| 2000 | 738 | | 6.8% |
| 2010 | 614 | | −16.8% |
| 2020 | 553 | | −9.9% |
U.S. Decennial Census

=== 2010 census ===
Railroad-themed mural in Gauley Bridge photographed by Carol M. Highsmith

As of the census of 2010, there were 614 people, 279 households, and 159 families living in the town. The population density was 388.6 inhabitants per square mile (150.0/km^{2}). There were 361 housing units at an average density of 228.5 per square mile (88.2/km^{2}). The racial makeup of the town was 98.9% White, 0.3% Native American, and 0.8% from two or more races. Hispanic or Latino of any race were 0.5% of the population.

There were 279 households, of which 23.3% had children under the age of 18 living with them, 34.8% were married couples living together, 16.5% had a female householder with no husband present, 5.7% had a male householder with no wife present, and 43.0% were non-families. 37.6% of all households were made up of individuals, and 18.3% had someone living alone who was 65 years of age or older. The average household size was 2.20 and the average family size was 2.87.

The median age in the town was 43.5 years. 19.4% of residents were under the age of 18; 8.4% were between the ages of 18 and 24; 24.9% were from 25 to 44; 30% were from 45 to 64; and 17.3% were 65 years of age or older. The gender makeup of the town was 48.4% male and 51.6% female.

=== 2000 census ===
As of the census of 2000, there were 738 people, 325 households, and 205 families living in the town. The population density was 458.6 inhabitants per square mile (177.0/km^{2}). There were 374 housing units at an average density of 232.4 per square mile (89.7/km^{2}). The racial makeup of the town was 97.43% White, 0.68% African American, 0.68% from other races, and 1.22% from two or more races. Hispanic or Latino of any race were 1.36% of the population.

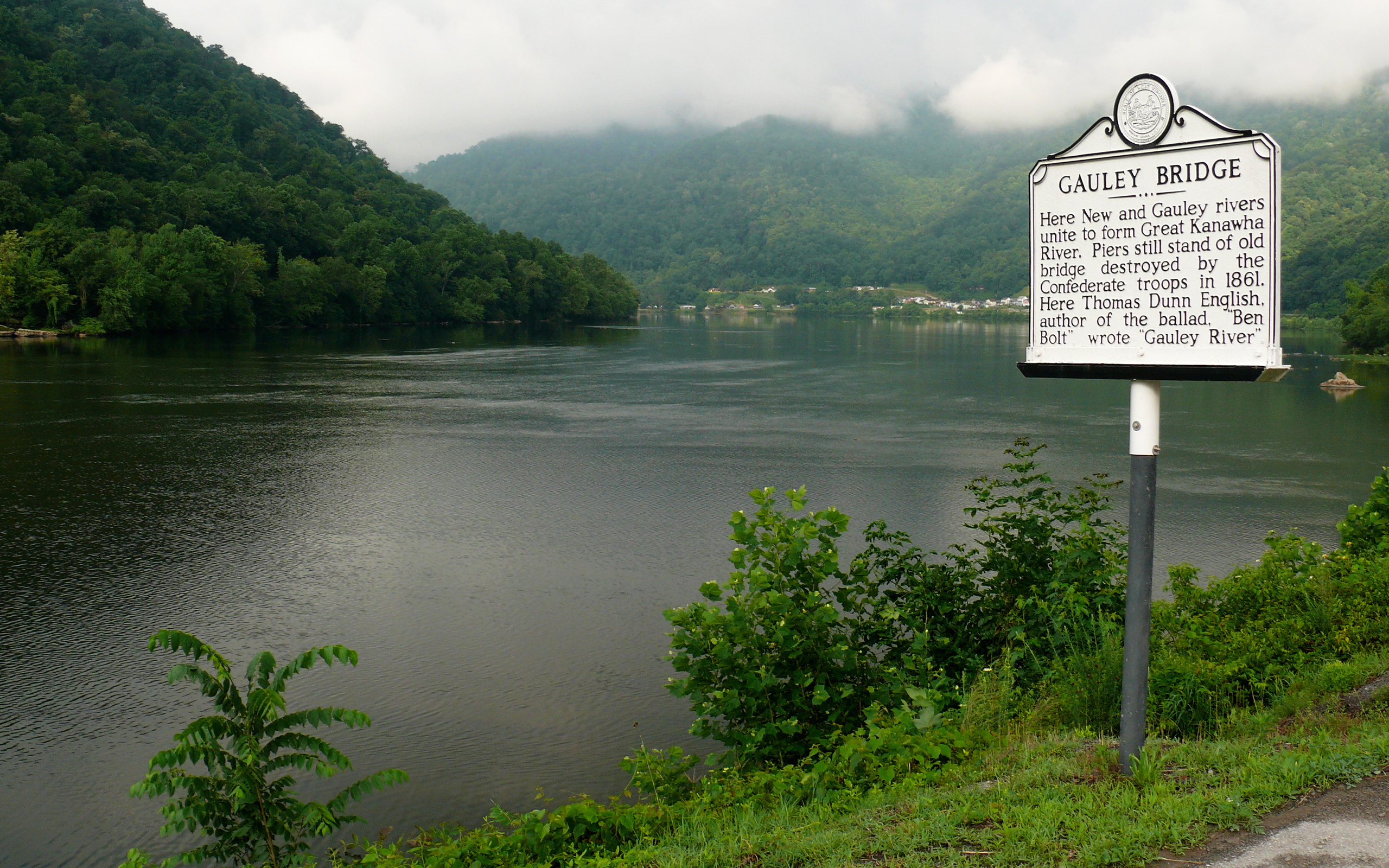
One of several roadside historical markers in Gauley Bridge. The town of Glen Ferris can be seen in the background.

There were 325 households, out of which 28.0% had children under the age of 18 living with them, 42.8% were married couples living together, 15.1% had a female householder with no husband present, and 36.9% were non-families. 31.4% of all households were made up of individuals, and 13.8% had someone living alone who was 65 years of age or older. The average household size was 2.26 and the average family size was 2.80.

In the town, the population was spread out, with 22.6% under the age of 18, 11.7% from 18 to 24, 26.3% from 25 to 44, 23.3% from 45 to 64, and 16.1% who were 65 years of age or older. The median age was 35 years. For every 100 females, there were 88.3 males. For every 100 females age 18 and over, there were 86.0 males.

The median income for a household in the town was $22,500, and the median income for a family was $25,987. Males had a median income of $26,250 versus $19,688 for females. The per capita income for the town was $11,820. About 26.7% of families and 33.4% of the population were below the poverty line, including 49.7% of those under age 18 and 24.7% of those age 65 or over.

== Transportation ==
U.S. Route 60, WV 16, and WV 39 all intersect in Downtown Gauley Bridge.

== Notable person ==
- MacGillivray Milne, 27th Governor of American Samoa

== See also ==
- Holy Ghost People (1967 film)
