= Ferry Branch =

Stream in West Virginia, U.S.

Coordinates: 38°21′10″N 81°38′48″W

Ferry Branch is a stream in the U.S. state of West Virginia.

Ferry Branch was named so named on account of a ferry which operated near its mouth.

== See also ==
- List of rivers of West Virginia
