= Kanawha Falls =

Major waterfall on Kanawha River, West Virginia

Coordinates: 38°09′10″N 81°12′44″W

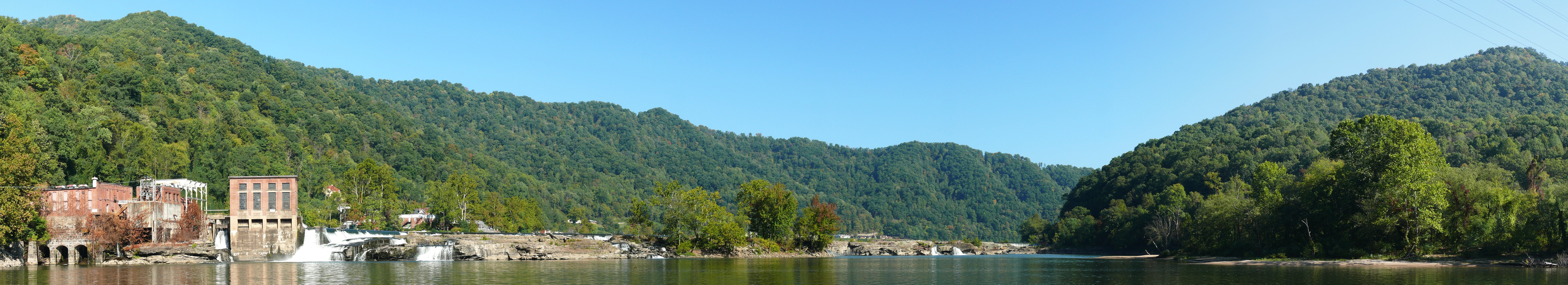
Kanawha Falls on the Kanawha River at Glen Ferris, WV

Kanawha Falls is a waterfall on the Kanawha River in the U.S. state of West Virginia that has been a barrier to fish movement for more than 1 million years. The waterfall is formed by a diagonal sandstone ledge across the river about 1 mile (1.6 km) downstream from the confluence of the New and Gauley rivers. It is 24 ft (7.3 m) high.

A low concrete overflow dam built in 1920 along the crest of the falls directs part of the flow to an electric generating plant on the western (right) bank of the river at the community of Glen Ferris. The plant was rehabilitated beginning in 2010 and fully returned to operation in 2012. The community of Gauley Bridge is 2 mi (3.2 km) upstream from Glen Ferris along U.S. Route 60. On the eastern (left) bank, a community named Kanawha Falls is about 0.6 mi (0.97 km) downstream.

Kanawha Falls is the upstream limit of several fish species that broadly inhabit the Ohio River watershed. Above the waterfall, the watershed has fewer fish species overall, a relatively high number of species found nowhere else in the world, and nearly as many non-native species as natives.

The waterfall also divides the flat-water barge navigation industry downstream from the recreational white-water rafting industry upstream. The waterfall is one stop on the West Virginia Tourism statewide Waterfall Trail.

Streamflow and flood information at Kanawha Falls since 1877 is available from the U.S. Geological Survey. Three reservoirs on the New River (Claytor and Bluestone Lakes) and Gauley River (Summersville Lake) reduced the estimated 100-year flood discharge under 20th-century climate by about half.

== Recreation ==
=== Fishing ===
Multiple West Virginia state record fish were caught along the Kanawha Falls.
