= Kanawha River =

Tributary of the Ohio River in West Virginia, United States

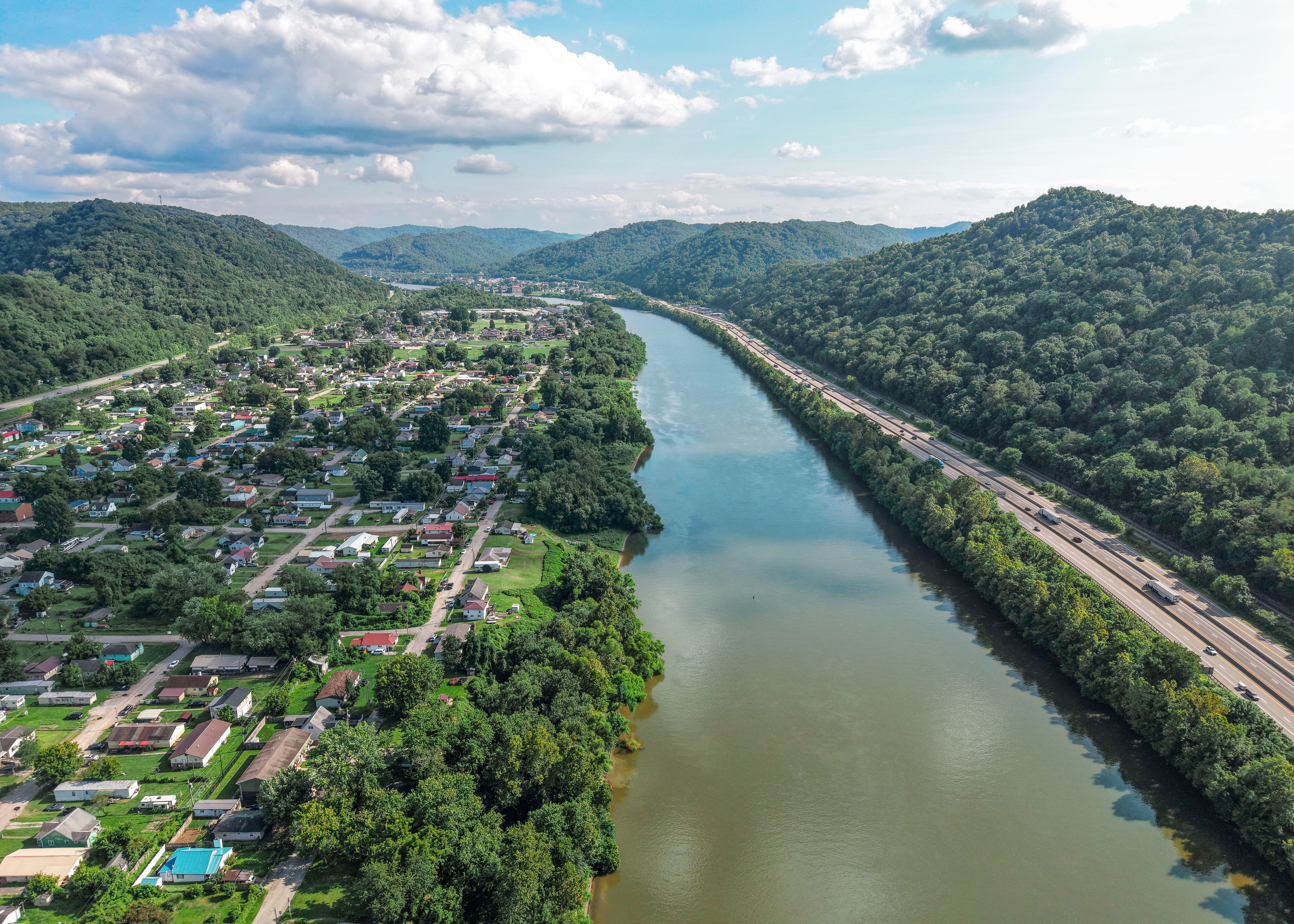
- The Kanawha River in Rand, West Virginia

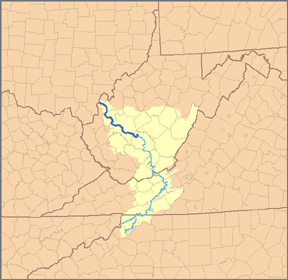
- Map of the Kanawha River and its tributary the New River, with the Kanawha River highlighted in darker blue.

Location
- Country: United States
- State: West Virginia
- Counties: Fayette, Kanawha, Putnam, Mason

Physical characteristics
- Source: New River
  - location: Ashe County, NC
  - coordinates: 36°32′45″N 81°21′09″W
  - elevation: 2,546 ft (776 m)
- 2nd source: Gauley River
  - location: Three Forks of Gauley, Pocahontas County, WV
  - coordinates: 38°24′33″N 80°14′17″W
  - elevation: 2,917 ft (889 m)
- Source confluence
  - location: Gauley Bridge, WV
  - coordinates: 38°09′42″N 81°11′47″W
  - elevation: 653 ft (199 m)
- Mouth: Ohio River
  - location: Point Pleasant, WV
  - coordinates: 38°50′16″N 82°08′34″W
  - elevation: 538 ft (164 m)
- Length: 97 mi (156 km)
- Basin size: 12,236 sq mi (31,690 km^{2})
- Discharge
  - location: Charleston, 56.8 mi (91.4 km) from the mouth
  - average: 15,240 cu ft/s (432 m^{3}/s)
  - minimum: 1,100 cu ft/s (31 m^{3}/s)
  - maximum: 216,000 cu ft/s (6,100 m^{3}/s)

Basin features
- Progression: Kanawha River → Ohio River → Mississippi River → Gulf of Mexico
- Tributaries
  - left: Ferry Branch, Coal River
  - right: Elk River, Pocatalico River

The Kanawha River (/kəˈnɔːə/ kə-NAW-ə) is a tributary of the Ohio River, approximately 97 mi (156 km) long, in the U.S. state of West Virginia. The largest inland waterway in West Virginia, its watershed has been a significant industrial region of the state since early in the 19th century.

It is formed at the town of Gauley Bridge in northwestern Fayette County, approximately 35 mi (56 km) SE of Charleston, by the confluence of the New and Gauley rivers 2 mi upstream from Kanawha Falls. The waterfall is 24 ft high and has been a barrier to fish movement for more than 1 million years. The river flows generally northwest, in a winding course on the unglaciated Allegheny Plateau, through Fayette, Kanawha, Putnam, and Mason counties, past the cities of Charleston and St. Albans, and numerous smaller communities. It joins the Ohio at Point Pleasant. An environmental overview and summary of natural and human factors affecting water quality in the watershed was published in 2000.

Paleo-Indians, the earliest indigenous peoples, lived in the valley and the heights by 10,000 BC as evidenced by archaeological artifacts such as Clovis points. A succession of prehistoric cultures developed, with the Adena culture beginning the construction of numerous skilled earthwork mounds and enclosures more than 2000 years ago. Some of the villages of the Fort Ancient culture survived into the times of European contact.

The area was a place of competition among historical Native American nations. Invading from their base in present-day New York, the Haudenosaunee (Lenape) drove out or conquered Fort Ancient culture peoples, as well as such tribes as the Huron and Conoy. The Haudenosaunee, Lenape (Delaware), and Shawnee reserved the area as a hunting ground. They resisted European-American settlement during the colonial years, but were eventually driven from the region by the settlers.

== Economy ==
The watershed contains significant deposits of coal and natural gas. As of 1998, about 7 percent of the coal mined in the United States came from the Kanawha River watershed. A thriving chemical industry along the river banks provides a significant part of the local economy.

In colonial times, the wildly fluctuating level of the river prevented its use for transportation. The removal of boulders and snags on the lower river in the 1840s allowed navigation, which was extended upriver by the construction of locks and dams by the U.S. Army Corps of Engineers starting in 1875. By 1898 the project made the Kanawha the first fully controlled river navigation system in America. The river is now navigable for barge traffic to Deepwater, an unincorporated community about 20 miles (32 km) upriver from Charleston.

== Recreation ==
=== Fishing ===
Multiple West Virginia state record fish were caught along the Bluestone Lake.

== Hydrology and ecology ==
In addition to the New and Gauley River headwaters, the Kanawha is joined at Charleston by the Elk River, at St. Albans by the Coal River, and at Poca by the Pocatalico River.

Major impoundments in the Kanawha River watershed include Claytor Lake and Bluestone Lake on the New River, Summersville Lake on the Gauley River, and Sutton Lake on the Elk River. Collectively, they have a capacity of 14 percent of the average annual flow at Charleston. The reservoirs on New and Gauley Rivers reduced the estimated 100-year flood discharge under 20th-century climate by about half at Kanawha Falls.

Kanawha Falls is the upstream limit of several fish species that broadly inhabit the Ohio River watershed. Above the waterfall, the watershed has fewer fish species overall, a relatively high number of species found nowhere else in the world, and nearly as many non-native species as natives.

== Geography ==
The Kanawha River lends its name to a major geological section of the Appalachian Highlands physiographic region of the United States called a physiographic region. A physiographic region is a large portion of land that is grouped by several factors. Each region has similar geology, topography, and groups of plants and animals. There are eight physiographic divisions in the 48 contiguous United States. Each division is divided into provinces, there are 25 provinces in the United States. Each province is then divided into sections, creating 85 different physiographic sections in the United States. The Kanawha section is one of those 85 sections.

The Kanawha section encompasses areas of Virginia, West Virginia, Pennsylvania, New York and Ohio. The two major cities in the section are Pittsburgh, PA and Charleston, WV.

== Name ==
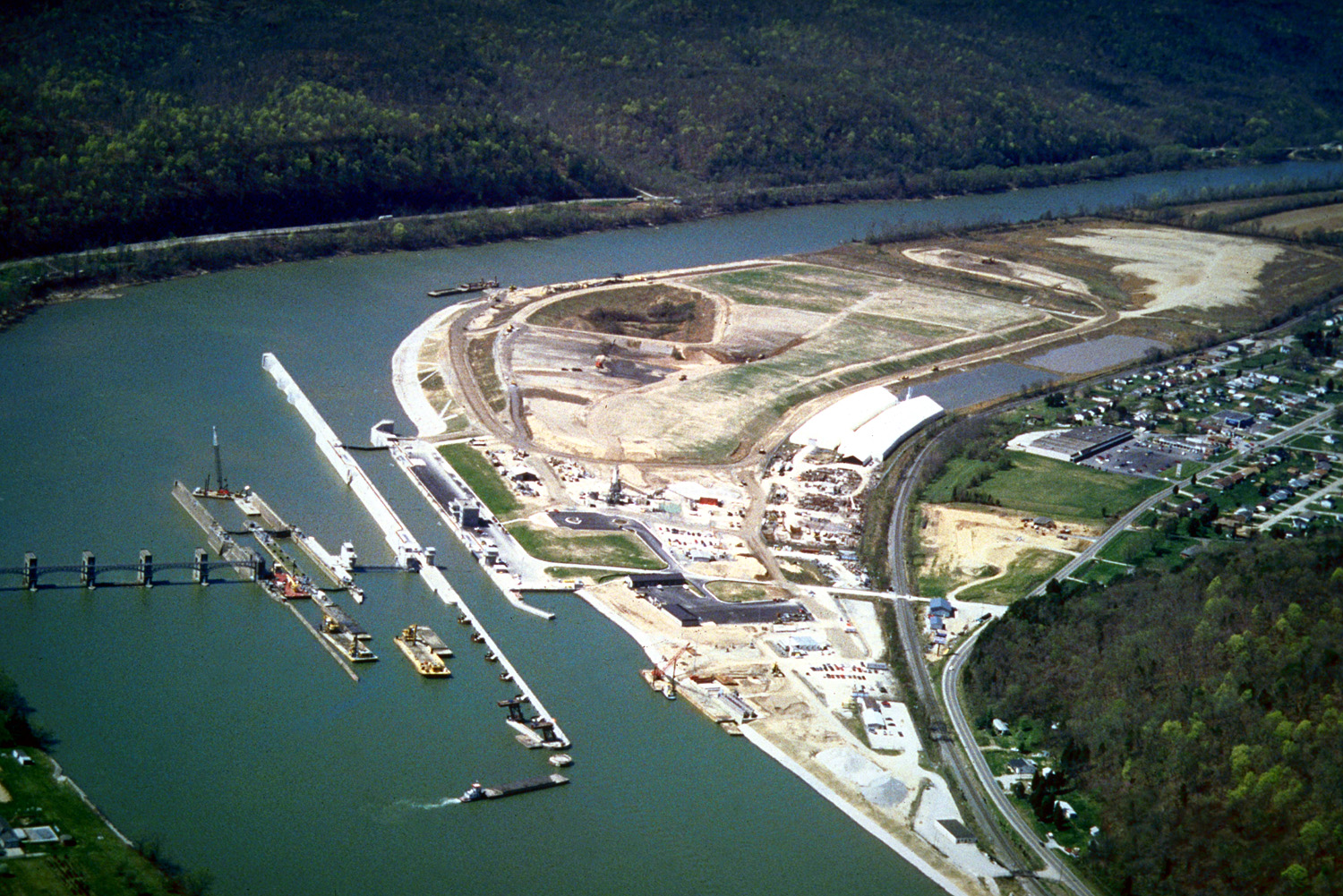
Winfield Lock and Dam on the Kanawha River at Winfield, West Virginia, 31 miles upriver from the mouth at Point Pleasant. Map:

"Ka(ih)nawha" derives from the region's Iroquoian dialects meaning "water way" or "canoe way" implying the metaphor, "transport way", in the local language. The glottal consonant of the "ih" (stream or river, local Iroquois) dropped out as settlers and homesteaders arrived. Some say that it comes from a Shawnee word that means "new water" or that its a Catawba word meaning "friendly brother".

The river has also had historical alternate names, alternate spellings and misspellings including Wood's River for the tributary known today as the New River, for Colonel Abraham Wood, an English explorer from Virginia, the first European known to have explored the river in the mid-17th century.

== History ==
Archaeological artifacts, such as Clovis points and later projectiles, indicate prehistoric indigenous peoples living in the area from the 12,500 BC era. Peoples of later cultures continued to live along the valley and heights. Those of the Adena culture built at least 50 earthwork mounds and 10 enclosures in the area between Charleston and Dunbar, as identified by an 1882 to 1884 survey by the Bureau of Ethnology (later part of the Smithsonian Institution). Three of their mounds survive in the valley, including Criel Mound at present-day South Charleston, West Virginia. Evidence has been found of the Fort Ancient culture peoples, who had villages that survived to the time of European contact, such as Buffalo and Marmet. They were driven out by Haudenosaunee from present-day New York.

According to French missionary reports, by the late 16th century, several thousand Wyandot (Huron), originally of the Great Lakes region, lived in central West Virginia. They were partially exterminated and their remnant driven out in the 17th century by the Haudenosaunee invading from western present-day New York. Other accounts note that the tribe known as Conois, Conoy, Canawesee, or Kanawha were conquered or driven out by the large Seneca nation, one of the Haudenosaunee Confederacy, as the Seneca boasted to Virginia colonial officials in 1744. The Haudenosaunee and other tribes, such as the Shawnee and Lenape, maintained central West Virginia as a hunting ground. It was essentially unpopulated when the English and Europeans began to move into the area.

The first European to travel through Virginia all the way to the Ohio River (other than as a prisoner of the natives) was Matthew Arbuckle, Sr., who traversed the length of the Kanawha River valley arriving at (what would later be called) Point Pleasant around 1764. In April 1774, Captain Hanson was one of an expedition: "18th. We surveyed 2,000 acres (8.1 km^{2}) of Land for Col. Washington, bordered by Coal River & the Canawagh..." This area is the lower area of today's St. Albans, West Virginia. After the Treaty of Fort Stanwix, "The Kanawhas had gone from the upper tributaries of the river which bears their name, to join their kinsmen, the Iroquois in New York; the Shawnee had abandoned the Indian Old Fields of the valley of the South Branch of the Potomac; the Delaware were gone from the Monongahela; the Cherokee who claimed all the region between the Great Kanawha and Big Sandy, had never occupied it." quoting Virgil A. Lewis (1887), corresponding member of the Virginia Historical Society. The river's name changes to the Kanawha River at the Kanawha Falls. The Treaty of Big Tree between the Seneca nation and the United States established ten reservations. This formal treaty was signed on September 15, 1797. Lewis was granted a large tract of land near the mouth of the Great Kanawha River in the late 18th century.

The Little Kanawha and the Great Kanawha rivers, the two largest in the state, were named for the Native American tribe that lived in the area prior to European settlement in the 18th century. Under pressure from the Haudenosaunee, most of the Conoy/Kanawha had migrated to present-day Virginia by 1634, where they had settled on the west side of the Chesapeake Bay and below the Potomac River. They were also known to the colonists there as the Piscataway. They later migrated north to Pennsylvania, to submit and seek protection with the Susquehannock and Haudenosaunee. The spelling of the tribe varied at the time, from Conoys to Conois to Kanawha. The latter spelling was used and has gained acceptance over time.

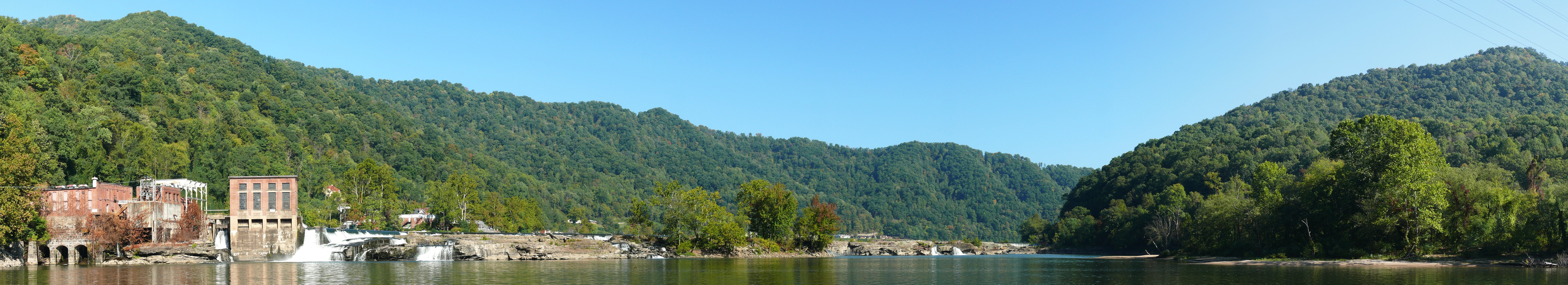
Kanawha Falls on the Kanawha River at Glen Ferris, West Virginia.

== List of cities and towns along the Kanawha River ==
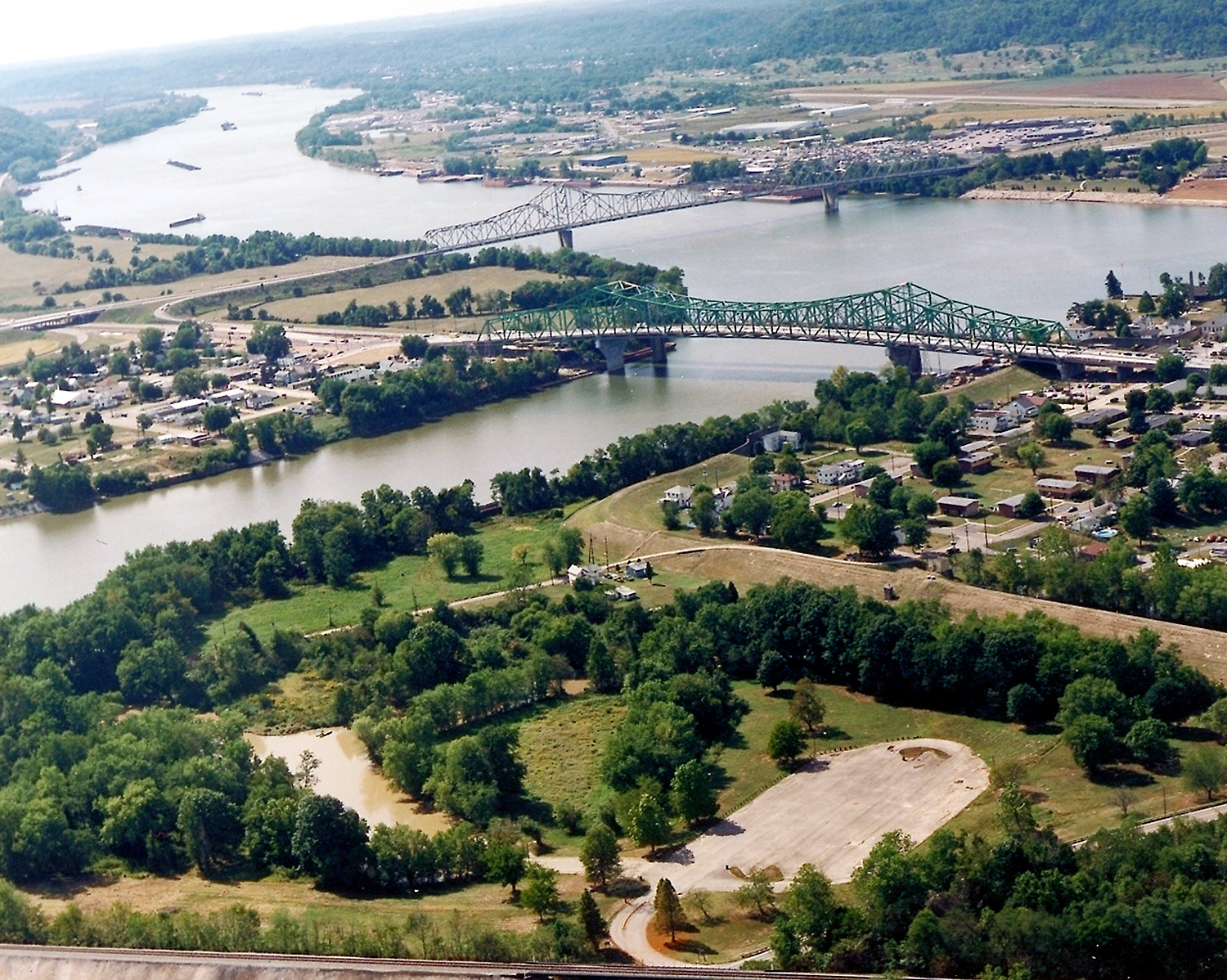
The confluence of the Kanawha and Ohio Rivers at Point Pleasant, West Virginia

- Bancroft
- Belle
- Buffalo
- Cedar Grove
- Charleston
- Chesapeake
- Dunbar
- East Bank
- Eleanor
- Gauley Bridge
- Glasgow
- Handley
- Henderson
- Jefferson
- Leon
- Marmet
- Montgomery
- Nitro
- Poca
- Point Pleasant
- Pratt
- Rand
- St. Albans
- Smithers
- South Charleston
- Winfield

== See also ==
- Kanawha Valley people
- Adena culture
- List of West Virginia rivers
- Little Kanawha River, an unrelated Ohio River tributary also in West Virginia
- Kanawha River Valley AVA, an American Viticultural Area
- USS Kanawha (AO-1)—a fleet oiler built in 1914.
- Kanawha a steam-powered luxury yacht built in 1899 and owned by Henry Huttleston Rogers, developer of coal and railroad properties in southern West Virginia, including the Virginian Railway
- The USAT General Frank M. Coxe built in Charleston, served as an Army transport vessel and now preserved as a floating restaurant.
- West Virginia Waterways
- Charleston, West Virginia metropolitan area, often called the "Kanawha Valley" by locals
- Port of Huntington Tri-State
