= National Register of Historic Places listings in Mercer County, West Virginia =

Location of Mercer County in West Virginia

This is a list of the National Register of Historic Places listings in Mercer County, West Virginia.

This is intended to be a complete list of the properties and districts on the National Register of Historic Places in Mercer County, West Virginia, United States. The locations of National Register properties and districts for which the latitude and longitude coordinates are included below, may be seen in an online map.

There are 20 properties and districts listed on the National Register in the county.

This National Park Service list is complete through NPS recent listings posted March 21, 2025.

Contents: Counties in West Virginia

Barbour - Berkeley - Boone - Braxton - Brooke - Cabell - Calhoun - Clay - Doddridge - Fayette - Gilmer - Grant - Greenbrier - Hampshire - Hancock - Hardy - Harrison - Jackson - Jefferson - Kanawha - Lewis - Lincoln - Logan - Marion - Marshall - Mason - McDowell - Mercer - Mineral - Mingo - Monongalia - Monroe - Morgan - Nicholas - Ohio - Pendleton - Pleasants - Pocahontas - Preston - Putnam - Raleigh - Randolph - Ritchie - Roane - Summers - Taylor - Tucker - Tyler - Upshur - Wayne - Webster - Wetzel - Wirt - Wood - Wyoming

== Current listings ==
	Name on the Register	Image	Date listed	Location	City or town	Description
1	Bluefield Downtown Commercial Historic District	Bluefield Downtown Commercial Historic District	March 18, 1987 (#87000630)	Roughly bounded by Princeton Ave. and Scott, High, and Russell Sts. 37°16′04″N 81°13′18″W	Bluefield	
2	Bluefield Green Book Historic District		July 24, 2024 (#100010606)	1039-1047 Wayne Street; 37°16′25″N 81°12′59″W	Bluefield	
3	Bramwell Historic District	Bramwell Historic District	February 10, 1983 (#83003244)	Main, Rose, Bloch, Duhring, Wyatt, Church, and N. and S. River Sts. 37°19′26″N 81°18′35″W	Bramwell	
4	Bramwell Additions Historic District	Bramwell Additions Historic District	August 3, 1995 (#95000877)	Along Bluestone Ave. SW of US 92, also two discontiguous areas N and W along the Bluestone R.; Parts of Bluestone Ave., Clifton St., Renova St., Simmons Ave., Simmons St. and Spring St. 37°19′26″N 81°18′15″W	Bramwell	
5	Country Club Hill Historic District		November 5, 1992 (#92000878)	Along Whitethorn, Lebanon and Liberty Sts. 37°14′56″N 81°14′00″W	Bluefield	
6	Easley House	Easley House	July 29, 1992 (#92000879)	1500 College Ave. 37°15′01″N 81°14′12″W	Bluefield	
7	First Baptist Church of Bluefield		August 8, 2023 (#100009142)	100 Duhring St. 37°16′04″N 81°13′34″W	Bluefield	
8	Col. William Henderson French House		March 12, 1976 (#76001940)	South of Athens off WV 20; 37°23′46″N 81°01′36″W	Athens	
9	Dr. James W. Hale House	Dr. James W. Hale House	March 12, 1976 (#76001941)	1034 Mercer St. 37°22′06″N 81°05′54″W	Princeton	
10	Hancock House	Hancock House	January 17, 1990 (#89001783)	300 Sussex St. 37°16′33″N 81°13′13″W	Bluefield	
11	Jefferson Street Historic District	Jefferson Street Historic District	July 29, 1992 (#92000877)	Along Jefferson St. between Cumberland Rd. and College Ave. 37°15′05″N 81°13′02″W	Bluefield	
12	Dr. Robert B. McNutt House	Dr. Robert B. McNutt House	July 25, 2001 (#01000777)	1522 N. Walker St. 37°22′02″N 81°06′10″W	Princeton	
13	Mercer County Courthouse	Mercer County Courthouse	November 28, 1980 (#80004032)	Courthouse Sq. 37°21′56″N 81°06′12″W	Princeton	
14	Mercer Street Historic District	Mercer Street Historic District	October 17, 2003 (#03001060)	Mercer St. between N. 1st St. and North St. 37°22′13″N 81°05′15″W	Princeton	
15	Municipal Building	Municipal Building	May 29, 1979 (#79002591)	514 Bland St. 37°16′04″N 81°13′22″W	Bluefield	
16	President's House, Bluefield State College		December 3, 1999 (#99001400)	Rock St. 37°16′04″N 81°14′09″W	Bluefield	
17	Princeton Post Office		July 6, 2020 (#100005316)	920 Mercer St. 37°22′11″N 81°05′46″W	Princeton	Now houses the Princeton Public Library.
18	South Bluefield Historic District	South Bluefield Historic District	July 29, 1992 (#92000876)	Along Mountain View Rd., Bland Rd., Oakhurst, and Parkway; 37°15′29″N 81°12′55″W	Bluefield	
19	Upper Oakhurst Historic District	Upper Oakhurst Historic District	July 29, 1992 (#92000875)	Along Oakhurst Ave., Groveland Dr., Edgewood Rd., and Mountain View Rd. 37°15′45″N 81°12′22″W	Bluefield	
20	Virginian Railway Yard Historic District		May 1, 2003 (#03000351)	0.5 mi (0.80 km) north of junction of WV 20 and railroad tracks 37°22′41″N 81°05′11″W	Princeton	

== See also ==
- List of National Historic Landmarks in West Virginia
- National Register of Historic Places listings in West Virginia
