= List of United States post offices in West Virginia =

United States post offices operate under the authority of the United States Post Office Department (1792–1971) or the United States Postal Service (since 1971). Historically, post offices were usually placed in a prominent location. Many were architecturally distinctive, including notable buildings featuring Beaux-Arts, Art Deco, and Vernacular architecture. However, modern U.S. post offices were generally designed for functionality rather than architectural style.

Following is a list of United States post offices in West Virginia. Notable post offices include individual buildings, whether still in service or not, which have architectural, historical, or community-related significance. Many of these are listed on the National Register of Historic Places (NRHP) or state and local historic registers.

Post office	City	Date built	Image	Architect	Notes	Ref.
Blackman–Bosworth Store, now Randolph County Museum	Beverly	c. 1828, 1894		unknown	(Note: Listed on the National Register of Historic Places.) (Note: No longer used as a post office.)	
Carter Coal Company Store (Caretta, West Virginia)	Caretta	1912		unknown		
Carter Coal Company Store (Coalwood, West Virginia)	Coalwood	1912		unknown	(Note: Building has been demolished.)	
Masonic Temple (Fairmont, West Virginia)	Fairmont	1906–1907		Baldwin & Pennington		
Itmann Company Store and Office	Itmann	1923–1925		Alex B. Mahood		
Pocahontas Fuel Company Store and Office Buildings	Jenkinjones	1917		Alex B. Mahood		
United States Post Office and Court House (Huntington, West Virginia)	Huntington	1907		Parker & Thomas		
United States Court House & Post Office (now Federal Aviation Administration Records Center)	Martinsburg	1892		Willoughby J. Edbrooke		
Old Morgantown Post Office (aka Monongalia Arts Center)	Morgantown	1913		Oscar Wenderoth		
First National Bank-Graham Building	New Cumberland	1903		unknown		
Page Coal and Coke Company Store	Pageton	1914		Alex B. Mahood		
Prince Brothers General Store	Prince	1900		unknown		
U.S. Coal and Coke Company Store	Ream	1910		unknown		
St. Albans Post Office	St. Albans	1937		Louis A. Simon, Neal A. Melick		
Pocahontas Fuel Company Store (Switchback, West Virginia)	Switchback	1917		Alex B. Mahood		
Peerless Coal Company Store	Vivian	1921		Alex B. Mahood		
Whipple Company Store	Whipple	c. 1900		Whipple Colliery Co.		
