= Alex B. Mahood =

American architect (1888–1970)

- Born: Alexander Blount Mahood; March 17, 1888; Lynchburg, Virginia, United States
- Died: December 25, 1970 (aged 82); Bluefield, West Virginia, United States
- Occupation: Architect

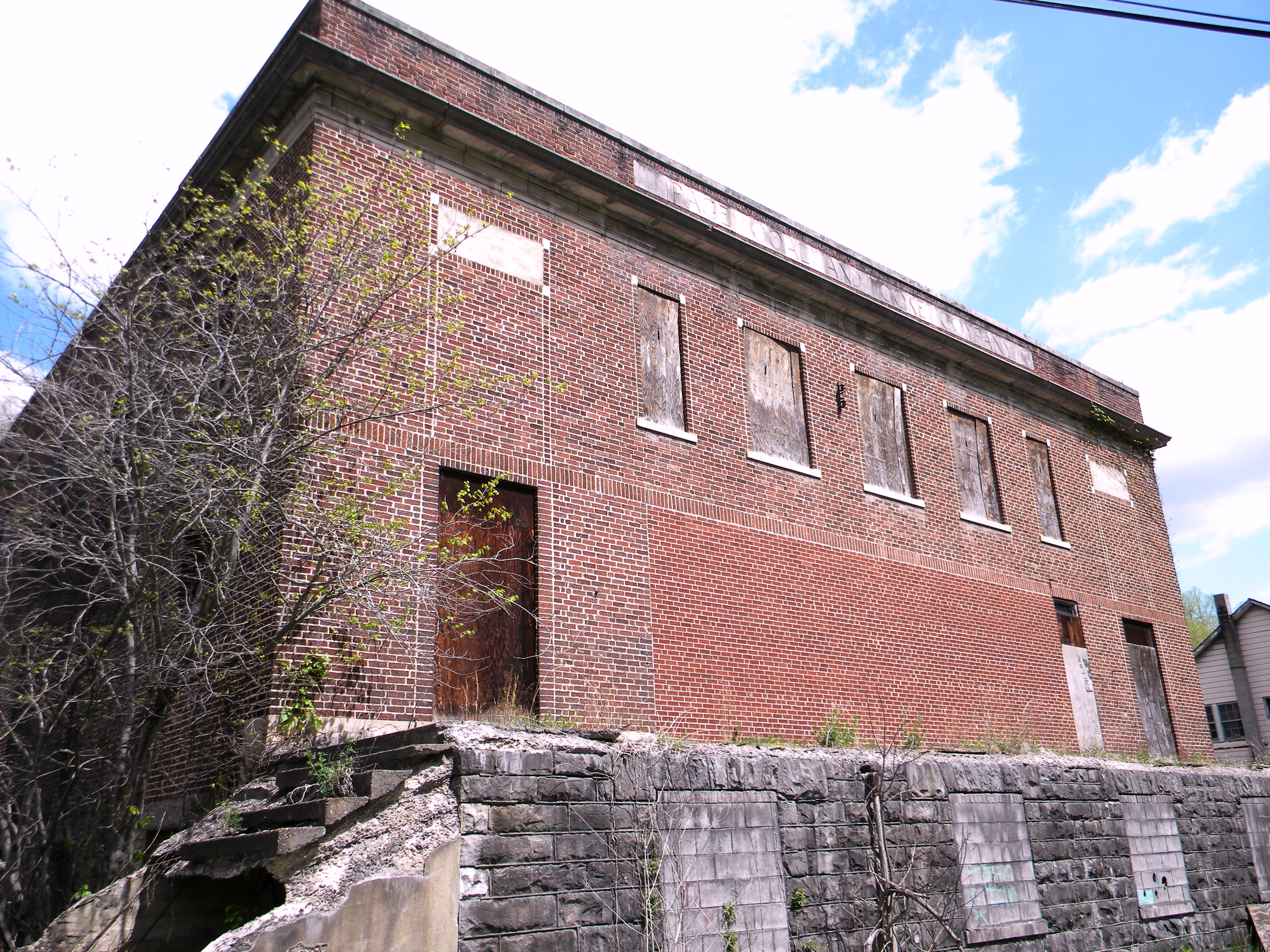
Page Coal and Coke Company Store, Pageton, 1914.

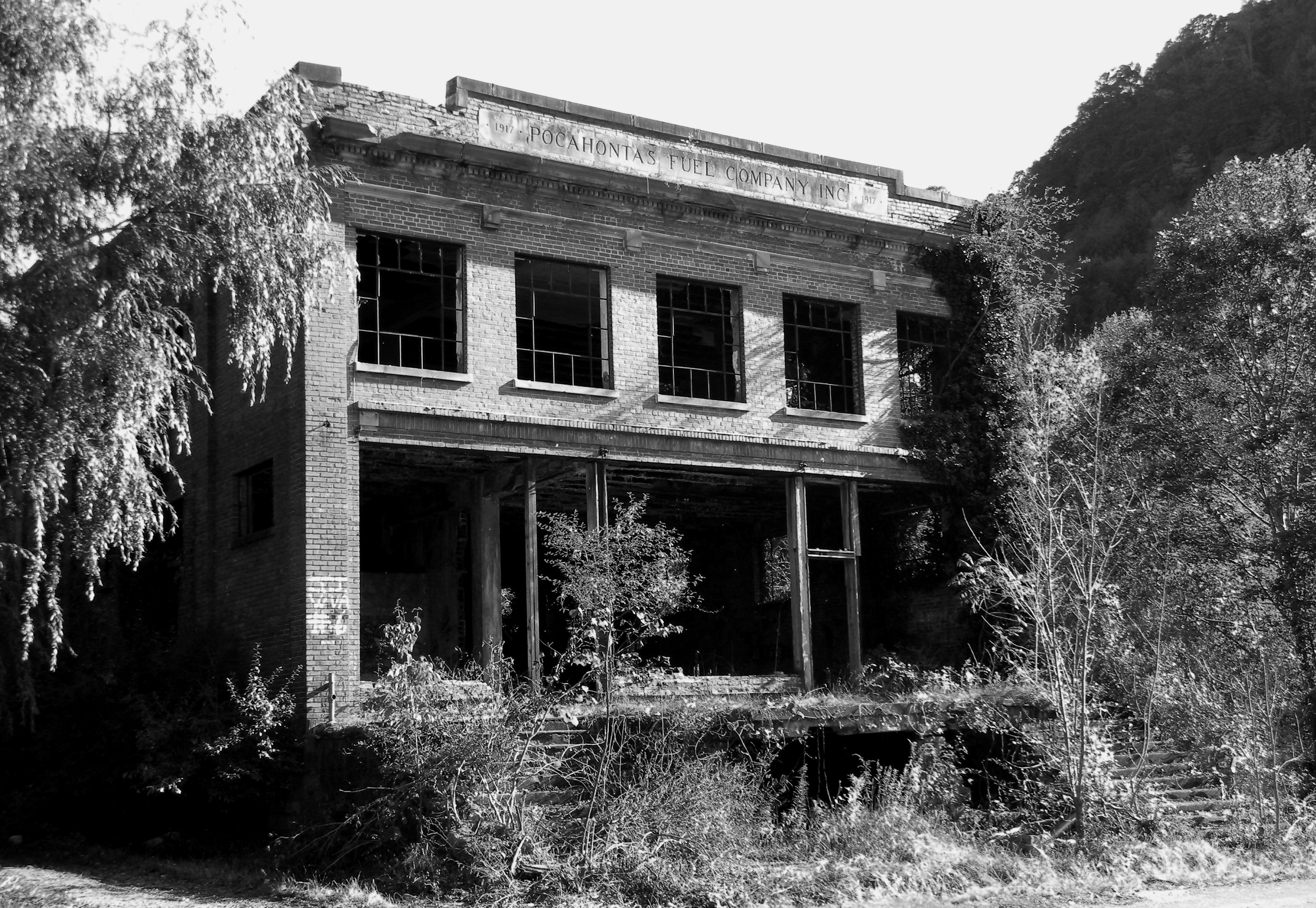
Pocahontas Fuel Company Store, Jenkinjones, 1917.

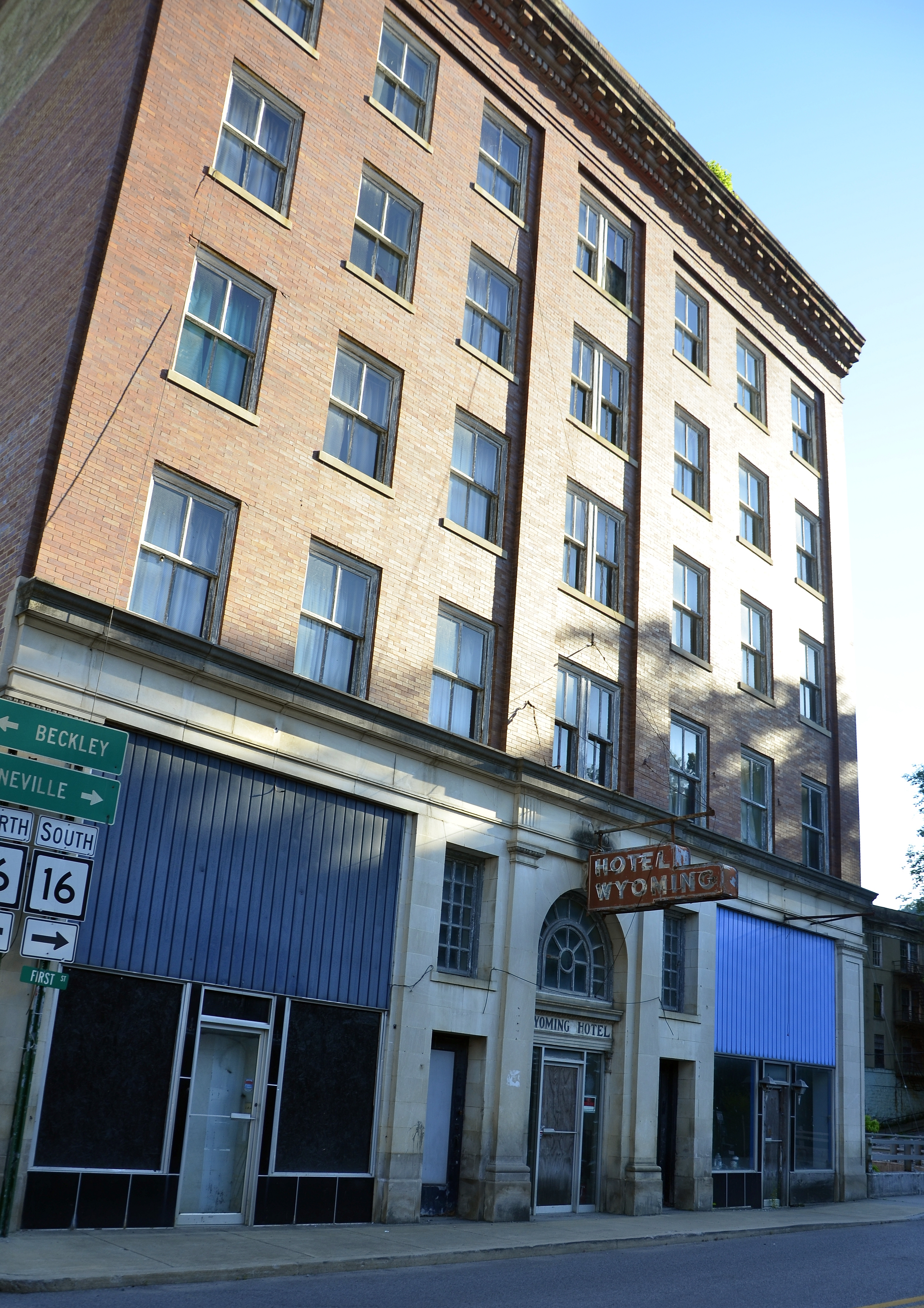
Wyoming Hotel, Mullens, 1918.

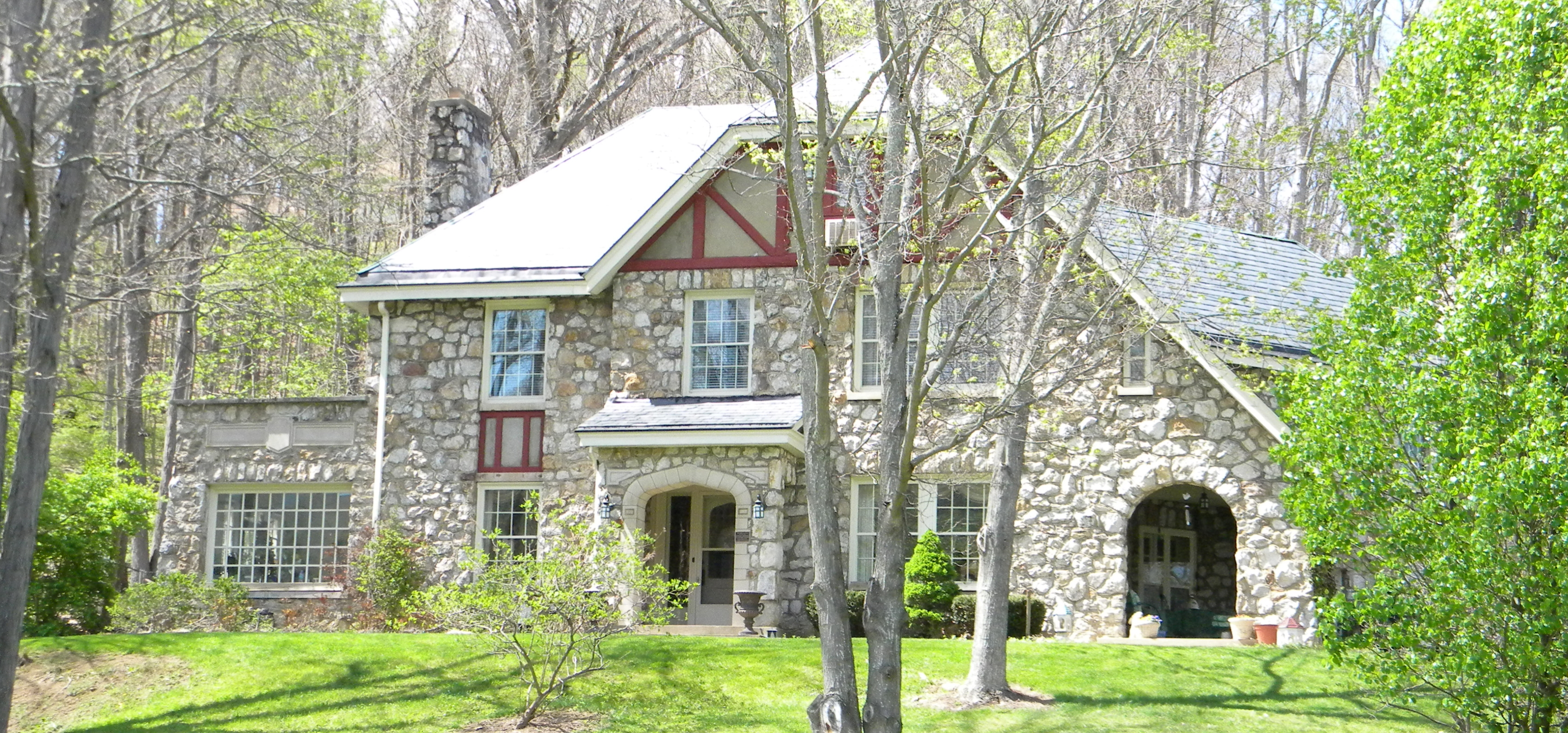
Frank S. Easley House, Bluefield, 1919.

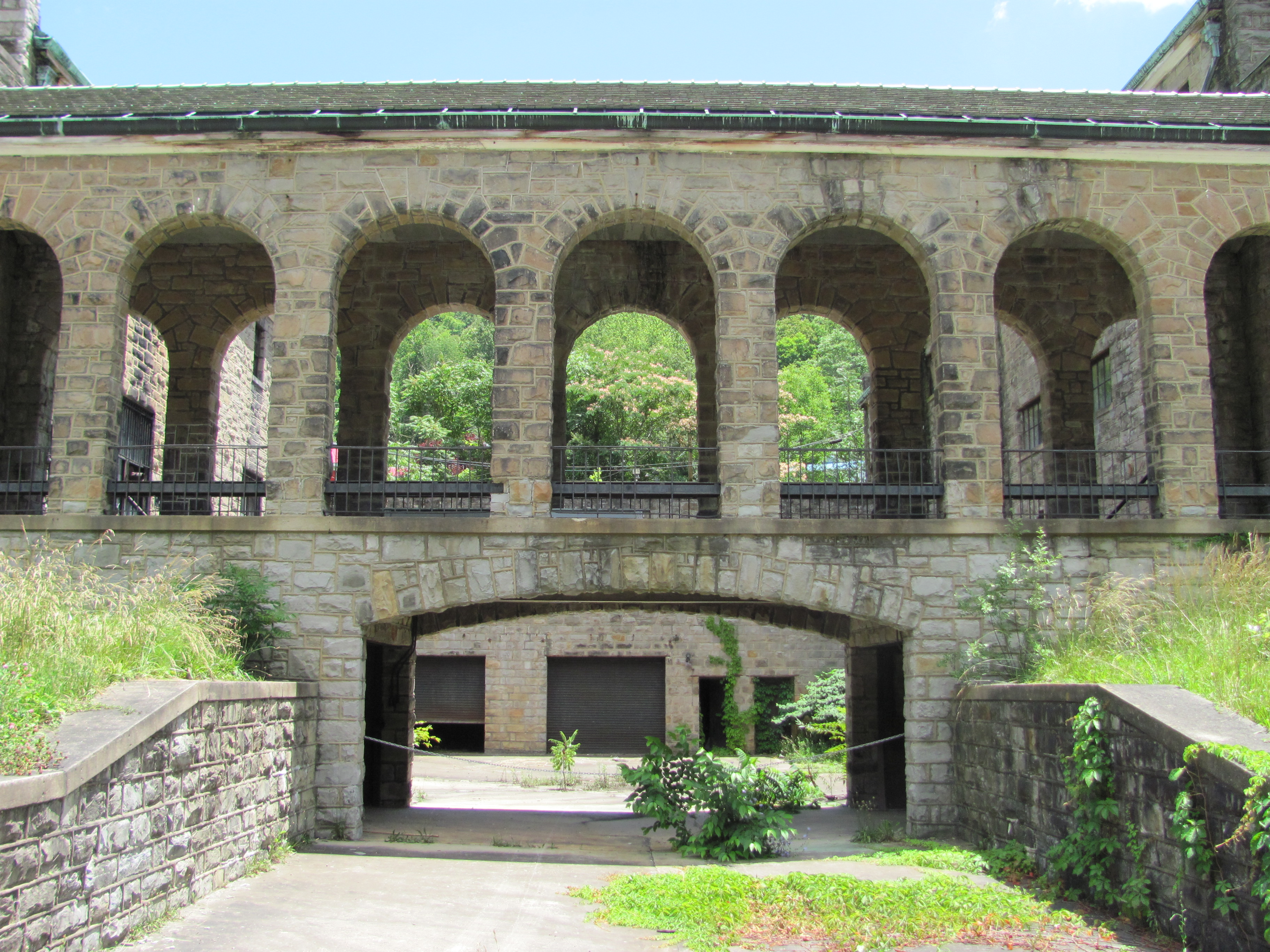
Itmann Company Store, Itmann, 1923.

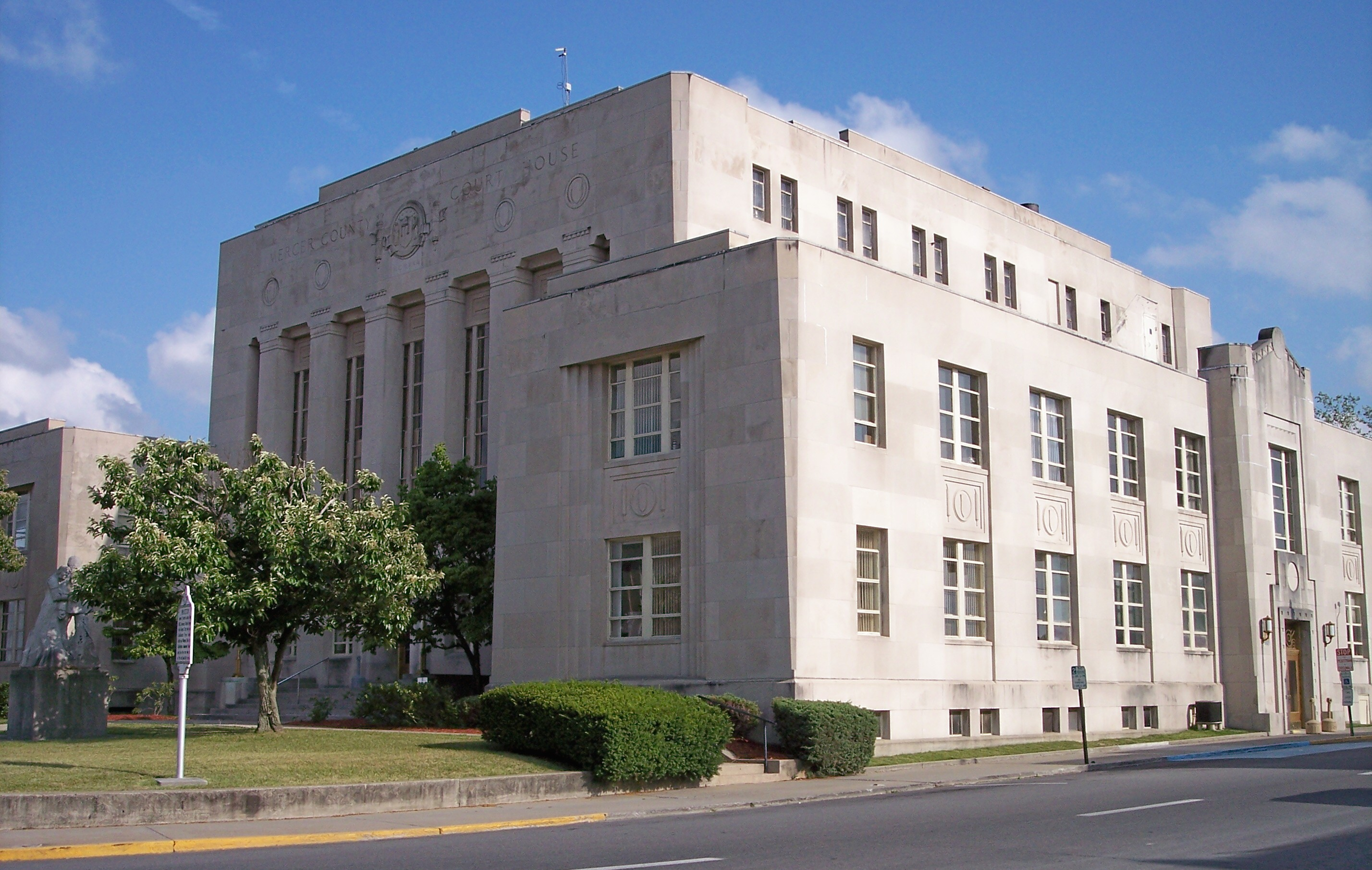
County Courthouse, Princeton, 1930.

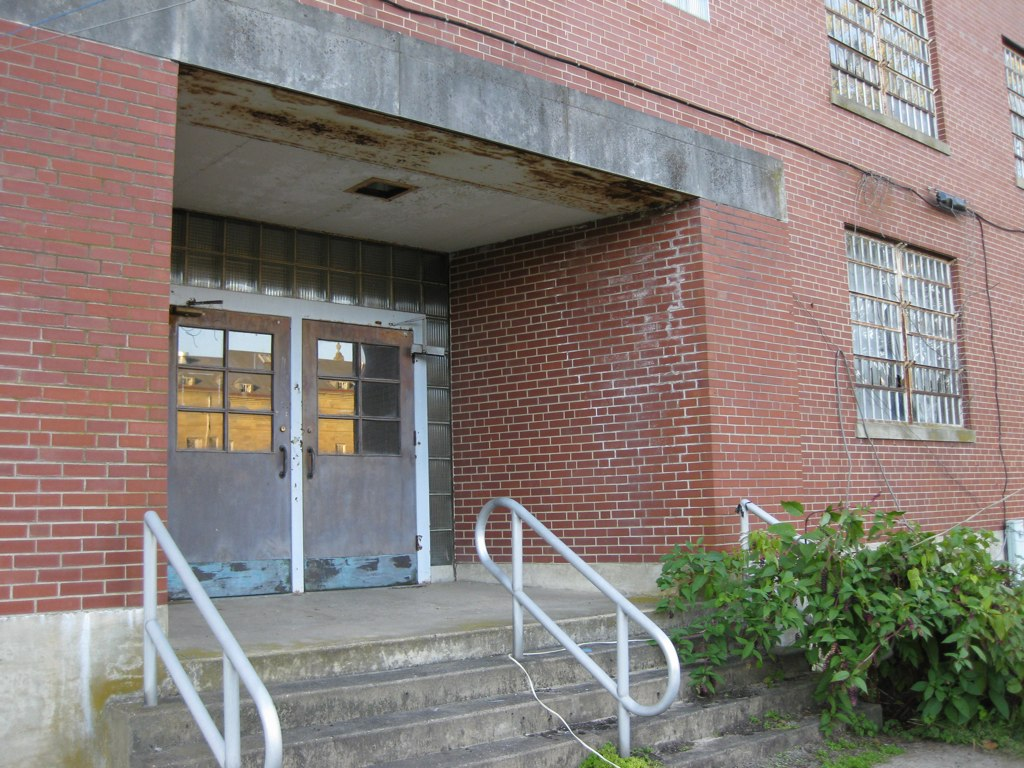
Geriatrics Building, Weston State Hospital, 1950.

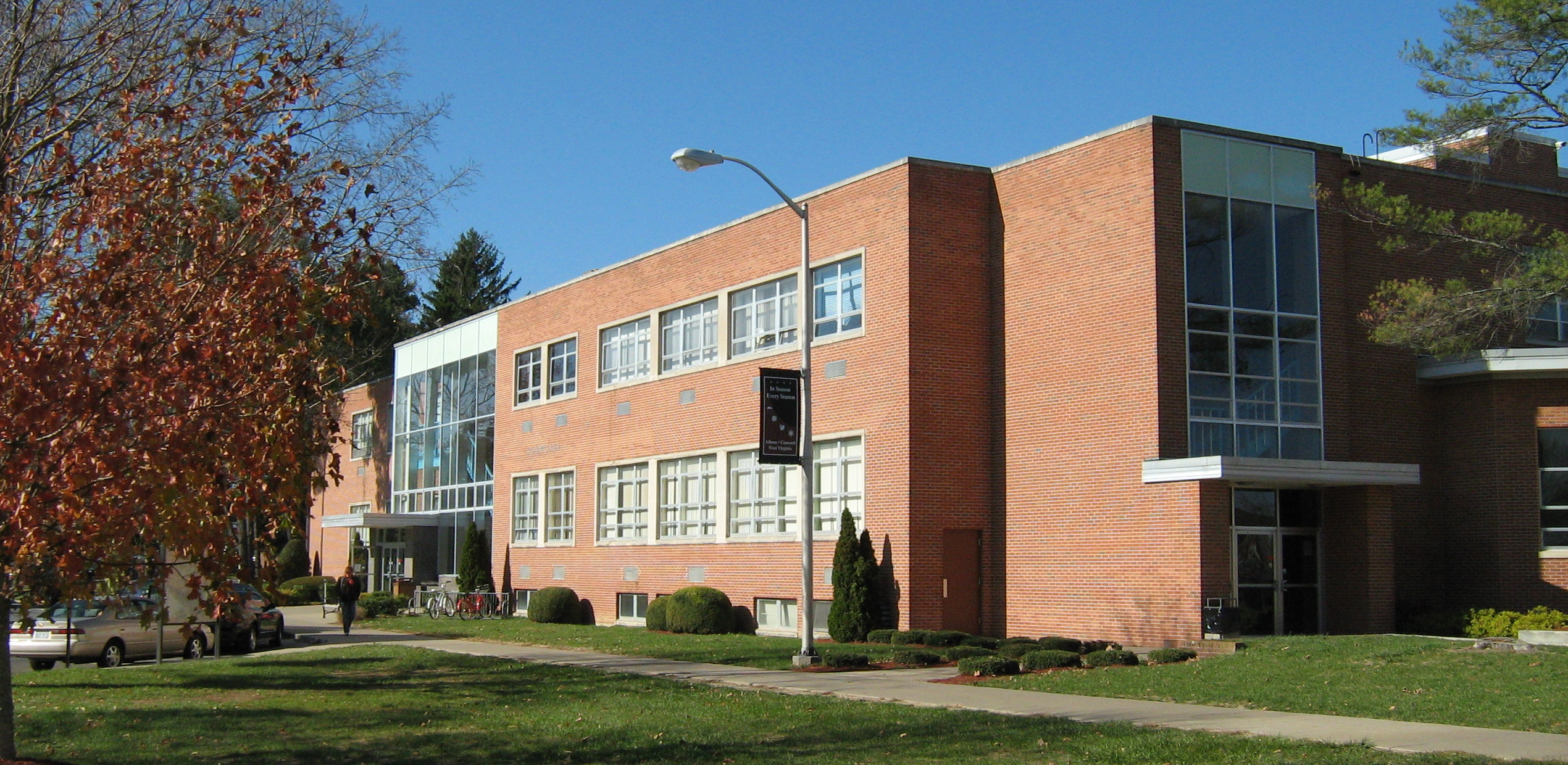
Student Center, Concord University, 1962.

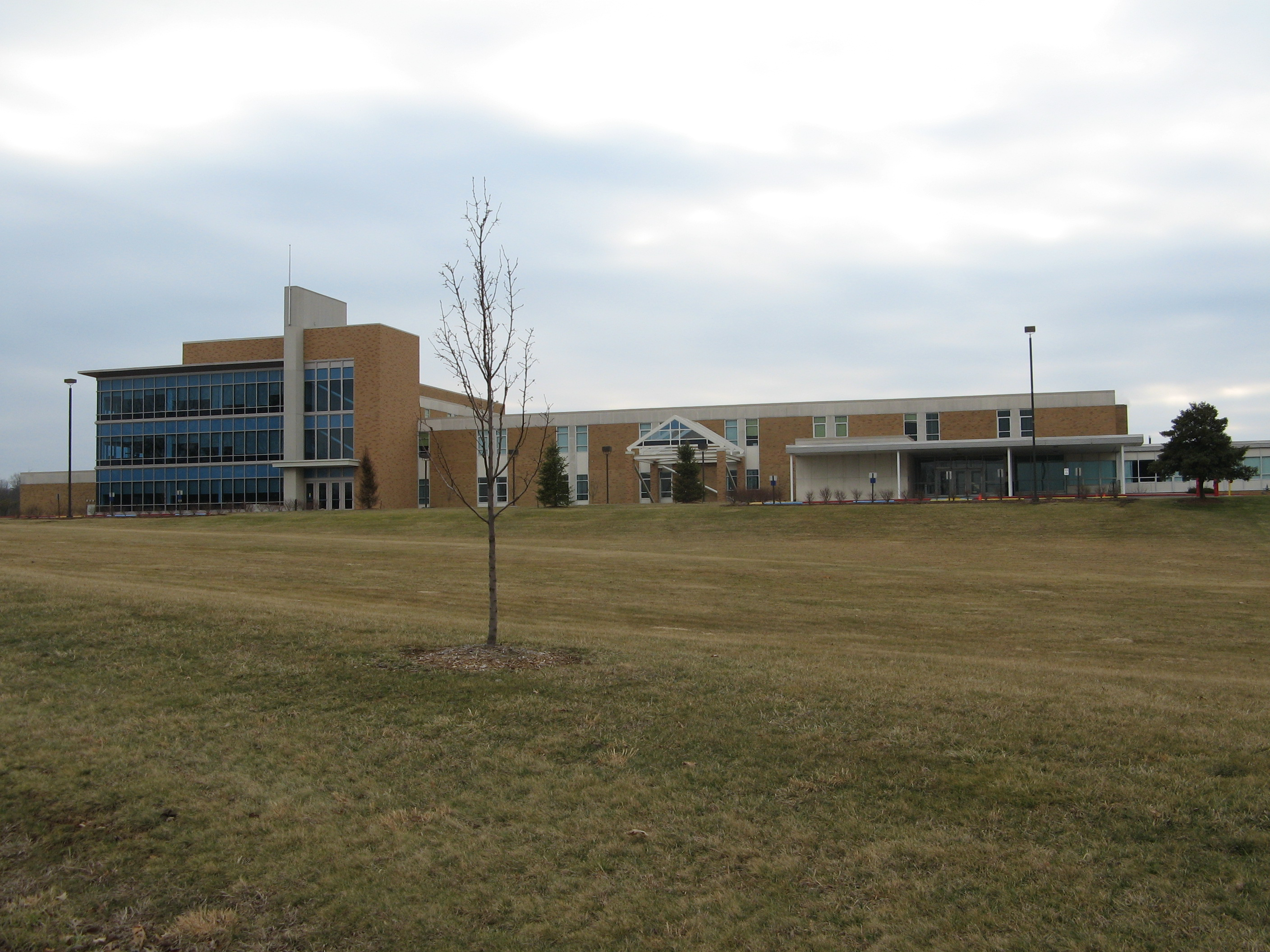
Main Building, West Virginia University at Parkersburg, 1967.

Alexander Blount Mahood (March 17, 1888 – December 25, 1970) was a Bluefield, West Virginia-based architect.

== Life and career ==
Mahood was born in Lynchburg, Virginia in 1888. He attended public schools, after which he attended the École des Beaux-Arts in Paris and studied in the ateliers of Mssrs. Chifflot and Duquesne. After his return from France in 1911, he took a position as draftsman in the Lynchburg firm of Frye & Chesterman. He soon made his way to Roanoke, where he also worked for Henry H. Huggins and Homer M. Miller. In 1912 Miller elevated Mahood to a partner, in Miller & Mahood. Miller had, in 1911, landed a major commission in nearby Bluefield, the Law & Commerce Building - the largest office building in the growing city. Mahood was sent to Bluefield to open a branch office, where he would supervise construction and court new business.

Upon its completion in 1913, the Mahood offices were moved into the new Law & Commerce Building. The partnership with Miller was dissolved in 1914, and Mahood remained in Bluefield. He remained in private practice until 1923, when he established a partnership with Frederick C. Van Dusen, which lasted until 1926. He was again alone until 1940, when he added Richard T. Snellings of Charlottesville as an associate. His son, A. B. Mahood, Jr. was also made an associate, in 1949. The firm would remain as such until 1970, when Mahood died.

== Legacy ==
Mahood was the architect for the West Virginia Hotel (1923) and many of his major residential works are in the South Bluefield area. These included the Country Club and the Country Club Hill section where the Bluefield Club was constructed in 1920. Mahood designed mansions for magnates of the southern coalfields, and embellished Bluefield's residential districts with some of the grandest Georgian Revival houses in the state.

He designed the Women's Dormitory at the West Virginia University in Morgantown, United States Steel Building in Gary, Skyway Drive-In Theater in Brush Fork, the Deco-Style Mercer County Courthouse (1930–1931) in Princeton and the Guyan Theater in Logan. He also designed a number of coal company offices and stores in the southern West Virginia region. He may have also designed the McNeer House (1919) near Salt Sulphur Springs, West Virginia.

He died in 1970, at Bluefield, West Virginia.

== Selected works ==
=== Miller & Mahood, 1912-1914 ===
- 1912 - Masonic Temple, 203 Federal St, Bluefield, West Virginia
  - Demolished.

=== Alex. B. Mahood, 1914-1923 ===
- 1914 - Page Coal and Coke Company Store, Pageton St, Pageton, West Virginia
  - Listed on the National Register of Historic Places in 1992.
- 1915 - R. M. Garrett House, 109 Spring Grove Ave, Bluefield, West Virginia
- 1915 - Alex B. Mahood House, 2306 Bland Rd, Bluefield, West Virginia
  - The architect's own residence.
- 1916 - The Baldwin House for W.G. Baldwin 126 Summers Street. (Mahood Papers, Eastern Regional Coal Archives)
- 1916 - D. H. Barger House, 2009 Bland Rd, Bluefield, West Virginia
- 1917 - Pocahontas Fuel Company Store, Powerhouse Hill Rd, Switchback, West Virginia
  - Listed on the National Register of Historic Places in 1992.
- 1917 - Pocahontas Fuel Company Store, Jenkinjones Mountain Rd, Jenkinjones, West Virginia
  - Listed on the National Register of Historic Places in 1992.
- 1918 - Wyoming Hotel, 1st St, Mullens, West Virginia
- 1919 - Frank S. Easley House, 1500 College Ave, Bluefield, West Virginia
  - Listed on the National Register of Historic Places in 1992.
- 1919 - D. E. French House, 200 Duhring St, Bluefield, West Virginia
- 1919 - Glen Alum Coal Company Store, Glen Alum, West Virginia
  - Demolished.
- 1919 - Lewis C. McNeer House, 22317 Seneca Trail S, Salt Sulphur Springs, West Virginia
  - Attributed to Mahood.
- 1919 - Ross House, 1917 Jefferson St, Bluefield, West Virginia
- 1920 - Bluefield Elks Country Club, 1501 Whitethorn St, Bluefield, West Virginia
- 1920 - Christ Episcopal Church, 200 Duhring St, Bluefield, West Virginia
- 1920 - First Presbyterian Church, 151 Virginia Ave, Welch, West Virginia
- 1920 - Henry Hotel, 50 E Church St, Martinsville, Virginia
- 1920 - McDowell County Memorial Building, Elkhorn St, Welch, West Virginia
  - Burned.
- 1920 - John Stewart Memorial M. E. Church, 102 Jones St, Bluefield, West Virginia
- 1920 - L. G. Toney House, 2116 Reid Ave, Bluefield, West Virginia
- 1921 - Peerless Coal Company Store, Vivian Bottom Rd, Vivian, West Virginia
  - Listed on the National Register of Historic Places in 1992.
- 1922 - Commercial Bank Building, 401 Federal St, Bluefield, West Virginia
- 1922 - Arthur Kingdon House, 625 Mountain View Ave, Bluefield, West Virginia
- 1923 - Merchants' and Miners' National Bank Building, 8 Wyoming St, Welch, West Virginia
- 1923 - Itmann Company Store and Office, WV-10, Itmann, West Virginia
  - Listed on the National Register of Historic Places in 1990.

=== Mahood & Van Dusen, 1923-1926 ===
- 1923 - West Virginian Hotel, 415 Federal St, Bluefield, West Virginia
- 1924 - W. A. Bodell House, 1430 Whitehorn St, Bluefield, West Virginia
- 1924 - Leonard House, 2002 Jefferson St, Bluefield, West Virginia
- 1924 - Prichard School (former), 2619 Raceview Dr, Ona, West Virginia
- 1925 - Thomas H. Cooper House, 909 Edgewood Rd, Bluefield, West Virginia
- 1925 - Russell F. Ritz House, 908 Edgewood Rd, Bluefield, West Virginia
- 1925 - Memorial School, 319 Memorial Ave, Bluefield, West Virginia
- 1926 - National Armature and Electric Building, 2 Pine St, Bluefield, West Virginia

=== Alex. B. Mahood, 1926-1970 ===
- 1926 - Edgar S. Pedigo House, 105 Oakhurst Ave, Bluefield, West Virginia
- 1926 - John T. Wilson House, 404 Oakhurst Ave, Bluefield, West Virginia
- 1928 - Arthur Kingdon House, 618 Mountain View Ave, Bluefield, West Virginia
- 1929 - Perry Building, 525 Bland St, Bluefield, West Virginia
- 1930 - Mercer County Courthouse, 1501 Main St, Princeton, West Virginia
  - Listed on the National Register of Historic Places in 1980.
- 1934 - U. S. Post Office (former), 400 Neville St, Beckley, West Virginia
  - In association with Samuel H. Bridge, a Beckley architect.
- 1937 - Mahood Hall, Bluefield State College, Bluefield, West Virginia
  - Built as a dormitory, now the College of Business.
- 1938 - Edward S. Maclin Hall, West Virginia Institute of Technology, Montgomery, West Virginia
- 1938 - Wendell G. Hardway Library, Bluefield State College, Bluefield, West Virginia
- 1939 - John Baker White Hall, Concord University, Athens, West Virginia
  - Demolished in 2004.
- 1941 - Conley Hall, West Virginia Institute of Technology, Montgomery, West Virginia
- 1947 - Norfolk and Western Division Office Building, 800 Princeton Ave, Bluefield, West Virginia
- 1949 - Scott Street Garage, Scott St, Bluefield, West Virginia
  - Demolished.
- 1950 - Geriatrics Building, Weston State Hospital, Weston, West Virginia
- 1950 - Guyan Theatre (former), 204 Main St, Logan, West Virginia
- 1952 - Stoco High School (former), 1868 Tingler Ave, Coal City, West Virginia
- Partially demolished.
- 1955 - Princeton High School (former), 300 N Johnston St, Princeton, West Virginia
- 1956 - Arnold Hall, West Virginia University, Morgantown, West Virginia
- 1958 - Parish House for Christ Episcopal Church, 200 Duhring St, Bluefield, West Virginia
- 1962 - Student Center, Concord University, Athens, West Virginia
- 1963 - Boreman Hall North, West Virginia University, Morgantown, West Virginia
- 1964 - Creative Arts Center, West Virginia University, Morgantown, West Virginia
- 1964 - Wilson and Wooddell Halls, Concord University, Athens, West Virginia
- 1966 - Brooke and Braxton Towers, West Virginia University, Morgantown, West Virginia
- 1967 - Main Building, West Virginia University at Parkersburg, Parkersburg, West Virginia
