= Jefferson Street Historic District =

Jefferson Street Historic District may refer to:

- Jefferson Street Historic District (Gary, Indiana)
- Jefferson Street Historic District (Iowa City, Iowa), listed on the National Register of Historic Places in Johnson County, Iowa
- Jefferson Street Historic District (Brownsville, Tennessee), listed on the National Register of Historic Places in Haywood County, Tennessee
- Jefferson Street Historic District (Bluefield, West Virginia), listed on the National Register of Historic Places in Mercer County, West Virginia
