= McNeer House =

Historic house in West Virginia, United States

- U.S. National Register of Historic Places
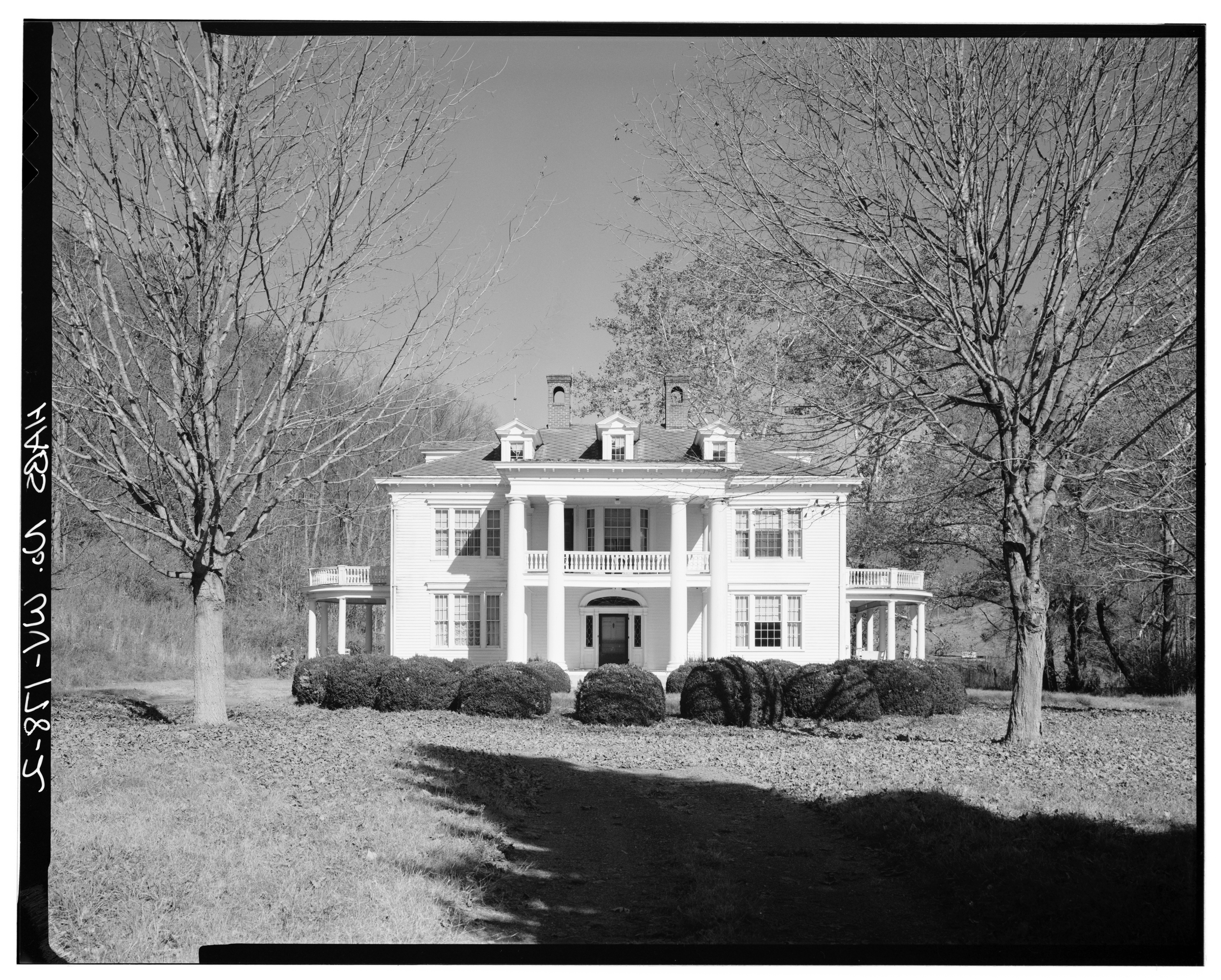
- The house in 1974

- Location within West Virginia Location within the United States
- Location: U.S. Route 219 at Gin Run, near Salt Sulphur Springs, West Virginia
- Coordinates: 37°34′25″N 80°34′3″W
- Area: 8 acres (3.2 ha)
- Built: 1919
- Built by: E. Grier Kendell
- Architect: Alex B. Mahood (uncertain)
- Architectural style: Colonial Revival
- NRHP reference No.: 91000453
- Added to NRHP: April 26, 1991

McNeer House is a historic home located near Salt Sulphur Springs, Monroe County, West Virginia. It was built in 1919, and is a 2 1/2-story white frame dwelling in the Colonial Revival style. It has a rear service area that features a two-story, U-shaped wing with a one-story rear portico with Doric order columns between the arms of the U. It features a two-story flat-roofed portico supported by four Doric columns, across the central bay of the front elevation. The house was built by E. Grier Kendall, but may have been designed by Alex B. Mahood from nearby Bluefield, West Virginia. It is the largest residential building in Monroe County. For a short time after World War II, the McNeer House became the "Lotus Club," perhaps Monroe County's only nightclub.

It was listed on the National Register of Historic Places in 1991.
