= Jefferson Street =

Jefferson Street may refer to:

- Jefferson Street (Nashville), Tennessee
- Jefferson Street (Savannah, Georgia)
- Jefferson Street Cemetery, in Ellicottville, New York
- Jefferson Street Grounds, a defunct baseball field in Philadelphia, Pennsylvania
- Jefferson Street Historic District (disambiguation)
- Jefferson Street station, of the New York City Subway
