= Beckley Courthouse Square Historic District =

Historic district in West Virginia, United States

- U.S. National Register of Historic Places
- U.S. Historic district
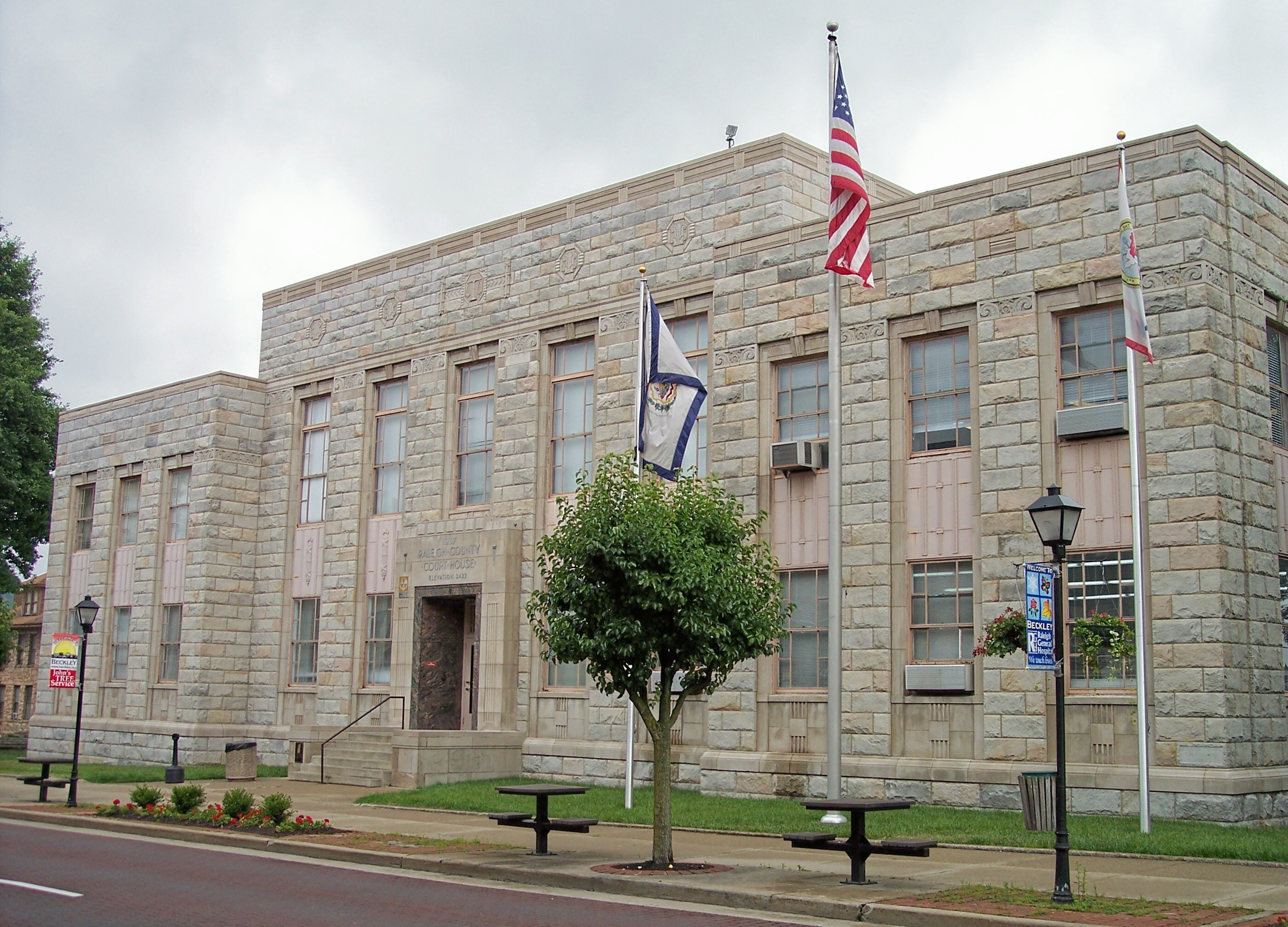
- Raleigh County Courthouse, July 2007

- Location within West Virginia Location within the United States
- Location: Roughly bounded by Prince, Kanawha, Church, Lebanon, Howe, McCreery and Earwood Sts. and Alaska and First Aves., Beckley, West Virginia
- Coordinates: 37°46′36″N 81°11′16″W
- Area: 70 acres (28 ha)
- Architect: Mahood, Alex B., et al.; Multiple
- NRHP reference No.: 94000722
- Added to NRHP: August 31, 1994

The Beckley Courthouse Square Historic District is a 70-acre (28 ha) historic district in Beckley, West Virginia, United States that is listed on the National Register of Historic Places in 1994.

The listing included 100 contributing buildings, including one or more designed by architect Alex B. Mahood.

In a 2010 interview, David Sibray, chairman of the Beckley Historic Landmarks Commission, said the commission's purpose is to protect the city's historic resources, and it oversees the development of downtown Beckley's [historic district]. Sibray noted there are several motivations for preserving Beckley's history, including maintaining the historic aesthetic.

In 2015 the Preservation Alliance of West Virginia (PAWV) declared the district among the most endangered historic resources in West Virginia. The recognition was the result of years of inappropriate alterations to contributing buildings in the district, which the State Historic Preservation Office concluded had threatened the district's integrity. The alliance declared in its assessment that the threat was the result of the nonfeasance of the city landmarks commission.
