= Salt Sulphur Springs Historic District =

Historic district in West Virginia, United States

- U.S. National Register of Historic Places
- U.S. Historic district
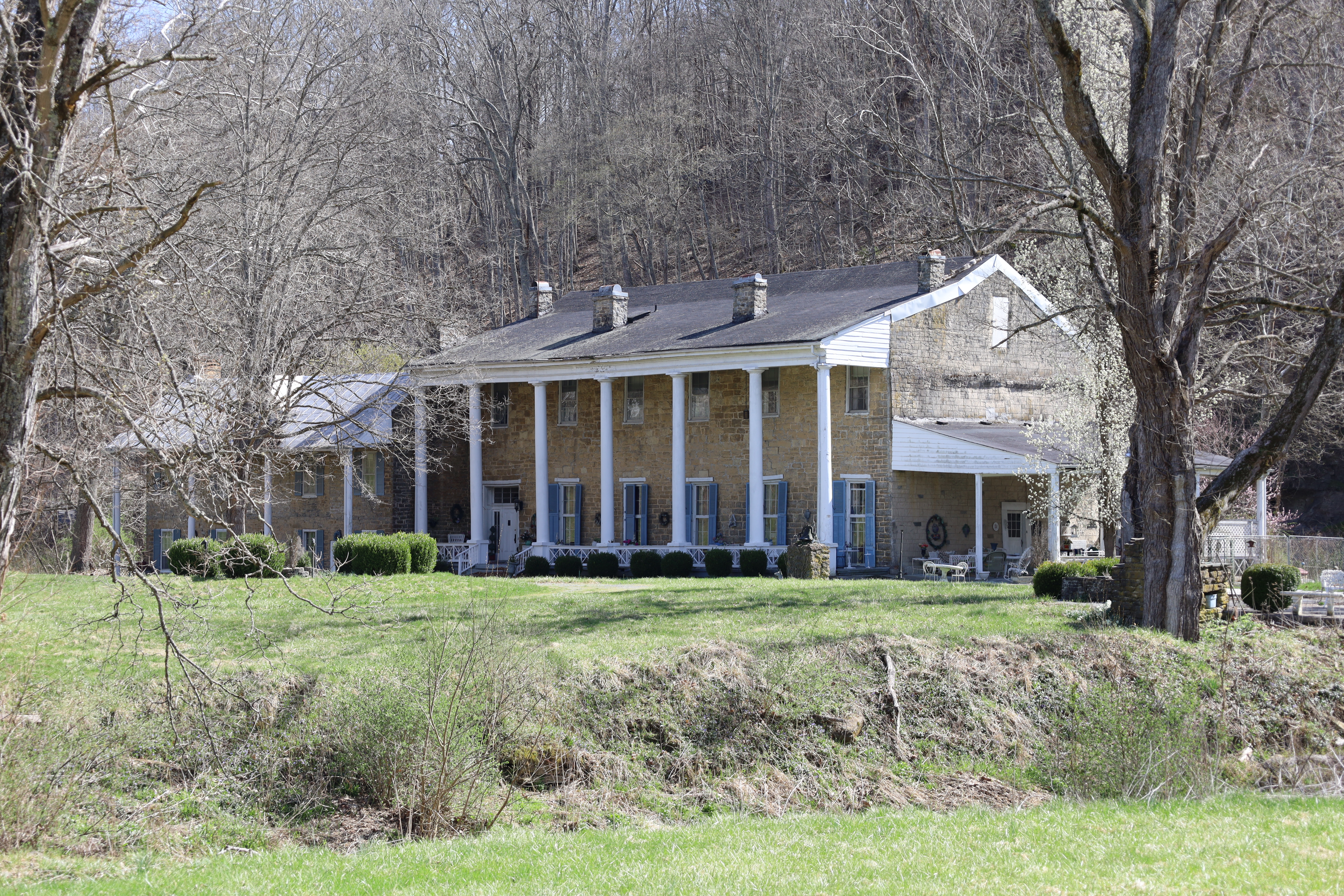
- The hotel building in 2022

- Location within West Virginia Location within the United States
- Location: U.S. Route 219, near Union, West Virginia
- Coordinates: 37°34′12″N 80°34′9″W
- Area: 34 acres (14 ha)
- Architect: Fullen, John, Sr.; Fullen, John, Jr.
- Architectural style: Greek Revival
- NRHP reference No.: 85003412
- Added to NRHP: October 31, 1985

Salt Sulphur Springs Historic District is a national historic district located at Salt Sulphur Springs, near Union, West Virginia, Monroe County, West Virginia. The district includes seven contributing buildings, three contributing sites, and two contributing structures related to the Old Salt Sulphur Springs Resort or "Old Salt." Notable properties include the Old Stone Hotel, Episcopal Chapel, Stone Store Building (1820), Stone Bath House (1820), Stone Spring House (c. 1820), Sweet Sulphur Springs Site (discovered 1802), Salt Sulphur Spring (discovered 1805), and Iodine Spring (1838). It is the area's most significant collection of native limestone buildings.

It was listed on the National Register of Historic Places in 1985.

== Gallery ==
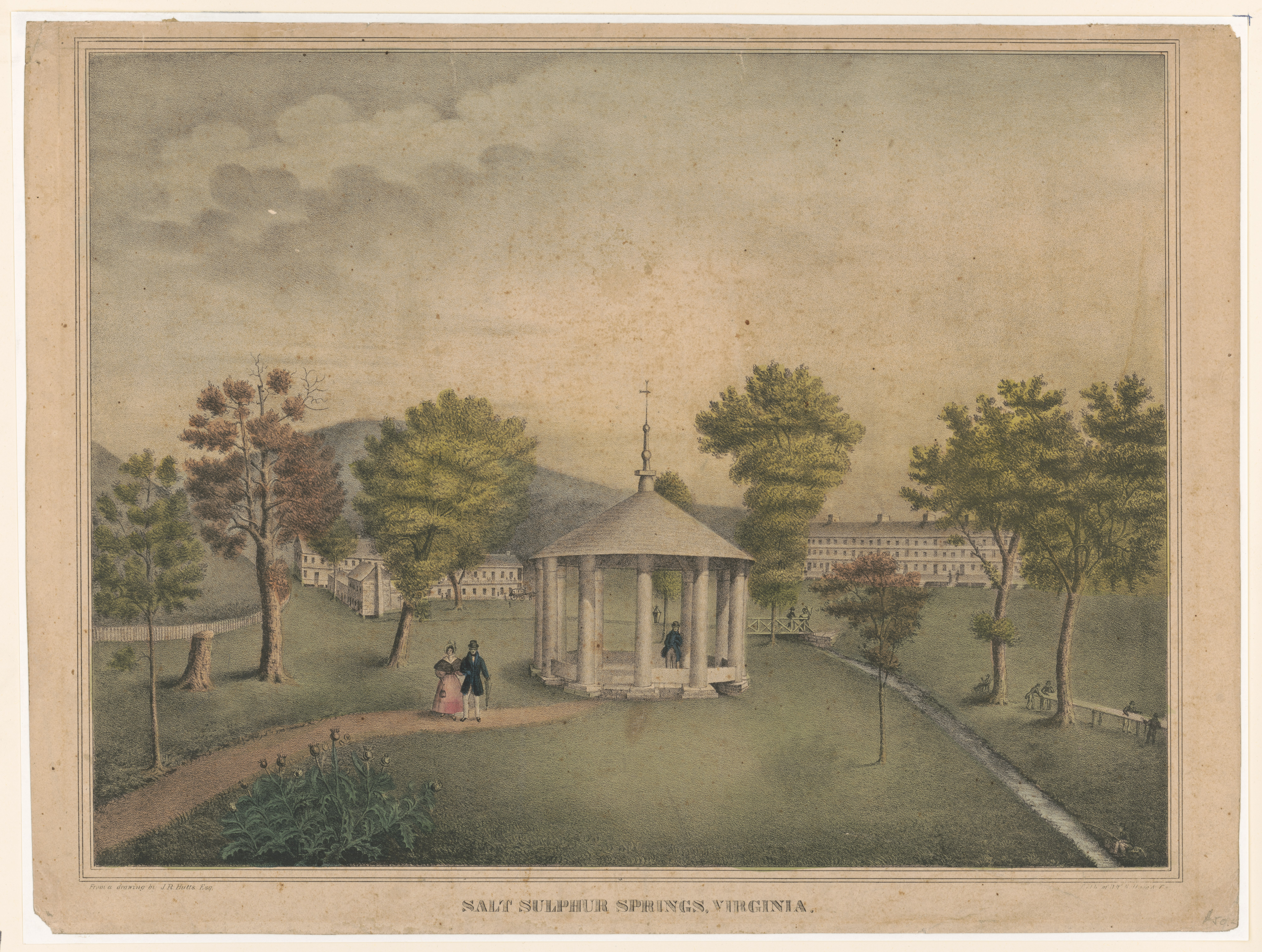
Image prior to Civil War

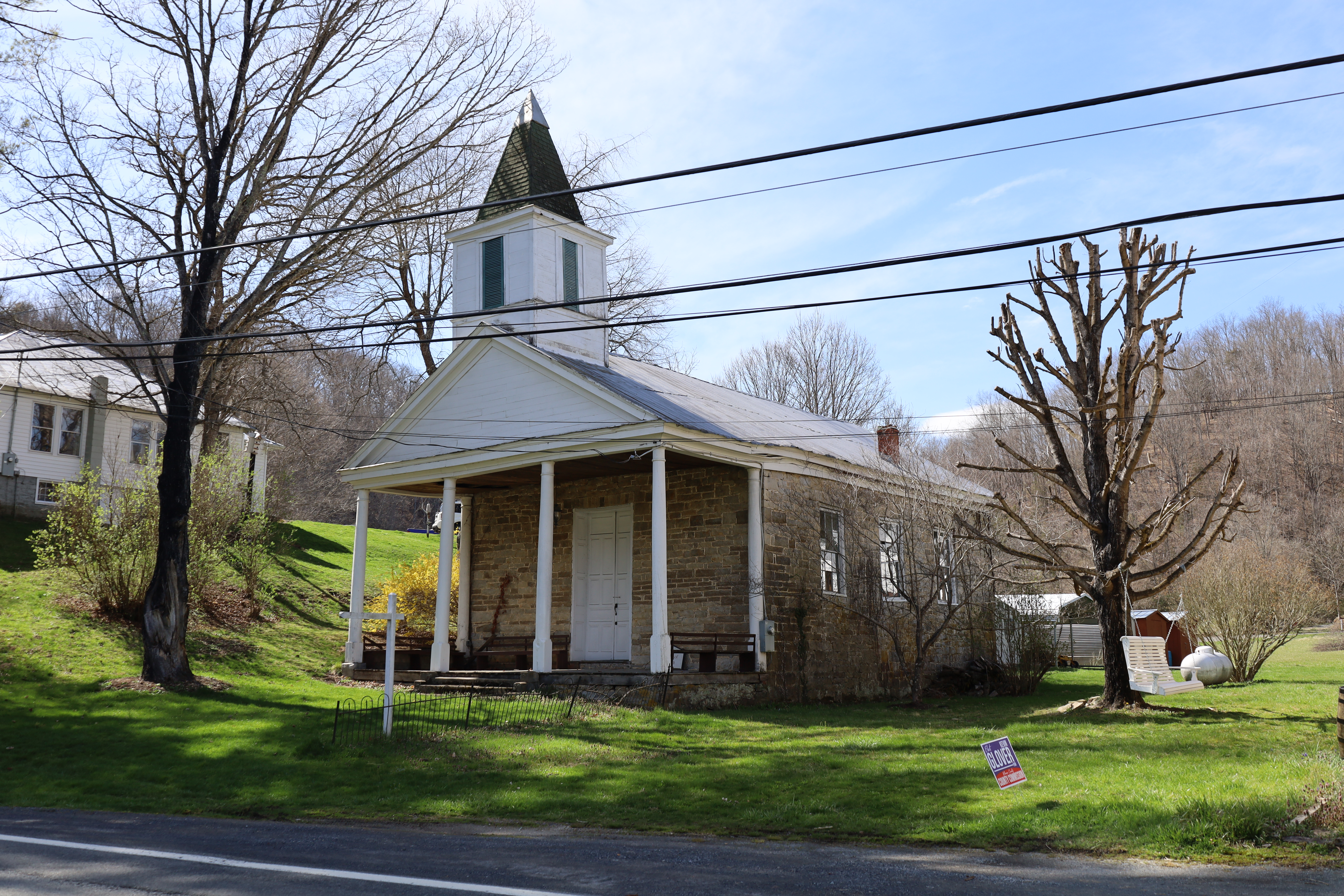
Chapel in 2022

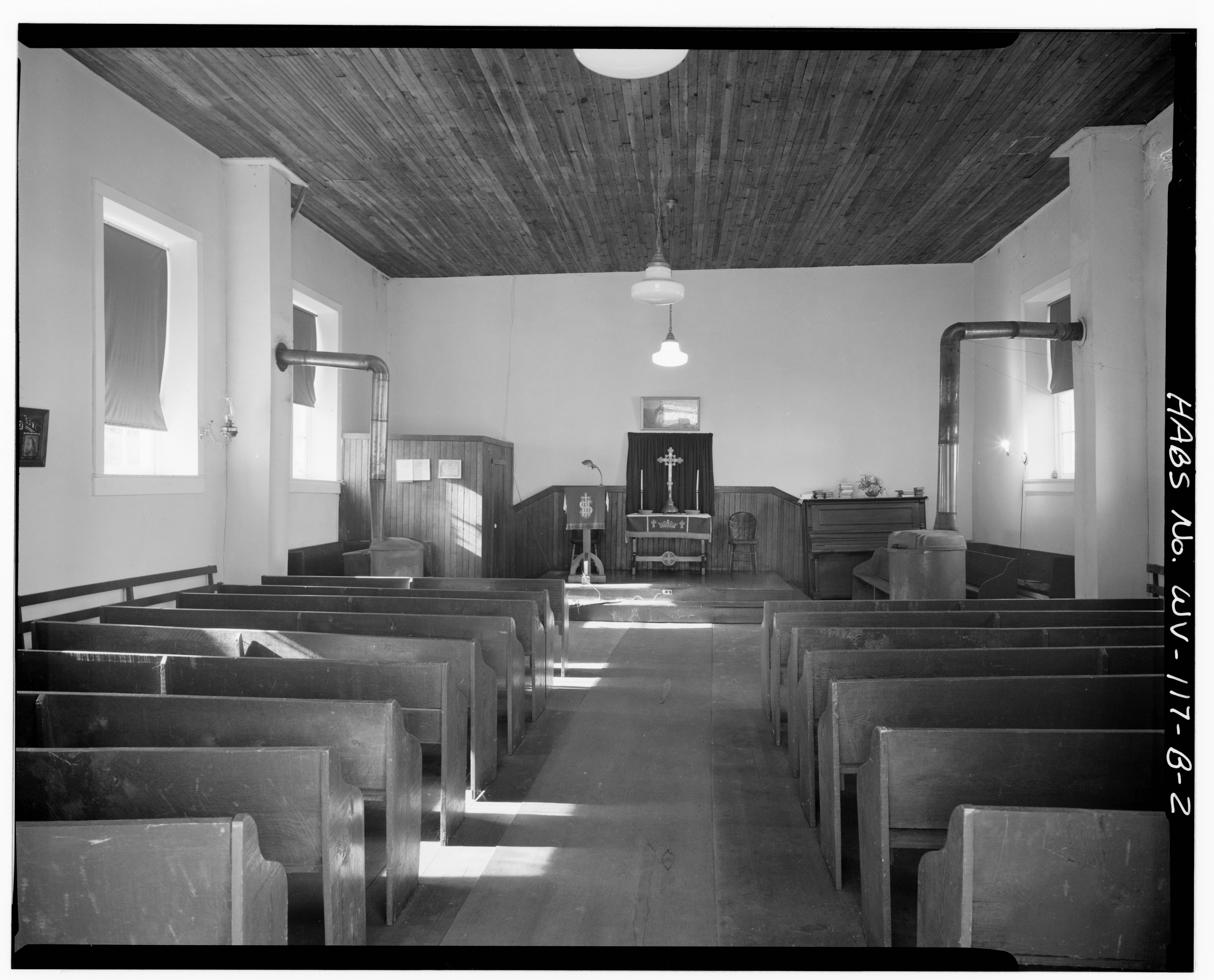
Interior of the chapel in 1974

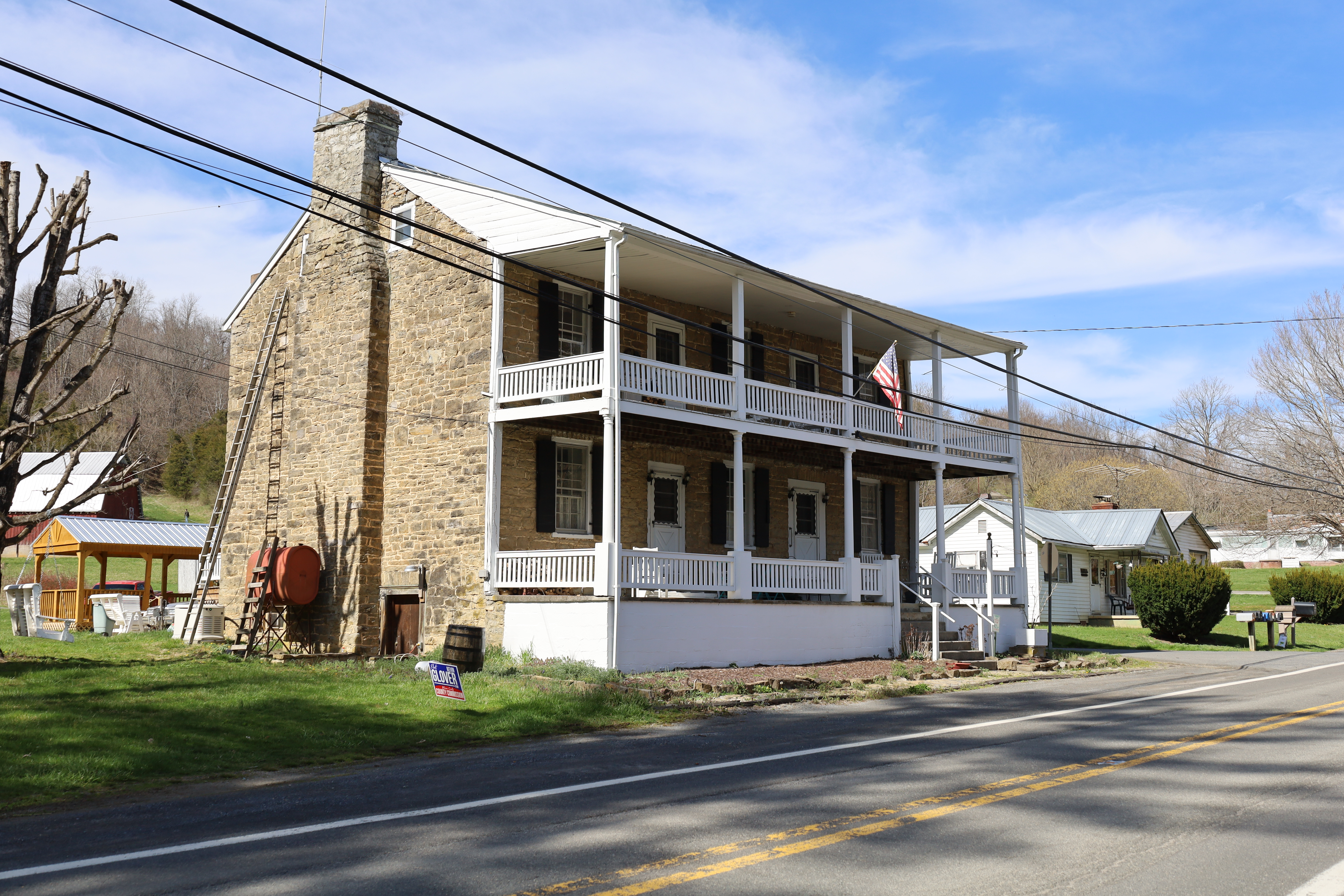
Store Building in 2022

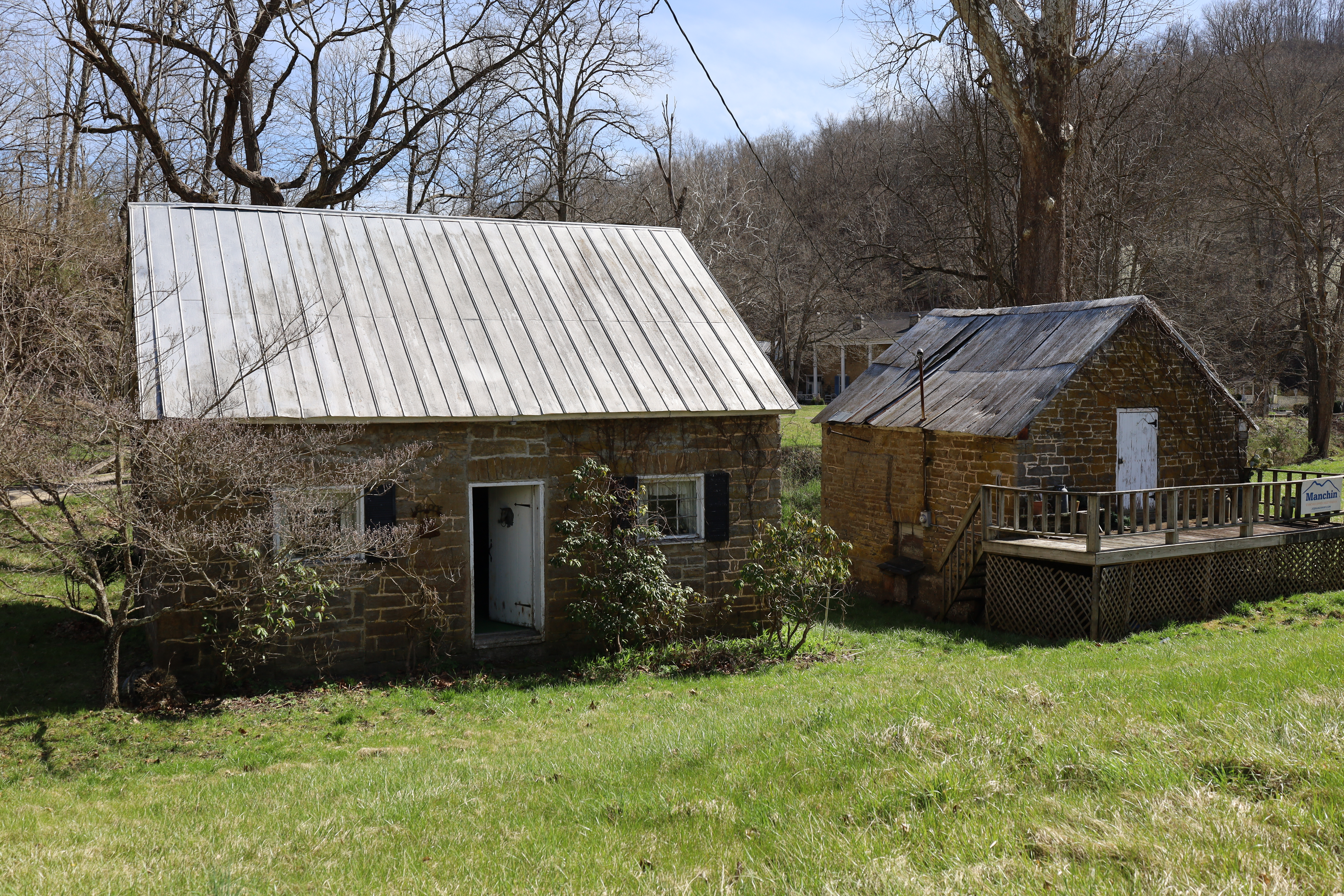
Bath House and Spring House in 2022

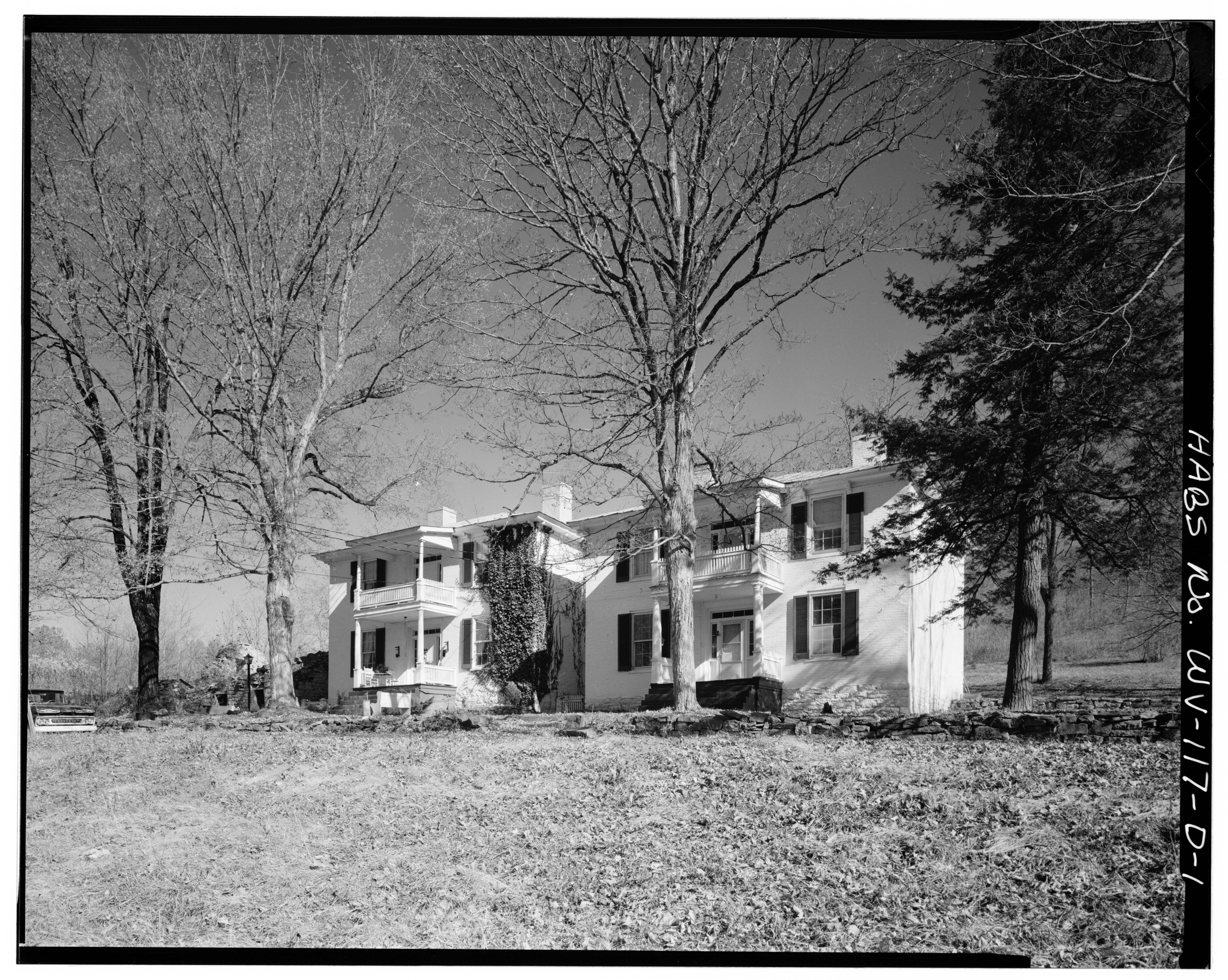
Cottages in 1974

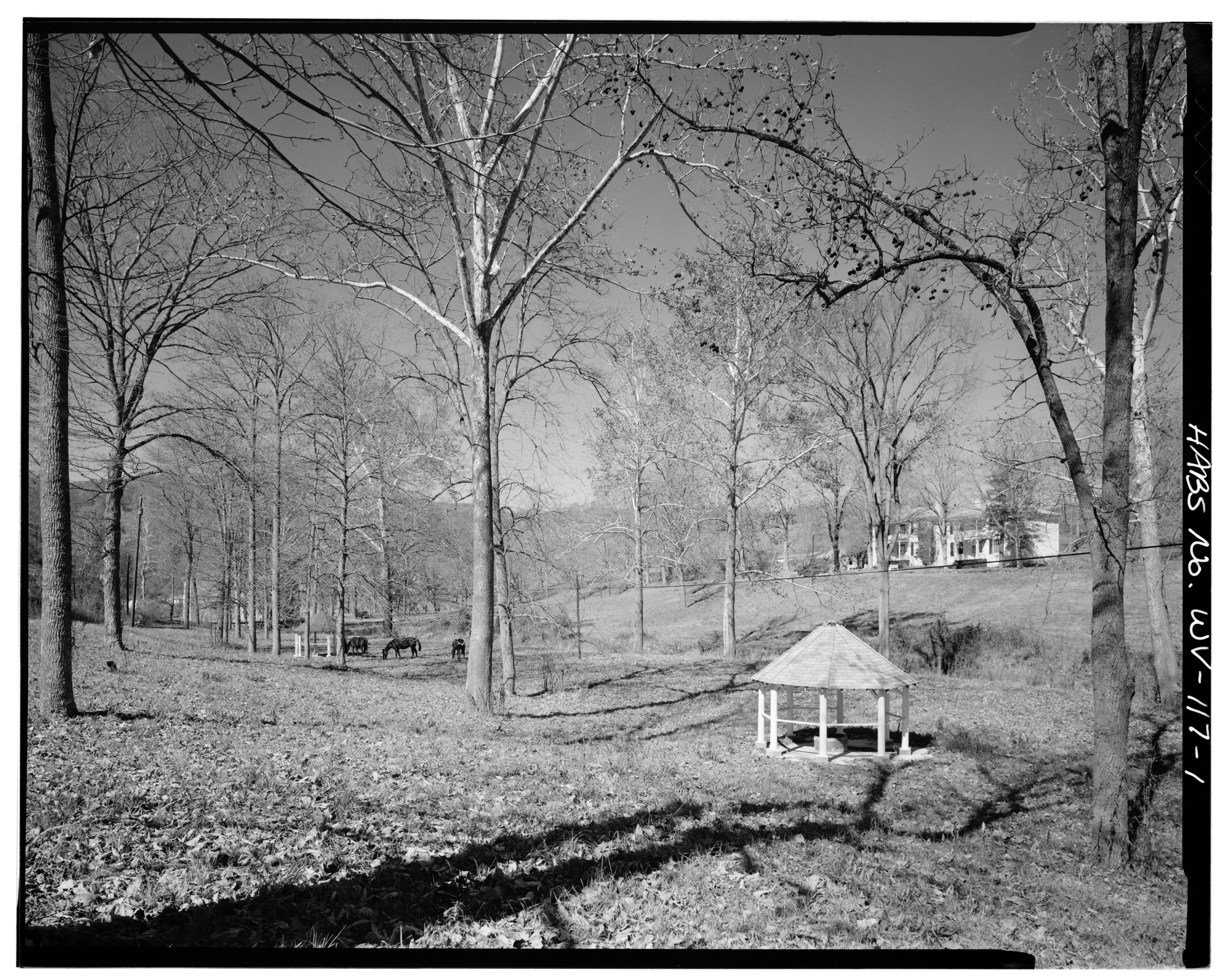
Iodine Spring in 1974

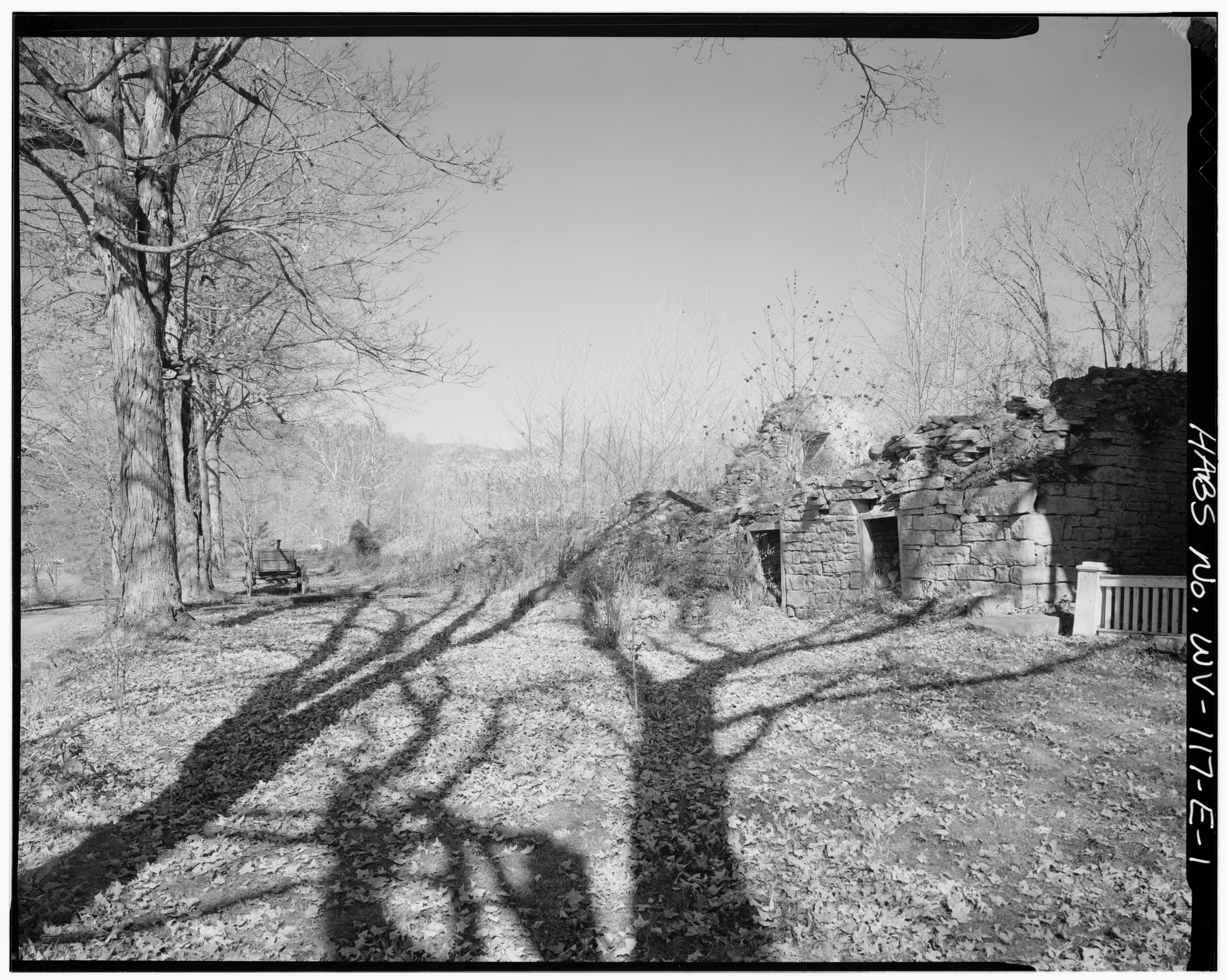
Erskine House in ruins in 1974
