= First Baptist Church of Bluefield =

Baptist church in West Virginia, US

- U.S. National Register of Historic Places
- Location: 100 Duhring St Bluefield, West Virginia 24701
- Coordinates: 37°16′04″N 81°13′34″W
- Built: 1910
- Architectural style: Eclectic architecture
- NRHP reference No.: 100009142
- Added to NRHP: 2023

The First Baptist Church of Bluefield is a baptist church in Bluefield, West Virginia. Constructed between 1907 and 1910, it is believed to have been designed by Harry S. Mabie, who also served as the church's pastor during that period. The building is an example of Elecectic architecture, featuring a combination of stylistic elements drawn from early twentieth-century movements, including Gothic Revival architecture and Romanesque Revival architecture.

Notable architectural features include large Tudor-arched stained glass windows and doors, octagonal walls, brick corbeling, and a prominent corner tower. The church's interior follows a variation of the Akron Plan, a popular ecclesiastical layout from the late 19th and early 20th centuries.

It was listed on the National Register of Historic Places in 2023.

== See also ==
- National Register of Historic Places listings in Mercer County, West Virginia
