= Country Club Hill Historic District =

Historic district in West Virginia, United States

- U.S. National Register of Historic Places
- U.S. Historic district
- Location within West Virginia Location within the United States
- Location: Along Whitethorn, Lebanon and Liberty Sts., Bluefield, West Virginia
- Coordinates: 37°14′N 81°14′W
- Area: 27.8 acres (11.3 ha)
- Built: 1920
- Architect: Multiple, including Alex B. Mahood
- Architectural style: Colonial Revival, Classical Revival, Bungalow/craftsman
- MPS: South Bluefield MPS
- NRHP reference No.: 92000878
- Added to NRHP: November 5, 1992

Country Club Hill Historic District is a national historic district located at Bluefield, Mercer County, West Virginia. The district includes 51 contributing buildings in a residential area of South Bluefield. The buildings are primarily large single family residences with generous front and rear yards. The properties were mostly developed prior to 1940, and are representative of popular architectural styles including Colonial Revival, Classical Revival, and Bungalow styles. The Bluefield Country Club (1920) and some of the houses were designed by architect Alex B. Mahood.

It was listed on the National Register of Historic Places in 1992.
