= Page Coal and Coke Company Store =

- U.S. National Register of Historic Places
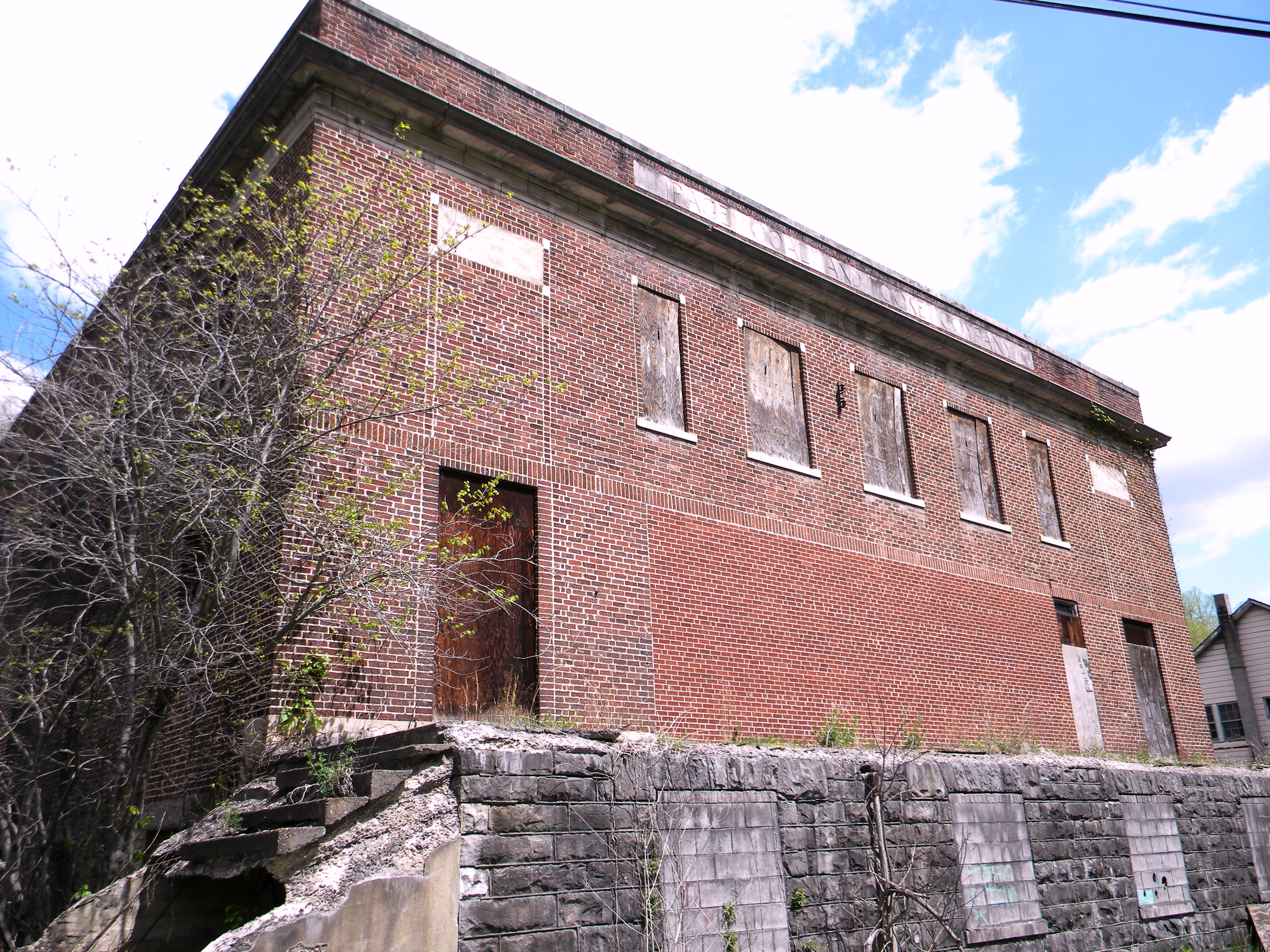

- Location within West Virginia Location within the United States
- Location: WV 161, Pageton, West Virginia
- Coordinates: 37°20′57″N 81°27′53″W
- Area: less than one acre
- Architect: Alex B. Mahood
- Architectural style: Classical Revival
- MPS: Coal Company Stores in McDowell County MPS
- NRHP reference No.: 92000325
- Added to NRHP: April 17, 1992

Page Coal and Coke Company Store is a historic company store building located at Pageton, McDowell County, West Virginia. It is a two-story brick building on a tall, skillfully-constructed stone foundation. It was designed in 1914 by architect Alex B. Mahood, and is in the Classical Revival style.

It was listed on the National Register of Historic Places in 1992.
