= Jefferson Street Historic District (Brownsville, Tennessee) =

Historic district in Tennessee, United States

- East Main Street Historic District
- U.S. National Register of Historic Places
- U.S. Historic district
- Location within Tennessee Location within the United States
- Location: Roughly bounded by Margin & E. Main Sts., S. Jackson & Washington Aves., Brownsville, Tennessee
- Coordinates: 35°35′34″N 89°15′42″W
- Area: 1.4 acres (0.57 ha)
- Architect: Multiple
- NRHP reference No.: 14001225
- Added to NRHP: March 28, 2016

The Jefferson Street Historic District in Brownsville, Tennessee is a 1.4 acres (0.57 ha) historic district which was listed on the National Register of Historic Places in 2016.

It is an area which emerged in the early 1900s as the center for the city’s African-American community. While African Americans could shop in the white-owned businesses on the court square, they were often discriminated against. With the rise of the city’s African-American middle class, several businesses evolved along Jefferson Street. The majority of these buildings are One-Part and Two-Part Commercial Block buildings with modest detailing.

The listing included 13 contributing buildings and one contributing site (a community park), as well as three non-contributing buildings and a non-contributing site (site of a demolished building).

The contributing resources are:

- C.P. Boyd Park (c.1948), South Jackson Ave. Was a "Negro tent" from 1887 to 1896, a frame residence from 1896 to 1944, and a park from 1948 to the present, with a wooden gazebo and park benches.
- 35 South Jackson Avenue (c.1935), a one-part commercial block
- 36(B) South Jackson Avenue (c.1947), a two-part commercial block
- 39(B) S. Jackson Avenue (c.1943), a two-part commercial block
- 14 East Jefferson Street (c.1900), a two-part commercial block with brick corbelling
- 18 East Jefferson Street (c.1919), a one-part commercial block, brick
- 22 East Jefferson Street (c.1910), a one-part commercial block with two storefronts
- 29 (A) East Jefferson Street (c.1964), a one-story commercial building
- 29 (B) East Jefferson Street (c.1948), a one-story concrete block building
- Winfield Lodge #52, 33 East Jefferson Street (c.1910), one-part commercial block, with stepped brick parapet and brick corbelling
- 34 (A) East Jefferson Street (c.1908), a one-part commercial block
- 34 (B) East Jefferson Street (c.1957), a one-story concrete block commercial building
- 34 (C) East Jefferson Street (c.1948), a one-story brick veneer concrete block commercial building
- 34 East Main Street (c.1906), one-part commercial block
