= Peerless Coal Company Store =

- U.S. National Register of Historic Places
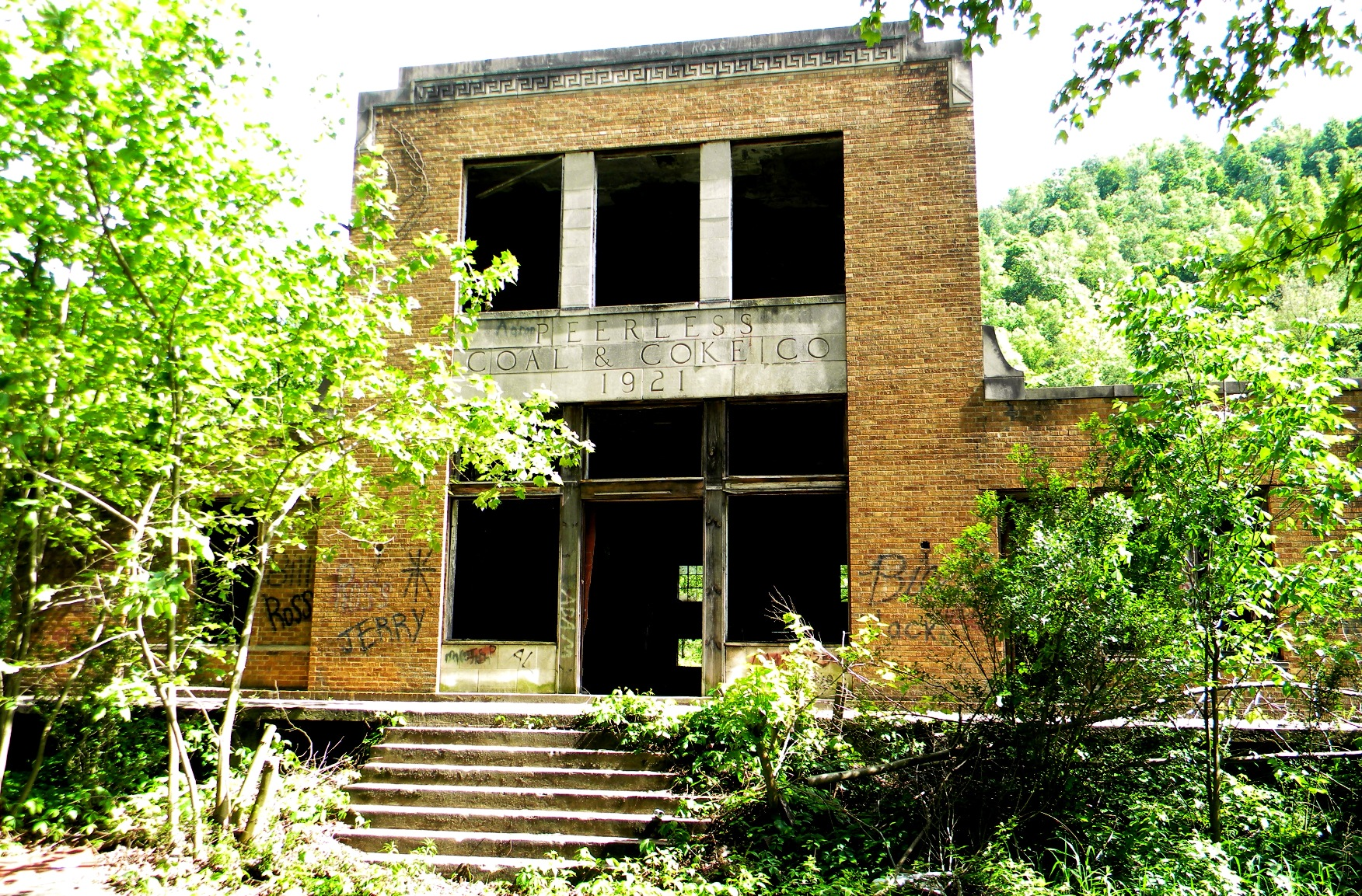

- Location within West Virginia Location within the United States
- Location: S of US 52, Vivian, West Virginia
- Coordinates: 37°25′3″N 81°29′26″W
- Area: less than one acre
- Architect: Alex B. Mahood
- Architectural style: Modern Movement
- MPS: Coal Company Stores in McDowell County MPS
- NRHP reference No.: 92000322
- Added to NRHP: April 17, 1992

Peerless Coal Company Store is a historic company store building located at Vivian, McDowell County, West Virginia. It was designed by architect Alex B. Mahood and built in 1921, and the main block of the brick store building is two-stories with one-story flanking wings. It has a concrete parapet that defines the facade's roofline on both the two and one-story sections. It features a modern design, irregular plan, stone foundation, and simple decoration.

It was listed on the National Register of Historic Places in 1992.
