= Upper Oakhurst Historic District =

Historic district in West Virginia, United States

- U.S. National Register of Historic Places
- U.S. Historic district
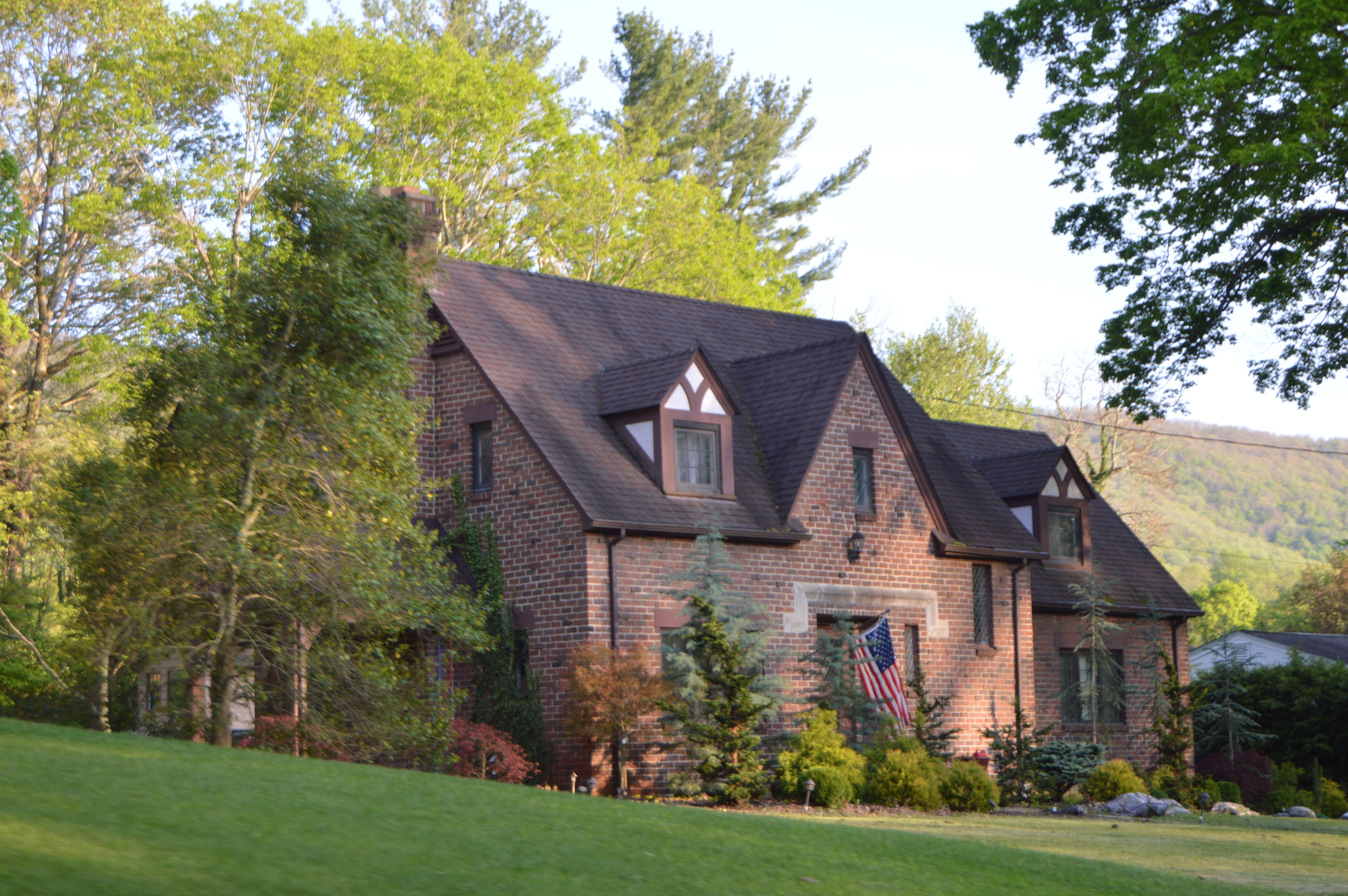
- House on Edgewood Road

- Location within West Virginia Location within the United States
- Location: Along Oakhurst Ave., Groveland Dr., Edgewood Rd. and Mountain View Rd., Bluefield, West Virginia
- Coordinates: 37°15′45″N 81°12′22″W
- Area: 21.3 acres (8.6 ha)
- Architect: Alex B. Mahood Et al.
- Architectural style: Late 19th And 20th Century Revivals, Bungalow/craftsman
- MPS: South Bluefield MPS
- NRHP reference No.: 92000875
- Added to NRHP: July 29, 1992

Upper Oakhurst Historic District is a national historic district located at Bluefield, Mercer County, West Virginia. The district includes 37 contributing buildings in a residential area adjacent to South Bluefield. The buildings are primarily large single-family residences on large lots. The properties were mostly developed during the 1920s, and are representative of popular architectural styles, including Colonial Revival and Classical Revival. A number of the homes were designed by architect Alex B. Mahood.

It was listed on the National Register of Historic Places in 1992.
