= Itmann Company Store and Office =

- U.S. National Register of Historic Places
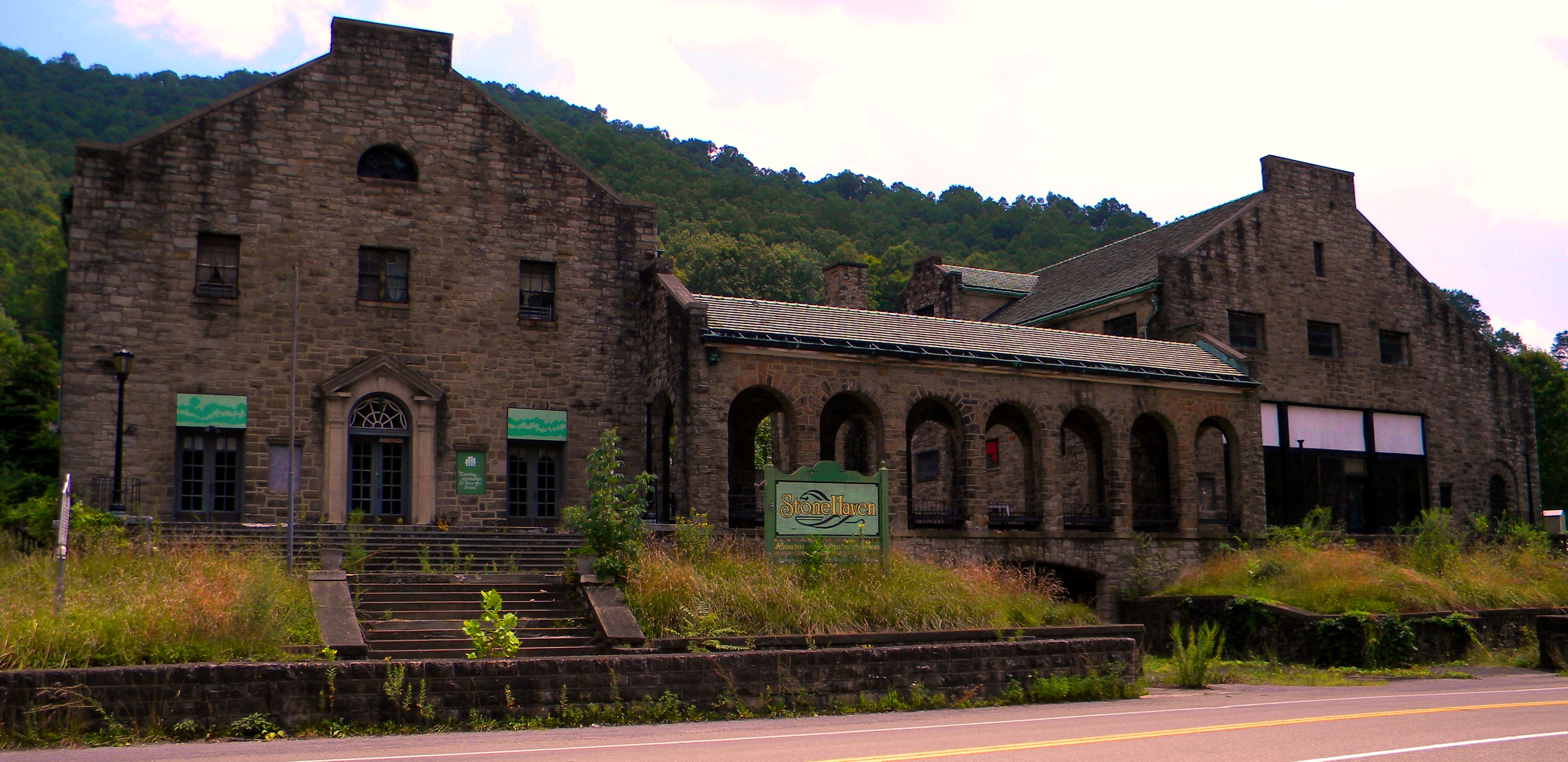
- Itmann Company Store and Office, July 2010

- Location within West Virginia Location within the United States
- Location: WV 10/16, Itmann, West Virginia
- Coordinates: 37°34′26″N 81°25′4″W
- Area: 1.8 acres (0.73 ha)
- Built: 1923
- Architect: Mahood, Alex B.
- Architectural style: Classical Revival
- NRHP reference No.: 90001775
- Added to NRHP: November 28, 1990

Itmann Company Store and Office is a historic commercial building located at Itmann, Wyoming County, West Virginia. It was designed by architect Alex B. Mahood and built in 1923–1925. It is a Classical Revival style complex built of native sandstone. It consists of four sections (A through D) laid out in an open courtyard plan. Sections A and C are 2 1/2-story parapeted gable front sections located on the northern and southern sides of the courtyard and Section D is a 1-story parapeted half gable roofed loggia. It was built as a company store for the local mining community.

It was listed on the National Register of Historic Places in 1990.
