= Mercer County Courthouse (West Virginia) =

- U.S. National Register of Historic Places
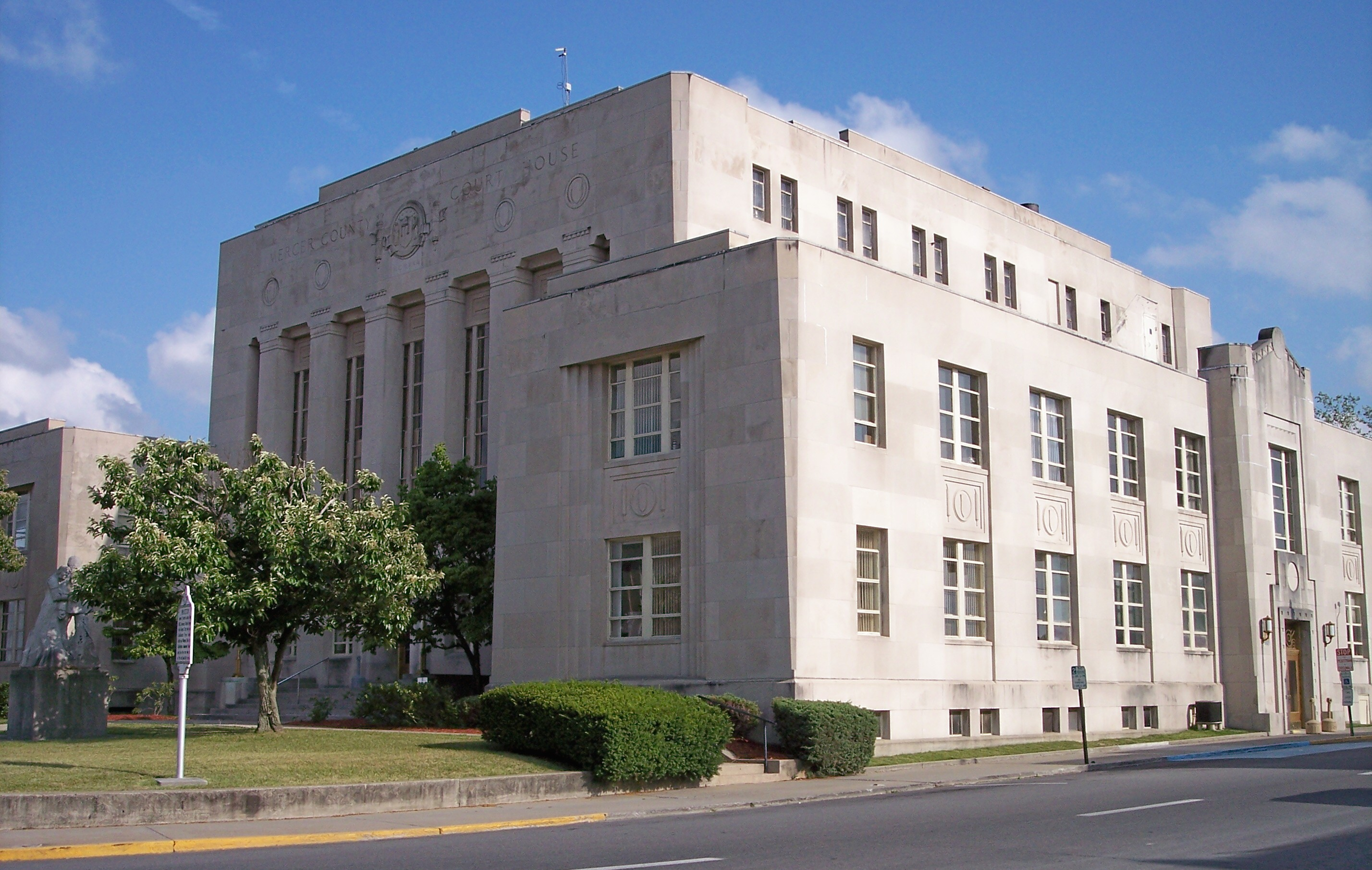
- Mercer County Courthouse, July 2007

- Location within West Virginia Location within the United States
- Interactive map showing the location of Mercer County Courthouse
- Location: Courthouse Sq., Princeton, West Virginia
- Coordinates: 37°21′56″N 81°6′12″W
- Built: 1930
- Architect: Mahood, Alex B.; Boone, Eason & Wood
- Architectural style: Moderne, Art Deco
- NRHP reference No.: 80004032
- Added to NRHP: November 28, 1980

The Mercer County Courthouse in Princeton, West Virginia was built in 1930–31 in the Art Moderne style. Designed by Alex B. Mahood, it is the most significant example of the style in southern West Virginia. Friezes above the front and rear doors were designed by Mrs. S.L. Mahood, the mother of the architect.

It was listed on the National Register of Historic Places in 1980.

The Mercer County Courthouse sits in a traffic circle bordered by Main Street on the north side, Scott Street on the west side, Princeton Avenue on the south side, and Alvis Street on the east side.

Although designed and built with entrances on all four sides, due to the security issues of today, the public can only enter through the north door.
