= Easley House =

Historic house in West Virginia, United States

- U.S. National Register of Historic Places
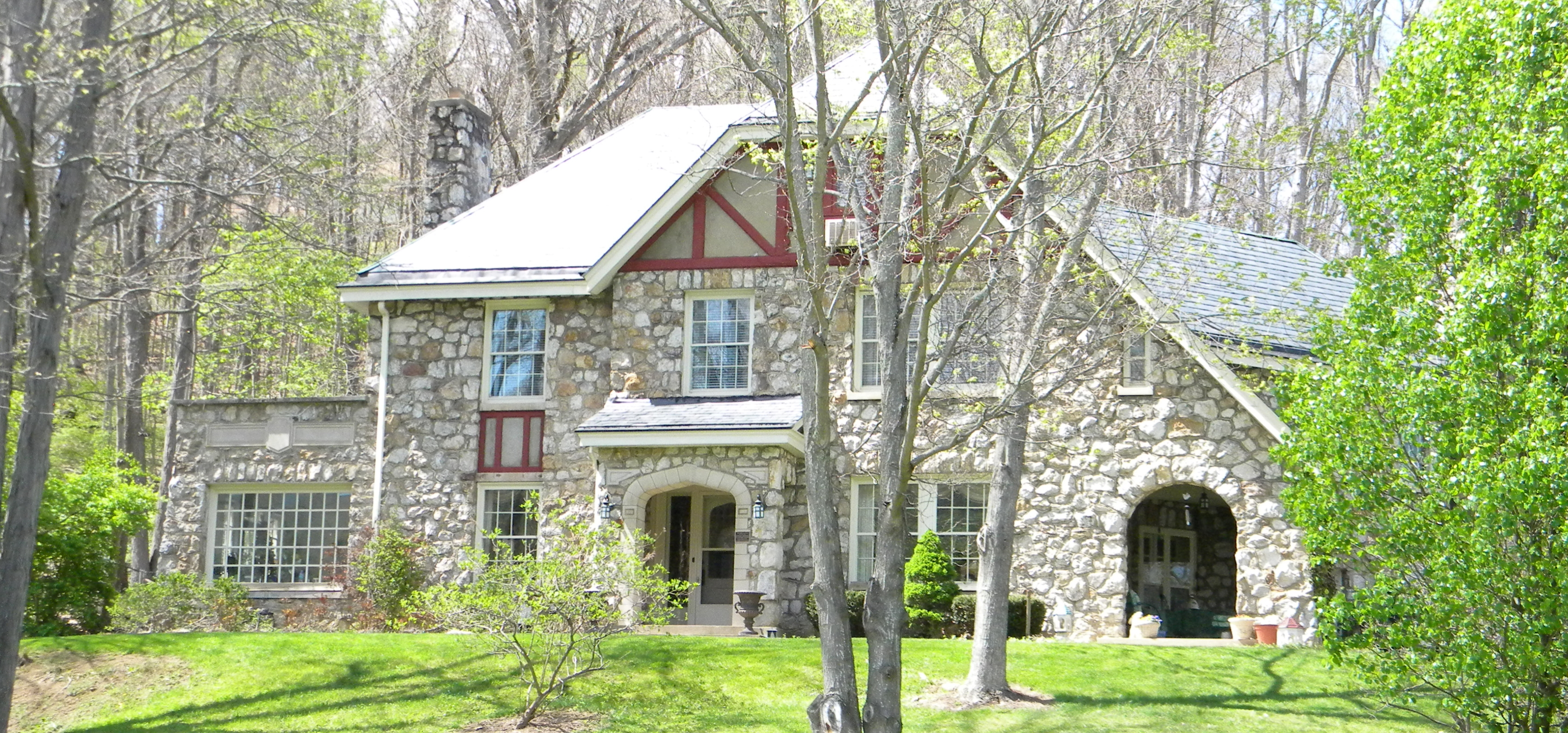

- Location within West Virginia Location within the United States
- Location: 1500 College Ave., Bluefield, West Virginia
- Coordinates: 37°15′1″N 81°14′12″W
- Area: 1.4 acres (0.57 ha)
- Built: 1919
- Built by: John Lamaka and Lawrence Carole
- Architect: Alex B. Mahood
- Architectural style: Tudor Revival
- MPS: South Bluefield MPS
- NRHP reference No.: 92000879
- Added to NRHP: July 29, 1992

Easley House, also known as "The Breezes," is a historic home located at Bluefield, Mercer County, West Virginia. It was designed by architect Alex B. Mahood, and built between 1919 and 1922. It is a stone, 2 1/2-story, Tudor Revival-style dwelling with a one-story conservatory wing. It has irregular massing and a projecting gable. Also on the property is a two-story side gable stone garage.

It was listed on the National Register of Historic Places in 1992.
