= Blackman–Bosworth Store =

- U.S. National Register of Historic Places
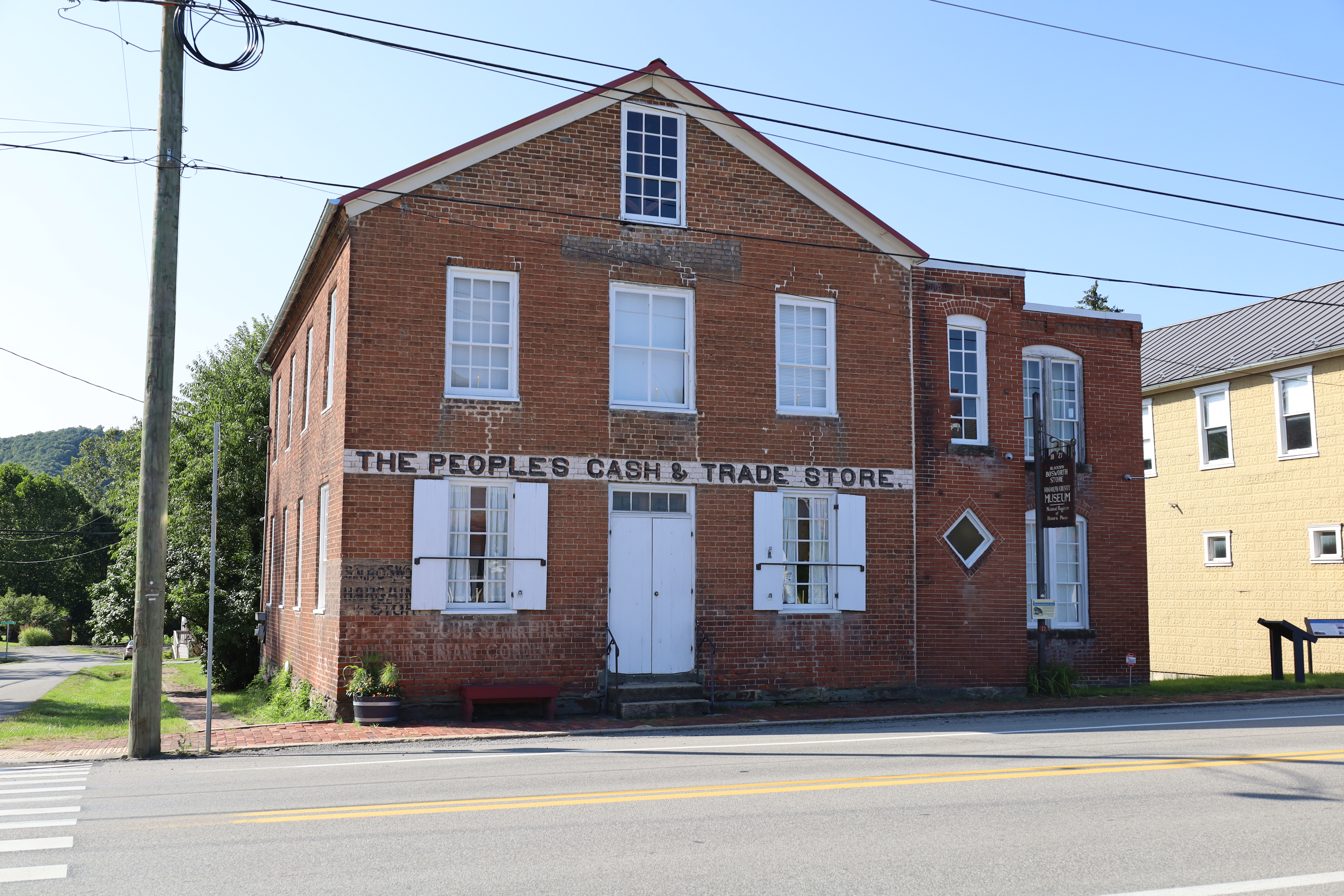
- Blackman–Bosworth Store in 2021

- Location within West Virginia Location within the United States
- Location: Main and Court Sts., Beverly, West Virginia
- Coordinates: 38°50′27″N 79°52′32″W
- Area: 0.8 acres (0.32 ha)
- Built: c. 1828, 1894
- NRHP reference No.: 75001897
- Added to NRHP: April 14, 1975

Blackman–Bosworth Store, also known as Bosworth Store Building, S.N. Bosworth's Cheap Cash Store, David Blackman's Store, and Randolph County Museum, is a historic general store located at Beverly, Randolph County, West Virginia, United States. It consists of the original section, built about 1828, with an addition built in 1894. The original section is a two-story brick building on a cut-stone foundation. In addition to being operated as a general store into the 1920s, the building had short-term use as county courthouse, post office and semi-official meeting place. In 1973, the Randolph County Historical Society purchased the property, and it now serves as the Randolph County Museum and as a meeting place.

It was listed on the National Register of Historic Places in 1975.
