= Bluefield Green Book Historic District =

- U.S. National Register of Historic Places
- U.S. Historic district
- Location within West Virginia Location within the United States
- Location: 1039-1047 Wayne St., Bluefield, West Virginia
- Coordinates: 37°16′25″N 81°12′59″W
- Area: 0.476 acres (0.193 ha)
- Built: 1920-1949
- NRHP reference No.: 100010606
- Added to NRHP: July 24, 2024

The Bluefield Green Book Historic District comprises two buildings in Bluefield, West Virginia, that were used as hotels and apartments catering to African-American travelers during the segregation era of the mid-20th century. The Traveler's Inn Hotel was built in 1920, and the Hotel Thelma was built in 1948–49 on an adjoining lot on Wayne Street. Both were listed in the Negro Motorist Green Book. The Hotel Thelma was listed from 1950 to 1961, and the Traveler's Inn Hotel was listed from 1959 to 1966.

== History ==
The principal African-American neighborhoods in Bluefield were located on the north side of town, across the Norfolk & Western Railway tracks paralleling Wayne Street, and on the east side of the city. Bland Street and Scott Street emerged as Black business districts to the south of the tracks. Segregation was enforced in Bluefield, with Black customers barred from downtown businesses. After a series of civil disobedience actions, segregation was abolished in 1960. Black-owned businesses declined thereafter.

The Negro Motorist Green Book was published from 1936 to 1967 to aid African-American travelers in finding safe, welcoming accommodations. From 1940, five businesses were listed in Bluefield, including the Traveler's Inn from 1940 to 1957, and the Hotel Thelma from 1950 to 1961.

=== Traveler's Inn Hotel ===
The Traveler's Inn Hotel was first established on Raleigh Street in 1920. In 1950 the hotel moved to 1039 Wayne Street, which had been a commercial building and apartment building. The building had been an apartment building catering to white residents, and then was a nursery, sponsored by the Works Progress Administration (WPA) during the 1930s. Alma Florence was the building's owner. The relocated hotel had a restaurant on the first floor, and rooms on the second floor.

In 1969 Florence sold the building to Carolyn Foster Bailey, who lived in the Thelma Hotel. Bailey owned the Traveler's Inn Hotel until 1988, selling it to Paul D. Brown and James M. Wade. During that time it was used as an apartment building, and also saw service as a polling place.

=== Hotel Thelma ===
Thelma Stone (c.1905-1981) was an African-American businesswomen, who had operated Jane's Greenleaf Sandwich Shop on Bland Street, and then the Florence Hotel on Wilson Street, including Jane's Dining Room. Thelma and her sister Helen Witten lived at the property. In 1947 Thelma bought property on Waynes Street next to the Traveler's Inn Hotel, with an existing early 1900s house on the site. In 1948 she added the front portion of the hotel as an addition to the house, and in 1949 she added another wing on the east side. The building was opened as the Hotel Thelma on Thanksgiving Day, November 24, 1949. By 1953 she had obtained a license to sell beer, and in 1954 she added Thelma's Grocery at the site. The hotel was listed in the Green Book until 1960. In 1963, Thelma's Restaurant was operating at the site. Thelma Stone lived in a three-bedroom apartment at the property until her death in 1981. The hotel continued in operation until the mid-1980s under the ownership of Thelma Stone's niece and her husband. In 1991 they sold the property to James and Carol Wade, who owned shares in the Traveler's Inn Hotel next door. In 1996 the property was sold to the Infirmity Prayer Service. The property is governed by a charity that seeks to restore the building as a community resource. Plans include a restaurant and shop, with restoration of the guest rooms to reflect the hotel's time of operation.

The hotel was frequented by traveling entertainers on the Chitlin' Circuit. Guests know to have stayed at the Thelma included Little Richard, Ike and Tina Turner, Sam Cooke, Etta James, and James Brown.

== Description ==
=== Traveler's Inn Hotel ===
The Traveler's Inn Hotel is a two-story brick commercial-style building. The street frontage has a storefront with the second floor entrance on the left side, and two sets of paired windows on the second floor. The side elevations have windows at the second floor. The roof has a shallow pitch to the rear, with stepped parapets on either side. There are faded signs for Nehi drinks in front and Royal Crown Cola on the east side.

=== Hotel Thelma ===
The Hotel Thelma began with the original two-story residential structure, set well back from the street. It has a shallow hipped roof and large steel casement windows. The first addition faces the street to the south. This two-story section has a flat roof with a central recessed entrance and large windows composed of glass block framing picture windows. Above are four steel casement windows. Exterior materials are painted concrete block, with brick access bands at the second floor and across the second floor window heads. The eastern addition is similar, but lower in height. Most windows are steel casements, but there is a large panel of glass block on the east side of the front addition.

The Traveler's Inn Hotel and the Hotel Thelma were part of the Green Book Multiple Property Survey, and were placed on the National Register of Historic Places on July 24, 2024.
