= South Bluefield Historic District =

Historic district in West Virginia, United States

- U.S. National Register of Historic Places
- U.S. Historic district
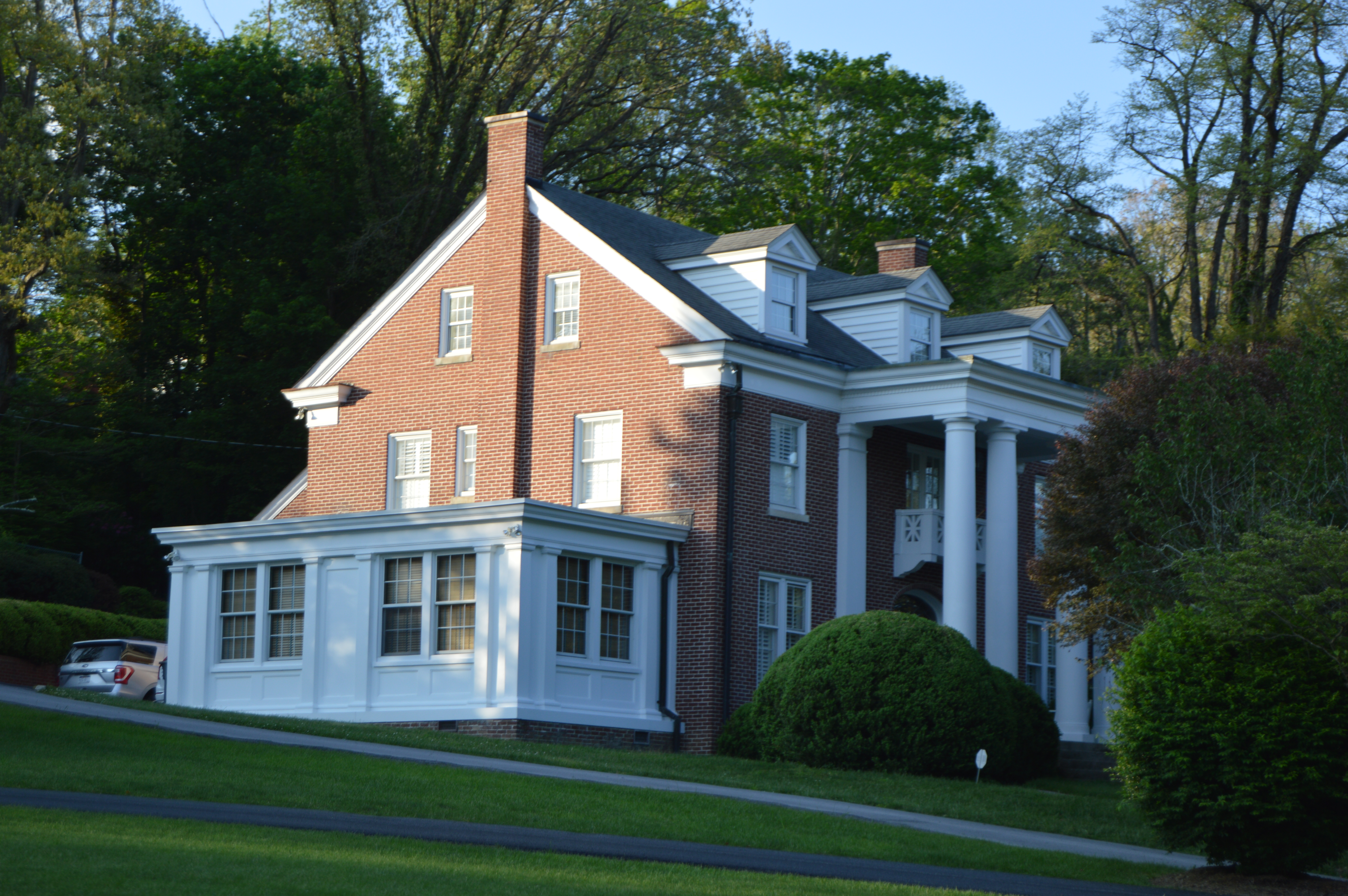
- House on Oakhurst Avenue

- Location within West Virginia Location within the United States
- Location: Along Mountain View Rd., Bland Rd., Oakhurst and Parkway, Bluefield, West Virginia
- Coordinates: 37°15′29″N 81°12′55″W
- Area: 33.4 acres (13.5 ha)
- Built: 1915
- Architect: Alex B. Mahood
- Architectural style: Late 19th And Early 20th Century American Movements, Late 19th And 20th Century Revivals, Four Square
- MPS: South Bluefield MPS
- NRHP reference No.: 92000876
- Added to NRHP: July 29, 1992

South Bluefield Historic District is a national historic district located at Bluefield, Mercer County, West Virginia. The district includes 84 contributing buildings in a residential area of Bluefield known as South Bluefield. The buildings are primarily large single family residences with broad lawns, landscaped entrances and yards. The properties were mostly developed between 1930 and 1940, and are representative of popular architectural styles including Colonial Revival and Classical Revival. A number of the homes were designed by architect Alex B. Mahood.

It was listed on the National Register of Historic Places in 1992.
