= Jefferson Street Historic District (Bluefield, West Virginia) =

Historic district in West Virginia, United States

- U.S. National Register of Historic Places
- U.S. Historic district
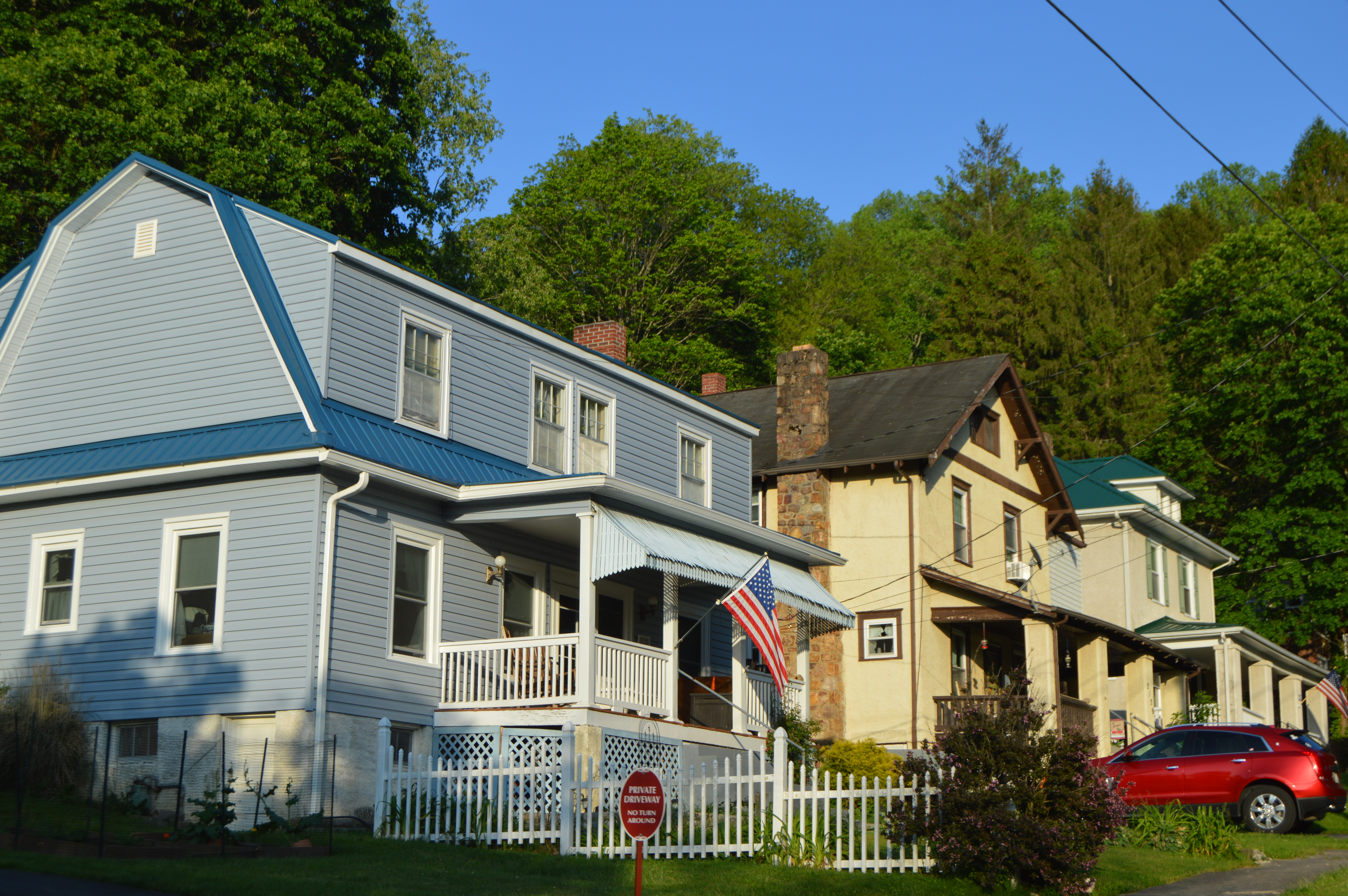
- Houses in the 2100 block

- Location within West Virginia Location within the United States
- Location: Along Jefferson St. between Cumberland Rd. and College Ave., Bluefield, West Virginia
- Coordinates: 37°15′5″N 81°13′2″W
- Area: 24.9 acres (10.1 ha)
- Built: 1910
- Architect: Alex B. Mahood, et al.
- Architectural style: Late 19th And Early 20th Century American Movements, Late 19th And 20th Century Revivals, Late Victorian
- MPS: South Bluefield MPS
- NRHP reference No.: 92000877
- Added to NRHP: July 29, 1992

Jefferson Street Historic District is a national historic district located at Bluefield, Mercer County, West Virginia. The district includes 63 contributing buildings in a residential area of Bluefield known as Oakland Addition, originally platted in 1910. The buildings are primarily single-family residences with a few multiple family dwellings, and one church, the College Avenue Baptist Church. Houses are representative of popular architectural styles from the turn of the 20th century, including American Four Square, Bungalow, Colonial Revival, and Classical Revival. A number of the homes were designed by architect Alex B. Mahood.

It was listed on the National Register of Historic Places in 1992.
