= Vivian, West Virginia =

Vivian
- Census-designated place
- Location within West Virginia
- Coordinates: 37°25′05″N 81°29′14″W
- Country: United States
- State: West Virginia
- County: McDowell

Area
  - Total: 0.363 sq mi (0.94 km^{2})
  - Land: 0.363 sq mi (0.94 km^{2})
  - Water: 0 sq mi (0 km^{2})
- Elevation: 1,621 ft (494 m)

Population (2020)
  - Total: 85
  - Density: 230/sq mi (90/km^{2})
- Time zone: UTC-5 (Eastern (EST))
  - Summer (DST): UTC-4 (EDT)
- Area codes: 304 & 681
- GNIS feature ID: 1555898

Vivian is a census-designated place (CDP) in McDowell County, West Virginia, United States. Vivian is located along U.S. Route 52, 1 mile (1.6 km) southeast of Kimball. As of the 2020 census, its population was 85 (a slight increase from 82 at the 2010 census).

An old variant name was Clausen. The Peerless Coal Company Store was listed on the National Register of Historic Places in 1992.
