= Salt Sulphur Springs, West Virginia =

- Unincorporated community
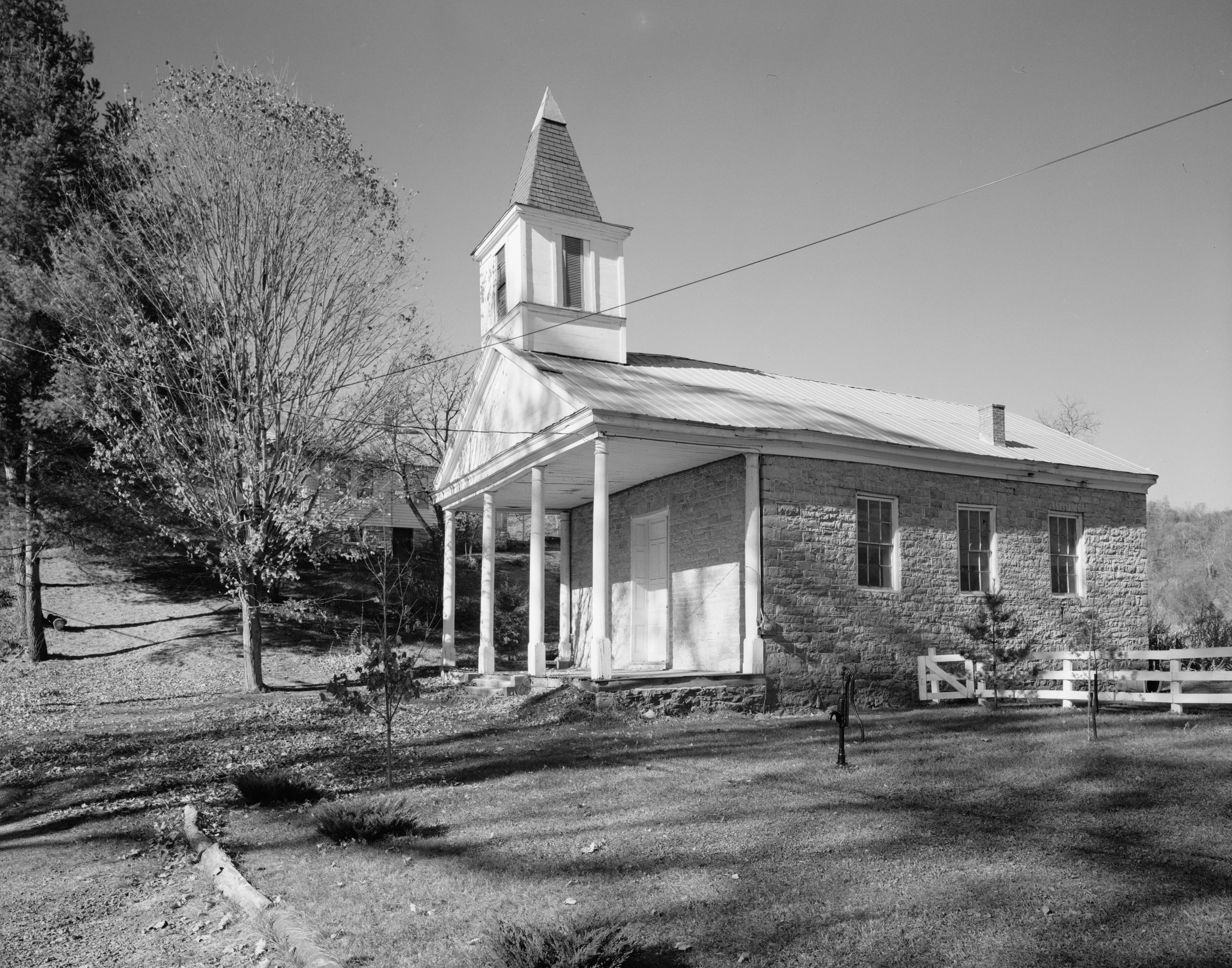
- Episcopal chapel in Salt Sulphur Springs

- Location within West Virginia Location within the United States
- Coordinates: 37°34′14″N 80°34′18″W
- Country: United States
- State: West Virginia
- County: Monroe
- Elevation: 1,801 ft (549 m)
- Time zone: UTC-5 (Eastern (EST))
  - Summer (DST): UTC-4 (EDT)
- Area codes: 304 & 681
- GNIS feature ID: 1546308

Salt Sulphur Springs is an unincorporated community in Monroe County, West Virginia, United States. Salt Sulphur Springs is located on U.S. Route 219, southwest of Union.

The community originally was a resort spa with two mineral springs. In 1985, seven buildings and two other structures qualified as contributing properties were listed on the National Register of Historic Places as a historic district, the "Salt Sulphur Springs Historic District."
