= Pageton, West Virginia =

Pageton
- Census-designated place (CDP)
- Location within the state of West Virginia
- Coordinates: 37°20′57″N 81°27′55″W
- Country: United States
- State: West Virginia
- County: McDowell

Area
  - Total: 1.225 sq mi (3.17 km^{2})
  - Land: 1.201 sq mi (3.11 km^{2})
  - Water: 0.024 sq mi (0.062 km^{2})

Population (2020)
  - Total: 174
  - Density: 145/sq mi (55.9/km^{2})
- Time zone: UTC-5 (Eastern (EST))
  - Summer (DST): UTC-4 (EDT)
- ZIP codes: 24871

Pageton is a census-designated place (CDP) in McDowell County, West Virginia, United States. As of the 2020 census, its population was 174 (down from 187 at the 2010 census). Pageton is located on the Tug Fork Branch of the Norfolk and Western Railway, along the Pocahontas seam of rich bituminous coal. Pageton is located on State Route 161 between Thorpe and Anawalt.

== History ==
Pageton was named after Louis R. Page, a colliery official.

== Legacy ==
Although coal mining activity ended long ago, the Page Coal and Coke Company Store at Pageton survives, and is listed on the National Register of Historic Places.
