= Coal camps in McDowell County, West Virginia =

Coal mining communities in West Virginia

The coal mining communities, or coal towns of McDowell County, West Virginia were situated to exploit the area's rich coal seams. Many of these towns were located in deep ravines that afforded direct access to the coal through the hillsides, allowing mined coal to be dropped or conveyed downhill to railway lines at the valley floor. Many of these encampments were set up as company towns, and when their mines closed, the towns vanished. McDowell County covers much of the Flat Top-Pocahontas Coalfield and a small portion of the Williamson Coalfield.

== Flat Top-Pocahontas Coalfield ==
- Algoma
- Anawalt
- Asco (abandoned)
- Ashland
- Bartley
- Berwind
- Big Four
- Bishop
- Bradshaw
- Capels
- Caretta
- Carswell
- Cherokee
- Crumpler
- Cucumber
- Davy
- Eckman (abandoned)
- Eight (abandoned)
- Elbert
- Elkhorn
- English
- Excelsior
- Filbert
- Gary
- Gilliam
- Hartwell currently called Vallscreek
- Havaco
- Hemphill
- Jed
- Jenkinjones
- Keystone
- Kimball
- Landgraff
- Leckie
- Maitland
- Maybeury
- Mohegan (abandoned)
- Northfork
- Pageton
- Powhatan
- Premier
- Ream
- Superior
- Switchback
- Thorpe
- Twin Branch
- Venus
- Vivian
- War
- Warriormine
- Welch
- Wilcoe
- Yukon (abandoned)

== Williamson Coalfield ==
- Iaeger
- Litwar
- Panther
