= Elkhorn Creek (Tug Fork tributary) =

Location
- Country: United States
- State: West Virginia
- County: McDowell, Mercer

Physical characteristics
- Source: Coaldale Mountain
  - location: Mercer County, West Virginia
  - coordinates: 37°20′50″N 81°20′20″W
  - elevation: 2,674 ft (815 m)
- Mouth: Tug Fork
  - location: Welch, West Virginia
  - coordinates: 37°25′49″N 81°35′10″W
  - elevation: 1,296 ft (395 m)

Basin features
- Tributaries
  - right: North Fork Elkhorn Creek

Elkhorn Creek is a 23.7-mile-long (38.1 km) tributary of the Tug Fork, belonging to the Ohio River and Mississippi River watersheds. It is located in McDowell and Mercer counties in the U.S. state of West Virginia. Elkhorn Creek is also known as Elkhorn Fork and Elkhorn River.

According to tradition, Elkhorn Creek was named after an incident when a pioneer hunter displayed an elk's horn near the creek's mouth.

== Tributaries ==
Tributary streams are listed from source to mouth.

- Angle Hollow
- Turkey Gap Branch
- Johns Knob Branch
- Lick Branch
- Trace Branch
- North Fork Elkhorn Creek
  - Bearwallow Branch
  - Buzzard Branch
- Burk Creek
- Clark Branch
- Coalbank Branch
- Big Branch
- Bottom Creek
- Rockhouse Branch
- Laurel Branch
- Upper Belcher Branch
- Lick Branch
- Meetinghouse Branch
- Mill Creek

== List of cities and towns along Elkhorn Creek ==
- Big Four
- Bottom Creek
- Eckman
- Elkhorn
- Ennis
- Keystone
- Kimball
- Kyle
- Landgraff
- Maitland
- Maybeury
- Northfork
- Powhatan
- Superior
- Switchback
- Upland
- Vivian
- Welch

== See also ==
- List of West Virginia rivers
