= Anawalt Lake Wildlife Management Area =

State Wildlife Management Area in McDowell County, West Virginia

Anawalt Lake WMA
- IUCN category V (protected landscape/seascape)
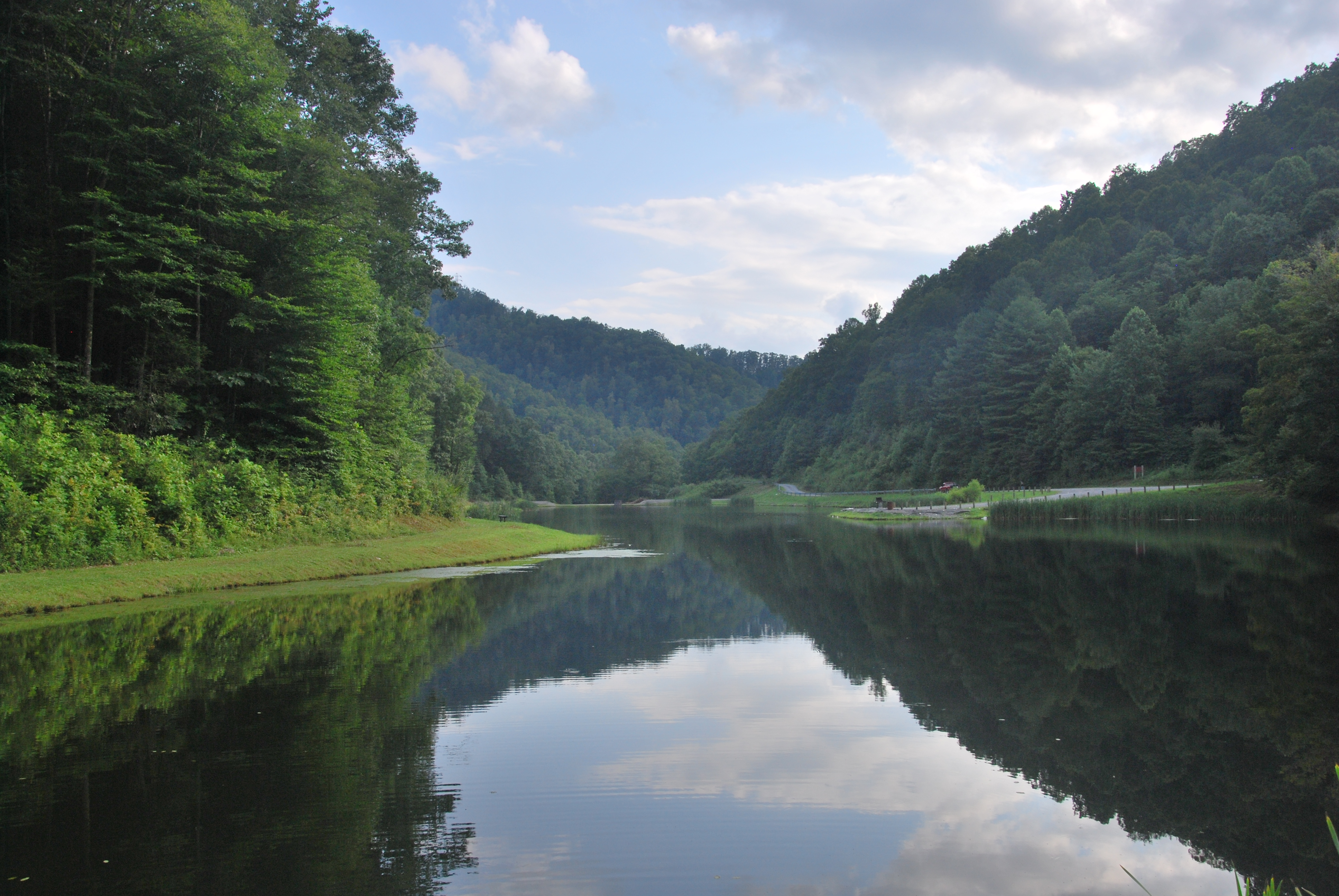
- Anawalt Lake in 2013

- Location within West Virginia
- Location: McDowell County, West Virginia, United States
- Nearest city: Bluefield, West Virginia
- Coordinates: 37°19′7″N 81°25′19″W
- Area: 1,792 acres (7.25 km^{2})
- Named for: James White Anawalt, namesake of Anawalt, WV
- Operator: Wildlife Resources Section, WVDNR

Anawalt Lake Wildlife Management Area is a 1,792-acre (725 ha) protected area located in McDowell County, West Virginia. It is managed by the Wildlife Resources Section of the West Virginia Division of Natural Resources.

The terrain at Anawalt lake is steep, and covered with a second-growth hardwood forest. A mixed oak-hickory forest habitat dominates the drier slopes, with yellow poplar and black cherry in the moister coves.

Anawalt Lake WMA is located about 20 miles (32 km) southeast of Welch. From Welch, follow West Virginia Route 103 to West Virginia Route 161, then to County Route 84 to Anawalt. Follow County Route 8 from Anawalt to Anawalt Lake WMA.

== Hunting and fishing ==
Hunting opportunities include bear, grouse, deer, squirrel, and turkey. Fishing opportunities in 7-acre (2.8 ha) Anawalt Lake include stocked trout, largemouth bass, bluegill and channel. The lake is accessible for the handicapped. Boating and live minnows bait is prohibited.

== See also ==
- Animal conservation
- Bear bag
- List of lakes of West Virginia
- List of West Virginia wildlife management areas
- Recreational fishing
