= Worth, West Virginia =

Worth
- Unincorporated community
- Location within West Virginia Worth (the United States)
- Coordinates: 37°24′53″N 81°23′23″W
- Country: United States
- State: West Virginia
- County: McDowell
- Elevation: 1,896 ft (578 m)
- Time zone: UTC-5 (Eastern (EST))
  - Summer (DST): UTC-4 (EDT)
- Area codes: 304 & 681
- GNIS feature ID: 1549423

Worth is an unincorporated community in McDowell County, West Virginia, United States. Worth is 3 miles (4.8 km) east of Northfork.

The community was named after Worth Kilpatrick, a coal mining official.
