= Johnnycake (disambiguation) =

Johnnycake is a flatbread. Johnnycake may also refer to:

- Johnnycake, West Virginia
- Johnnycake Town
- Johnny Cakes (The Sopranos)
