= Lila, West Virginia =

Lila
- Unincorporated community
- Location within West Virginia Lila (the United States)
- Coordinates: 37°19′18″N 81°26′27″W
- Country: United States
- State: West Virginia
- County: McDowell
- Elevation: 1,759 ft (536 m)
- Time zone: UTC-5 (Eastern (EST))
  - Summer (DST): UTC-4 (EDT)
- Area codes: 304 & 681
- GNIS feature ID: 1541957

Lila is an unincorporated community in McDowell County, West Virginia, United States. Lila is 1 mile (1.6 km) south of Anawalt.
