= Collins Ridge =

Collins Ridge may refer to:

- Collins Ridge (Antarctica)
- Rockridge, West Virginia, US, originally named Collins Ridge
