= The Welch News =

- Type: Weekly newspaper
- Format: Broadsheet
- Owner: The Welch Daily News Inc.
- Publisher: Melissa Nester
- Founded: 1927
- Headquarters: 125 Wyoming St, Welch, West Virginia 24801 United States
- Circulation: 3,201 (as of 2016)
- Price: 50 cents
- Website: welchnews.com

The Welch News was a weekly week evening newspaper, as of 2022, based in Welch, West Virginia, with circulation in all communities in McDowell County and limited circulation in Wyoming County. Until 2022, it was published Monday, Wednesday, and Friday, with a circulation of 3,201 and is owned by Moffit Newspapers. After nearly 100 years of service, it closed suddenly on March 13, 2023.

== History ==
The newspaper was founded in 1927 as the Welch Daily News and published on a six-day evening basis. The paper has declined along with the decline of McDowell County, which has lost eighty percent of its peak population in 1955 by 2010. In 1975, the paper ended its Saturday edition, publishing Monday–Friday afternoons. In the 1980s the paper ended subscriptions to most comics and syndicated columns, as well as subscriptions to national wire services, and began to cover local events only. In 1995, the paper began its tri-weekly publishing schedule. The Welch News was the only newspaper published in McDowell County. Cell and internet service is limited and there are no locally-based radio or television stations.

While the official company name remains "The Welch Daily News, Inc.", the front-page nameplate masthead was shortened to The Welch News when the publication schedule was reduced from five days per week (Monday through Friday) to the schedule of three days per week (Monday, Wednesday and Friday). The Welch News has been operating in the same location on Wyoming Street in Welch since it was established in 1927. It was announced on April 26, 2018 that the newspaper will end publication on May 7, 2018 but on May 4, 2018 it was announced that the paper would continue publishing and continue to serve the local community.

On January 28, 2020, The Welch News announced their new website, www.welchnews.com. Until 2022, it was published Monday, Wednesday, and Friday, with a circulation of 3,201 and is owned by Moffit Newspapers. After nearly 100 years of service, it closed suddenly on March 13, 2023.
