= Monson, West Virginia =

Monson
- Unincorporated community
- Location within West Virginia Monson (the United States)
- Coordinates: 37°15′54″N 81°28′58″W
- Country: United States
- State: West Virginia
- County: McDowell
- Elevation: 1,965 ft (599 m)
- Time zone: UTC-5 (Eastern (EST))
  - Summer (DST): UTC-4 (EDT)
- Area codes: 304 & 681
- GNIS feature ID: 1543502

Monson is an unincorporated community in McDowell County, West Virginia, United States. Monson is located along West Virginia Route 161, 5.5 miles (8.9 km) south-southwest of Anawalt.
