= John Ellison =

American/Canadian musician

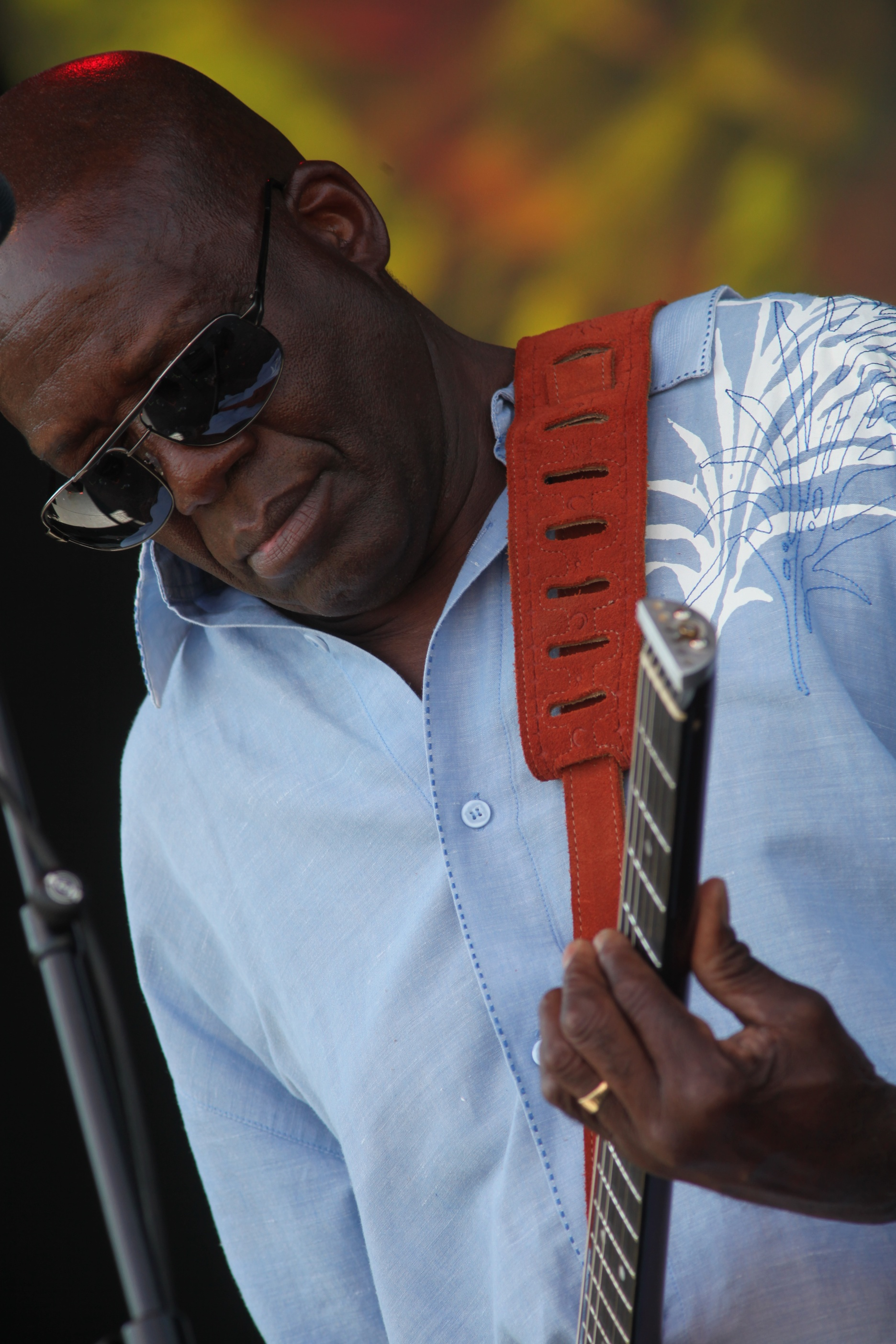
- Ellison at the 2010 Greenbelt Harvest Picnic

Background information
- Born: Willie John Ellison; 11 August 1941 (age 85); Montgomery, West Virginia, United States
- Origin: Rochester, New York, United States
- Occupations: Writer, composer, musician
- Instrument: Guitar
- Years active: 1960s-present
- Formerly of: Soul Brothers Six

John Ellison (born 11 August 1941) is an American/Canadian musician, best known for writing the song "Some Kind of Wonderful." He was born in Montgomery, West Virginia, and was raised in Landgraff, West Virginia, a small, poverty-stricken coal mining village near Welch, West Virginia, and is a dual citizen of the United States and Canada, receiving his Canadian citizenship in 2006.

== Biography ==
John was born Willie John Ellison to Joseph Ellison and Ella Mae Leonard in Eagle, Fayette, West Virginia. In the mid-1960s, Ellison traveled to Rochester, New York, where he met the original members of the Soul Brothers Five, becoming the sixth member and prompting the band to change its name to the Soul Brothers Six. The other members of the group included Charles Armstrong, Harry Armstrong, Vonnell Benjamin, Lester Pelemon, and Joe Johnson. The group signed a recording contract with Atlantic Records.

Ellison was the lead guitarist, singer, and songwriter for the group; and while traveling to a recording session in Philadelphia in 1967, Ellison wrote "She's Some Kind of Wonderful." This original version reached number 91 on the US Billboard chart. In 1987, the book Sweet Soul Music named the Soul Brothers Six as a major influence on the sound of modern music. Not only has the trademark bass line in "She's Some Kind of Wonderful" been utilized by countless other artists for a variety of different songs, but the song has also earned the Soul Brothers Six a spot in music history. More than 50 different artists have recorded "She's Some Kind of Wonderful," making it one of the most recorded songs in the history of music. In 1995, Ellison received a citation of achievement from Broadcast Music for writing the third-most played song in the world.

After the Soul Brothers Six broke up in the 1970s, Ellison continued to record and perform. In 1993 he released his first solo album, Welcome Back, followed by Missing You in 2000. In 2007, he released his third solo album, Back. He is a regular performer at the Nice Jazz Festival in France, and also performs regularly throughout Europe, Asia and North America.

In November 2008, Ellison was nominated for Male Vocalist of the Year, and for R&B/Soul Recording of the Year, for Back at the Hamilton Music Awards in Hamilton, Ontario. He also performed at the awards ceremony. On 6 December 2009, he was honored with the Arcelor Mittal Dofasco Lifetime Achievement Award and performed at the Hamilton Music Awards.

Ellison released his autobiography, Some Kind of Wonderful: The John Ellison Story, in July 2012. This work explores the racism and violence Ellison encountered and examines the relationship between these experiences and his songwriting.

In July 2013, a site near his childhood home in Landgraff, West Virginia, was cleared by Boy Scouts and other volunteers, as part of a service project connected to the 2013 National Boy Scout Jamboree. Plans are pending to build a replica of his boyhood home to house a museum dedicated to Ellison's music and his early life in the local mine camp community of Landgraff.

In October 2015, Ellison was formally inducted into the West Virginia Music Hall of Fame.

In 2020 Ellison released the awareness single "Wake-Up Call (Black Like Me)" co-composed, produced and arranged by Dutch producer Roger Heijster with good reviews in e.g., Rolling Stone and Forbes Magazine. The song was nominated "Song of the Year 2021" by Pop Awards.

On 11 August 2023 (his 82nd birthday) John released a new version of his classic "Some Kind of Wonderful", which serves as the title track for an album featuring eleven new songs penned by Ellison and produced and arranged by Roger Heijster. The single was on the first round of ballots in the category "Best American Roots Performance" for the 66th Grammy Awards nominations. On 29 December 2023, the second single "If I Had Just One Wish", a feel-good catchy reggae vibe calling for more love, peace and harmony, was released. The collection was dropped digitally, on CD as well as vinyl on 26 January 2024, from PopMi Music.

On 5 May 2024, John was inducted into the Rochester (NY) Music Hall Of Fame.
