= Hemphill, West Virginia =

Hemphill
- Unincorporated community
- Location within the state of West Virginia Hemphill (the United States)
- Coordinates: 37°26′41″N 81°35′43″W
- Country: United States
- State: West Virginia
- County: McDowell
- Time zone: UTC-5 (Eastern (EST))
  - Summer (DST): UTC-4 (EDT)
- GNIS feature ID: 1540139

Hemphill is an unincorporated community on the Tug Fork River in McDowell County, West Virginia, United States. It lies between Capels and Welch.
