= Gordon Lambert (American football) =

American football player (born 1945)

No. 53, 51, 88
- Position: Linebacker

Personal information
- Born: July 5, 1945 (age 81); Leckie, West Virginia, U.S.
- Listed height: 6 ft 5 in (1.96 m)
- Listed weight: 245 lb (111 kg)

Career information
- High school: Gary (Gary, West Virginia)
- College: West Virginia (1964–1965); Tennessee-Martin (1966–1967)
- NFL draft: 1968: 4th round, 91st overall pick

Career history
- Denver Broncos (1968–1969); Las Vegas Cowboys (1969); New York Giants (1972)*
- * Offseason or practice squad member only

Career NFL statistics
- Games played: 14
- Stats at Pro Football Reference

Gordon Olaf Lambert (born July 5, 1945) is an American former professional football player who was a linebacker for two seasons with the Denver Broncos of the American Football League (AFL). He played college football for the West Virginia Mountaineers and Tennessee-Martin Volunteers.

== Early life and college ==
Gordon Olaf Lambert was born on July 5, 1945, in Leckie, West Virginia. He attended Gary High School in Gary, West Virginia.

Lambert was a two-year letterman for the Mountaineers of West Virginia University from 1964 to 1965. He was then a two-year letterman for the Volunteers of the University of Tennessee, Martin Branch from 1966 to 1967 as a defensive end. He was the defensive MVP of the 1967 Tangerine Bowl. Lambert was also the South team's MVP in the 1967 North–South Shrine Game. He was inducted into Tennessee–Martin's athletics hall of fame in 1985.

== Professional career ==
Lambert was selected by the Denver Broncos in the fourth round, with the 91st overall pick, of the 1968 NFL draft. He played in ten games for the Broncos during the 1968 season. He appeared in four games in 1969 before being released.

Lambert then finished the 1969 season with the Las Vegas Cowboys of the Continental Football League (COFL).

He signed with the New York Giants in 1972 but was later released.
