= Gilliam, West Virginia =

Unincorporated community in West Virginia, United States

Gilliam
- Unincorporated community
- 1946 photograph by Russell Lee of two family house in Black section of Gilliam

- Location within the state of West Virginia Gilliam (the United States)
- Coordinates: 37°25′26″N 81°24′54″W
- Country: United States
- State: West Virginia
- County: McDowell
- Time zone: UTC-5 (Eastern (EST))
  - Summer (DST): UTC-4 (EDT)
- GNIS feature ID: 1554553

Gilliam is an unincorporated community on the North Fork River in McDowell County, West Virginia, United States. It lies between Algoma and Rolfe along County Route 17.

The community was named after one Mr. Gilliam, a coal-mining official. As of 1899, the mine for which the community was built was reported to cover 1,100 acres, and employ 344. The 1924 topographical map shows more than fifty houses at Gilliam, with over thirty remaining in 1976, but only a few homes and businesses remain as of 2026. Gilliam had a post office from 1892 to at least 1971. The community lends its name to the nearby Gilliam Bottom Road at Rolfe.

Photographer Russell Lee took photographs of the town in 1946, and recorded that 60 percent of the mine workers at that time were Black, providing a concrete example of the Black migration that had occurred into McDowell County in preceding decades.

== See also ==
- List of ghost towns in West Virginia
