= Erin, West Virginia =

Unincorporated community in West Virginia, United States

Erin
- Unincorporated community
- Location within the state of West Virginia Erin (the United States)
- Coordinates: 37°26′29″N 81°41′33″W
- Country: United States
- State: West Virginia
- County: McDowell
- Time zone: UTC-5 (Eastern (EST))
  - Summer (DST): UTC-4 (EDT)
- GNIS feature ID: 1554410

Erin is an unincorporated community in McDowell County, West Virginia, United States. Erin is located on U.S. Route 52.
