= Sandy Huff, West Virginia =

Sandy Huff
- Unincorporated community
- Location within West Virginia Sandy Huff (the United States)
- Coordinates: 37°28′41″N 81°46′30″W
- Country: United States
- State: West Virginia
- County: McDowell
- Elevation: 1,014 ft (309 m)
- Time zone: UTC-5 (Eastern (EST))
  - Summer (DST): UTC-4 (EDT)
- Area codes: 304 & 681
- GNIS feature ID: 1555567

Sandy Huff is an unincorporated community in McDowell County, West Virginia, United States. Sandy Huff is located on the Tug Fork, 2 miles (3.2 km) east-northeast of Iaeger.
