= Skygusty, West Virginia =

Skygusty
- Unincorporated community
- Location within West Virginia Skygusty (the United States)
- Coordinates: 37°19′16″N 81°28′34″W
- Country: United States
- State: West Virginia
- County: McDowell
- Elevation: 1,552 ft (473 m)
- Time zone: UTC-5 (Eastern (EST))
  - Summer (DST): UTC-4 (EDT)
- ZIP codes: 24883
- Area codes: 304 & 681
- GNIS feature ID: 1555639

Skygusty is an unincorporated community in McDowell County, West Virginia, United States. Skygusty is located on West Virginia Route 161, 5 miles (8.0 km) southeast of Gary.
