= 1967 Tangerine Bowl =

American college football game

West Chester Golden Rams	Tennessee–Martin Volunteers
(10–0)	(9–1)
Pennsylvania State Colleges; Football Conference	Independent
8	25
Head coach: Bob Mitten	Head coach: Bob Carroll
	1	2	3	4	Total
West Chester	0	8	0	0	8
Tennessee–Martin	9	9	0	7	25
- Date: December 16, 1967
- Season: 1967
- Stadium: Tangerine Bowl
- Location: Orlando, Florida
- MVP: Errol Hook, Tennessee–Martin (offensive); Gordon Lambert, Tennessee–Martin (defensive)
- Attendance: 5500

The 1967 Tangerine Bowl was an NCAA College Division game following the 1967 season, between West Chester and Tennessee–Martin. The most valuable players were defensive end Gordon Lambert and quarterback Errol Hook, both of Tennessee–Martin.

== Background ==
The game was one of four regional finals in the College Division, the predecessor of Division II; the other three postseason games were the Pecan Bowl (also played on December 16), along with the Grantland Rice and Camellia bowls (both played on December 9).

== Notable participants ==
Tennessee–Martin's Lambert, and West Chester quarterback Jim Haynie, were selected in the 1968 NFL/AFL draft. Tennessee–Martin defensive end Julian Nunamaker was selected in the 1969 NFL/AFL draft. Multiple members of the Tennessee–Martin team – including Lambert, Hook, Nunamaker, quarterback Allan Cox, kicker Lee Mayo, left tackle Gary Doble, and head coach Bob Carroll – are inductees of the university's hall of fame. West Chester quarterback Jim Haynie, offensive end Don Wilkinson, running back Paul Dunkleberger, and head coach Bob Mitten are inductees of their university's hall of fame.

== Scoring summary ==
Scoring summary

Quarter	Time	Drive			Team	Scoring information	Score	
Quarter	Time	Plays	Yards	TOP	Team	Scoring information	WC	UTM
1	9:44				UTM	Jim Wiggins 2-yard touchdown run, Lee Mayo kick good	0	7
1	8:54				UTM	Jim Haynie tackled in end zone for a safety by Gordon Lambert	0	9
2	12:52				WC	Paul Dunkleberger 74-yard punt return, 2-point pass good (Don Wilkinson from Jim Haynie)	8	9
2		1	20		UTM	Gary Capers 20-yard touchdown reception from Allan Cox, Lee Mayo kick good	8	16
2					UTM	Jim Haynie tackled in end zone for a safety by Gordon Lambert	8	18
4					UTM	Errol Hook 4-yard touchdown run, Lee Mayo kick good	8	25
"TOP" = time of possession. For other American football terms, see Glossary of American football.							8	25

== Statistics ==
Program cover for 1967 game

Statistics	West Chester	Tennessee–Martin
First downs	14	20
Rushing yards	17	145
Passes attempted	35	32
Passes completed	18	12
Passes intercepted by	2	1
Passing yards	169	169
Yards penalized	96	88
Punts–average	10–35	7–42
Fumbles lost	1	0
Return Yardage	300	87
