= Jed, West Virginia =

Jed
- Unincorporated community
- Location within West Virginia Jed (the United States)
- Coordinates: 37°24′15″N 81°34′28″W
- Country: United States
- State: West Virginia
- County: McDowell
- Elevation: 1,401 ft (427 m)
- Time zone: UTC-5 (Eastern (EST))
  - Summer (DST): UTC-4 (EDT)
- Area codes: 304 & 681
- GNIS feature ID: 1554799

Jed is an unincorporated community in McDowell County, West Virginia, United States. It is located on West Virginia Route 103, 2 mi (3.2 km) south-southeast of Welch.
