= Rolfe, West Virginia =

Rolfe
- Unincorporated community
- Location within West Virginia Rolfe (the United States)
- Coordinates: 37°25′04″N 81°24′04″W
- Country: United States
- State: West Virginia
- County: McDowell
- Elevation: 1,860 ft (570 m)
- Time zone: UTC-5 (Eastern (EST))
  - Summer (DST): UTC-4 (EDT)
- Area codes: 304 & 681
- GNIS feature ID: 1555518

Rolfe is an unincorporated community in McDowell County, West Virginia, United States. Rolfe is 2 miles (3.2 km) east of Northfork.
