= Premier, West Virginia =

Premier
- Unincorporated community
- Location within the state of West Virginia Premier (the United States)
- Coordinates: 37°25′20″N 81°38′37″W
- Country: United States
- State: West Virginia
- County: McDowell
- Elevation: 1,470 ft (450 m)
- Time zone: UTC-5 (Eastern (EST))
  - Summer (DST): UTC-4 (EDT)
- ZIP code: 24878
- Area codes: 304 & 681
- GNIS feature ID: 1555405

Premier is an unincorporated community in McDowell County, West Virginia, United States. Premier is located along U.S. Route 52, 3.5 miles (5.6 km) west-southwest of Welch. Premier has a post office with ZIP code 24878.

The community most likely was named after the local Premier Coal Company.
