= Landgraff, West Virginia =

- Unincorporated community
- Location of Landgraff, West Virginia
- Coordinates: 37°24′42″N 81°28′25″W
- Country: United States
- State: West Virginia
- County: McDowell
- Elevation: 1,568 ft (478 m)
- Time zone: UTC-5 (Eastern (EST))
  - Summer (DST): UTC-4 (EDT)
- ZIP code: 24801
- Area codes: 304/681
- GNIS feature ID: 1554907

Landgraff is an unincorporated community in McDowell County, West Virginia, United States. It is located along U.S. Route 52 and Elkhorn Creek, approximately 6.4 miles (10.3 km) east of the county seat of Welch.

== History ==
Landgraff is one of many historical coal camps in the famed Pocahontas coalfield. The town is named after Constance Landgraff Andrews, the wife of a coal company executive.

== Landgraff today ==
In 2001 and 2002, a pair of devastating floods along Elkhorn Creek destroyed much of the town. Today, the only surviving historic building in Landgraff is the former Empire Coal & Coke Company "Miner's Clubhouse", which now serves as an historic inn bed-and-breakfast, the Elkhorn Inn and Theatre, which has a small "Museum Room" devoted to the area's history of coal mining and railroading. Coal trains continue to rumble through the heart of the area on Norfolk Southern Railway's (former Norfolk and Western Railway) Pocahontas Division. Area attractions which draw tourists from across the US and overseas include "railfanning" (train photography), fly-fishing for 24"-32" record-breaking trout on Elkhorn Creek, ATVing, golf, hiking, and historic sites connected to the Mine Wars.

Landgraff was the boyhood home of John Ellison, singer, musician and composer, most famous for composing and first performing the song "Some Kind of Wonderful". In July 2013 a lamp house once used by Empire Coal and Coke Co. and the land around it were cleared as part of a 2013 Boy Scouts of America National Jamboree service project. John Ellison and others plan to build a replica of his boyhood home at the site and utilize it and the existing lamp house as a museum facility to preserve the history of coal camp life in southern West Virginia and John Ellison's musical career.
