= Newhall, West Virginia =

Newhall
- Unincorporated community
- Location within the state of West Virginia Newhall (the United States)
- Coordinates: 37°15′49″N 81°37′07″W
- Country: United States
- State: West Virginia
- County: McDowell
- Elevation: 1,575 ft (480 m)
- Time zone: UTC-5 (Eastern (EST))
  - Summer (DST): UTC-4 (EDT)
- ZIP code: 24866
- Area codes: 304 & 681
- GNIS feature ID: 1555215

Newhall is an unincorporated community in McDowell County, West Virginia, United States. Newhall is located along West Virginia Route 16, 5 miles (8.0 km) southeast of War. Newhall has a post office with ZIP code 24866.
