= Mohegan, West Virginia =

Mohegan
- Unincorporated community
- Location within the state of West Virginia Mohegan (the United States)
- Coordinates: 37°27′11″N 81°37′50″W
- Country: United States
- State: West Virginia
- County: McDowell
- Time zone: UTC-5 (Eastern (EST))
  - Summer (DST): UTC-4 (EDT)

Mohegan is an unincorporated community on the Tug Fork River in McDowell County, West Virginia, United States. It sits at an altitude of 1,230 feet (375 m).

The community was named after the Mohegan tribe of Native Americans.
