= Rockridge, West Virginia =

Rockridge
- Unincorporated community
- Location within the state of West Virginia Rockridge (the United States)
- Coordinates: 37°22′36″N 81°49′36″W
- Country: United States
- State: West Virginia
- County: McDowell
- Time zone: UTC-5 (Eastern (EST))
  - Summer (DST): UTC-4 (EDT)
- GNIS feature ID: 1545998

Rockridge is an unincorporated community in McDowell County, West Virginia, United States. It was originally named Collins Ridge on account of a large share of the first settlers having the surname Collins. The present name is for the rocky soil near the original town site.
