= McDowell County, West Virginia =

County in West Virginia, United States

- County
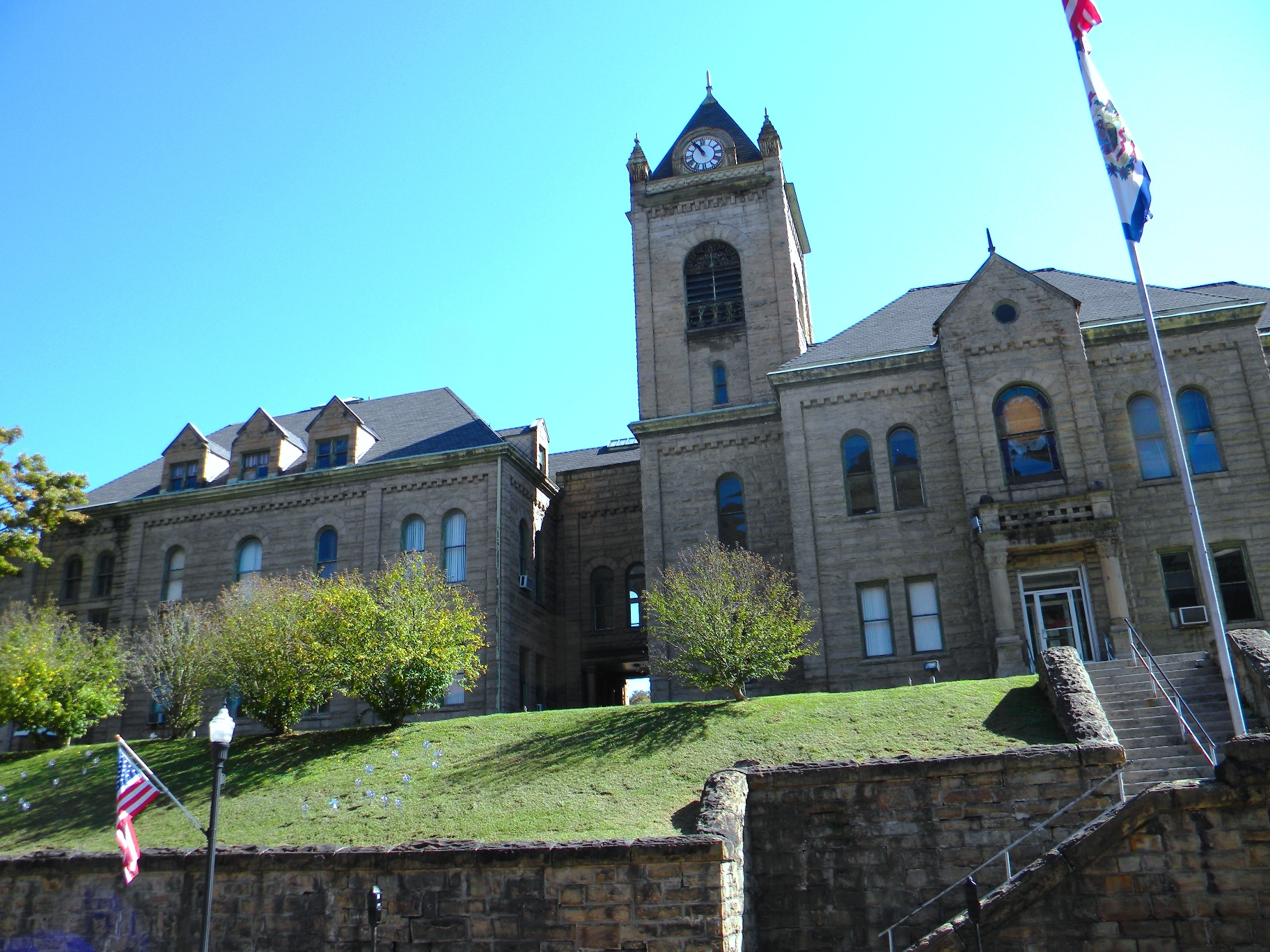
- The McDowell County Courthouse in Welch
- Nickname: Free State of McDowell
- Location within the U.S. state of West Virginia
- Coordinates: 37.38276°N 81.658204°W
- Country: United States
- State: West Virginia
- Founded: February 20, 1858
- Named for: James McDowell
- Seat: Welch
- Largest city: Welch

Area
  - Total: 534.899 sq mi (1,385.38 km^{2})
  - Land: 533.458 sq mi (1,381.65 km^{2})
  - Water: 1.441 sq mi (3.73 km^{2}) 0.27%

Population (2020)
  - Total: 19,111
  - Estimate (2025): 16,878 ▼
  - Density: 32.141/sq mi (12.410/km^{2})
- Demonym: McDowellian (Colloquial)
- Time zone: UTC−5 (Eastern)
  - Summer (DST): UTC−4 (EDT)
- Area code: 304 and 681
- Congressional district: 1st
- Website: mcdowellcountycommission.com

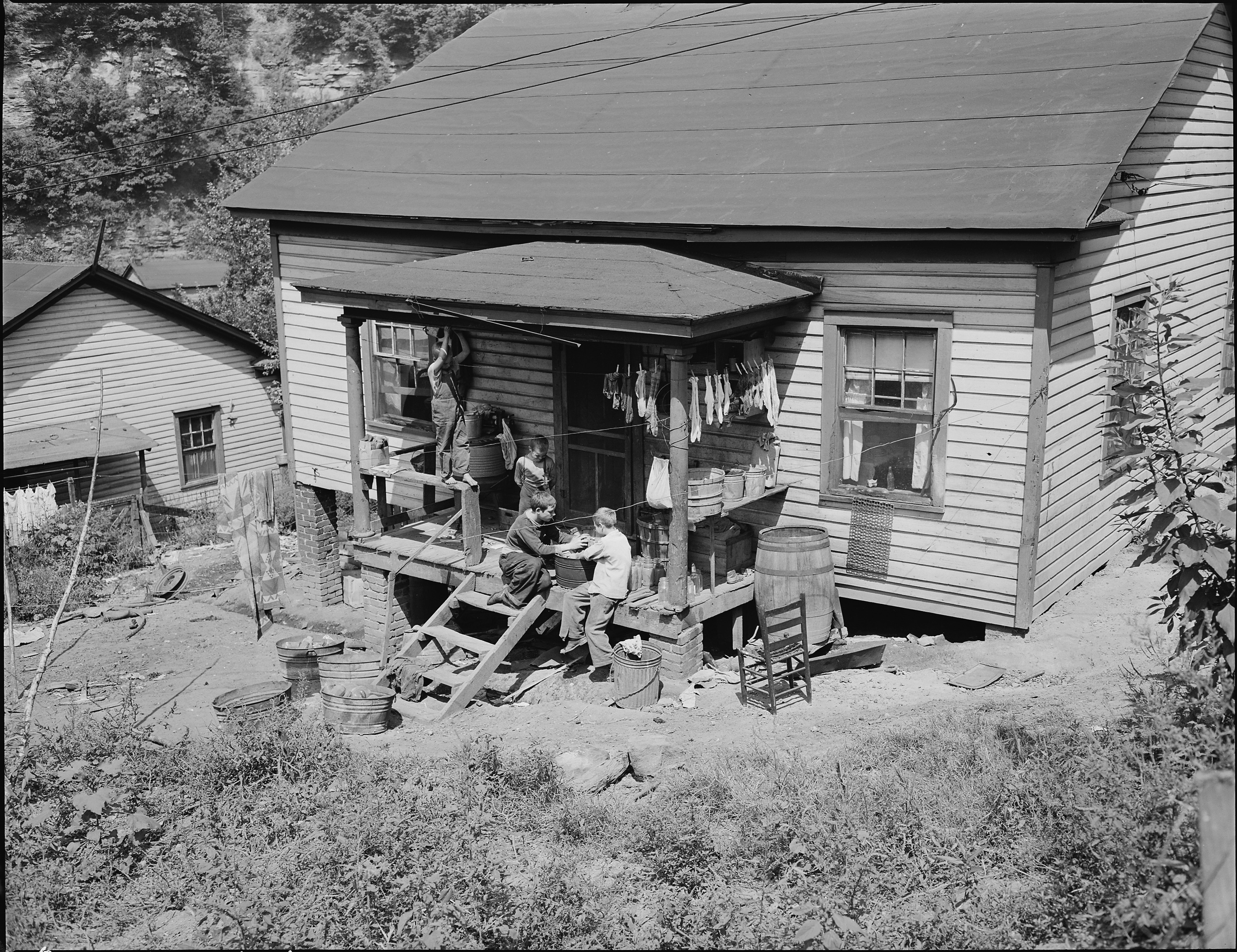
A coal miner's house and family, 1946

McDowell County is a county in the State of West Virginia. As of the 2020 census, the population was 19,111, and was estimated to be 16,878 in 2025.

The county seat and the largest city is Welch. McDowell County is the southernmost county in the state. It was created in 1858 by the Virginia General Assembly and named for Virginia Governor James McDowell. It became a part of West Virginia in 1863, when several Union-affiliated counties seceded from the state of Virginia during the American Civil War. McDowell County is located in the Cumberland Mountains, part of the Appalachia region.

Due mostly to a decline in employment in the coal mining industry, McDowell County's population has decreased from almost 100,000 in 1950 to less than 20,000 in 2020. The people of McDowell County suffer high rates of drug abuse and poverty and have a life expectancy well below the national average.

== History ==
On February 20, 1858, McDowell County was formed from the northern portion of Tazewell County, Virginia. In 1861, as the nation lurched toward civil war, delegates from McDowell County voted in favor of Virginia's secession from the United States. The northwestern counties of the region were Union-affiliated and voted to secede from Virginia the following year, but McDowell, Greenbrier, Logan, Mercer, Monroe, Pocahontas, Webster, and Wyoming counties in the southern section all refused to participate. The status of these eight counties would be decided by the United States Supreme Court in the case of Virginia v. West Virginia.

McDowell was one of fifty former Virginia counties that were recognized as the state of West Virginia on June 20, 1863. The same year, the residents of McDowell County chose Perryville, now English, then the most populous town, as their new county seat. However, in 1866 the state legislature relocated the county seat to a farm near the mouth of Mill Creek. There it remained until 1874, when it returned to Perryville. The location of the county seat remained in dispute until 1892, when it moved to Welch.

In 1863, West Virginia's counties were divided into civil townships, with the intention of encouraging local government. This proved impractical in the largely rural state, where population density was low. In 1872 the townships were converted into magisterial districts. McDowell County was divided into three districts: Big Creek, Elkhorn, and Sandy River. In the 1890s, Browns Creek District was formed from a portion of Elkhorn, and North Fork District was created from parts of Browns Creek and Elkhorn. A sixth district, Adkin, was created from part of Elkhorn District in the early 1900s. These districts remained stable until the 1980s, when Adkin, Elkhorn, and North Fork were consolidated into the district of North Elkin.

Referring to the unconventional demographics and political state of McDowell County, a local newspaper editor described the county as "the Free State of McDowell", a description that has stuck in the popular imagination. The origin of this moniker is unknown. Tom Whittico, the founder and first editor of The McDowell Times—the first African-American paper in West Virginia—said he used it because African Americans had greater electoral power, civil freedoms, and freedom from segregation in McDowell County than in other locations in the state.

McDowell County had the first World War One Memorial to honor black soldiers.

By the first half of the 20th century, McDowell County's economy was dominated by coal mining. In 1950, it was the "leading coal producing county" in the United States. Sixteen percent of the county's population in 1950 was employed in the coal mining sector. However, in the next few decades major breakthroughs in mechanization in the coal industry resulted in job declines. By 1960 the mining workforce had decreased from around 16,000 to around 7,000. Many people left because of the lack of jobs, but people with longstanding family ties were reluctant to do so.

While running for president, John F. Kennedy visited McDowell County and promised to send help if elected. His first executive order created the Food Stamps program and the first recipients of food stamps were in McDowell County. In May 1963, the increasing rate of poverty in McDowell County led President Kennedy to remark in a speech given in the city of Welch:

I don't think any American can be satisfied to find in McDowell County, in West Virginia, 20 or 25 percent of the people of that county out of work, not for 6 weeks or 12 weeks, but for a year, 2, 3, or 4 years.

== Geography ==
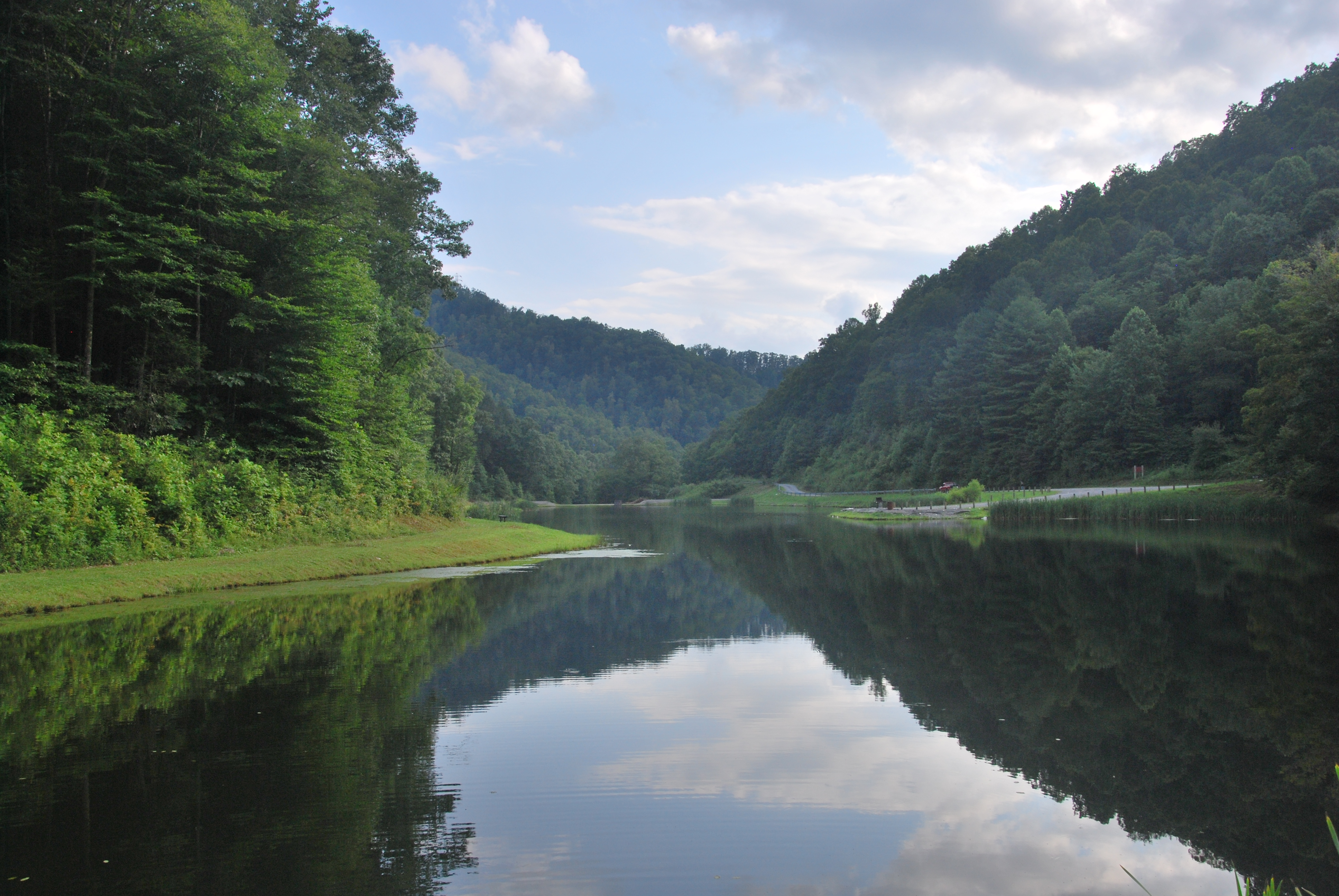
Anawalt Lake Wildlife Management Area in McDowell County

McDowell County is the southernmost county in West Virginia. It is bordered by Tazewell County, Virginia, to the south; Buchanan County, Virginia, to the west; Mingo County to the northwest; Wyoming County to the north; and Mercer County to the east. The county is located in the Cumberland Mountains, a sub-region of the Appalachian Mountains. The highest elevation in the county is approximately 1,036 m (3,399 ft) on the northwest slope of Flat Top Mountain.

According to the United States Census Bureau, the county has a total area of 534.899 square miles (1,385.38 km^{2}), of which 533.458 square miles (1,381.65 km^{2}) is land and 1.441 square miles (3.73 km^{2}) (0.27%) is water. It is the 13th largest county in West Virginia by total area. The county is roughly in the shape of a semi-circle, with the border following the mountains around the county.

== Demographics ==
Historical population
Census	Pop.	Note	%±
1860	1,535		—
1870	1,952		27.2%
1880	3,074		57.5%
1890	7,300		137.5%
1900	18,747		156.8%
1910	47,856		155.3%
1920	68,571		43.3%
1930	90,479		31.9%
1940	94,354		4.3%
1950	98,887		4.8%
1960	71,359		−27.8%
1970	50,666		−29.0%
1980	49,899		−1.5%
1990	35,233		−29.4%
2000	27,329		−22.4%
2010	22,113		−19.1%
2020	19,111		−13.6%
2025 (est.)	16,878	▼	−11.7%
U.S. Decennial Census; 1790–1960 1900–1990; 1990–2000 2010–2020

The county hit its peak of population in 1950 with almost 99,000 people, but job losses in the next decades caused sharp declines in population.

As of the first quarter of 2025, the median home value in McDowell County was $57,096.

As of the 2023 American Community Survey, there are 6,484 estimated households in McDowell County with an average of 2.51 persons per household. The county has a median household income of $29,980. Approximately 30.9% of the county's population lives at or below the poverty line. McDowell County has an estimated 28.5% employment rate, with 5.8% of the population holding a bachelor's degree or higher and 75.9% holding a high school diploma.

The top five reported ancestries (people were allowed to report up to two ancestries, thus the figures will generally add to more than 100%) were English (97.7%), Spanish (1.6%), Indo-European (0.4%), Asian and Pacific Islander (0.1%), and Other (0.1%).

The median age in the county was 43.6 years.

McDowell County, West Virginia – racial and ethnic composition
Note: the US Census treats Hispanic/Latino as an ethnic category. This table excludes Latinos from the racial categories and assigns them to a separate category. Hispanics/Latinos may be of any race.

Race / ethnicity (NH = non-Hispanic)	Pop. 1980	Pop. 1990	Pop. 2000	Pop. 2010	Pop. 2020
White alone (NH)	41,985 (84.14%)	30,258 (85.88%)	23,695 (86.70%)	19,637 (88.80%)	15,871 (83.05%)
Black or African American alone (NH)	7,306 (14.64%)	4,732 (13.43%)	3,234 (11.83%)	2,098 (9.49%)	2,139 (11.19%)
Native American or Alaska Native alone (NH)	25 (0.05%)	33 (0.09%)	46 (0.17%)	34 (0.15%)	20 (0.10%)
Asian alone (NH)	46 (0.09%)	26 (0.07%)	16 (0.06%)	15 (0.07%)	20 (0.10%)
Pacific Islander alone (NH)	—	—	2 (0.01%)	0 (0.00%)	4 (0.02%)
Other race alone (NH)	38 (0.08%)	2 (0.01%)	10 (0.04%)	7 (0.03%)	45 (0.24%)
Mixed race or multiracial (NH)	—	—	194 (0.71%)	231 (1.04%)	622 (3.25%)
Hispanic or Latino (any race)	499 (1.00%)	182 (0.52%)	132 (0.48%)	91 (0.41%)	390 (2.04%)
Total	49,899 (100.00%)	35,233 (100.00%)	27,329 (100.00%)	22,113 (100.00%)	19,111 (100.00%)

=== 2020 census ===
As of the 2020 census, there were 19,111 people, 7,483 households, and 4,627 families residing in the county. The population density was 35.8 inhabitants per square mile (13.8/km^{2}). 17.7% of residents were under the age of 18 and 19.2% were 65 years of age or older; the median age was 44.5 years. For every 100 females there were 118.8 males, and for every 100 females age 18 and over there were 121.6 males.

As of the 2020 census, the racial makeup of the county was 84.7% White, 11.3% Black or African American, 0.1% American Indian and Alaska Native, 0.1% Asian, 0.3% from some other race, and 3.4% from two or more races. Hispanic or Latino residents of any race comprised 2.0% of the population.

According to the 2020 census, 24.8% of households had children under the age of 18 living with them and 29.1% had a female householder with no spouse or partner present. About 32.8% of all households were made up of individuals and 13.9% had someone living alone who was 65 years of age or older.

According to the 2020 census, there were 9,344 housing units at an average density of 0.0 per square mile (0.0/km^{2}); 19.9% were vacant. Among occupied housing units, 79.5% were owner-occupied and 20.5% were renter-occupied. The homeowner vacancy rate was 1.5% and the rental vacancy rate was 8.4%.

=== 2010 census ===
As of the 2010 census, there were 22,113 people, 9,176 households, and 6,196 families residing in the county. The population density was 41.5 inhabitants per square mile (16.0/km^{2}). There were 11,322 housing units at an average density of 21.2 per square mile (8.2/km^{2}). The racial makeup of the county was 89.1% White, 9.5% Black or African American, 0.2% American Indian, 0.1% Asian, 0.0% from other races, and 1.1% from two or more races. Those of Hispanic or Latino origin made up 0.4% of the population. The largest ancestry groups were: 13.7% Irish, 12.0% German, 11.5% English, 8.0% American, 2.8% Sub-Saharan African, 2.7% Italian, 2.0% Dutch, and 1.1% Scotch-Irish.

There were 9,176 households, 28.7% had children under the age of 18 living with them, 48.1% were married couples living together, 13.9% had a female householder with no husband present, 32.5% were non-families, and 28.8% of all households were made up of individuals. The average household size was 2.36 and the average family size was 2.86. The median age was 43.8 years.

The median income for a household in the county was $22,154 and the median income for a family was $28,413. Males had a median income of $31,229 versus $26,776 for females. The per capita income for the county was $12,955. About 27.5% of families and 32.6% of the population were below the poverty line, including 44.3% of those under age 18 and 20.1% of those age 65 or over.

=== Life expectancy ===
Of the 3,142 counties in the United States in 2013, McDowell County ranked last in the life expectancy of both male and female residents. Males in McDowell County lived an average of 63.5 years and females lived an average of 71.5 years, compared to the national average for life expectancy of 76.5 for males and 81.2 for females. Moreover, the average life expectancy in McDowell County declined by 3.2 years for males and 4.1 years for females between 1985 and 2013, compared to a national average for the same period of an increased life span of 5.5 years for men and 3.1 years for women. High rates of smoking and obesity and a low level of physical activity appear to be contributing factors to the declining life expectancy for both sexes.

In 2020, the Robert Wood Johnson Foundation ranked McDowell County as 55th of the 55 counties in West Virginia in "health outcomes," as measured by length and quality of life.

==== Drug-induced deaths ====
Overdose death rates in the United States

In 2015, McDowell County had the highest rate of drug-induced deaths of any county in the United States, with 141 deaths per 100,000 people. The rate for the United States as a whole was 14.7 per 100,000 people. Neighboring Wyoming County had the second highest rate.

== Economy ==
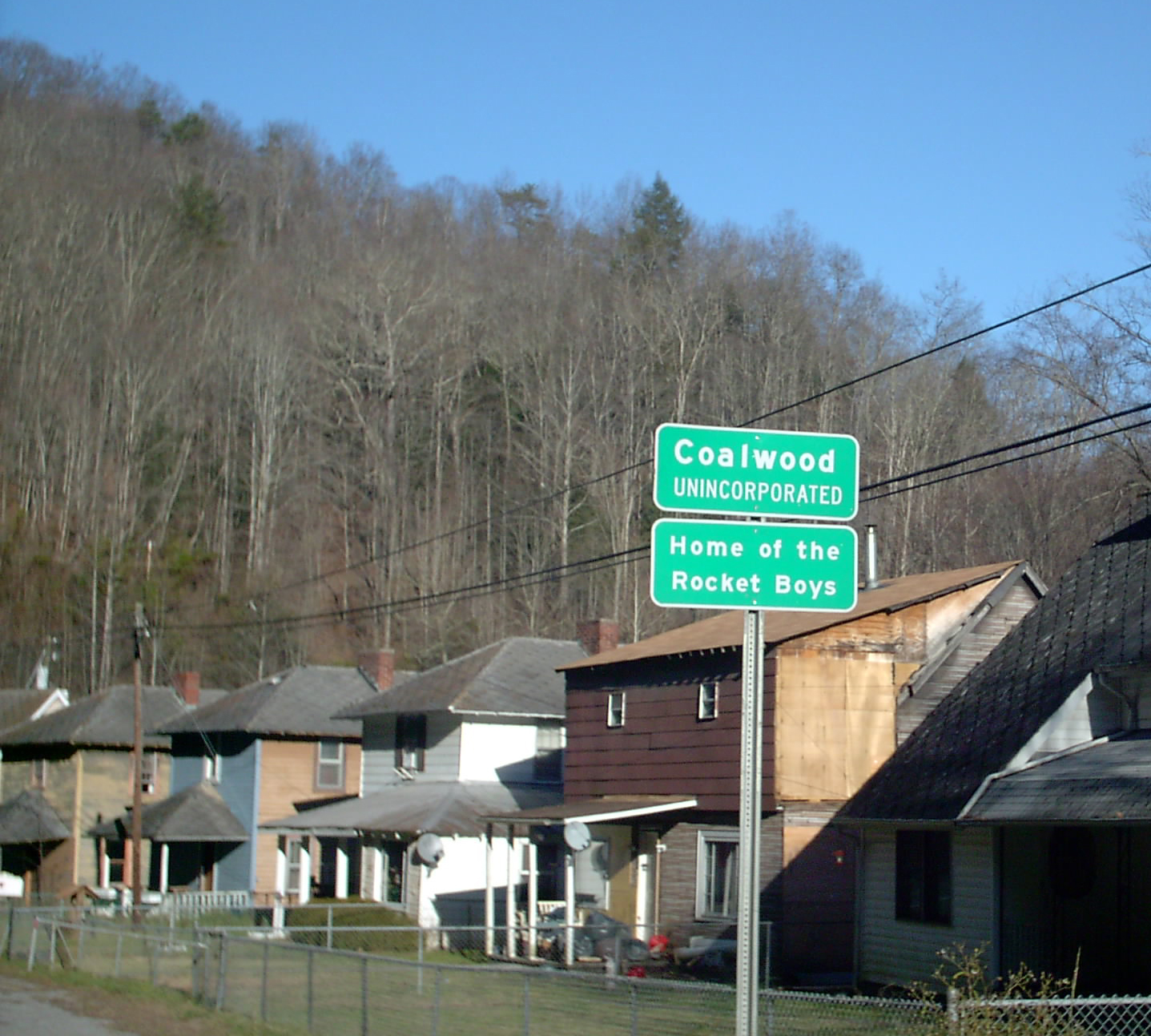
Coalwood, home of the 'Rocket Boys," who experimented with home-made rockets in the 1950s, the subject of the film October Sky

The county has been classified as a "food desert" by the USDA. In 2017, there were only two full-sized grocery stores to serve the county's 535 square miles (1,390 square kilometers). The county's only Walmart Supercenter, the county's largest employer, closed in 2016.

Financial services remain scant in the area. In 1999, The First National Bank of Keystone, the only bank located in the coal town of Keystone and the town's major employer at the time, was closed by the FDIC due to fraud. Management had been falsifying the bank's financial statements by booking income from loans the bank did not own, giving the appearance that the bank was generating large profits when it was in fact insolvent. At the height of the scandal, executives buried large volumes of documents in a trench in an attempt to conceal the fraud from the bank's accounting firm and from the Office of the Comptroller of the Currency.

=== Poverty ===
In 2022, McDowell was the 16th-poorest county in the U.S. (out of 3,143 counties), with a median annual household income of $28,235. The percentage of the population living in poverty was estimated at 37.6 percent. This compares with a median annual household income of $67,521 and a poverty rate of 11.4 percent in the U.S. as a whole.

== Politics ==
The power of industrial and mining political systems turned the county towards the Republican Party between 1890 and 1932, even supporting William Howard Taft during the divided 1912 presidential election. However, starting in 1936, the county realigned towards the Democratic Party, given its strong unionization in the coal mining sector, voting for the Democratic candidate in every election from 1936 to 2008 except Richard Nixon's 1972 landslide.

Since 1996, the county has trended Republican again, due to the prevailing environmentalist stances in the Democratic Party regarded as hostile towards coal mining interests. The county voted Republican in 2012 for the first time since 1972, and has since consistently voted Republican.

In 2024, Republican Donald Trump won the largest share of the vote ever for a Republican presidential nominee in the county, winning 79.45% of the vote. It was the second lowest-income county Trump won, after Owsley County, Kentucky.

United States presidential election results for McDowell County, West Virginia
Year	Republican		Democratic		Third party(ies)	
Year	No.	%	No.	%	No.	%
1912	4,341	46.54%	2,497	26.77%	2,489	26.69%
1916	7,086	65.62%	3,692	34.19%	20	0.19%
1920	12,198	70.58%	5,068	29.33%	16	0.09%
1924	12,422	62.95%	5,561	28.18%	1,749	8.86%
1928	14,810	64.02%	8,294	35.85%	31	0.13%
1932	16,069	56.35%	12,365	43.36%	80	0.28%
1936	9,975	28.11%	25,471	71.79%	35	0.10%
1940	13,906	36.26%	24,449	63.74%	0	0.00%
1944	11,023	36.35%	19,300	63.65%	0	0.00%
1948	9,687	30.78%	21,545	68.46%	240	0.76%
1952	10,663	30.19%	24,657	69.81%	0	0.00%
1956	11,138	39.77%	16,865	60.23%	0	0.00%
1960	6,555	25.16%	19,501	74.84%	0	0.00%
1964	3,684	16.95%	18,046	83.05%	0	0.00%
1968	4,020	21.23%	12,842	67.81%	2,075	10.96%
1972	8,942	56.76%	6,811	43.24%	0	0.00%
1976	4,107	28.01%	10,557	71.99%	0	0.00%
1980	3,862	27.70%	9,822	70.44%	259	1.86%
1984	4,284	33.25%	8,546	66.34%	53	0.41%
1988	2,463	25.36%	7,204	74.16%	47	0.48%
1992	1,941	19.84%	7,019	71.76%	821	8.39%
1996	1,550	18.88%	5,989	72.97%	669	8.15%
2000	2,348	32.15%	4,845	66.34%	110	1.51%
2004	2,762	37.84%	4,501	61.67%	36	0.49%
2008	2,882	44.82%	3,430	53.34%	118	1.84%
2012	3,959	63.98%	2,109	34.08%	120	1.94%
2016	4,629	74.11%	1,438	23.02%	179	2.87%
2020	5,148	78.87%	1,333	20.42%	46	0.70%
2024	4,310	79.45%	1,036	19.10%	79	1.46%

== Government ==
Position	Name
Commissioner	Robert D. Dotson
Commissioner	Cecil Patterson
Commissioner	Michael Brooks
Prosecuting Attorney	Brittany Puckett
Sheriff	James Muncy
County Assessor	Sherry Burton
County Clerk	Donald Hicks
Circuit Clerk	Francine Spencer

== Education ==
McDowell County Schools covers the entire county, and operates the county's public K-12 education system of 7 elementary schools, 2 middle schools, and 2 public high schools. The high schools are Mount View High School and River View High School. The county also has a private school, Twinbranch Pentecostal Christian Academy which is located in Twinbranch.

McDowell County Schools were under state control as a 'take-over' county from 2001 to 2013. Some medical services have been brought onsite into schools to reduce student absenteeism among families with only one car, and personal items such as sneakers and backpacks are now made available to students. A mixed use, multistory building in Welch aimed at reducing the housing shortage for teachers opened in 2022.

== In popular culture ==
Melville Davisson Post used McDowell County as the setting of his short story "Once In Jeopardy". This 1890s tale of the working out of a legal problem is rich in description of the people, customs, politics, and recent history of the area, including the impact of the railroad coming through and the rise of Republican influence.

Author and NASA engineer Homer Hickam grew up in Coalwood, McDowell County. His memoir Rocket Boys, which was adapted into a 1999 Hollywood film, is based on his childhood amateur rocket building experiences in Coalwood.

The Peabody Award winning interactive documentary film, Hollow: An Interactive Documentary directed by Elaine McMillion Sheldon, takes place in McDowell County.

== Transportation ==
=== Major highways ===
- U.S. Route 52
- West Virginia Route 16
- West Virginia Route 80
- West Virginia Route 83
- West Virginia Route 103
- West Virginia Route 161
- West Virginia Route 635

The West Virginia Division of Highways is currently trying to construct new highways, such as U.S. Route 121, known as the Coalfields Expressway.

=== Airport ===
The county had one airport, Welch Municipal Airport, which has closed indefinitely.

== Communities ==
=== Cities ===
- Gary
- Keystone
- War
- Welch (county seat)

=== Towns ===
- Anawalt
- Bradshaw
- Davy
- Iaeger
- Kimball
- Northfork

=== Magisterial districts ===
- Big Creek
- Browns Creek
- North Elkin
- Sandy River

=== Census-designated places ===
- Bartley
- Berwind
- Big Sandy
- Crumpler
- Cucumber
- Maybeury
- Pageton
- Raysal
- Roderfield
- Vivian

=== Unincorporated communities ===
- Algoma
- Apple Grove
- Asco
- Ashland
- Atwell
- Avondale
- Beartown
- Big Four
- Bishop (partial)
- Black Wolf
- Bottom Creek
- Canebrake
- Capels
- Caretta
- Carlos
- Carswell
- Coalwood
- Eckman
- Elbert
- Elkhorn
- English
- Ennis
- Erin
- Faraday
- Filbert
- Gilliam
- Havaco
- Hemphill
- Hensley
- Hull
- Isaban (partial)
- Jacobs Fork
- Jed
- Jenkinjones
- Johnnycake
- Jolo
- Kyle
- Landgraff
- Leckie
- Lex
- Lila
- Litwar
- Maitland
- Marine
- McDowell
- Mohawk
- Mohegan
- Monson
- Newhall
- Panther
- Paynesville (partial)
- Powhatan
- Premier
- Ream
- Rift
- Rockridge
- Rolfe
- Sandy Huff
- Six
- Skygusty
- Squire
- Superior
- Switchback
- Thorpe
- Twin Branch
- Union City
- Upland
- Vallscreek
- Venus
- Warriormine
- Wilcoe
- Worth
- Yerba
- Yukon

== See also ==
- Anawalt Lake Wildlife Management Area
- Berwind Lake Wildlife Management Area
- Coal camps in McDowell County, West Virginia
- National Register of Historic Places listings in McDowell County, West Virginia
- McDowell County Schools
- Panther Wildlife Management Area
- Pocahontas Coalfield
- Tyler Edward Hill
