= Superior, West Virginia =

Superior
- Unincorporated community
- Location within West Virginia Superior (the United States)
- Coordinates: 37°25′16″N 81°32′32″W
- Country: United States
- State: West Virginia
- County: McDowell
- Elevation: 1,414 ft (431 m)
- Time zone: UTC-5 (Eastern (EST))
  - Summer (DST): UTC-4 (EDT)
- Area codes: 304 & 681
- GNIS feature ID: 1558393

Superior is an unincorporated community in McDowell County, West Virginia, United States. Superior is located on U.S. Route 52, 2.5 miles (4.0 km) east-southeast of Welch.

The community most likely was named after the Lake Superior Coal Company.
