= Powhatan, West Virginia =

Powhatan
- Unincorporated community
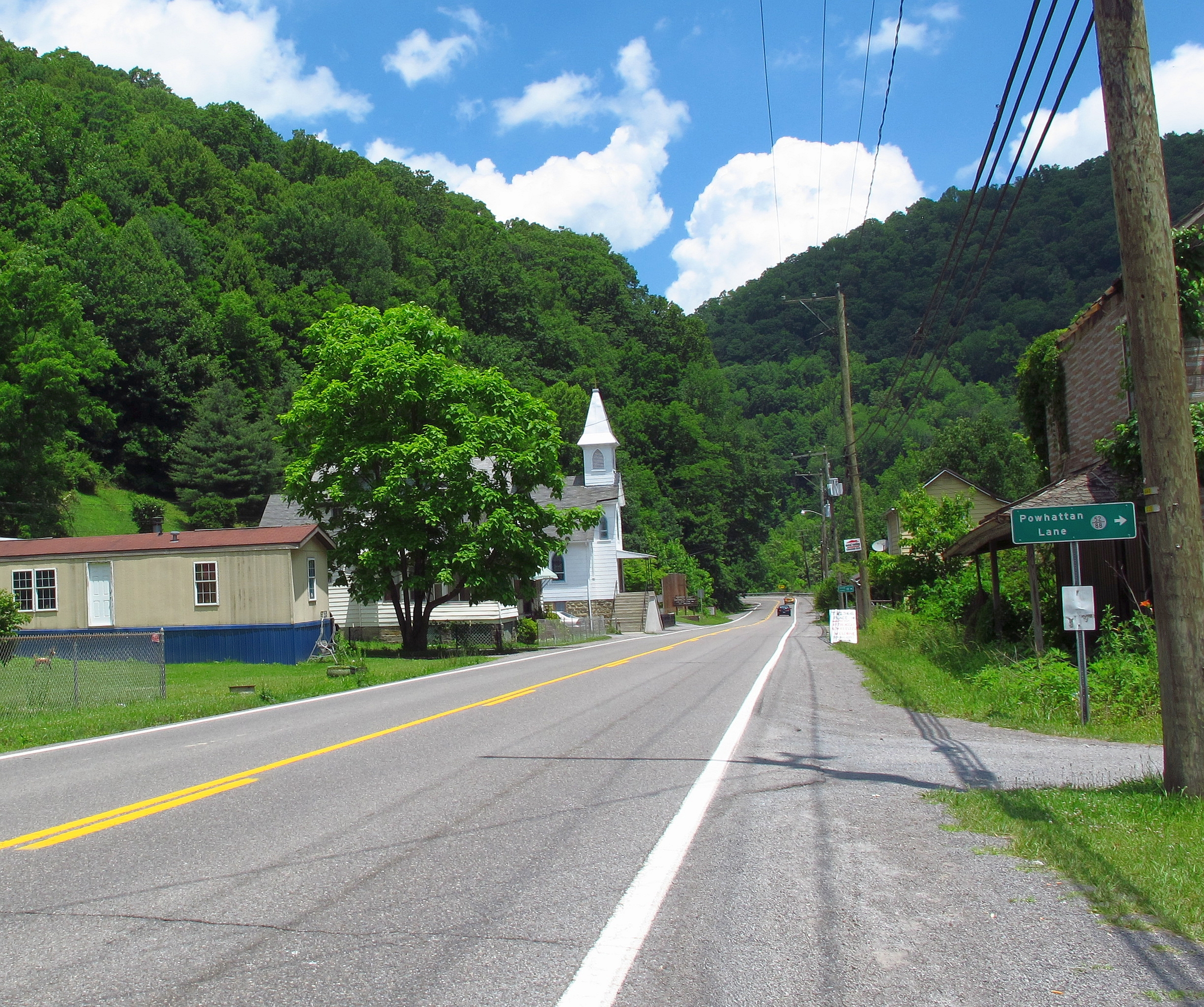
- Looking north on Coal Heritage Road in Powhatan

- Location within the state of West Virginia Powhatan (the United States)
- Coordinates: 37°24′4″N 81°25′11″W
- Country: United States
- State: West Virginia
- County: McDowell
- Time zone: UTC-5 (Eastern (EST))
  - Summer (DST): UTC-4 (EDT)
- ZIP codes: 24877
- GNIS feature ID: 1555402

Powhatan is an unincorporated community in McDowell County, West Virginia, United States, located approximately 1 mile (1.6 km) from Northfork.

The community probably derived its name from the local Powhatan Coal Company.
