= Asco, West Virginia =

Unincorporated community in West Virginia, United States

Asco
- Unincorporated community
- Location within the state of West Virginia Asco (the United States)
- Coordinates: 37°30′7″N 81°37′33″W
- Country: United States
- State: West Virginia
- County: McDowell
- Elevation: 1,473 ft (449 m)
- Time zone: UTC-5 (Eastern (EST))
  - Summer (DST): UTC-4 (EDT)
- ZIP codes: 24809
- GNIS feature ID: 1553757

Asco is an unincorporated community located in McDowell County, West Virginia, United States. Asco was originally known as Atlantic. The current name derives from the American Smokeless Coal Company (ASCO). It lies at the end of a line of the Norfolk and Western Railroad in Davy Branch hollow.
