= Litwar, West Virginia =

Litwar
- Unincorporated community
- Location within West Virginia Litwar (the United States)
- Coordinates: 37°28′53″N 81°50′18″W
- Country: United States
- State: West Virginia
- County: McDowell
- Elevation: 961 ft (293 m)
- Time zone: UTC-5 (Eastern (EST))
  - Summer (DST): UTC-4 (EDT)
- Area codes: 304 & 681
- GNIS feature ID: 1554976

Litwar is an unincorporated community in McDowell County, West Virginia, United States. Litwar is located on the Tug Fork, 2 miles (3.2 km) west-northwest of Iaeger.

The community's name most likely was derived from nearby Little War Creek.

The town is on the Norfolk Southern Railway (former Norfolk and Western) network.
