= Johnnycake, West Virginia =

Johnnycake
- Unincorporated community
- Location within West Virginia Johnnycake (the United States)
- Coordinates: 37°28′56″N 81°49′01″W
- Country: United States
- State: West Virginia
- County: McDowell
- Elevation: 1,050 ft (320 m)
- Time zone: UTC-5 (Eastern (EST))
  - Summer (DST): UTC-4 (EDT)
- Area codes: 304 & 681
- GNIS feature ID: 1540953

Johnnycake is an unincorporated community in McDowell County, West Virginia, United States. Johnnycake is located on U.S. Route 52, north of Iaeger.
