= Maitland, West Virginia =

Maitland
- Unincorporated community
- Location within the state of West Virginia Maitland (the United States)
- Coordinates: 37°25′43″N 81°33′05″W
- Country: United States
- State: West Virginia
- County: McDowell
- Elevation: 1,329 ft (405 m)
- Time zone: UTC-5 (Eastern (EST))
  - Summer (DST): UTC-4 (EDT)
- Area codes: 304 & 681
- GNIS feature ID: 1555027

Maitland is an unincorporated community in McDowell County, West Virginia, United States. Maitland is located on U.S. Route 52, 2 miles (3.2 km) east of Welch.

The elevation of Maitland is approximately 1,328 to 1,330 feet above sea level.

In the early 2000s (2001–2002), Maitland experienced severe flooding along the Elkhorn River, which resulted in the destruction of more than half of the community and the removal of several homes.

== History ==
Maitland was named by a mine official for unknown reasons.
