= Leckie, West Virginia =

Leckie
- Unincorporated community
- Location within West Virginia Leckie (the United States)
- Coordinates: 37°20′42″N 81°25′04″W
- Country: United States
- State: West Virginia
- County: McDowell
- Elevation: 1,755 ft (535 m)
- Time zone: UTC-5 (Eastern (EST))
  - Summer (DST): UTC-4 (EDT)
- ZIP codes: 24856
- Area codes: 304 & 681
- GNIS feature ID: 1554934

Leckie is an unincorporated community in McDowell County, West Virginia, United States. Leckie is 1 mile (1.6 km) northeast of Anawalt.

The community was named after William Leckie, a mining official.
