= Panther, West Virginia =

Panther
- Unincorporated community
- Location within the state of West Virginia Panther (the United States)
- Coordinates: 37°29′00″N 81°53′45″W
- Country: United States
- State: West Virginia
- County: McDowell
- Elevation: 948 ft (289 m)
- Time zone: UTC-5 (Eastern (EST))
  - Summer (DST): UTC-4 (EDT)
- ZIP code: 24872
- Area codes: 304 & 681
- GNIS feature ID: 1555299

Panther is an unincorporated community in McDowell County, West Virginia, United States. Panther is located along the Tug Fork, 4.5 miles (7.2 km) west-northwest of Iaeger. Panther has a post office with ZIP code 24872.

The community was named after nearby Panther Creek.

The village is on the Norfolk Southern Railway (former Norfolk and Western) network.
