= McDowell County Courthouse (West Virginia) =

- U.S. National Register of Historic Places
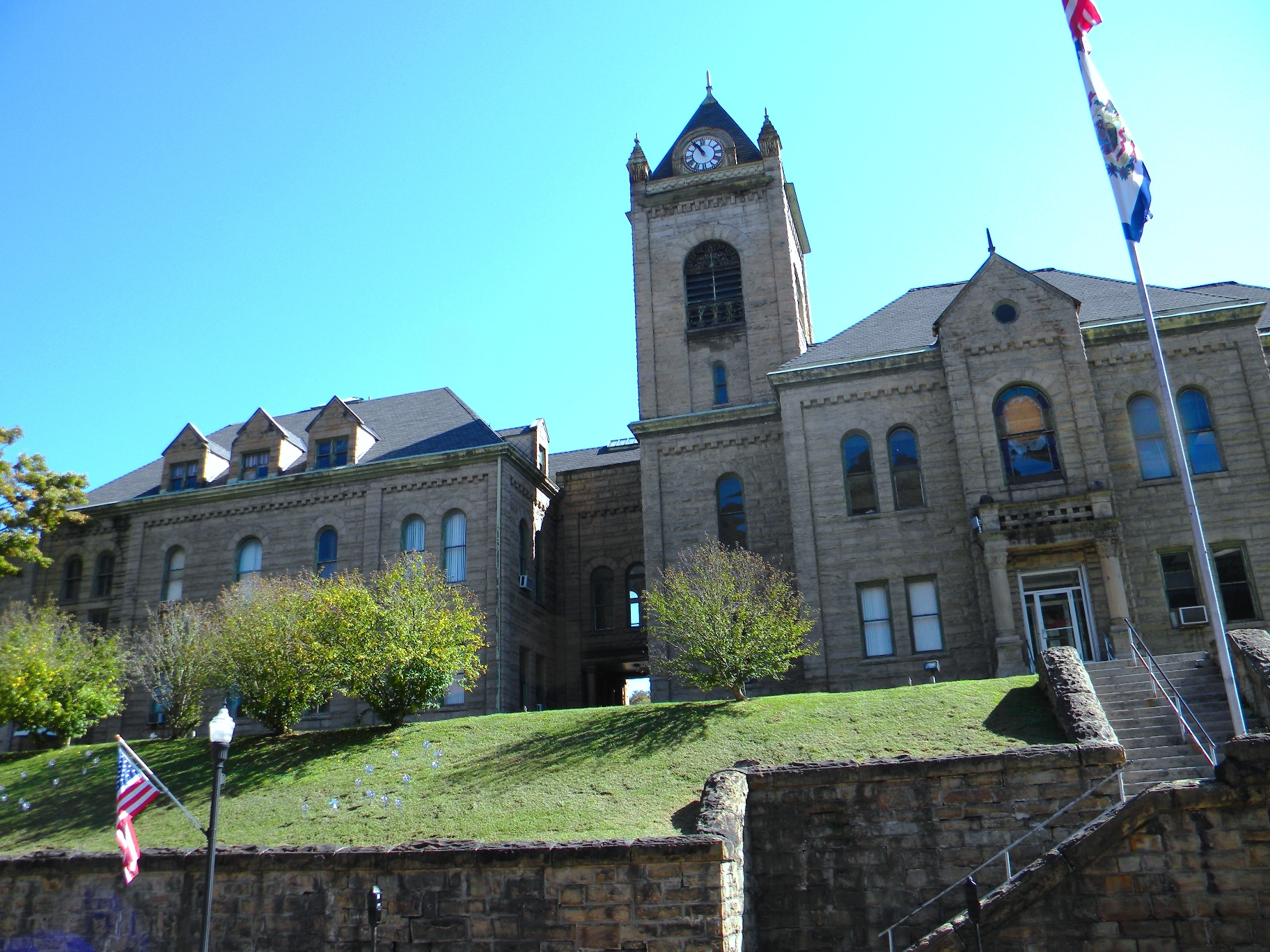

- Location within West Virginia Location within the United States
- Interactive map showing the location for McDowell County Courthouse
- Location: Wyoming St., Welch, West Virginia
- Coordinates: 37°25′57″N 81°35′3″W
- Built: 1893; 1909
- Architect: Frank P. Milburn (1893); W. E. & E. L. Shufflebarger (1909)
- Architectural style: Romanesque
- NRHP reference No.: 79003256
- Added to NRHP: August 29, 1979

The McDowell County Courthouse is a historic courthouse in Welch, West Virginia. It was placed on the National Register of Historic Places on August 29, 1979.

== History ==
The courthouse was built in two phases. The first part was built in 1893 in the Romanesque Revival style. It was the earliest independent work of architect Frank P. Milburn, then practicing in Kenova. Milburn would go on to be prolific designer of courthouses in the southern states. He reported that the original brick design had been built in stone, and that the jail had been turned around, but stated that "the contractors had done a good job of which they could justly be proud." Due to space constraints, the county decided to build an addition in 1908. W. E. & E. L. Shufflebarger of Bluefield were the architects chosen, and the complementary addition was completed in 1909. It was built to the north of the original structure.

In the courthouse yard, John Hardy, a black railroad worker, was hanged for murdering a man in Eckman, WV, then known as the Shawnee Coal Camp, over a gambling dispute. This January 19, 1894, execution was the subject of a song: "John Hardy," which remains a staple of folk, blues, and bluegrass music. John Hardy is thought to be the original John Henry.

On August 1, 1921, detectives from the Baldwin-Felts agency assassinated Matewan Police Chief Sid Hatfield on the courthouse steps. At that time, Hatfield was a major labor leader within the coalfields of West Virginia. His association with the United Mine Workers and Mary Harris 'Mother' Jones were nationally known. This act set the confrontational tone for labor relations within West Virginia.

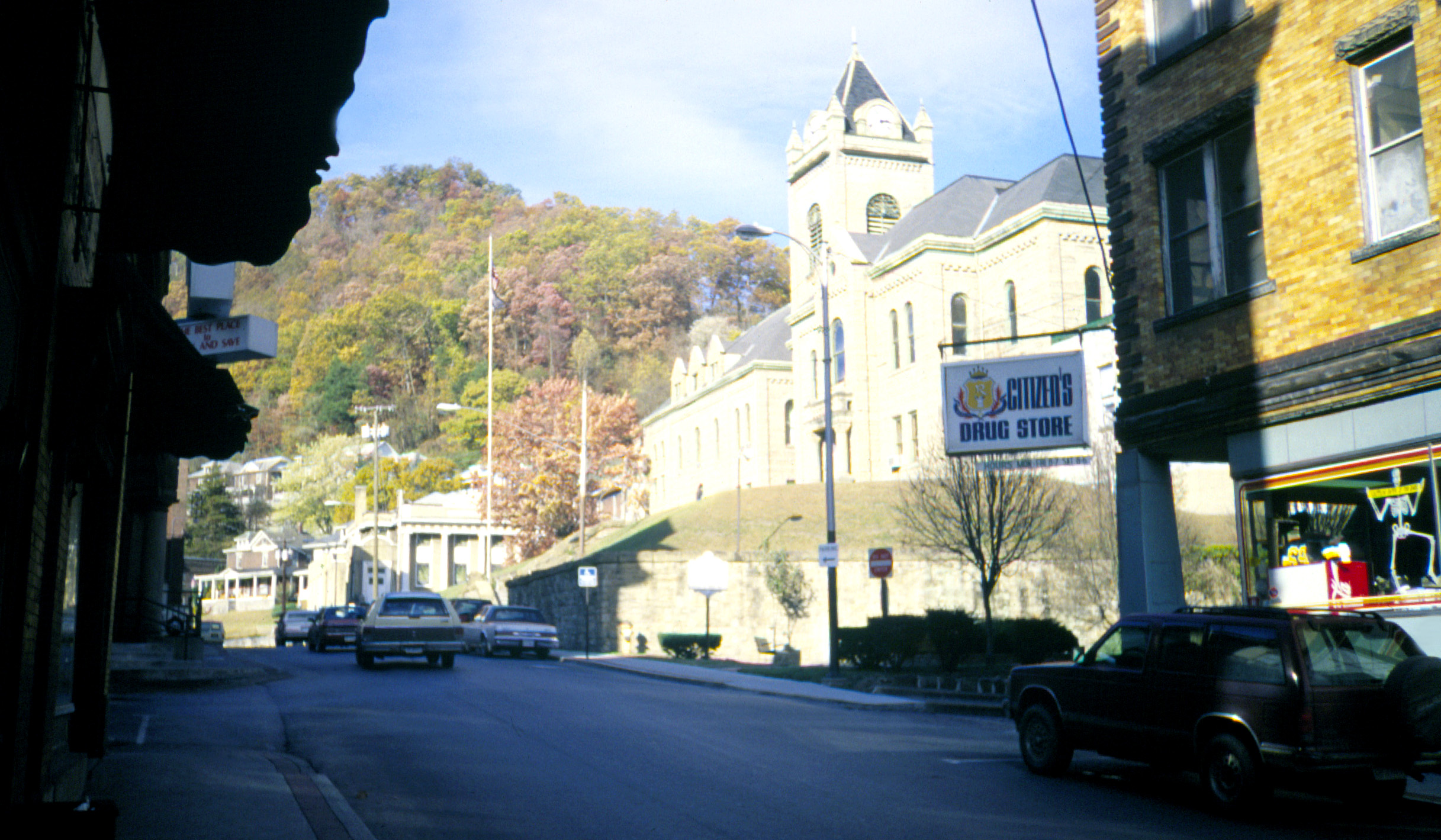
Another view
