= English, West Virginia =

Unincorporated community in West Virginia, United States

English
- Unincorporated community
- Location within the state of West Virginia English (the United States)
- Coordinates: 37°20′16″N 81°42′54″W
- Country: United States
- State: West Virginia
- County: McDowell
- Time zone: UTC-5 (Eastern (EST))
  - Summer (DST): UTC-4 (EDT)
- ZIP codes: 24832
- GNIS feature ID: 1554403

English is an unincorporated community in McDowell County, West Virginia, United States. Its post office was closed on November 9, 2002. It was the seat of its county until 1892, when it was moved to Welch. The town is on the Norfolk Southern Railway (former Norfolk and Western) network and also the Tug Fork river.
