= Eckman, West Virginia =

Unincorporated community in West Virginia, United States

Eckman
- Unincorporated community
- Location within the state of West Virginia Eckman (the United States)
- Coordinates: 37°24′16″N 81°27′51″W
- Country: United States
- State: West Virginia
- County: McDowell
- Time zone: UTC-5 (Eastern (EST))
  - Summer (DST): UTC-4 (EDT)
- ZIP codes: 24829
- GNIS feature ID: 1554363

Eckman is an unincorporated community in McDowell County, West Virginia, United States. Eckman is located along U.S. Route 52 to the west of the city of Keystone. Eckman was formerly known as Shawnee Camp. At Shawnee Camp, miner John Hardy reportedly murdered a man in a gambling dispute. His death was memorialized in the popular folk song, "John Hardy".
