= Big Four, West Virginia =

Unincorporated community in West Virginia, United States

Big Four
- Unincorporated community
- Location within the state of West Virginia Big Four (the United States)
- Coordinates: 37°24′53″N 81°31′14″W
- Country: United States
- State: West Virginia
- County: McDowell
- Time zone: UTC-5 (Eastern (EST))
  - Summer (DST): UTC-4 (EDT)
- GNIS feature ID: 1558348

Big Four is an unincorporated community located in McDowell County, West Virginia, United States. Their post office has been closed. Originally known as Cirrus, Big Four is reported to have been renamed for the four men who operated the coal mines in the area. It was once home to the lively and beloved restaurant, "The Chatterbox", which incidentally was the location of the infamous "privy debacle". It also was home to the Starland Drive-In Theater and a roller rink.

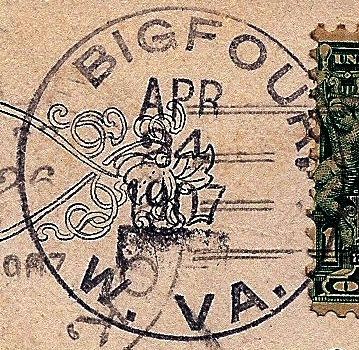
