= Capels, West Virginia =

Unincorporated community in West Virginia, United States

Capels
- Unincorporated community
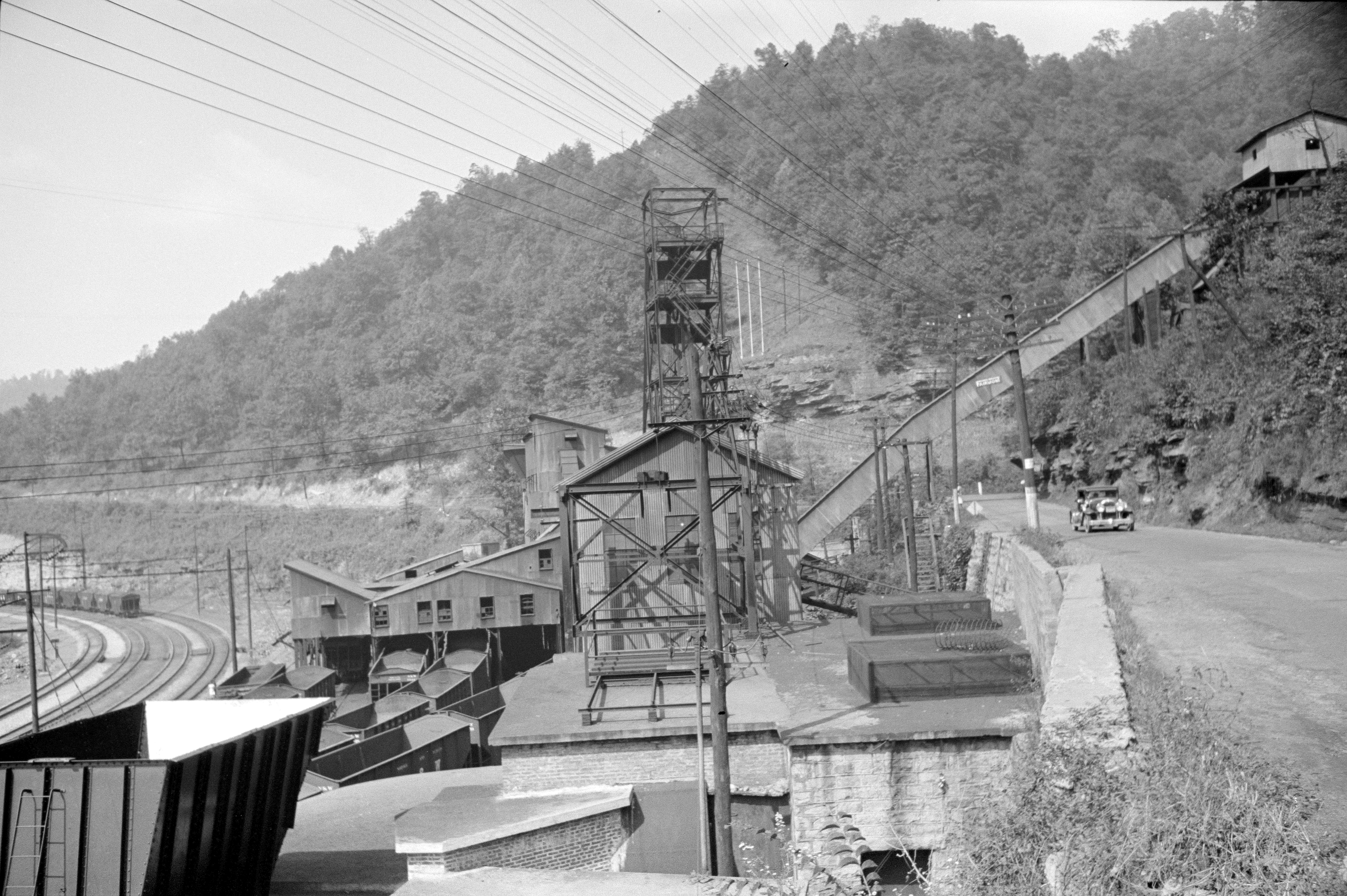
- Coal tipple in Capels, 1938. Photo by Marion Post Wolcott.

- Location within the state of West Virginia Capels (the United States)
- Coordinates: 37°27′16″N 81°36′5″W
- Country: United States
- State: West Virginia
- County: McDowell
- Elevation: 1,309 ft (399 m)
- Time zone: UTC-5 (Eastern (EST))
  - Summer (DST): UTC-4 (EDT)
- ZIP codes: 24820
- GNIS feature ID: 1554065

Capels is an unincorporated community on the Tug Fork River in McDowell County, West Virginia, United States.

Capels most likely was named after the local Capel family.
