= Northfork, West Virginia =

- Town
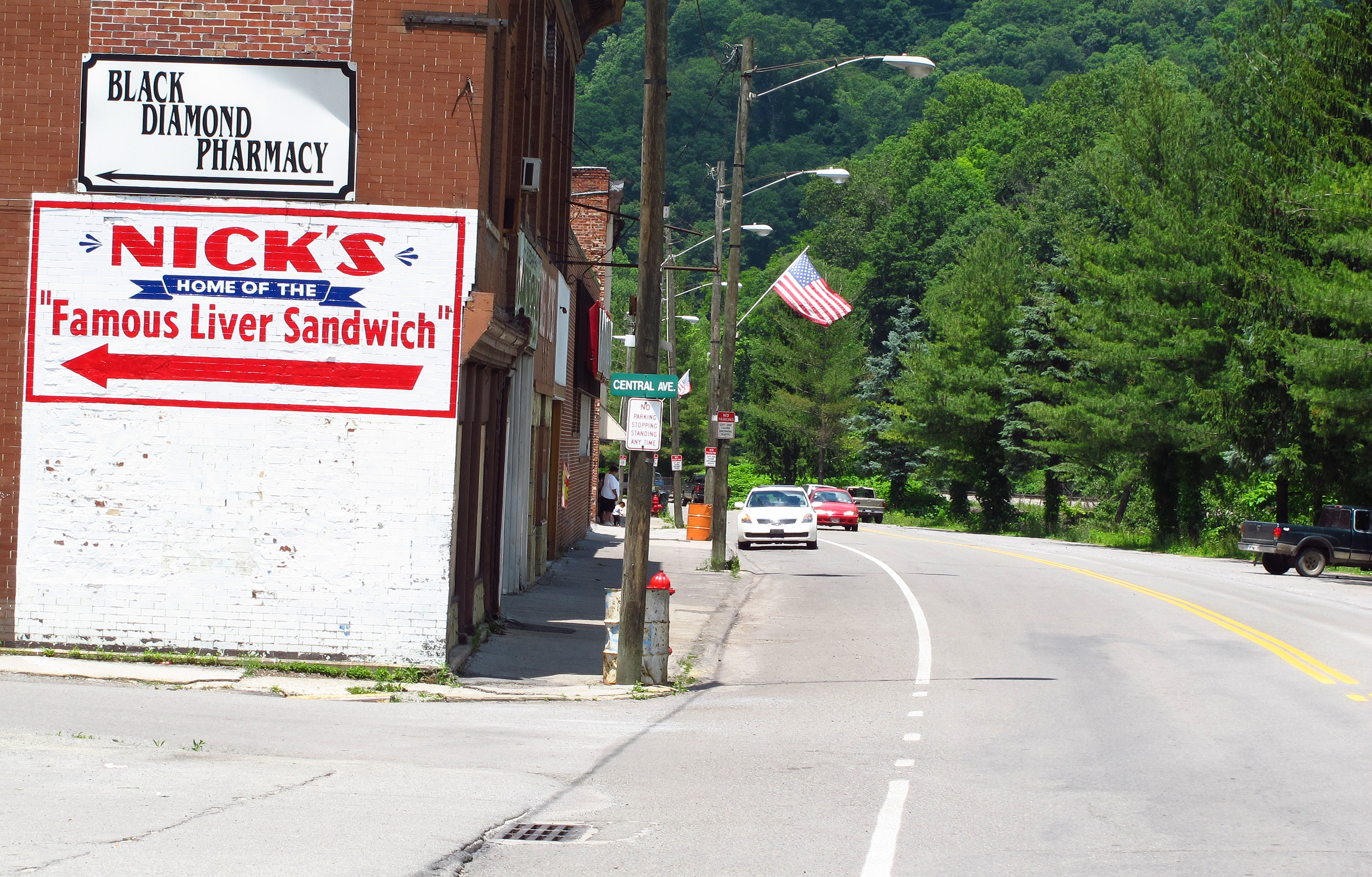
- Looking north on Coal Heritage Road in Northfork
- Nickname: Northfork Blue Demons
- Location of Northfork in McDowell County, West Virginia.

- Location within West Virginia Location within the United States
- Coordinates: 37°25′0″N 81°25′54″W
- Country: United States
- State: West Virginia
- County: McDowell

Government
  - Mayor: Carol Sizemore
  - Council Members: Mike Capparelli, Latonia Foster, Bernie Shupe, Curtis Spencer, Robert White Town Recorder: Gary L. Dove

Area
  - Total: 0.97 sq mi (2.50 km^{2})
  - Land: 0.97 sq mi (2.50 km^{2})
  - Water: 0 sq mi (0.00 km^{2})
- Elevation: 1,686 ft (514 m)

Population (2020)
  - Total: 231
  - Density: 348.7/sq mi (134.64/km^{2})
- Time zone: UTC-5 (Eastern (EST))
  - Summer (DST): UTC-4 (EDT)
- ZIP code: 24868
- Area code: 304
- FIPS code: 54-59428
- GNIS feature ID: 1544237
- Website: local.wv.gov/northfork/Pages/default.aspx

Northfork is a town in McDowell County, West Virginia, United States, located on U.S. Route 52 between Welch and Bluefield.

The population was 231 at the 2020 census. Northfork was incorporated in 1901, so named because of its location on the north fork of the Elkhorn Creek at its junction with the south fork. It was consolidated with the town of Clark on March 26, 1948.

== Geography ==
According to the United States Census Bureau, the town has a total area of 0.96 square miles (2.49 km^{2}), all land. The town is on the Norfolk Southern Railway (former Norfolk and Western) network.

== Demographics ==
Historical population
| Census | Pop. | Note | %± |
|---|---|---|---|
| 1910 | 425 | | — |
| 1920 | 421 | | −0.9% |
| 1930 | 494 | | 17.3% |
| 1940 | 387 | | −21.7% |
| 1950 | 994 | | 156.8% |
| 1960 | 798 | | −19.7% |
| 1970 | 737 | | −7.6% |
| 1980 | 1,105 | | 49.9% |
| 1990 | 656 | | −40.6% |
| 2000 | 519 | | −20.9% |
| 2010 | 429 | | −17.3% |
| 2020 | 231 | | −46.2% |
U.S. Decennial Census

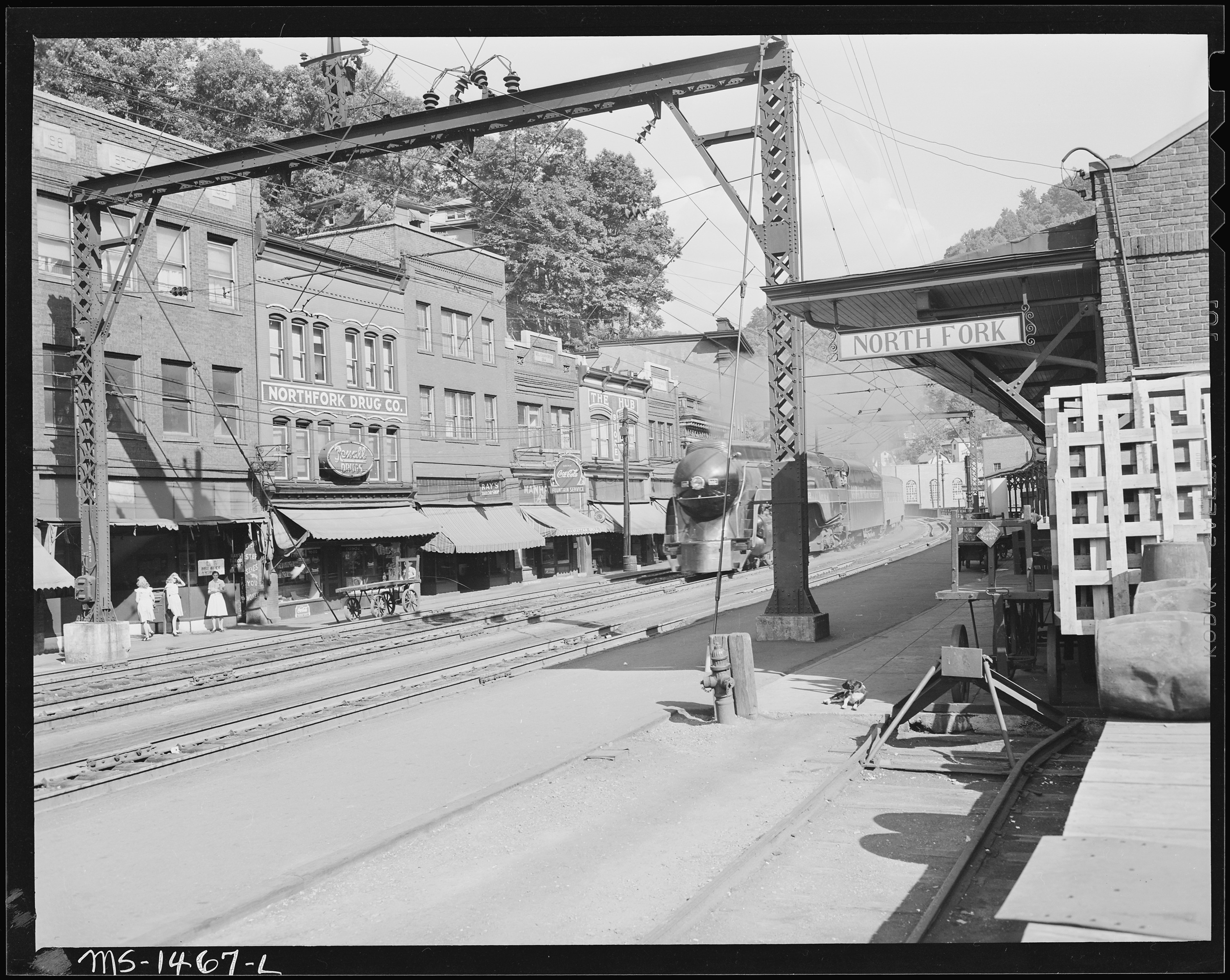
Northfork in 1946. Photo by Russell Lee.

=== 2020 census ===
Northfork town, West Virginia – Racial and ethnic composition Note: the U.S. census treats Hispanic/Latino as an ethnic category. This table excludes Latinos from the racial categories and assigns them to a separate category. Hispanics/Latinos may be of any race.
| Race / Ethnicity (NH = Non-Hispanic) | Pop 2000 | Pop 2010 | Pop 2020 | % 2000 | % 2010 | % 2020 |
|---|---|---|---|---|---|---|
| White alone (NH) | 229 | 181 | 77 | 44.12% | 42.19% | 33.33% |
| Black or African American alone (NH) | 278 | 244 | 140 | 53.56% | 56.88% | 60.61% |
| Native American or Alaska Native alone (NH) | 1 | 1 | 0 | 0.19% | 0.23% | 0.00% |
| Asian alone (NH) | 0 | 0 | 0 | 0.00% | 0.00% | 0.00% |
| Native Hawaiian or Pacific Islander alone (NH) | 0 | 0 | 0 | 0.00% | 0.00% | 0.00% |
| Other race alone (NH) | 0 | 0 | 0 | 0.00% | 0.00% | 0.00% |
| Mixed race or Multiracial (NH) | 9 | 2 | 12 | 1.73% | 0.47% | 5.19% |
| Hispanic or Latino (any race) | 2 | 1 | 2 | 0.39% | 0.23% | 0.87% |
| Total | 519 | 429 | 231 | 100.00% | 100.00% | 100.00% |

=== 2010 census ===
At the 2010 census there were 429 people, 173 households, and 108 families living in the town. The population density was 446.9 inhabitants per square mile (172.5/km^{2}). There were 242 housing units at an average density of 252.1 per square mile (97.3/km^{2}). The racial makeup of the town was 42.2% White, 57.1% African American, 0.2% Native American, and 0.5% from two or more races. Hispanic or Latino of any race were 0.2%.

Of the 173 households 26.0% had children under the age of 18 living with them, 33.5% were married couples living together, 21.4% had a female householder with no husband present, 7.5% had a male householder with no wife present, and 37.6% were non-families. 36.4% of households were one person and 16.8% were one person aged 65 or older. The average household size was 2.48 and the average family size was 3.24.

The median age in the town was 46.3 years. 23.1% of residents were under the age of 18; 5.2% were between the ages of 18 and 24; 20.6% were from 25 to 44; 33.6% were from 45 to 64; and 17.7% were 65 or older. The gender makeup of the town was 47.6% male and 52.4% female.

=== 2000 census ===
At the 2000 census there were 519 people, 229 households, and 130 families living in the town. The population density was 535.8 inhabitants per square mile (206.9/km^{2}). There were 298 housing units at an average density of 307.7 per square mile (118.8/km^{2}). The racial makeup of the town was 44.12% White, 53.95% African American, 0.19% Native American, and 1.73% from two or more races. Hispanic or Latino of any race were 0.39%.

Of the 229 households 21.8% had children under the age of 18 living with them, 29.3% were married couples living together, 24.9% had a female householder with no husband present, and 42.8% were non-families. 38.9% of households were one person and 20.1% were one person aged 65 or older. The average household size was 2.24 and the average family size was 3.03.

The age distribution was 22.5% under the age of 18, 8.1% from 18 to 24, 22.0% from 25 to 44, 23.3% from 45 to 64, and 24.1% 65 or older. The median age was 43 years. For every 100 females, there were 79.0 males. For every 100 females age 18 and over, there were 69.6 males.

The median household income was $16,544 and the median family income was $19,236. Males had a median income of $27,917 versus $20,781 for females. The per capita income for the town was $10,001. About 31.3% of families and 34.4% of the population were below the poverty line, including 52.6% of those under age 18 and 20.9% of those age 65 or over.

== Notable people ==
- Charlie Manuel, MLB baseball manager
- Tom Beasley - Washington Redskins

== See also ==
- List of U.S. communities with African-American majority populations in 2020
