= Anawalt, West Virginia =

- Town
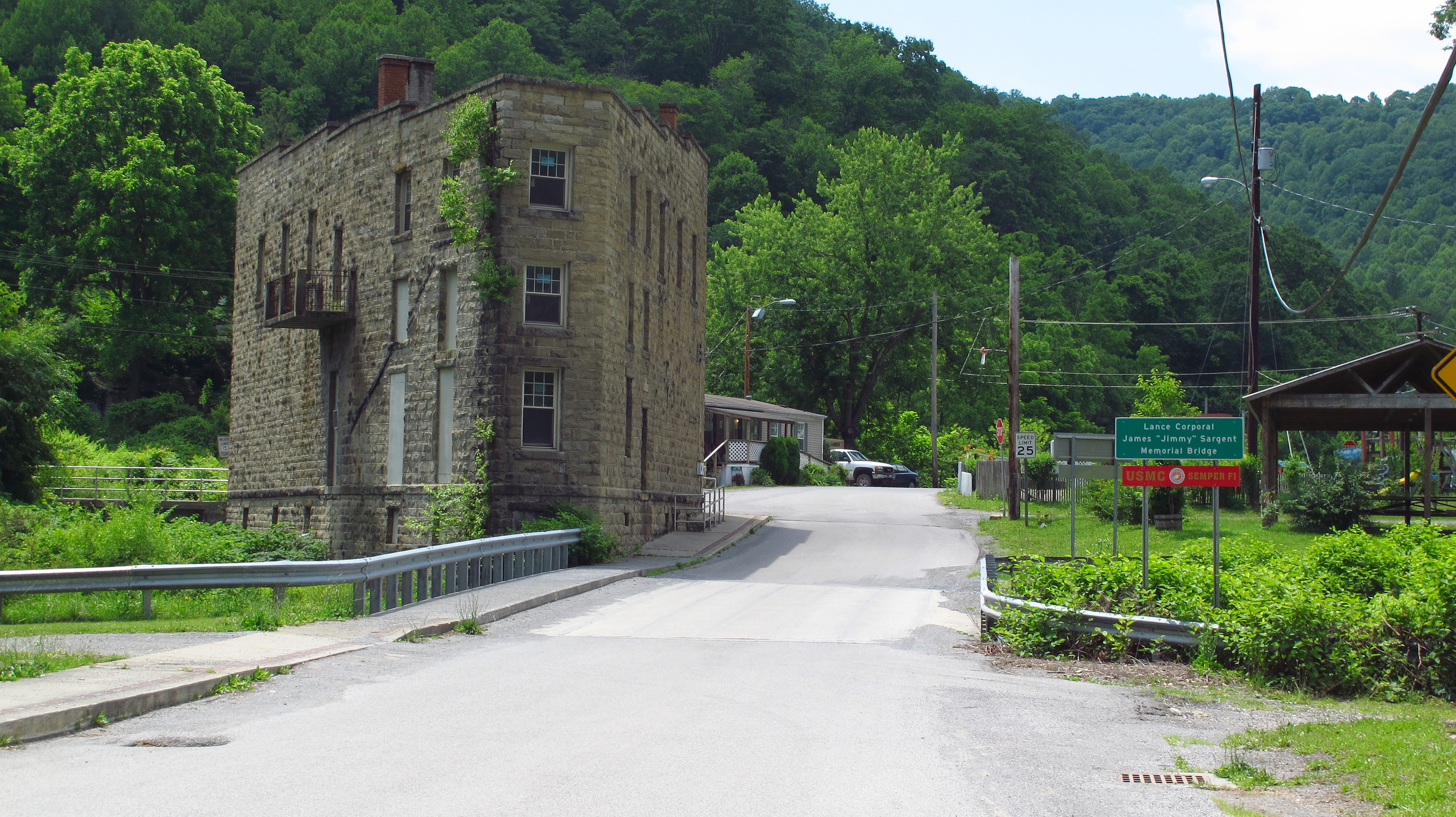
- Jenkinjones Road in Anawalt

- Location of Anawalt in McDowell County, West Virginia.

- Location within West Virginia Location within the United States
- Coordinates: 37°20′11″N 81°26′26″W
- Country: United States
- State: West Virginia
- County: McDowell
- Incorporated: 1949

Area
  - Total: 0.58 sq mi (1.49 km^{2})
  - Land: 0.58 sq mi (1.49 km^{2})
  - Water: 0 sq mi (0.00 km^{2})
- Elevation: 1,680 ft (510 m)

Population (2020)
  - Total: 165
  - Estimate (2021): 179
  - Density: 311.1/sq mi (120.12/km^{2})
- Time zone: UTC-5 (Eastern (EST))
  - Summer (DST): UTC-4 (EDT)
- ZIP code: 24808
- Area code: 304
- FIPS code: 54-01780
- GNIS feature ID: 2390703

Anawalt is a town in McDowell County, West Virginia, United States. At one time it was known as Jeanette. It is named in honor of James White Anawalt, who was then manager of Union Supply Company, a subsidiary of the United States Steel Company. The population was 186 at the 2020 census. Coal mining was the town's chief industry. Anawalt was incorporated in 1949.

== Geography ==
According to the United States Census Bureau, the town has a total area of 0.57 square miles (1.48 km^{2}), all land.

== Demographics ==
Historical population
Census	Pop.	Note	%±
1950	1,383		—
1960	1,062		−23.2%
1970	801		−24.6%
1980	652		−18.6%
1990	329		−49.5%
2000	272		−17.3%
2010	226		−16.9%
2020	165		−27.0%
2021 (est.)	179	▲	8.5%
U.S. Decennial Census; 2015 Estimate

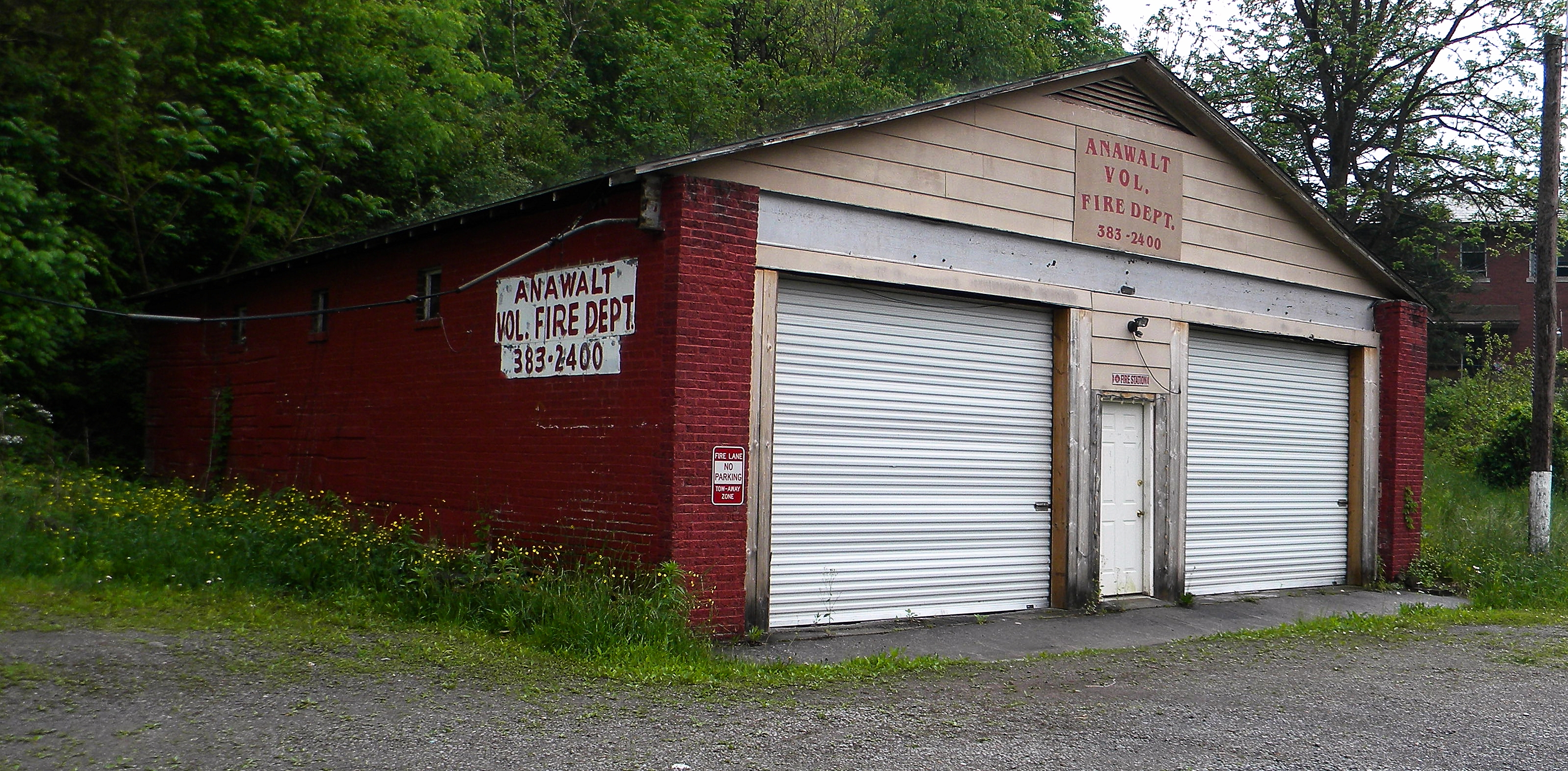
Anawalt Volunteer Fire Department

=== 2010 census ===
At the 2010 census there were 226 people, 91 households, and 62 families living in the town. The population density was 396.5 inhabitants per square mile (153.1/km^{2}). There were 135 housing units at an average density of 236.8 per square mile (91.4/km^{2}). The racial makeup of the town was 88.9% White, 9.3% African American, and 1.8% from two or more races. Hispanic or Latino of any race were 0.4%.

Of the 91 households 31.9% had children under the age of 18 living with them, 41.8% were married couples living together, 19.8% had a female householder with no husband present, 6.6% had a male householder with no wife present, and 31.9% were non-families. 29.7% of households were one person and 15.4% were one person aged 65 or older. The average household size was 2.48 and the average family size was 2.97.

The median age in the town was 44.3 years. 20.4% of residents were under the age of 18; 8.9% were between the ages of 18 and 24; 23% were from 25 to 44; 32.4% were from 45 to 64; and 15.5% were 65 or older. The gender makeup of the town was 47.8% male and 52.2% female.

=== 2000 census ===
At the 2000 census there were 272 people, 114 households, and 77 families living in the town. The population density was 418.4 inhabitants per square mile (161.5/km^{2}). There were 148 housing units at an average density of 227.7 per square mile (87.9/km^{2}). The racial makeup of the town was 90.44% White, 9.19% African American, and 0.37% from two or more races. Of the 114 households 25.4% had children under the age of 18 living with them, 50.0% were married couples living together, 12.3% had a female householder with no husband present, and 31.6% were non-families. 28.9% of households were one person and 18.4% were one person aged 65 or older. The average household size was 2.39 and the average family size was 2.91.

The age distribution was 21.0% under the age of 18, 7.4% from 18 to 24, 28.7% from 25 to 44, 26.8% from 45 to 64, and 16.2% 65 or older. The median age was 42 years. For every 100 females, there were 83.8 males. For every 100 females age 18 and over, there were 83.8 males.

The median household income was $13,333 and the median family income was $17,321. Males had a median income of $30,938 versus $14,375 for females. The per capita income for the town was $8,953. About 37.3% of families and 37.0% of the population were below the poverty line, including 35.6% of those under the age of eighteen and 28.3% of those sixty five or over.

== Notable people ==
- Ed Setrakian, actor, born 1928
