= Welch, West Virginia =

- City
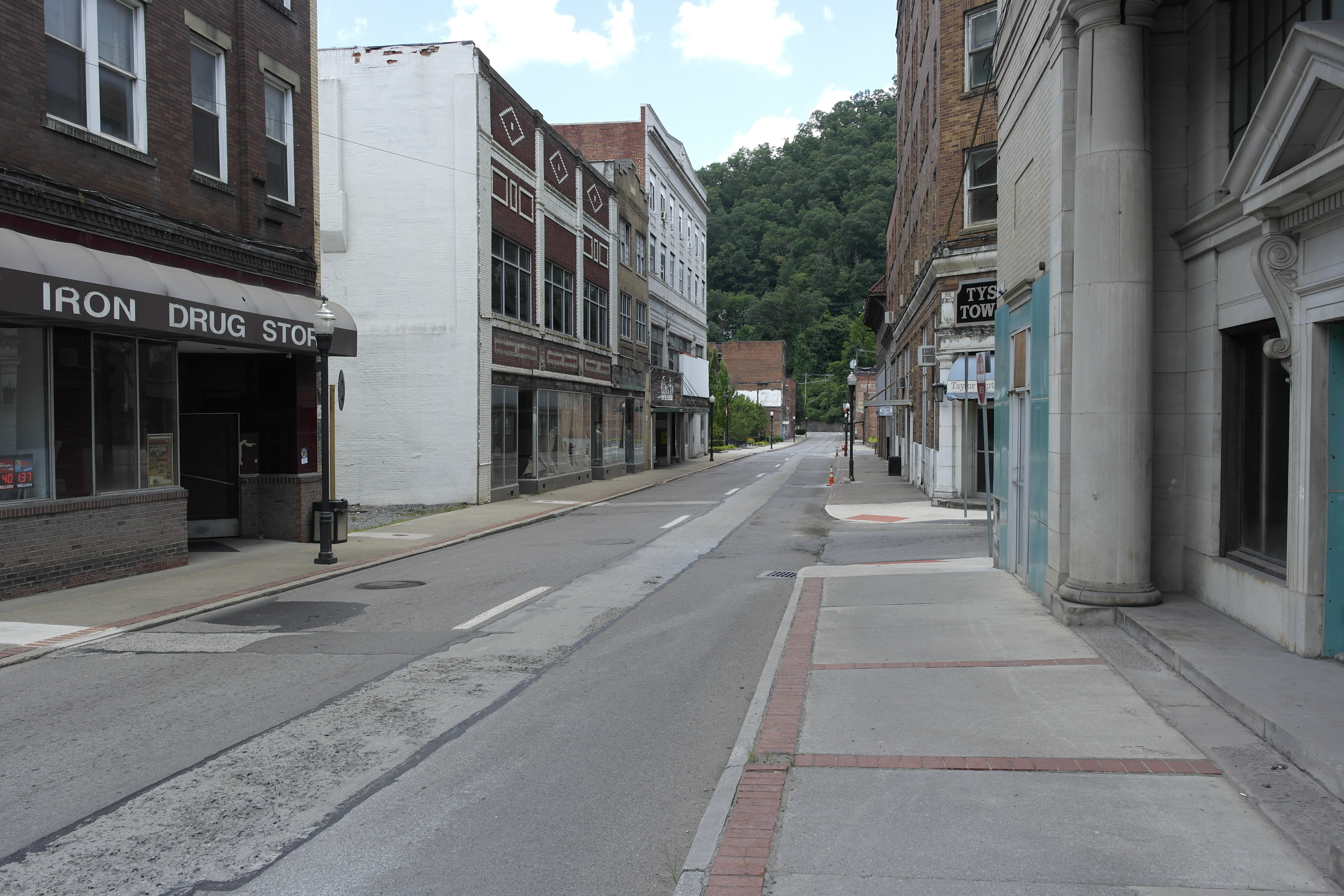
- Facing north on McDowell Street in 2019

- Flag Logo
- Interactive map of Welch, West Virginia
- Location within West Virginia Location within the United States
- Coordinates: 37°26′14″N 81°34′44″W
- Country: United States
- State: West Virginia
- County: McDowell
- Incorporated: 1894

Area
  - Total: 6.07 sq mi (15.71 km^{2})
  - Land: 6.04 sq mi (15.64 km^{2})
  - Water: 0.031 sq mi (0.08 km^{2})
- Elevation: 1,322 ft (403 m)

Population (2020)
  - Total: 3,590
  - Estimate (2024): 3,413
  - Density: 594/sq mi (229.5/km^{2})
- Time zone: UTC−5 (EST)
  - Summer (DST): UTC−4 (EDT)
- ZIP Code: 24801
- Area code: 304
- FIPS code: 54-85228
- GNIS feature ID: 1555936
- Website: www.cityofwelch.com

Welch is a city in and the county seat of McDowell County, West Virginia, United States. The population was 3,590 at the 2020 census. Welch was incorporated as a city in 1894.

== History ==
Welch was incorporated in 1894 and named after Isaiah A. Welch, a former captain in the Confederate States Army who came to the region as a surveyor and helped establish the plan for the beginning of a new town at the confluence of Tug Fork and Elkhorn Creek.

Welch was made the county seat of McDowell County in an election by county citizens in 1892 even before Welch was incorporated as a city. The previous county seat was in Perryville (now English) on present-day West Virginia Route 83 along the Dry Fork. Results of the election were contested, so to avoid violence county records were secretly moved from Perryville to Welch at night in two wagons by James F. Strother and Trigg Tabor.

On March 2, 1921, the Welch City Council met to discuss impeachment of then Mayor J. H. Whitt. Whitt showed up at the meeting and disrupted the proceedings. The Welch City Council then asked the McDowell County Sheriff's Department to investigate Whitt. Later that same day, Mayor Whitt shot and killed McDowell County Deputy Sheriff William Johnson Tabor who was investigating the matter. Mayor Whitt was arrested and charged with murder but won acquittal at his trial (allegedly based on perjured testimony). Whitt left the area for parts unknown on September 27, 1921.

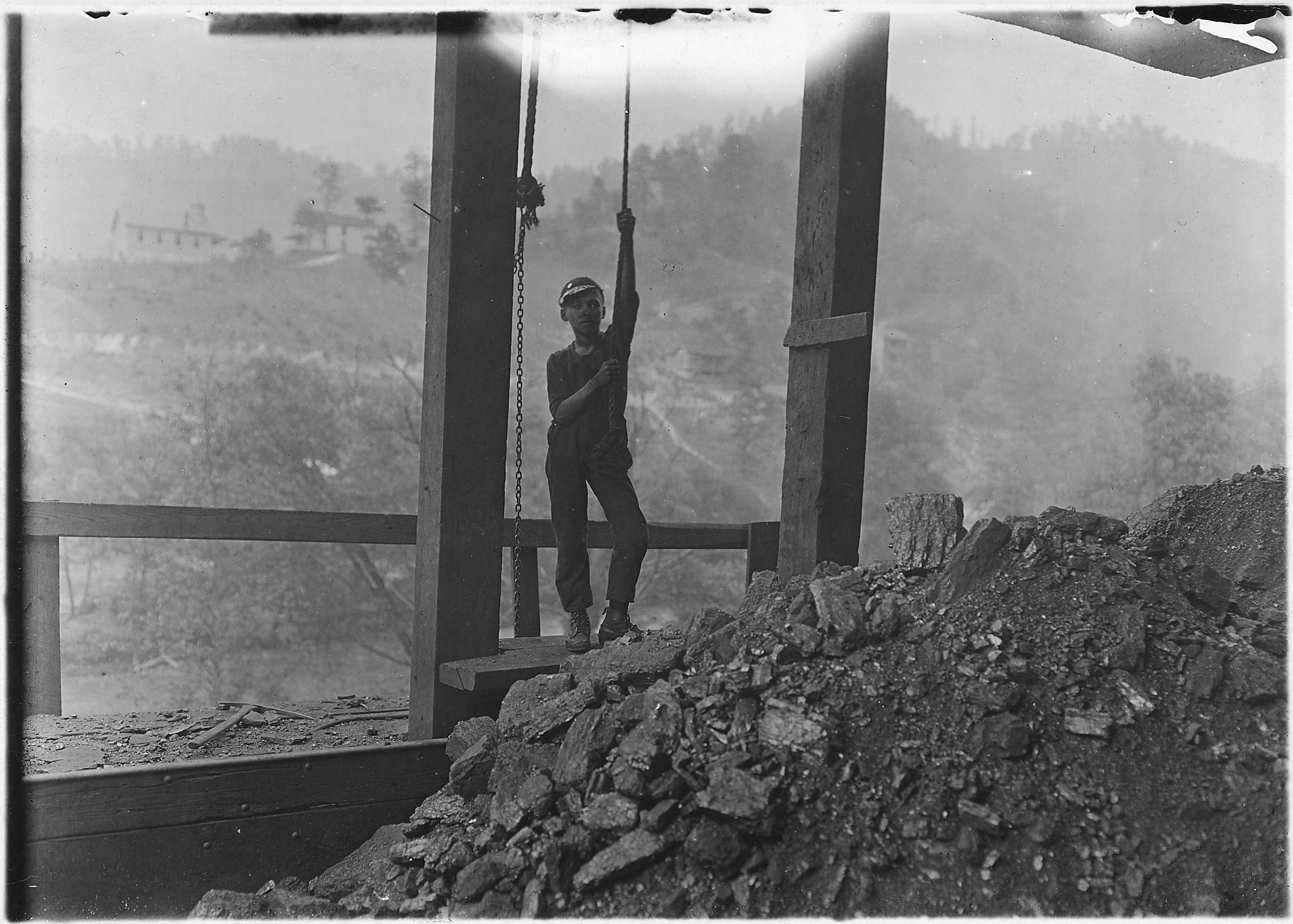
Child laborer at Welch Mining Company, 1908. Photo by Lewis Hine

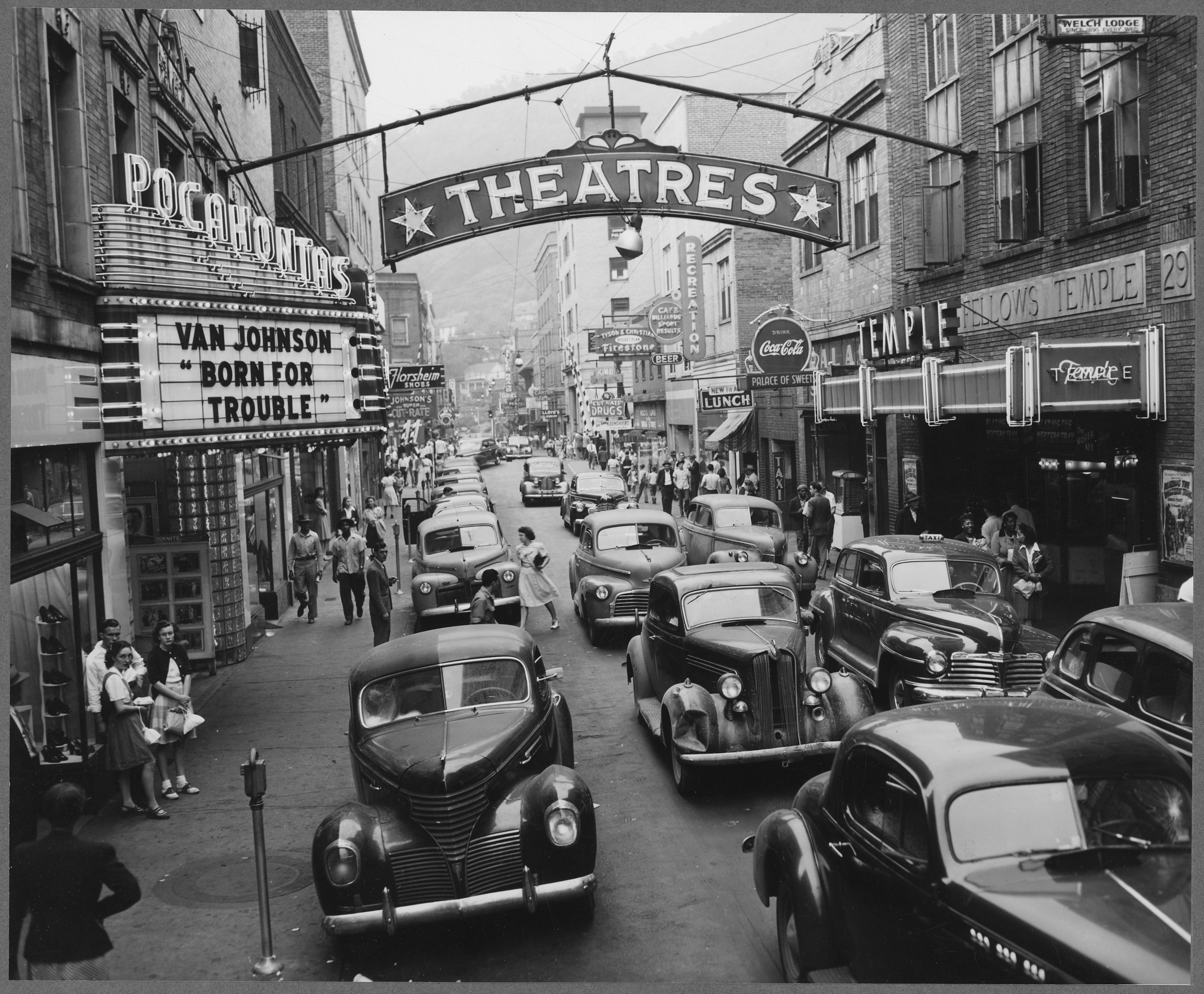
Facing north on McDowell Street in Welch, on a Saturday afternoon in 1946

On August 1, 1921, detectives from the Baldwin–Felts Detective Agency assassinated Matewan Police Chief Sid Hatfield as well as Ed Chambers at the McDowell County Courthouse located in Welch.

In the first half of the 20th century during the opening of railroads and coal mines throughout the region, Welch became a prosperous city: the hub of retail business for a county approaching 100,000 in population, and the location for three hospitals. After the production boom of World War II, oil began to supplant coal in many areas of domestic fuel supply. Mechanization of coal mining reduced the number of laborers needed in coal production. McDowell County's population peaked in 1950, and began a decline over decades to follow. In 1960, however, McDowell County still ranked number one in the United States in total coal production. The City of Welch proudly proclaimed itself "The Heart of the Nation's Coal Bin".

When presidential candidate John F. Kennedy visited Welch by automobile caravan in 1960, he saw a city whose businesses were struggling due to a growing poverty rate throughout the county. What Kennedy learned here during his campaign for the 1960 West Virginia primary was believed to be the basis of the aid brought to the Appalachian region by the Kennedy and Lyndon Johnson administrations. During a speech in Canton, Ohio on September 27, 1960, he stated "McDowell County mines more coal than it ever has in its history, probably more coal than any county in the United States and yet there are more people getting surplus food packages in McDowell County than any county in the United States. The reason is that machines are doing the jobs of men, and we have not been able to find jobs for those men."

The first recipients of modern era food stamps were the Chloe and Alderson Muncy family of Paynesville, McDowell County. Their household included fifteen persons. On May 29, 1961, in the City of Welch, as a crowd of reporters witnessed the proceedings, Secretary of Agriculture Orville Freeman delivered $95 of federal food stamps to Mr. and Mrs. Muncy. This was the first issuance of federal food stamps under the Kennedy Administration, and it was the beginning of a rapidly expanding program of federal assistance that would be legislated in the War on Poverty.

In the 1960s and 1970s, McDowell County coal continued to be a major source of fuel for the steel and electric power generation industries. As United States steel production declined, however, McDowell County suffered further losses. In 1986, the closure of the US Steel mines in nearby Gary led to an immediate loss of more than 1,200 jobs. In the following year alone, personal income in McDowell County decreased dramatically by two-thirds. Real estate values also plummeted. Miners were forced to abandon their homes in search for new beginnings in other regions of the country.

In 2006, the city received national attention when it, along with Police Chief Robert K. Bowman were the defendants in a lawsuit brought by the ACLU after Bowman allegedly prevented rescuers from providing CPR to a gay man suffering cardiac arrest. After the wrongful death claim was allowed to proceed, the lawsuit was settled for an undetermined amount.

Welch has been the celebrated location of an annual Veterans Day Parade that, over the decades, has attracted a distinguished list of speakers, including Presidents Harry S. Truman and Lyndon B. Johnson.

The McDowell County Courthouse and Welch Commercial Historic District are listed on the National Register of Historic Places.

=== Firsts ===
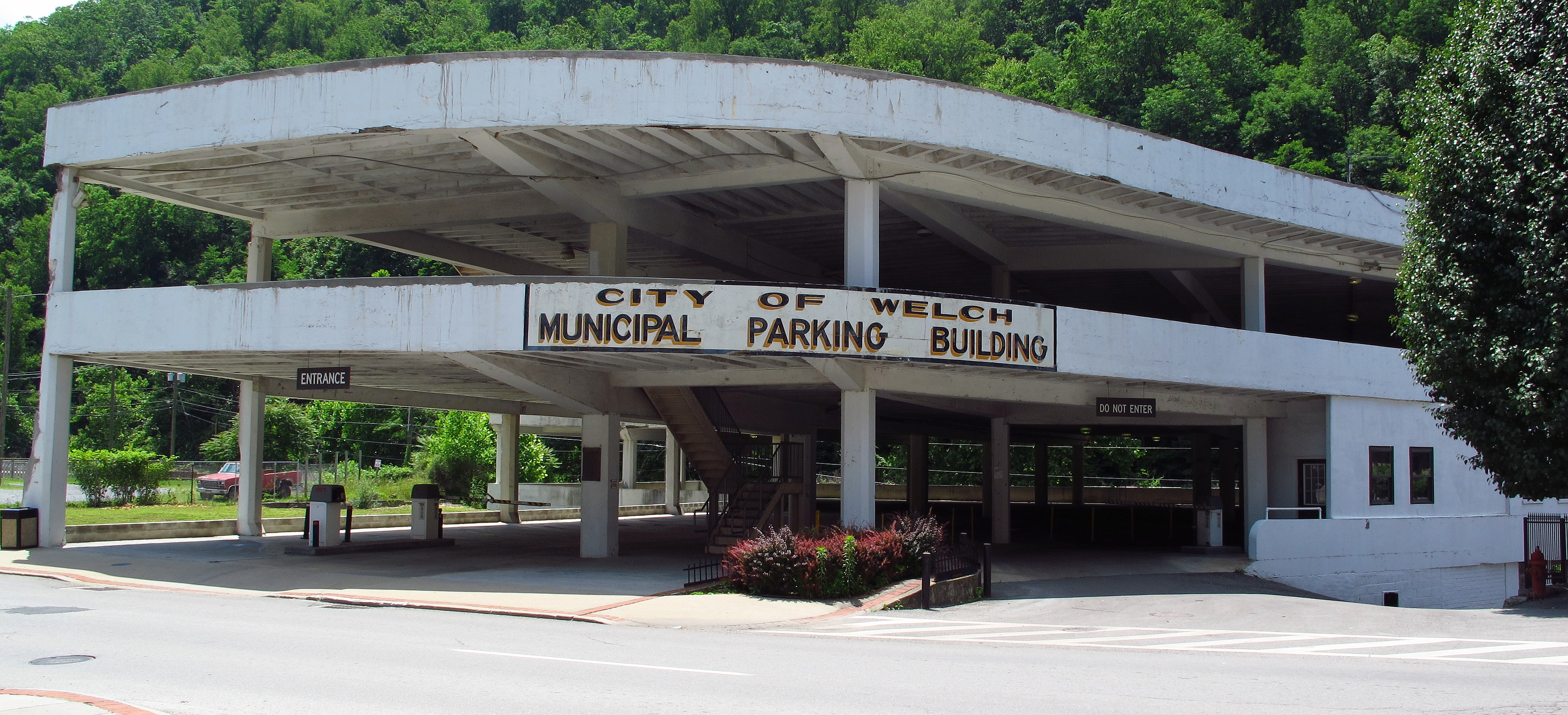
Municipal parking building in Welch

The first public children's playground in West Virginia was built in Welch in 1913. It was constructed using private donations and after 1918 was maintained by the Young Women's Missionary Society of the Methodist Church. The playground sat across the street from the McDowell County Courthouse until 1930 when it became the site for the United States Post Office.

Welch also built the first municipally owned parking building in the United States, which opened on September 1, 1941. It accommodated 232 cars and showed a profit its first year in operation.

== Geography ==
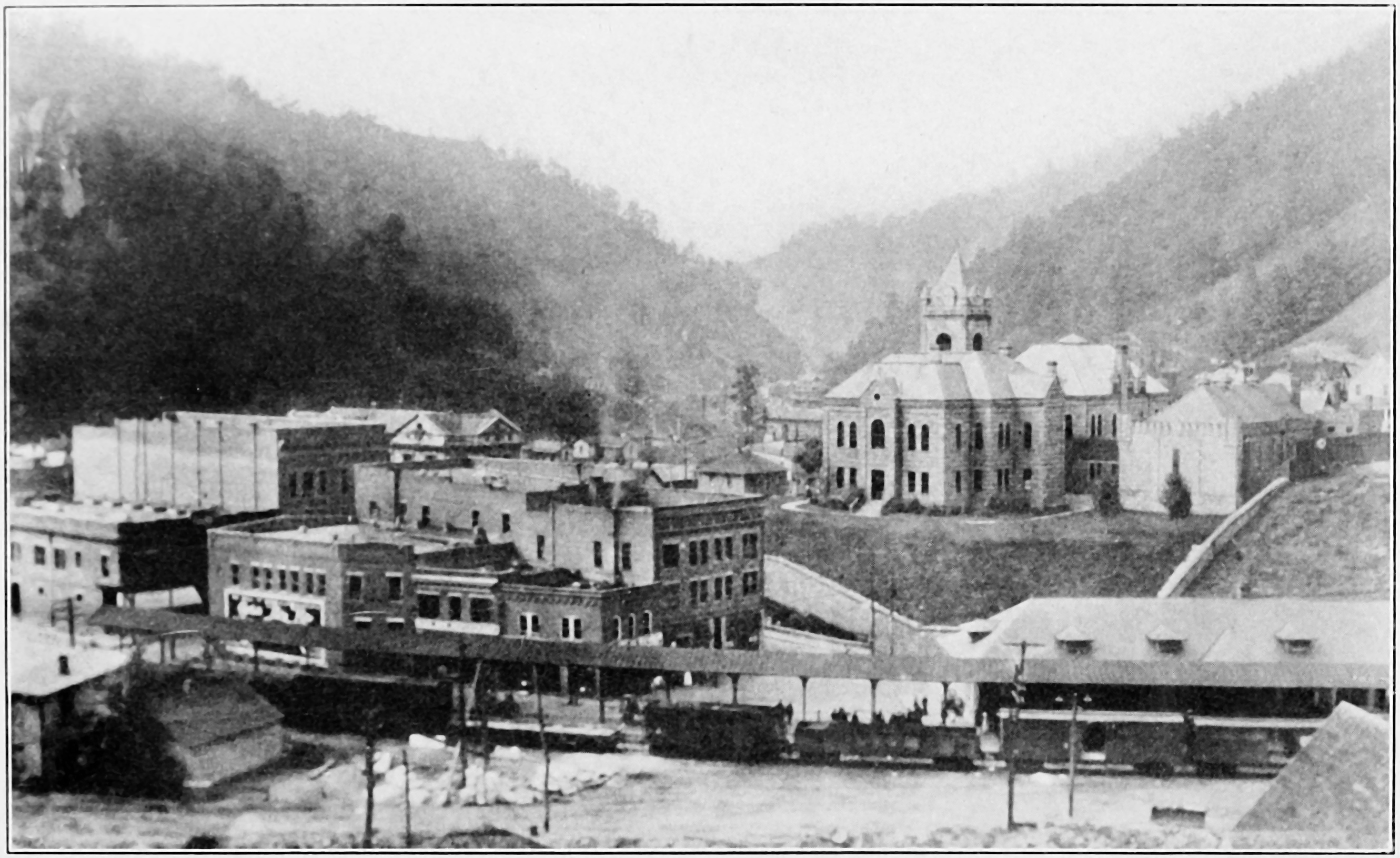
Downtown Welch in 1915

According to the United States Census Bureau, the city has a total area of 6.04 square miles (15.64 km^{2}), of which 6.01 square miles (15.57 km^{2}) is land and 0.03 square miles (0.08 km^{2}) is water.

Periodic flooding of the Elkhorn and Tug Fork rivers has plagued the future prosperity of the city. Most notably, the record flooding in 2001 and 2002 nearly destroyed Welch altogether. Flood reduction projects to prevent further destruction in the future are presently in progress.

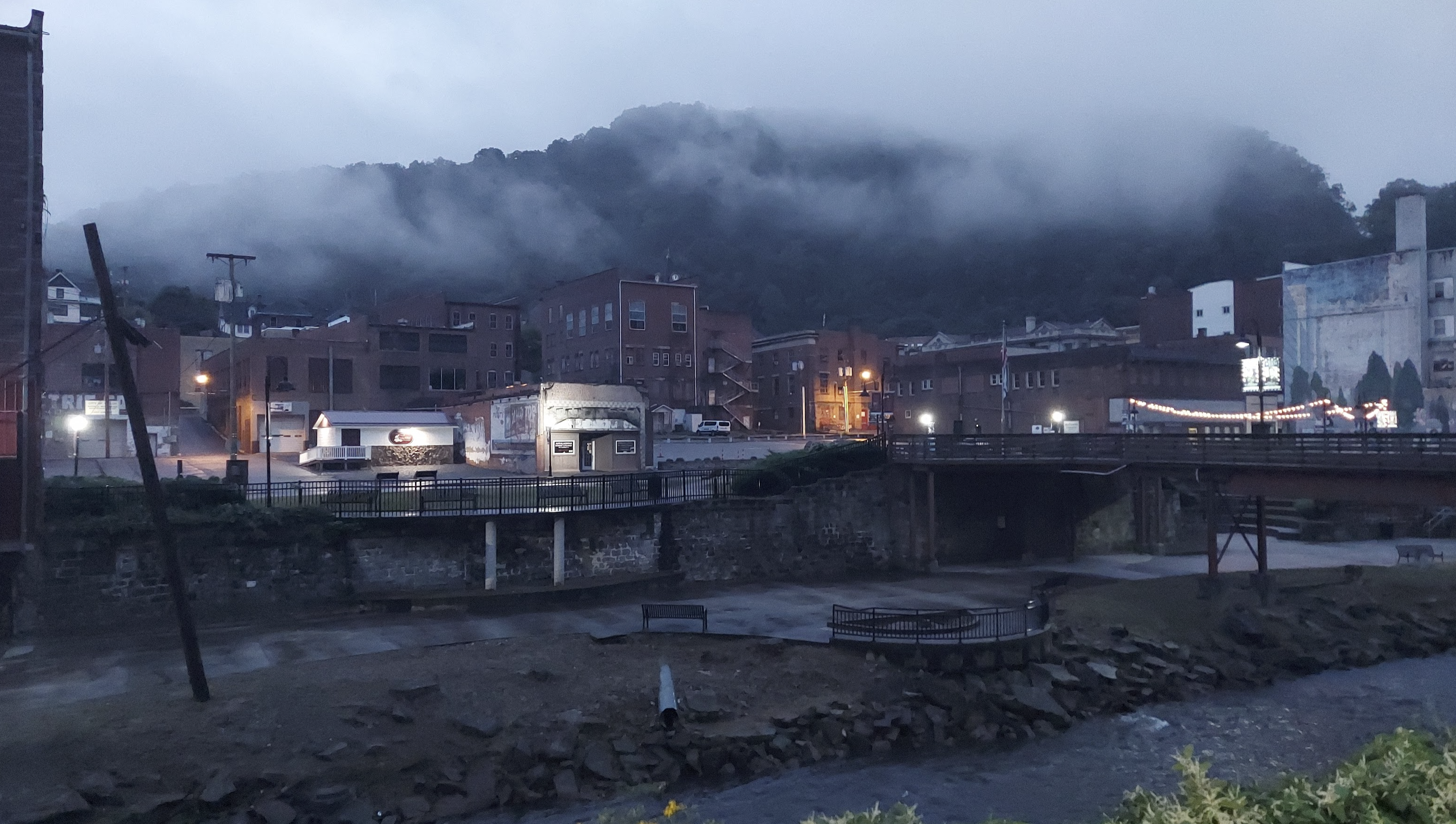
Welch on an overcast morning in September 2023. Due to the local climate and topography, fog shrouding the hilltops is a common sight in the mornings.

The town has a railway station on the Norfolk Southern Railway (former Norfolk and Western) network.

== Demographics ==
Historical population
Census	Pop.	Note	%±
1900	442		—
1910	1,525		245.0%
1920	3,232		111.9%
1930	5,376		66.3%
1940	6,264		16.5%
1950	6,603		5.4%
1960	5,313		−19.5%
1970	4,149		−21.9%
1980	3,885		−6.4%
1990	3,028		−22.1%
2000	2,683		−11.4%
2010	2,406		−10.3%
2020	3,590		49.2%
2023 (est.)	3,414		−4.9%
U.S. Decennial Census; 2020 Census

=== 2020 census ===
As of the 2020 census, Welch had a population of 3,590, with 797 households and 517 families. The median age was 39.2 years; 9.2% of residents were under the age of 18, and 10.0% were 65 years of age or older. For every 100 females there were 290.6 males, and for every 100 females age 18 and over there were 334.5 males age 18 and over.

0.0% of residents lived in urban areas, while 100.0% lived in rural areas.

There were 797 households, of which 22.8% had children under the age of 18 living in them. Of all households, 35.8% were married-couple households, 21.3% were households with a male householder and no spouse or partner present, and 36.6% were households with a female householder and no spouse or partner present. About 39.6% of all households were made up of individuals, and 15.0% had someone living alone who was 65 years of age or older.

There were 1,056 housing units, of which 24.5% were vacant. The homeowner vacancy rate was 2.4% and the rental vacancy rate was 17.0%.

Racial composition as of the 2020 census
Race	Number	Percent
White	2,428	67.6%
Black or African American	1,033	28.8%
American Indian and Alaska Native	9	0.3%
Asian	9	0.3%
Native Hawaiian and Other Pacific Islander	0	0.0%
Some other race	25	0.7%
Two or more races	86	2.4%
Hispanic or Latino (of any race)	325	9.1%

=== 2010 census ===
As of the census of 2010, there were 2,406 people, 984 households, and 554 families living in the city. The population density was 400.3 inhabitants per square mile (154.6/km^{2}). There were 1,265 housing units at an average density of 210.5 per square mile (81.3/km^{2}). The racial makeup of the city was 84.5% White, 13.3% African American, 0.1% Native American, 0.1% Asian, and 2.0% from two or more races. Hispanic or Latino of any race were 0.7% of the population.

There were 984 households, of which 22.4% had children under the age of 18 living with them, 38.7% were married couples living together, 13.2% had a female householder with no husband present, 4.4% had a male householder with no wife present, and 43.7% were non-families. 39.3% of all households were made up of individuals, and 17.4% had someone living alone who was 65 years of age or older. The average household size was 2.11 and the average family size was 2.78.

The median age in the city was 44 years. 15.5% of residents were under the age of 18; 7.9% were between the ages of 18 and 24; 27.9% were from 25 to 44; 30.9% were from 45 to 64; and 17.8% were 65 years of age or older. The gender makeup of the city was 53.4% male and 46.6% female.

=== 2000 census ===
As of the census of 2000, there were 2,683 people, 1,195 households, and 714 families living in the city. The population density was 821.1 people per square mile (316.8/km^{2}). There were 1,453 housing units at an average density of 444.7 per square mile (171.6/km^{2}). The racial makeup of the city was 79.20% White, 19.27% African American, 0.26% Native American, 0.30% Asian, 0.34% from other races, and 0.63% from two or more races. Hispanic or Latino of any race were 1.04% of the population.

There were 1,195 households, out of which 22.7% had children under the age of 18 living with them, 39.2% were married couples living together, 17.2% had a female householder with no husband present, and 40.2% were non-families. 37.6% of all households were made up of individuals, and 17.6% had someone living alone who was 65 years of age or older. The average household size was 2.12 and the average family size was 2.76.

In the city, the population was spread out, with 19.3% under the age of 18, 6.6% from 18 to 24, 24.7% from 25 to 44, 26.7% from 45 to 64, and 22.5% who were 65 years of age or older. The median age was 45 years. For every 100 females, there were 81.7 males. For every 100 females age 18 and over, there were 80.0 males.

The median income for a household in the city was $19,795, and the median income for a family was $30,833. Males had a median income of $30,104 versus $23,320 for females. The per capita income for the city was $16,308. About 23.0% of families and 28.9% of the population were below the poverty line, including 45.9% of those under age 18 and 16.7% of those age 65 or over.

== Transportation ==
=== Highways ===
- U.S. Highway 52
- West Virginia Route 16
- West Virginia Route 103

== Media ==
Welch was served by The Welch News, a local newspaper that ran on Monday, Wednesday and Friday, until its sudden closure on March 13, 2023.

== Education ==
Welch High School was a 3-story building located in the town. Ernest C. S. Holmboe's firm designed the 1906 high school building. In 1938, Hassel T. Hicks designed the school's gymnasium. The complex is on a hillside and was built with brown brick. The Browns Creek District High School at the school site has a Temple-of-the-Winds Corinthian portico with entablature reliefs.

The high schools athletics teams were known as the Maroon Wave. Scotty Hamilton was a basketball coach at the school. A barrel trophy was awarded to the winner in the annual Gary High School and Welch High School football game.

The football team won a 1928 Southern Interscholastic Athletic Association championship. The school was white only until integration in 1957, In 1963 the football team went undefeated. Tony Colobro was its coach.

== Notable people ==
- Steve Harvey - Comedian, radio and television host (born 1957)
- Jeannette Walls – American writer and journalist (born 1960)

== See also ==
- McDowell County Schools – School district in West Virginia
