= Pocahontas Coalfield =

Coalfield in Virginia, U.S.

Coordinates: 37°18′N 81°20′W

Geographical boundary of the Pocahontas Coalfield (in pink) comprising Tazewell County Virginia, McDowell County West Virginia and Mercer County West Virginia

Pocahontas Coalfield, which is also known as the Flat Top-Pocahontas Coalfield, is located in Mercer County/McDowell County, West Virginia and Tazewell County, Virginia. The earliest mining of coal in the coalfield was in Pocahontas, Virginia in 1883 at Pocahontas Mine No. 1, now on the National Register of Historic Places.

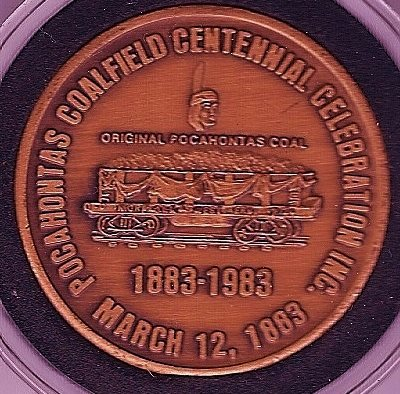
Pocahontas Coalfield Centennial Celebration medal

The coal seams—Pocahontas No. 3, No. 4, No. 6, and No. 11—are some of the best coal to be found in the world, and are rated at 15,000 Btu/lb (35 MJ/kg).

This operation, replete with beehive coke ovens, eventually spawned the Pocahontas Fuel Company, which operated mines in Virginia at Boissevain and Amonate, and in West Virginia at Jenkinjones, Bishop, and Itmann.

== History ==
Later Pocahontas Fuel Company (formerly Pocahontas Consolidated) was absorbed into Consolidation Coal Company, which still mines coal at Amonate.

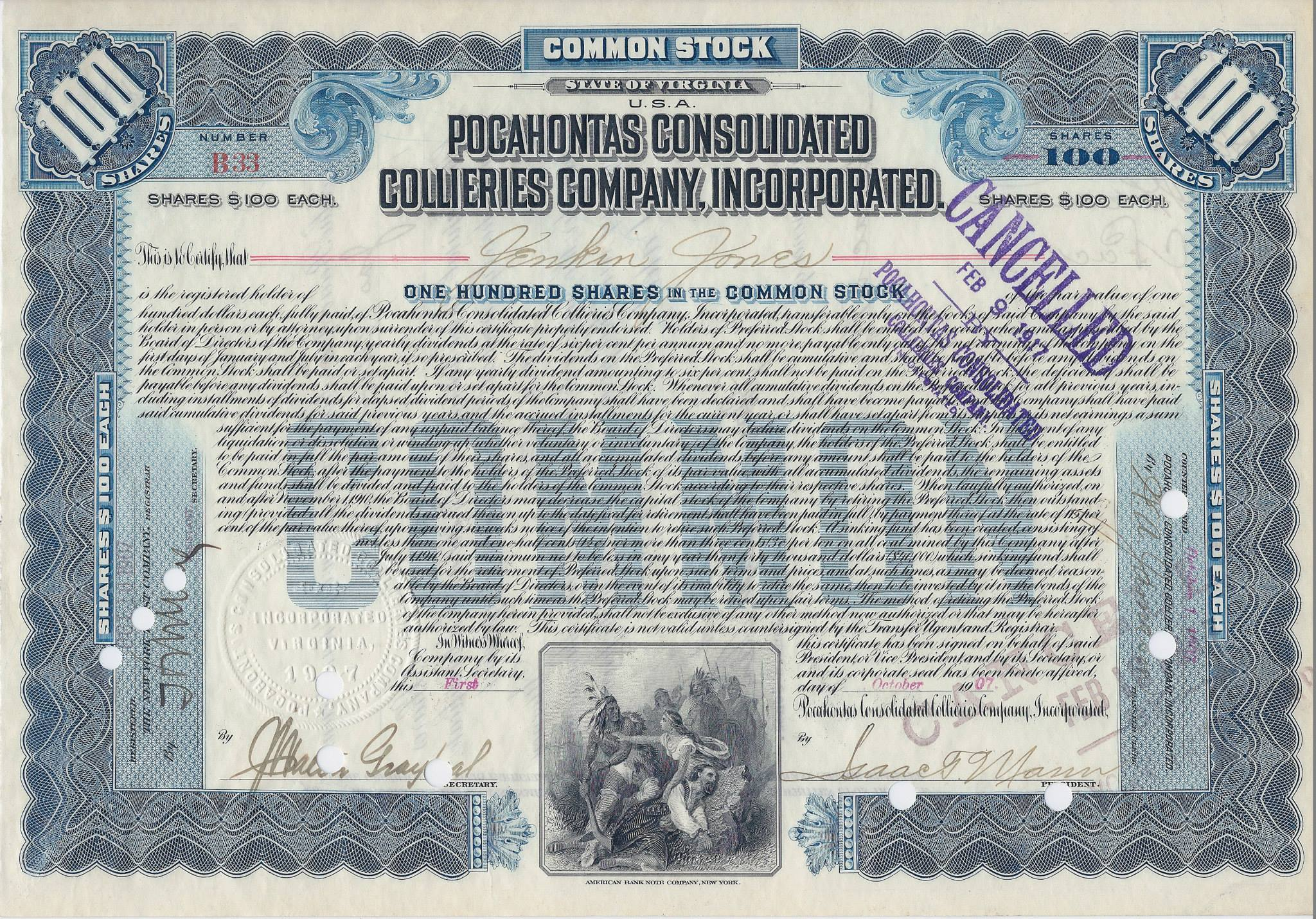
1907 Pocahontas Consolidated Stock Certificate

The mines at Pocahontas were able to ship coal when the Norfolk & Western Railway bought the New River Railroad and extended a branch line there. As this railroad was extended westward through Mercer and McDowell Counties the coalfield expanded with it. By the mid-1880s the Bramwell area was booming with mines at Coopers and Freeman.

Coal mines continued to open through the 1890s as the Norfolk & Western Railroad laid track along Elkhorn Creek and eventually reached Welch. Some of these coal mines/coal camps included Maybeury, Elkhorn, Upland, and Keystone.

The coals of the Pocahontas coalfield developed a good reputation, and by 1903, U.S. Steel had set up a subsidiary named U.S. Coal and Coke to mine coal in central McDowell County. The operations centered around Gary, with numbered coal mines/camps surrounding the central coal town of Gary like coal town suburbs. Wilcoe was Gary No. 1, Ream was Gary No. 6, Elbert was Gary No.8, and Venus was Gary No. 10 and Thorpe was No.11. At first the coal was baked in beehive coke ovens at the mine site and shipped to the steel mills as coke (much as U.S. Steel had done in the Connellsville coalfield in Pennsylvania). After 1918 the coal was shipped by rail to the massive Coke Works in Clairton. The captive mines of U.S. Steel in the Gary area continued to thrive until the 1980s, when they were closed and Gary began an economic decline.

The Pocahontas Coalfield continued to thrive through two world wars. The United Mine Workers union gained a foothold in the coalfield after the 1930s. African Americans from the south flooded the coalfield in search of a better way of life, and to this day McDowell County has the highest percentage of African-American population of any West Virginia county. Immigrants from Poland, Hungary, Italy, and Greece settled in the coal camps and contributed to the remarkable ethnic diversity of the area. Echoes of this diversity are still evident today.

In the mid–20th century mines thrived at Capels, Caretta, Coalwood, and Berwind. On January 10, 1940, the Bartley No. 1 Mine explosion killed 91 miners, and subsequently, Havaco No. 9 mine explosion on January 15, 1956 claimed the lives of 15 coal miners.

Extraction of the low-volatile coal continued unabated through the energy boom of the late 1970s and early 1980s. Since 1990 this coalfield has been on the decline and outmigration has robbed the area of 75% of its population. (In 1950 McDowell County had a population of approximately 100,000 people, which was reduced to about 22,000 people in the 2010 census.) Yet today there are a few medium to small surface and deep mines still operating.

== Coal camps ==
Some of the names of the coal camps, also called coal towns, associated with the Pocahontas Coalfield are:

- Algoma
- Amonate
- Anawalt
- Bartley
- Berwind
- Big Four
- Bishop
- Boissevain
- Bramwell
- Capels
- Caretta
- Coalwood
- Coopers
- Cucumber
- Eight
- Elbert
- Elkhorn
- English
- Freeman
- Gary
- Havaco
- Jenkinjones
- Keystone
- Maybeury
- Pageton
- Pocahontas
- Premier
- Ream
- Six
- Thorpe
- Upland
- Venus
- Vivian
- War
- Welch
- Wilcoe

== See also ==
- Coalfield
- Pocahontas, Alberta
- New River Coalfield
- Winding Gulf Coalfield
