= National Register of Historic Places listings in McDowell County, West Virginia =

Location of McDowell County in West Virginia

This is a list of the National Register of Historic Places listings in McDowell County, West Virginia.

This is intended to be a complete list of the properties and districts on the National Register of Historic Places in McDowell County, West Virginia, United States. The locations of National Register properties and districts for which the latitude and longitude coordinates are included below, may be seen in an online map.

There are 18 properties and districts listed on the National Register in the county. Most of these locations are the former company stores of coal companies.

This National Park Service list is complete through NPS recent listings posted January 2, 2026.

Contents: Counties in West Virginia

Barbour - Berkeley - Boone - Braxton - Brooke - Cabell - Calhoun - Clay - Doddridge - Fayette - Gilmer - Grant - Greenbrier - Hampshire - Hancock - Hardy - Harrison - Jackson - Jefferson - Kanawha - Lewis - Lincoln - Logan - Marion - Marshall - Mason - McDowell - Mercer - Mineral - Mingo - Monongalia - Monroe - Morgan - Nicholas - Ohio - Pendleton - Pleasants - Pocahontas - Preston - Putnam - Raleigh - Randolph - Ritchie - Roane - Summers - Taylor - Tucker - Tyler - Upshur - Wayne - Webster - Wetzel - Wirt - Wood - Wyoming

== Current listings ==
	Name on the Register	Image	Date listed	Location	City or town	Description
1	Algoma Coal and Coke Company Store	Algoma Coal and Coke Company Store	April 17, 1992 (#92000323)	County Route 17; 37°25′10″N 81°25′35″W	Algoma	
2	Ashland Company Store	Ashland Company Store	May 5, 2005 (#05000399)	County Route 17; 37°24′33″N 81°21′14″W	Ashland	
3	Carter Coal Company Store	Carter Coal Company Store	April 17, 1992 (#92000329)	Junction of WV 16 and County Route 12/8; 37°20′01″N 81°40′28″W	Caretta	
4	Carter Coal Company Store	Carter Coal Company Store	April 17, 1992 (#92000328)	County Route 2; 37°23′14″N 81°39′06″W	Coalwood	Demolished March 29, 2008.
5	Henrietta Dismukes Hospital Nurses Home		January 8, 2026 (#100012518)	21 Lavania Street; 37°25′40″N 81°30′22″W	Kimball	
6	Empire Coal Company Store	Empire Coal Company Store	April 17, 1992 (#92000321)	U.S. Route 52; 37°24′43″N 81°28′28″W	Landgraff	No longer extant.
7	Houston Coal Company Store	Houston Coal Company Store	April 17, 1992 (#92000331)	U.S. Route 52; 37°25′48″N 81°30′32″W	Carswell	
8	James Ellwood Jones House	James Ellwood Jones House	April 2, 1992 (#92000306)	North of U.S. Route 52, east of Turkey Gap Branch; 37°22′17″N 81°22′52″W	Switchback	
9	John J. Lincoln House	John J. Lincoln House	July 16, 1992 (#92000900)	North of U.S. Route 52; 37°23′07″N 81°24′46″W	Elkhorn	
10	McDowell County Courthouse	McDowell County Courthouse	August 29, 1979 (#79003256)	Wyoming St. 37°25′57″N 81°35′03″W	Welch	
11	Page Coal and Coke Company Store	Page Coal and Coke Company Store	April 17, 1992 (#92000325)	WV 161; 37°20′57″N 81°27′53″W	Pageton	
12	Peerless Coal Company Store	Peerless Coal Company Store	April 17, 1992 (#92000322)	South of U.S. Route 52; 37°25′03″N 81°29′26″W	Vivian	
13	Pocahontas Fuel Company Store	Pocahontas Fuel Company Store	April 17, 1992 (#92000324)	U.S. Route 52; 37°22′32″N 81°21′48″W	Maybeury	Demolished sometime after March 2005.
14	Pocahontas Fuel Company Store		April 17, 1992 (#92000330)	U.S. Route 52; 37°22′14″N 81°23′04″W	Switchback	
15	Pocahontas Fuel Company Store and Office Buildings	Pocahontas Fuel Company Store and Office Buildings	April 17, 1992 (#92000326)	County Route 8; 37°17′28″N 81°25′25″W	Jenkinjones	
16	U.S. Coal and Coke Company Store	U.S. Coal and Coke Company Store	April 17, 1992 (#92000327)	County Route 13/2; 37°21′05″N 81°32′51″W	Ream	Demolished sometime between March 2004 and 2006.
17	Welch Commercial Historic District	Welch Commercial Historic District	April 2, 1992 (#92000305)	Roughly bounded by Wyoming St., Elkhorn Creek and the Tug River; 37°25′57″N 81°35′08″W	Welch	Boundary increase approved December 14, 2018
18	World War Memorial	World War Memorial	April 9, 1993 (#93000227)	U.S. Route 52; 37°25′31″N 81°30′24″W	Kimball	

== See also ==
- List of National Historic Landmarks in West Virginia
- National Register of Historic Places listings in West Virginia
