= Bramwell Additions Historic District =

Historic district in West Virginia, United States

- U.S. National Register of Historic Places
- U.S. Historic district
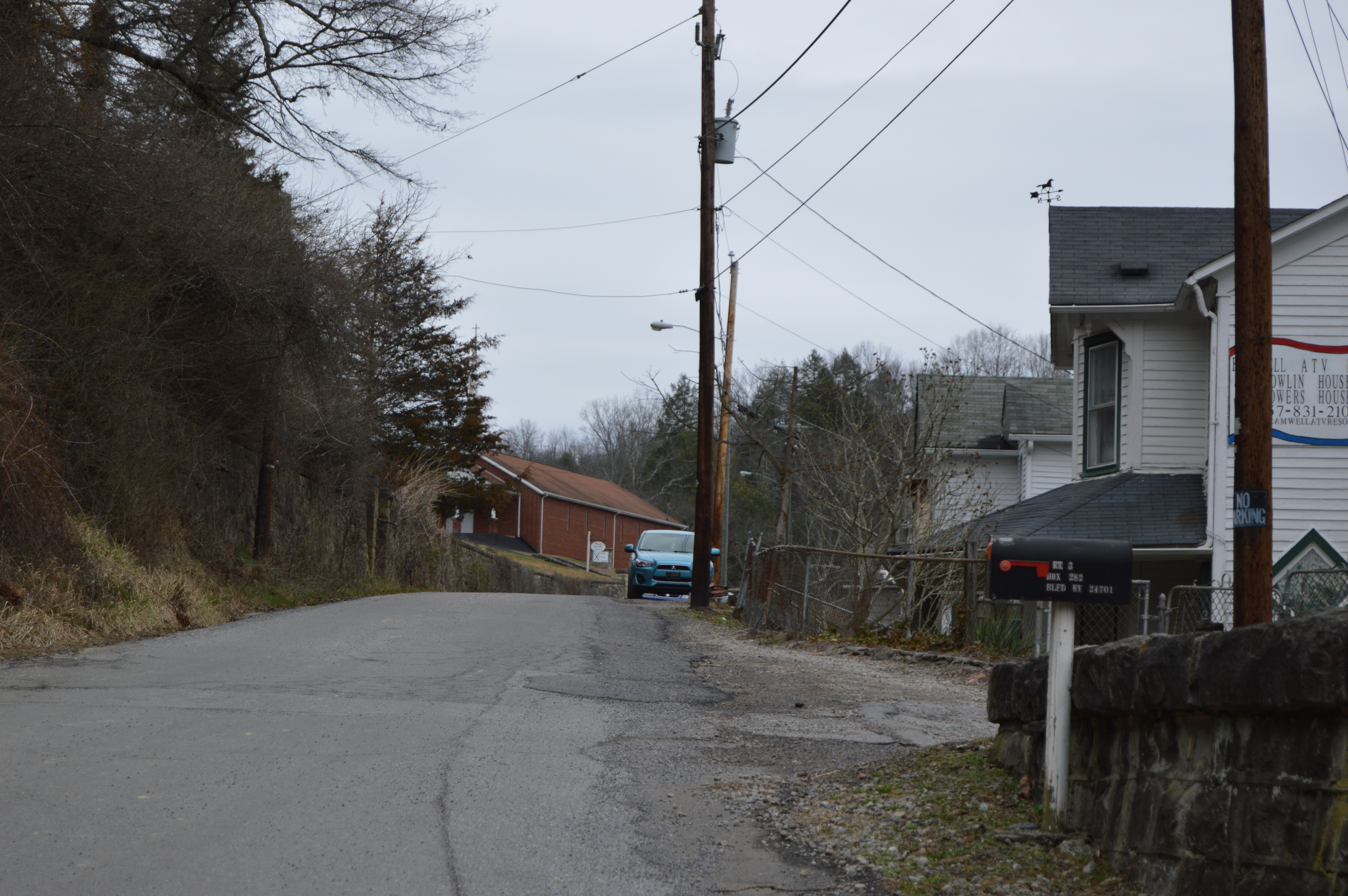
- Simmons Avenue in the district

- Location within West Virginia Location within the United States
- Location: Along Bluestone Ave. SW of US 92, also two discontiguous areas N and W along the Bluestone R.; Parts of Bluestone Ave., Clifton St., Renova St., Simmons Ave., Simmons St. and Spring St., Bramwell, West Virginia
- Coordinates: 37°19′26″N 81°18′35″W
- Area: 133 acres (54 ha) and 12 acres (4.9 ha)
- Built: 1888
- Architectural style: Mid 19th Century Revival, Late Victorian, Late 19th And 20th Century Revivals
- NRHP reference No.: 95000877, 05000400
- Added to NRHP: August 3, 1995; boundary increase May 5, 2005

Bramwell Additions Historic District is a national historic district located at Bramwell, Mercer County, West Virginia. The district originally included 151 contributing buildings, 8 contributing sites, 5 contributing structures, and 2 contributing objects. The boundary increase added 27 contributing buildings and 1 contributing structure. The non-contiguous district encompasses formerly independent coal mining oriented communities now incorporated into Bramwell. These communities include Freeman, Ramey Addition, Simmons, and Coopers. The district is characterized by company houses built as residences for miners.

It was listed on the National Register of Historic Places in 1995. A boundary increase was added in 2005.
