= Pocahontas Fuel Company Store =

Pocahontas Fuel Company Store may refer to:

- Pocahontas Fuel Company Store (Maybeury, West Virginia), listed on the National Register of Historic Places in McDowell County, West Virginia
- Pocahontas Fuel Company Store (Jenkinjones, West Virginia), listed on the National Register of Historic Places in McDowell County, West Virginia
- Pocahontas Fuel Company Store (Switchback, West Virginia), listed on the National Register of Historic Places in McDowell County, West Virginia
