= Fall River Navigation Company =

Former US Transportation and Shipping Company

- House flag
- Industry: transportation and shipping
- Founded: 1927 in Fall River, Massachusetts
- Defunct: 1958
- Fate: Merged in to Pocahontas Fuel Company
- Key people: William C. Atwater
- Parent: William C. Atwater & Company

Fall River Navigation Company was shipping company founded in Fall River, Massachusetts, in 1927, as a subsidiary of the William C. Atwater & Company. William C. Atwater & Company was a coal and fuel oil merchant founded on April 15, 1898, by William C. Atwater. The Great Fall River fire of 1928 damaged the Fall River Navigation Company building. Fall River Navigation Company was active in supporting the World War II effort. William C. Atwater & Company merged into the Pocahontas Fuel Company in 1958.

== William C. Atwater ==
William C. Atwater was born on July 4, 1861, and graduated from Amherst College in 1884. He Became a selling agent for coal from the Pocahontas Coalfield of West Virginia, which did very well during World War I. William C. Atwater & Company also operated the subsidiary Atwcoal Transportation Company from 1935 to 1950, delivering coal on barges. In 1950 Atwcoal Transportation Company became the American Coastal Line. From 1922 to about 1934 he was active in the Pocahontas Producers Association. William C. Atwater's sons: William C. Atwater and Jr., John J. Atwater became active and took over the firm after his death on February 22, 1940.

== World War II ==
Fall River Navigation Company fleet of ships were used to help the World War II effort. During World War II Fall River Navigation Company operated Merchant navy ships for the United States Shipping Board. During World War II Fall River Navigation Company was active with charter shipping with the Maritime Commission and War Shipping Administration. Fall River Navigation Company operated Liberty ships for the merchant navy. The ship was run by its Fall River Navigation Company crew and the US Navy supplied United States Navy Armed Guards to man the deck guns and radio.

== Ships ==
Ships owned by Fall River Navigation Company:

Liberty ship of World War II

- William C. Atwater, built at River Rouge MI by Great Lakes Engineering Works sold in 1936 and renamed E. J. Kulas
- Atwater was purchased in 1927, built by the Ecorse yard in 1919 as Coulee, in 1943 taken for war effort for as target practice.
- Yankkee Star was the Galen L. Stone, a Liberty Ship purchased in 1947.
- Yankke Dawn, was the Empire Wandle, operated 1948 and 1949, built in 1935
- Coastal Highflyer was USS Sebastian (AK-211) purchased in 1947, On 29 July 1947, she ran aground at the east end of Cayo Moa, Grand Shoal, Cuba.
  - World War II operated by Fall River Navigation Company (post war work):
  - Liberty Ships:
- Galen L. Stone, operated in 1946, purchased in 1947.
- William H. Wilmer, operated 1946 to 1949,
- Cecil N. Bean, operated in 1946 to 1949

== See also ==
- World War II United States Merchant Navy
