= USS Sebastian =

Cargo ship of the United States Navy

History

United States
- Name: Sebastian
- Namesake: Sebastian County, Arkansas
- Ordered: as type (C1-M-AV1) hull, MC hull 2165
- Builder: Leathem D. Smith Shipbuilding Company, Sturgeon Bay, Wisconsin
- Yard number: 331
- Laid down: 10 August 1944
- Launched: 21 December 1944
- Sponsored by: Miss J.C. Sullivan
- Acquired: 10 August 1945
- Commissioned: 11 September 1945
- Decommissioned: 14 November 1945
- Stricken: 28 November 1945
- Identification: Hull symbol: AK-211; Code letters: NXOE
- Fate: transferred back to MARCOM, 14 November 1945

United States
- Name: Coastal Spartan
- Owner: MARCOM
- Operator: Fall River Navigation Company (1947)
- Acquired: 14 November 1945
- In service: 14 November 1945
- Out of service: 12 May 1948
- Fate: sent to reserve fleet, 18 May 1948; loaned to US Army, 31 October 1966

United States
- Name: Coastal Highflyer (1966–1967); Resolve (1967–)
- Acquired: 31 October 1966
- Renamed: May 1967
- Fate: Sold for scrap, 22 January 1976

General characteristics
- Class & type: Alamosa-class cargo ship
- Type: C1-M-AV1
- Tonnage: 5,032 long tons deadweight (DWT)
- Displacement: 2,382 long tons (2,420 t) (standard); 7,450 long tons (7,570 t) (full load)
- Length: 388 ft 8 in (118.47 m)
- Beam: 50 ft (15 m)
- Draft: 21 ft 1 in (6.43 m)
- Installed power: 1 × Nordberg, TSM 6 diesel engine; 1,750 shp (1,300 kW)
- Propulsion: 1 × propeller
- Speed: 11.5 kn (21.3 km/h; 13.2 mph)
- Capacity: 3,945 t (3,883 long tons) DWT; 9,830 cu ft (278 m^{3}) (refrigerated); 227,730 cu ft (6,449 m^{3}) (non-refrigerated)
- Complement: 15 Officers; 70 Enlisted
- Armament: 1 × 3 in (76 mm)/50 caliber dual purpose gun (DP); 6 × 20 mm (0.8 in) Oerlikon anti-aircraft (AA) cannons

USS Sebastian (AK-211) was an Alamosa-class cargo ship that was constructed for the US Navy during the closing period of World War II. She was retained by the Navy for only a short period of service before being inactivated as "excess to needs."

== Construction ==
Sebastian was laid down on 10 August 1944, under US Maritime Commission (MARCOM) contract, MC hull 2165, by the Leathem D. Smith Shipbuilding Company, Sturgeon Bay, Wisconsin; launched on 21 December 1944; sponsored by Miss J.C. Sullivan; delivered to the U.S. Maritime Commission on 31 January 1945; acquired by the Navy on loan charter on 10 August 1945; converted to an AK at New Orleans, Louisiana; and commissioned on 11 September 1945.

== Service history ==
=== World War II-related service ===
Commissioned after the end of World War II, Sebastian was retained by the Navy only briefly.

=== Post-war inactivation ===
She was decommissioned on 14 November 1945 and simultaneously returned to MARCOM's War Shipping Administration (WSA) for subsequent maritime service under the name Coastal Highflyer. The name Sebastian was struck from the Navy List on 28 November 1945.

== Merchant service ==
On 4 January 1947, the Fall River Navigation Company chartered Coastal Highflyer. On 29 July 1947, she ran aground at the east end of Cayo Moa, Grand Shoal, Cuba.

She was laid up in the Reserve Fleet in Wilmington, North Carolina, 18 May 1948.

On 2 September 1960, she was put up for sale but received no bids.

== US Army service ==
On 31 October 1966, Coastal Highflyer was loaned to the US Army to serve as a training ship for stevedores. In May 1967 her name was changed to Resolve.

She was sold for scrap on 22 January 1976, to Andy International, Inc.

== Notes ==
Citations

== Bibliography ==
Online resources

- "Sebastian". Dictionary of American Naval Fighting Ships. Naval History and Heritage Command. This article incorporates text from this source, which is in the public domain.
- "C1 Cargo Ships". www.ShipbuildingHistory.com. 28 August 2009.
- "USS Sebastian (AK-211)". NavSource. 24 June 2011.
- "Coastal Highflyer". United States Department of Transportation. Archived from the original on November 4, 2016.
