= Pocahontas Fuel Company Store and Office Buildings =

- U.S. National Register of Historic Places
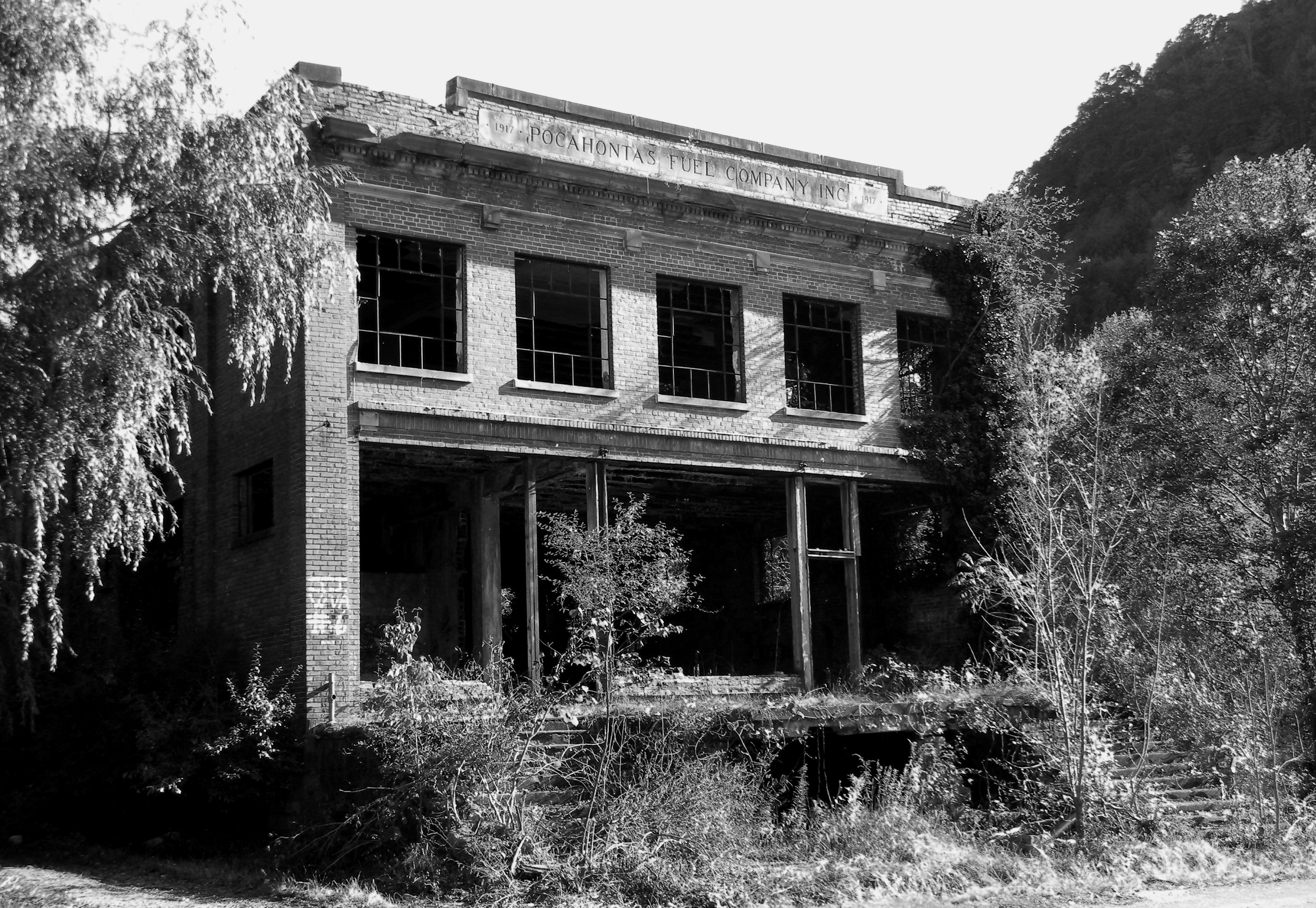
- Pocahontas Fuel Company store, photographed in 2011

- Location within West Virginia Location within the United States
- Location: Co. Rt. 8, Jenkinjones, West Virginia
- Coordinates: 37°17′28″N 81°25′25″W
- Area: 2 acres (0.81 ha)
- Architect: Alex B. Mahood
- Architectural style: Classical Revival
- MPS: Coal Company Stores in McDowell County MPS
- NRHP reference No.: 92000326
- Added to NRHP: April 17, 1992

Pocahontas Fuel Company Store and Office Buildings are a historic company store and an office building located at Jenkinjones, McDowell County, West Virginia. Both buildings were designed by architect Alex B. Mahood and built in 1917. They were listed on the National Register of Historic Places in 1992.

== History ==
Born in Glynneath, Wales, Jenkin B. Jones (1841–1916), the namesake for the coal town of Jenkinjones, West Virginia, founded the Pocahontas Fuel Company after consolidating several coal mining operations in 1907. The two buildings were constructed to be durable and also as a symbol of success within the community.

== Description ==
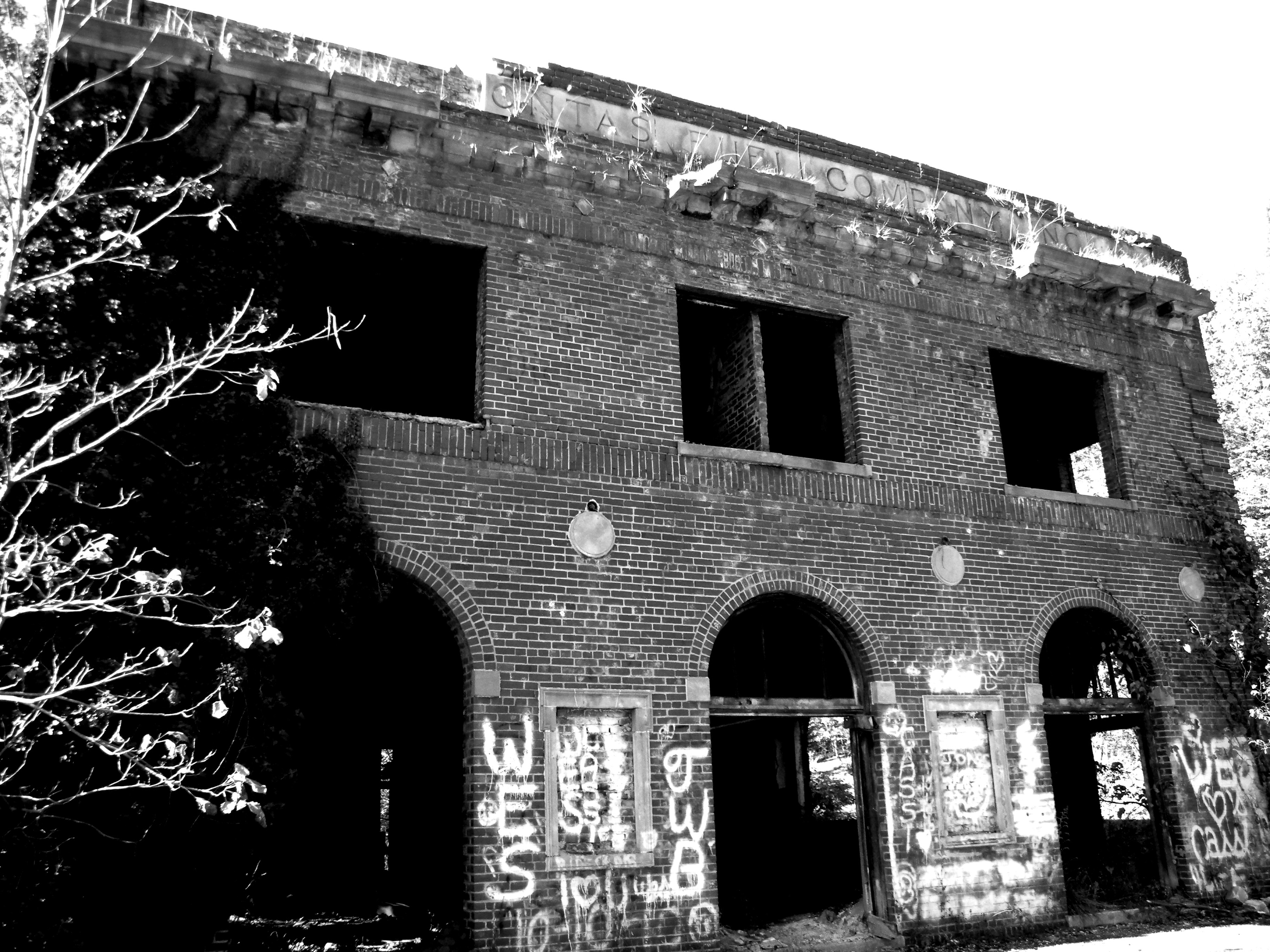
Office building at Jenkinjones, West Virginia, photographed in 2011

The two-story brick company store sits on a stone foundation. It features a brick cornice with a concrete parapet and a concrete entablature with dentils in the Classical Revival style. The store building housed the store and a post office.

The office is a two-story brick building with a flat roof. It has a bold concrete cornice with dentils across the front facade.

== See also ==
- Pocahontas Fuel Company Store (Maybeury, West Virginia)
- Pocahontas Fuel Company Store (Switchback, West Virginia)
