= Empire Coal Company Store =

- U.S. National Register of Historic Places
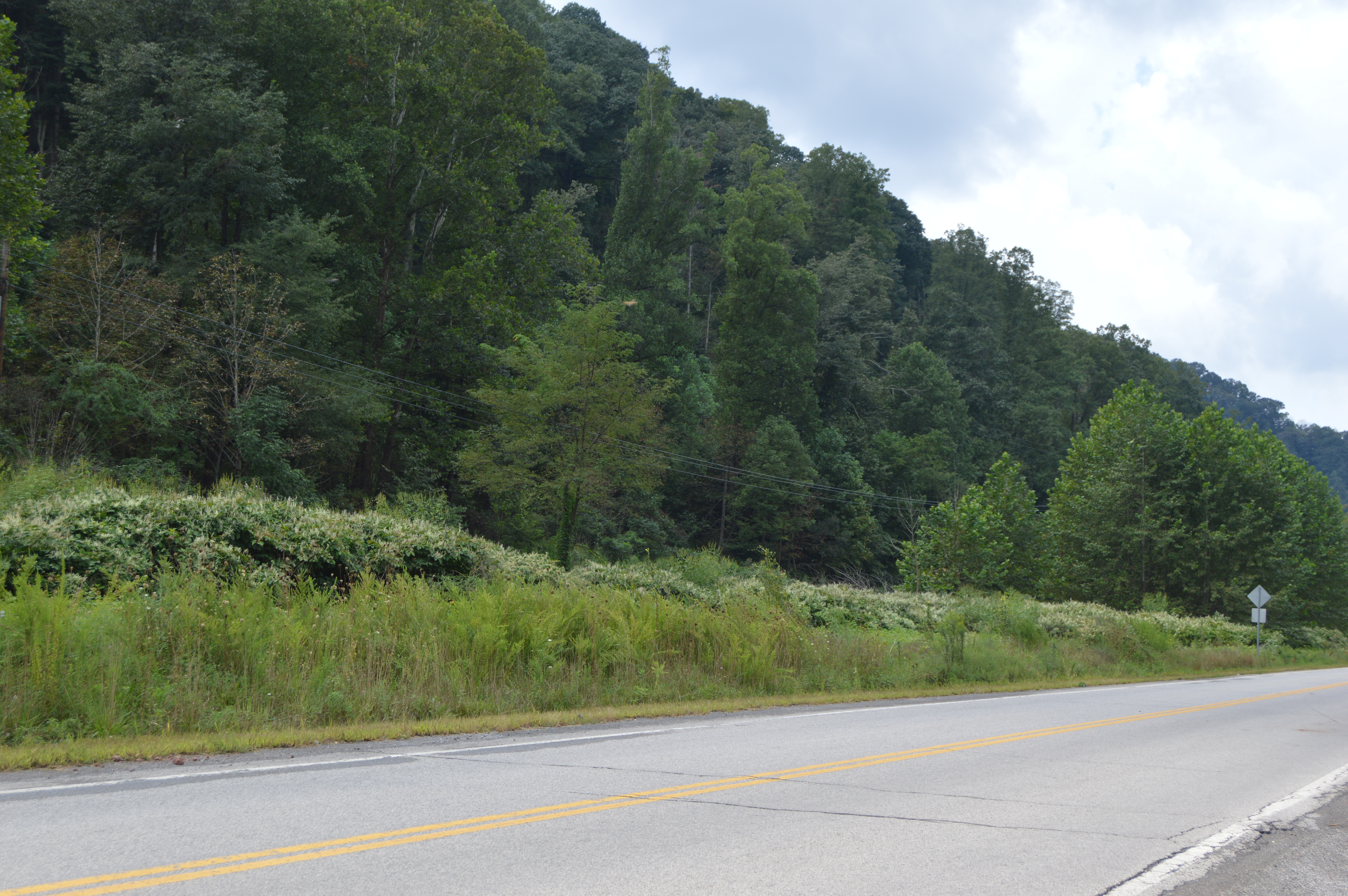
- Site of the store

- Location within West Virginia Location within the United States
- Location: U.S. Route 52, Landgraff, West Virginia
- Coordinates: 37°24′43″N 81°28′28″W
- Area: Less than 1 acre (0.40 ha)
- Architectural style: Late 19th And Early 20th Century American Movements
- MPS: Coal Company Stores in McDowell County MPS
- NRHP reference No.: 92000321
- Added to NRHP: April 17, 1992

Empire Coal Company Store was a historic company store building located at Landgraff, McDowell County, West Virginia. It was a one- to two-story frame building on a brick foundation with a hipped roof.

It was listed on the National Register of Historic Places in 1992. The building has been demolished.
