= James Ellwood Jones House =

Historic house in West Virginia, United States

- U.S. National Register of Historic Places
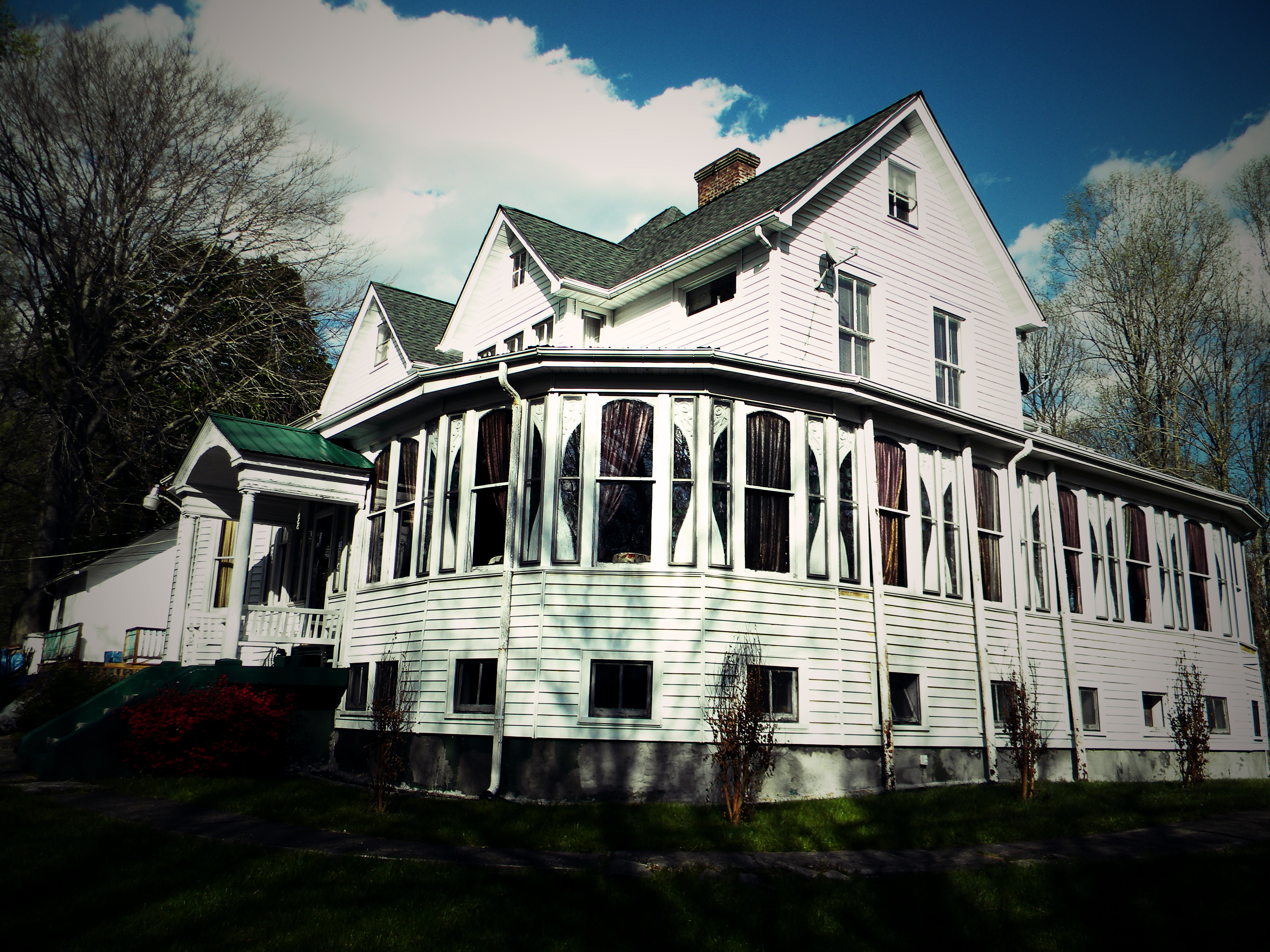
- Mansion of James Ellwood Jones

- Location within West Virginia Location within the United States
- Location: N of US 52, E of Turkey Gap Branch, Switchback, West Virginia
- Coordinates: 37°22′17″N 81°22′52″W
- Area: 4 acres (1.6 ha)
- Architectural style: Late 19th And Early 20th Century American Movements
- NRHP reference No.: 92000306
- Added to NRHP: April 2, 1992

James Ellwood Jones House is a historic home located at Switchback, McDowell County, West Virginia. It is a two-story, frame dwelling with an irregular plan. It features a classically detailed, pedimented porch, and stained glass windows. Also on the property are a contributing swimming pool dated to the 1920s, a detached covered patio, a circular fountain, terraced garden, and greenhouse. It was built for James Ellwood Jones, an influential leader in southern West Virginia's coal mining industry.

It was listed on the National Register of Historic Places in 1992.

== History ==
James Ellwood Jones (1874-1932) was born in Trevertown, Pennsylvania. He was the general manager of the Pocahontas Fuel Company which was founded by his father, Jenkin B Jones, the namesake for the coal town of Jenkinjones, West Virginia.
