= Ashland Company Store =

- U.S. National Register of Historic Places
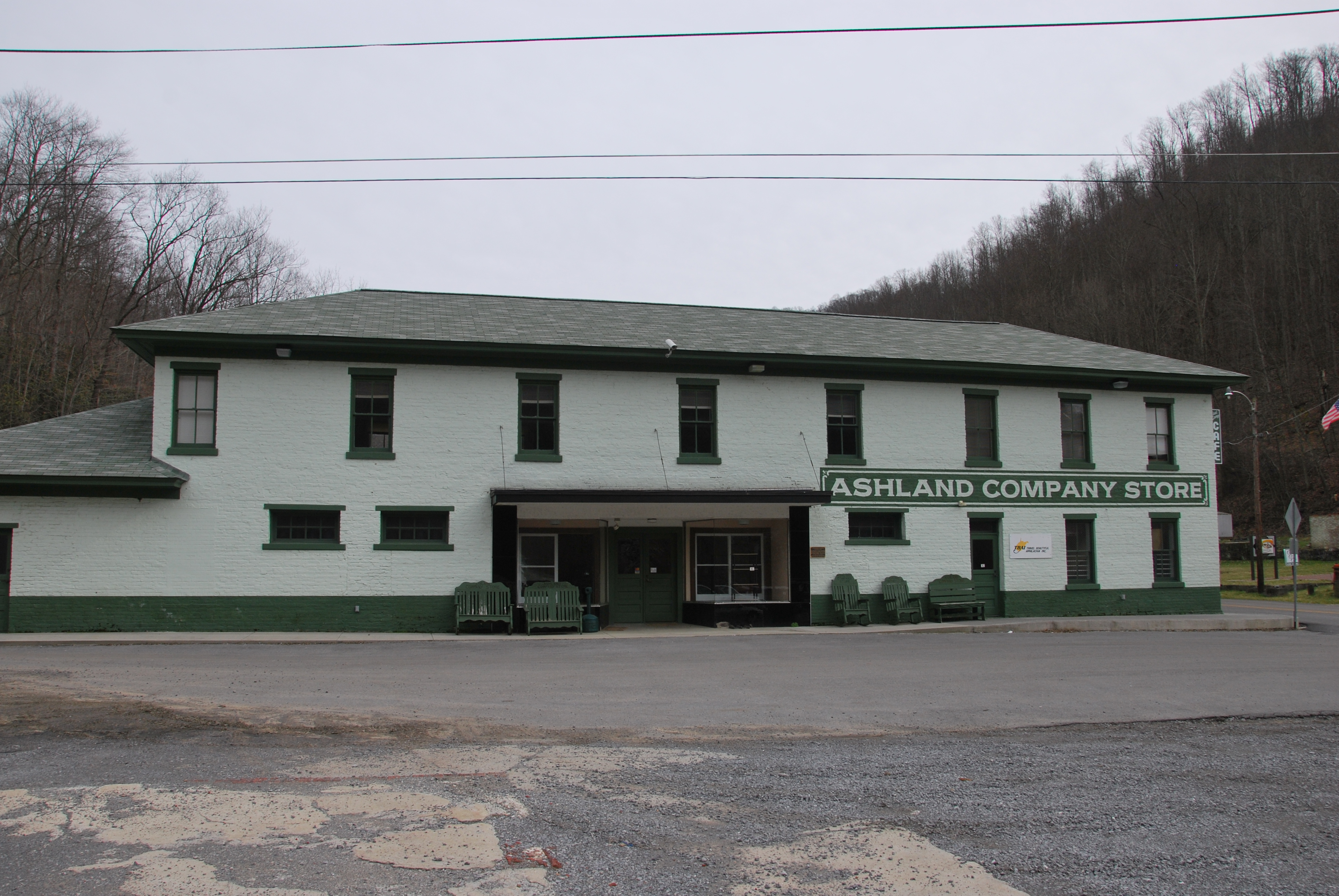
- Ashland Company Store in February 2012

- Location within West Virginia Location within the United States
- Location: County Route 17, Ashland, West Virginia
- Coordinates: 37°24′33″N 81°21′14″W
- Area: less than one acre
- Built: 1907
- Architect: Ashland Coal Co.
- Architectural style: Early Commercial
- MPS: Coal Company Stores in McDowell County MPS
- NRHP reference No.: 05000399
- Added to NRHP: May 5, 2005

Ashland Company Store is a historic company store building located at Ashland, McDowell County, West Virginia. It was built in 1907, and is a two-story brick commercial building on a brick and stone foundation. It has a low hipped roof. In addition to the store, the building housed a warehouse, the paymaster's office, U.S. Post Office, and company offices. The post office was in use until 1991. Also on the property is a gym building (c. 1907).

It was listed on the National Register of Historic Places in 2005.
