= Gary, West Virginia =

- City
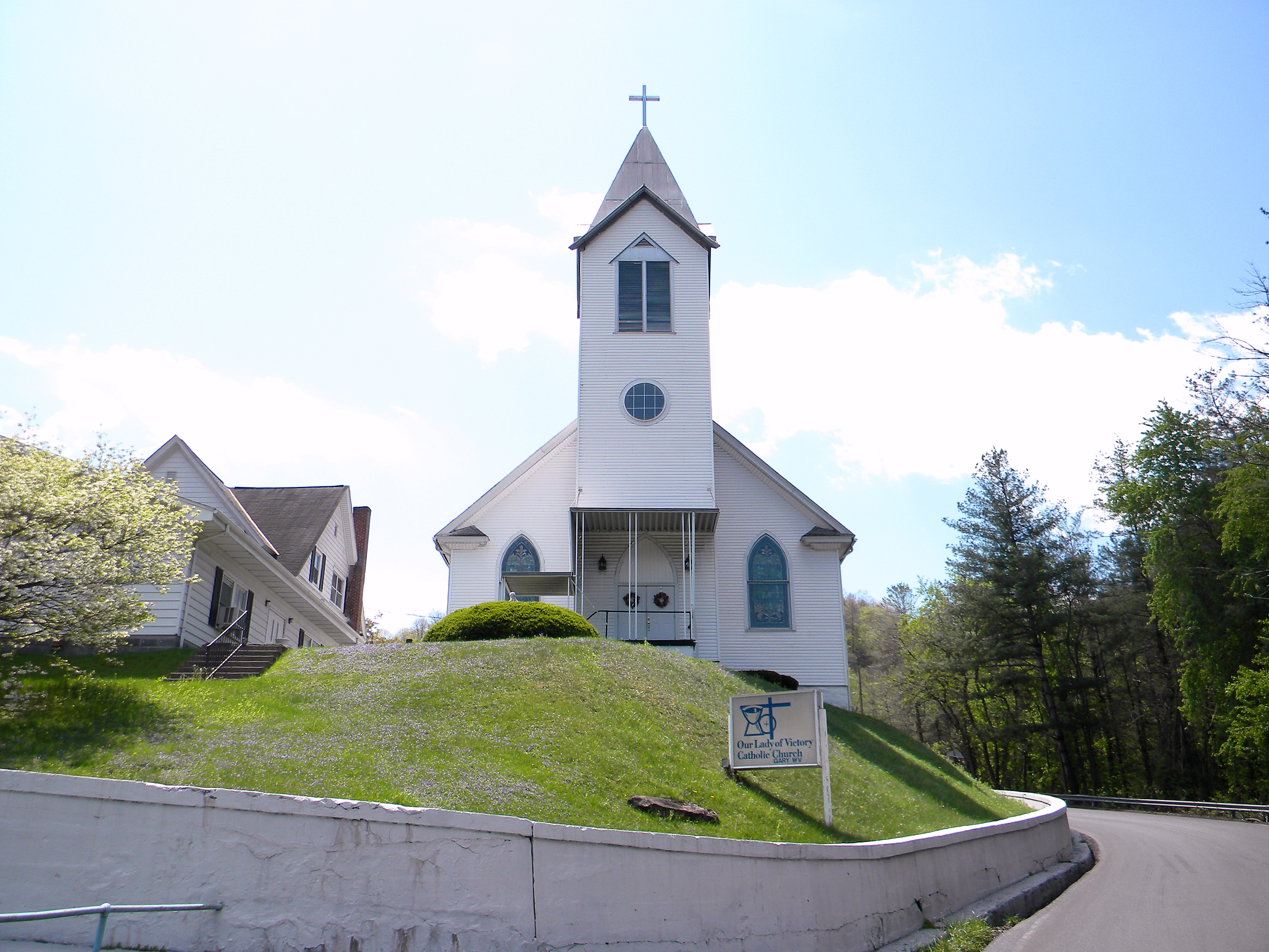
- Our Lady of Victory Catholic Church

- Location of Gary in McDowell County, West Virginia (left) and of McDowell County in West Virginia (right)

- Location in the United States
- Coordinates: 37°21′41″N 81°32′11″W
- Country: United States
- State: West Virginia
- County: McDowell
- Founded: 1902
- Incorporated: July 1, 1971
- Named for: Elbert H. Gary

Government
  - Type: Mayor–council
  - Mayor: Robert Little

Area
  - Total: 0.87 sq mi (2.26 km^{2})
  - Land: 0.84 sq mi (2.18 km^{2})
  - Water: 0.031 sq mi (0.08 km^{2})
- Elevation: 1,411 ft (430 m)

Population (2020)
  - Total: 773
  - Estimate (2021): 730
  - Density: 937.3/sq mi (361.88/km^{2})
- Time zone: UTC−05:00 (EST)
  - Summer (DST): UTC-04:00 (EDT)
- ZIP Code: 24836
- Area codes: 304, 681
- FIPS code: 54-30196
- GNIS feature ID: 1554536

Gary is a city located along the Tug Fork River in McDowell County, West Virginia, United States. According to the 2020 census, the city had a population of 762. It was named for Elbert Henry Gary, one of the founders of U.S. Steel. The former coal towns of Elbert, Filbert, Thorpe, and Wilcoe became part of Gary at the time of its incorporation in 1971.

== History ==
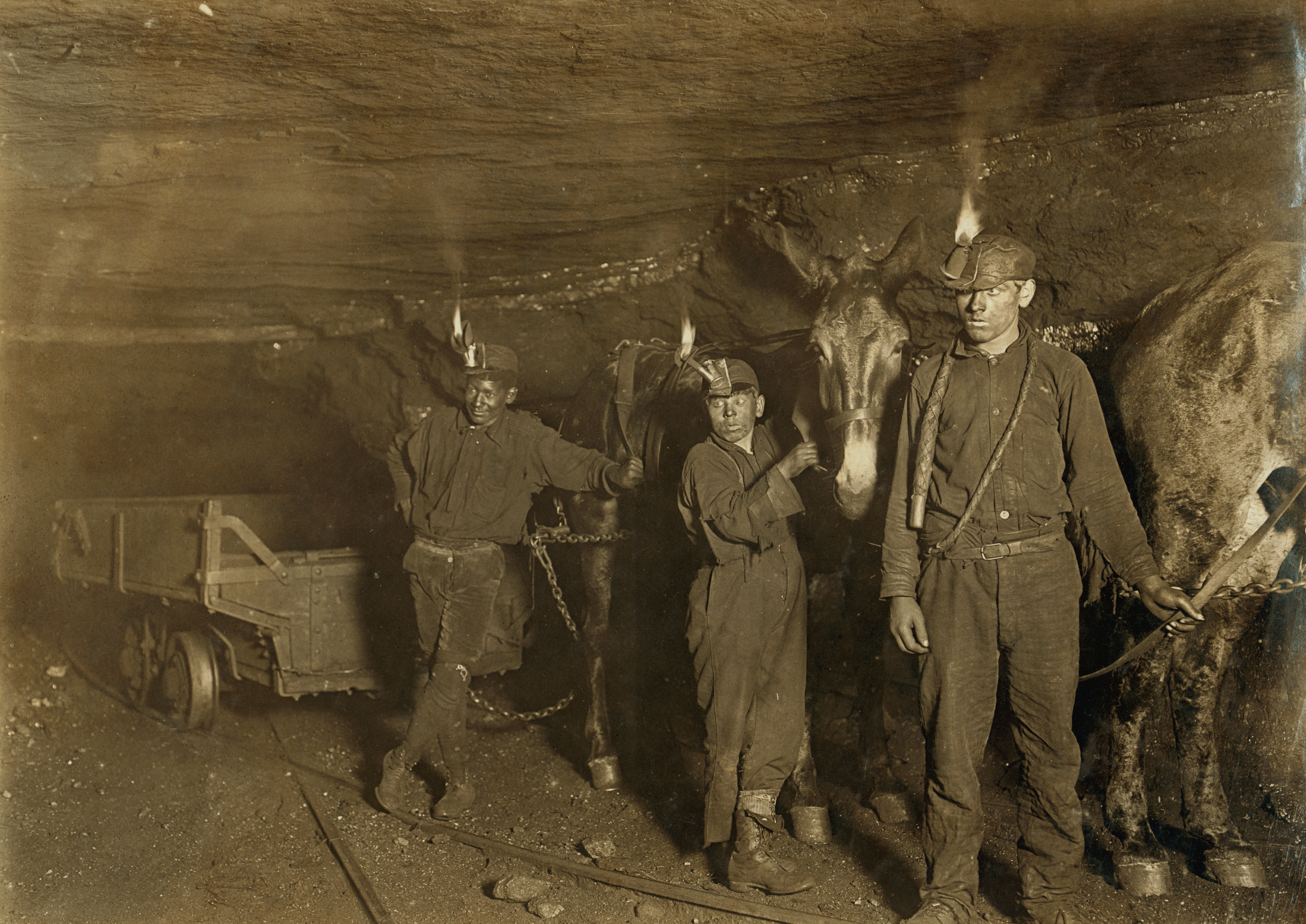
Child coal miners in Gary, photographed in 1908 by Lewis Hine

In 1902, U.S. Steel began housing people in Gary Hollow for employment at one of the coal town's fourteen mines that produced metallurgical coal.

During the early 1940s, Gary Hollow, named for Elbert Henry Gary, produced around a quarter of the amount of coal mined from McDowell County, as well as a quarter of the coal used by U.S. Steel during World War II. At the time, the town boasted a large number of African American miners and began integrating the school system in the 1950s. However, Gary Hollow's education system was not completely integrated until 1964.

On July 1, 1971, the city of Gary was incorporated after the city held an election on March 16, 1970. Beginning in the 1970s, Gary's unemployment rate began to increase after most of the high-quality metallurgical coal had already been mined. In March 1982 alone, around 550 miners employed by U.S. Steel in the town were laid off. By the end of 1982, all U.S. Steel mines located in Gary were closed. Former mayor, Charles Hodge claimed that U.S. Steel failed to make an effort help the city.

In March 1983, the unemployment rate rose to 90%, the highest of any town in the United States. Four years later, Gary Enterprise reopened one of the mines after purchasing it from U.S. Steel, and other companies arranged sub-leases to mine the remaining coal that was accessible. In 1990, Gary only had 180 mining jobs. Two years later, the now demolished U.S. Coal and Coke Company Store at Ream was listed on the National Register of Historic Places. In July 2003, U.S. Steel announced that they sold their remaining assets to PinnOak Resources.

== Geography ==
According to the U.S. Census Bureau, Gary has a total area of 0.87 square miles (2.25 km^{2}), of which 0.84 square miles (2.18 km^{2}) is land and 0.03 square miles (0.08 km^{2}) is water.

Gary has a railway station on the Norfolk Southern Railway, known previously as the Norfolk and Western network.

=== Climate ===
Climate data for Gary, West Virginia
Month	Jan	Feb	Mar	Apr	May	Jun	Jul	Aug	Sep	Oct	Nov	Dec	Year
Record high °F (°C)	79 (26)	79 (26)	87 (31)	90 (32)	94 (34)	102 (39)	102 (39)	100 (38)	100 (38)	92 (33)	83 (28)	79 (26)	102 (39)
Mean daily maximum °F (°C)	44 (7)	48 (9)	56 (13)	67 (19)	75 (24)	82 (28)	86 (30)	85 (29)	78 (26)	68 (20)	58 (14)	48 (9)	66 (19)
Mean daily minimum °F (°C)	21 (−6)	24 (−4)	30 (−1)	37 (3)	46 (8)	55 (13)	60 (16)	60 (16)	53 (12)	40 (4)	31 (−1)	24 (−4)	40 (5)
Record low °F (°C)	−26 (−32)	−6 (−21)	−6 (−21)	15 (−9)	26 (−3)	32 (0)	39 (4)	40 (4)	30 (−1)	14 (−10)	1 (−17)	−9 (−23)	−26 (−32)
Average precipitation inches (mm)	3.61 (92)	3.00 (76)	3.40 (86)	3.73 (95)	4.25 (108)	3.54 (90)	4.20 (107)	3.89 (99)	2.87 (73)	2.73 (69)	2.74 (70)	2.70 (69)	40.66 (1,033)
Source: The Weather Channel.

== Demographics ==
=== 2020 census ===
As of the 2020 census, Gary had a population of 773. The median age was 54.4 years. 14.0% of residents were under the age of 18 and 30.5% of residents were 65 years of age or older. For every 100 females there were 89.5 males, and for every 100 females age 18 and over there were 80.7 males age 18 and over.

0.0% of residents lived in urban areas, while 100.0% lived in rural areas.

There were 322 households in Gary, of which 17.4% had children under the age of 18 living in them. Of all households, 33.5% were married-couple households, 19.3% were households with a male householder and no spouse or partner present, and 44.1% were households with a female householder and no spouse or partner present. About 42.9% of all households were made up of individuals and 18.3% had someone living alone who was 65 years of age or older.

There were 438 housing units, of which 26.5% were vacant. The homeowner vacancy rate was 1.9% and the rental vacancy rate was 20.0%.

Racial composition as of the 2020 census
Race	Number	Percent
White	551	71.3%
Black or African American	187	24.2%
American Indian and Alaska Native	2	0.3%
Asian	3	0.4%
Native Hawaiian and Other Pacific Islander	0	0.0%
Some other race	7	0.9%
Two or more races	23	3.0%
Hispanic or Latino (of any race)	3	0.4%

=== 2010 census ===
Historical population
Census	Pop.	Note	%±
1960	1,393		—
1980	2,233		—
1990	1,355		−39.3%
2000	917		−32.3%
2010	968		5.6%
2020	773		−20.1%
2021 (est.)	730		−5.6%
U.S. Decennial Census

As of the census of 2010, there were 968 people, 391 households, and 244 families living in the city. The population density was 1,152.4 inhabitants per square mile (444.9/km^{2}). There were 536 housing units at an average density of 638.1 per square mile (246.4/km^{2}). The racial makeup of the city was 70.8% White, 27.7% African American, 0.1% Native American, 0.2% Asian, 0.2% from other races, and 1.0% from two or more races. Hispanic or Latino of any race were 0.6% of the population.

There were 391 households, of which 26.3% had children under the age of 18 living with them, 38.4% were married couples living together, 19.4% had a female householder with no husband present, 4.6% had a male householder with no wife present, and 37.6% were non-families. 34.0% of all households were made up of individuals, and 18.2% had someone living alone who was 65 years of age or older. The average household size was 2.20 and the average family size was 2.77.

The median age in the city was 52.4 years. 16.9% of residents were under the age of 18; 6.2% were between the ages of 18 and 24; 18% were from 25 to 44; 28.2% were from 45 to 64; and 30.7% were 65 years of age or older. The gender makeup of the city was 46.2% male and 53.8% female.

=== 2000 census ===
As of the census of 2000, there were 917 people, 420 households, and 260 families living in the city. The population density was 1,024.0 people per square mile (393.4/km^{2}). There were 542 housing units at an average density of 605.2 per square mile (232.5/km^{2}). The racial makeup of the city was 61.40% White, 35.55% African American, 0.11% Native American, and 2.94% from two or more races. Hispanic or Latino of any race were 0.55% of the population.

There were 420 households, out of which 17.1% had children under the age of 18 living with them, 43.8% were married couples living together, 14.8% had a female householder with no husband present, and 37.9% were non-families. 36.0% of all households were made up of individuals, and 23.3% had someone living alone who was 65 years of age or older. The average household size was 2.18 and the average family size was 2.77.

In the city, the population was spread out, with 19.0% under the age of 18, 5.7% from 18 to 24, 18.4% from 25 to 44, 25.0% from 45 to 64, and 32.0% who were 65 years of age or older. The median age was 50 years. For every 100 females, there were 86.4 males. For every 100 females age 18 and over, there were 78.6 males.

The median income for a household in the city was $22,857, and the median income for a family was $30,938. Males had a median income of $28,750 versus $17,019 for females. The per capita income for the city was $13,233. About 24.2% of families and 30.8% of the population were below the poverty line, including 58.2% of those under age 18 and 18.5% of those age 65 or over.

== Notable person ==
- Johnny Bero, professional baseball player who was an infielder for parts of two seasons with the Detroit Tigers and St. Louis Browns.
