= Pocahontas Fuel Company Store (Switchback, West Virginia) =

- U.S. National Register of Historic Places
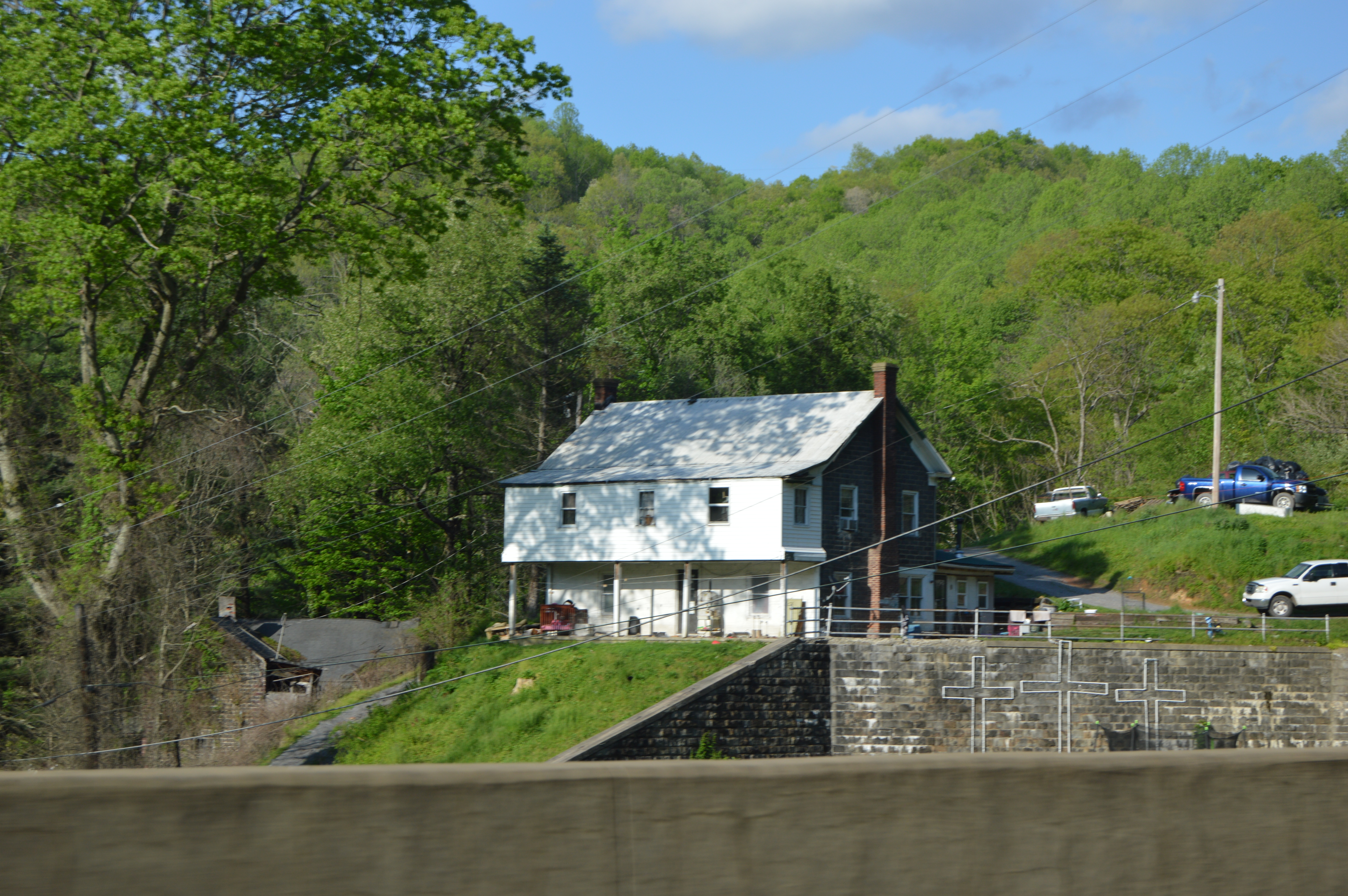
- Site of the store

- Location within West Virginia Location within the United States
- Location: U.S. Route 52 at Switchback, West Virginia
- Coordinates: 37°22′13″N 81°23′5″W
- Area: less than one acre
- Architect: Alex B. Mahood
- Architectural style: Classical Revival
- MPS: Coal Company Stores in McDowell County MPS
- NRHP reference No.: 92000330
- Added to NRHP: April 17, 1992

The Pocahontas Fuel Company Store was a historic Pocahontas Fuel Company company store building located at Switchback, McDowell County, West Virginia. It was designed by architect Alex B. Mahood, and built in 1917. It was a two-story brick building with a one-story wing that housed the business office. It had a flat roof, sat on a high stone foundation, and featured Neoclassical detailing. It had a brick cornice with a concrete parapet and a concrete entablature with dentils.

It was listed on the National Register of Historic Places in 1992.

== See also ==
- Pocahontas Fuel Company Store (Jenkinjones, West Virginia)
- Pocahontas Fuel Company Store (Maybeury, West Virginia)
