= Havaco, West Virginia =

Havaco
- Unincorporated community
- Location within the state of West Virginia Havaco (the United States)
- Coordinates: 37°24′36″N 81°34′38″W
- Country: United States
- State: West Virginia
- County: McDowell
- Time zone: UTC-5 (Eastern (EST))
  - Summer (DST): UTC-4 (EDT)
- ZIP codes: 24841
- GNIS feature ID: 1540071

Havaco is an unincorporated community on the Tug Fork River in McDowell County, West Virginia, United States.

== Notable people ==
- Rick Tolley, former NCAA football coach
