= Pocahontas Fuel Company Store (Maybeury, West Virginia) =

- U.S. National Register of Historic Places
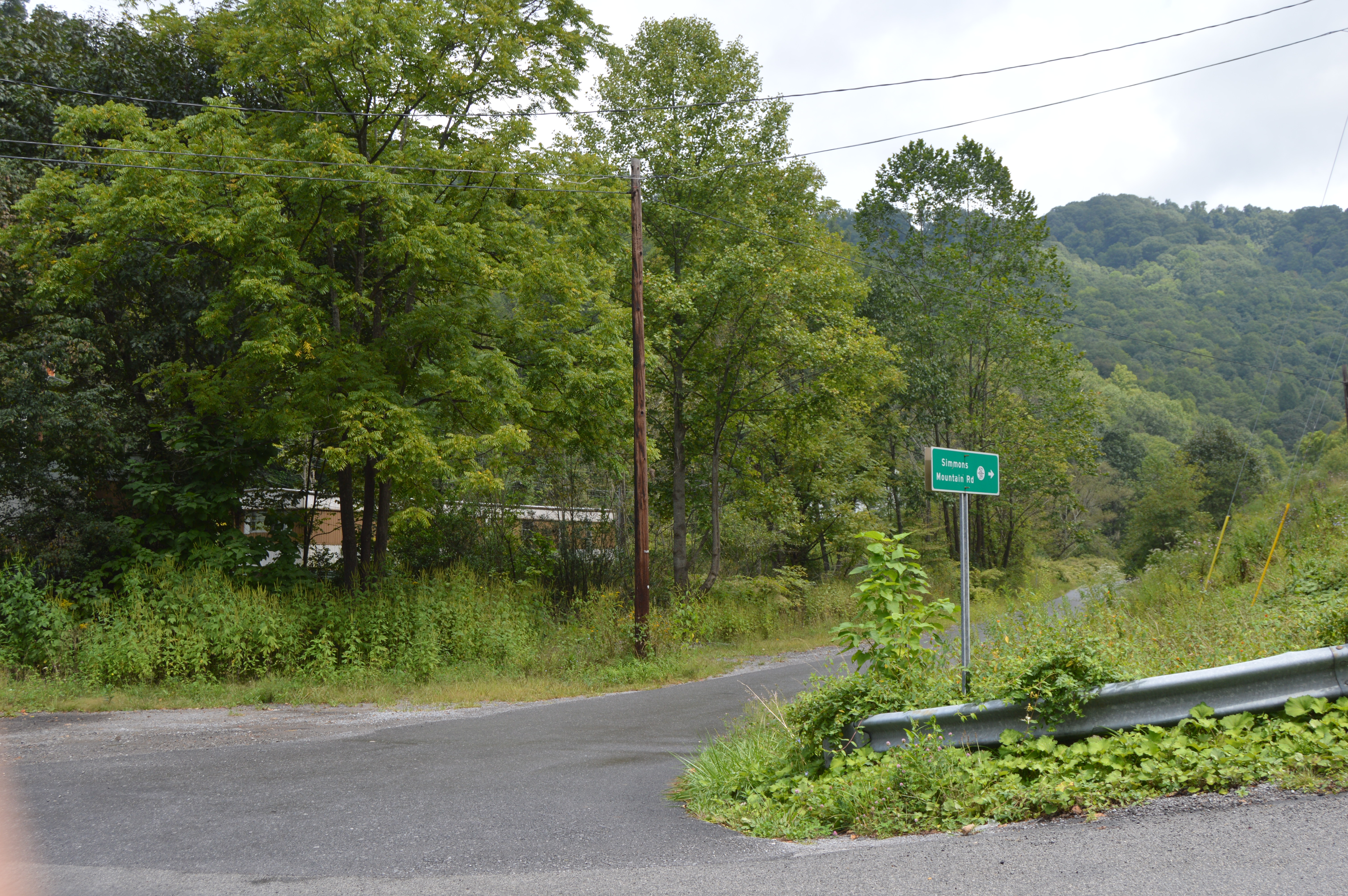
- Site of the store

- Location within West Virginia Location within the United States
- Location: U.S. Route 52, Maybeury, West Virginia
- Coordinates: 37°22′32.5″N 81°21′48″W
- Area: Less than 1 acre (0.40 ha)
- Architectural style: Box plan
- MPS: Coal Company Stores in McDowell County MPS
- NRHP reference No.: 92000324
- Added to NRHP: April 17, 1992

Pocahontas Fuel Company Store, also known as Norfolk Coal & Coke Company Store and Henderson Market, was a historic Pocahontas Fuel Company company store building located at Maybeury, McDowell County, West Virginia. It was built before 1903, and was a one- to two-story wood-frame building on a stone foundation. It featured a pyramidal roof in one corner.

It was listed on the National Register of Historic Places in 1992. It was demolished sometime after March 2005.

== See also ==
- Pocahontas Fuel Company Store (Jenkinjones, West Virginia)
- Pocahontas Fuel Company Store (Switchback, West Virginia)
