= Wilcoe, West Virginia =

Wilcoe
- Unincorporated community
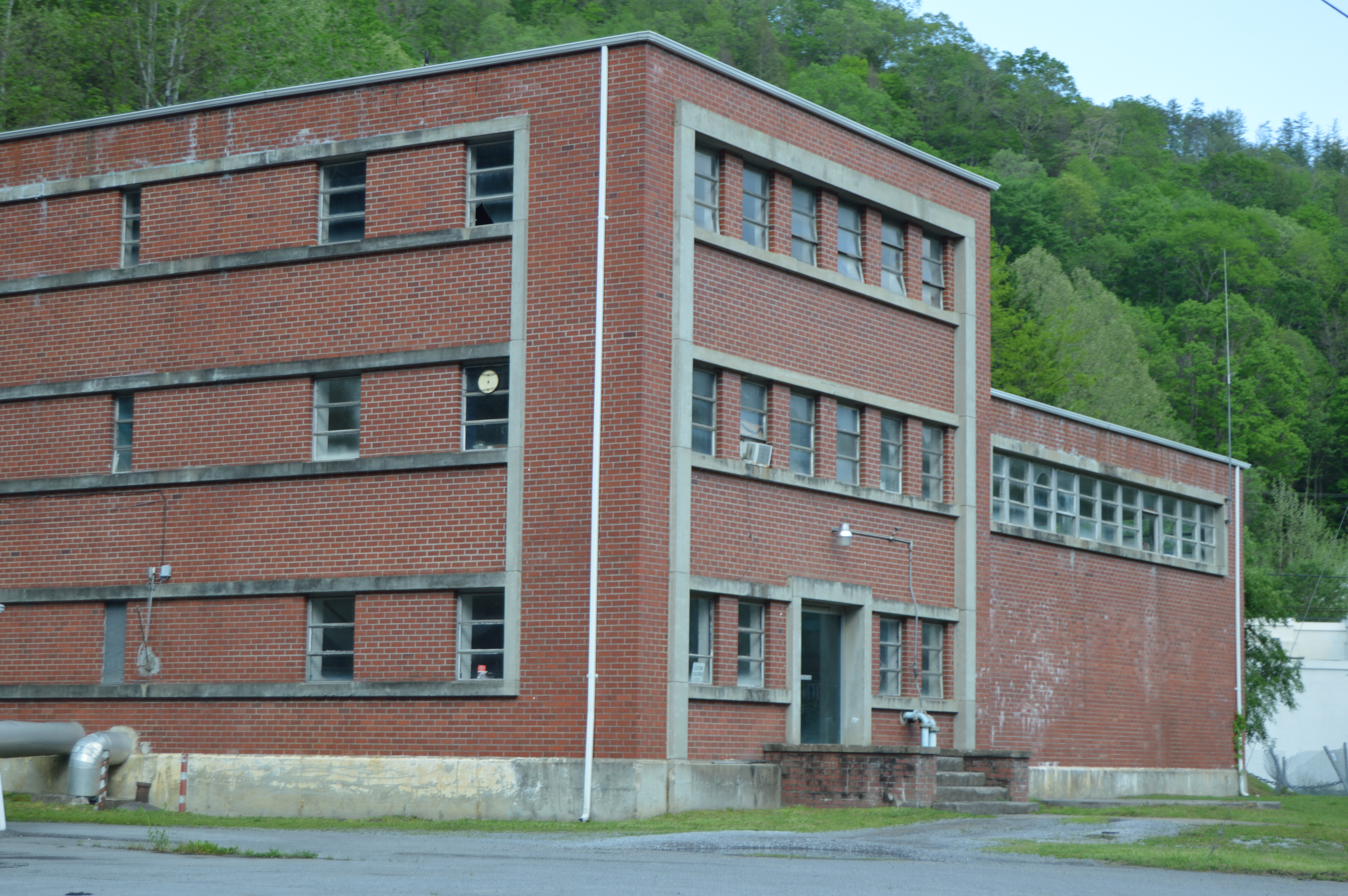
- Former store on WV 103

- Location within the state of West Virginia
- Coordinates: 37°22′52″N 81°33′50″W
- Country: United States
- State: West Virginia
- County: McDowell
- Elevation: 1,378 ft (420 m)
- Time zone: UTC-5 (Eastern (EST))
  - Summer (DST): UTC-4 (EDT)
- ZIP code: 24895
- Area codes: 304 & 681
- GNIS feature ID: 1555983

Wilcoe is a former coal town located in McDowell County, West Virginia, United States. Wilcoe was once an independent community and was incorporated into Gary in 1971. Wilcoe has its own post office with ZIP code 24895.
