= Maybeury, West Virginia =

Maybeury
- Census-designated place (CDP)
- Location of Maybeury in West Virginia
- Coordinates: 37°22′15″N 81°21′59″W
- Country: United States
- State: West Virginia
- County: McDowell

Area
  - Total: 1.668 sq mi (4.32 km^{2})
  - Land: 1.667 sq mi (4.32 km^{2})
  - Water: 0.001 sq mi (0.0026 km^{2})
- Elevation: 2,073 ft (632 m)

Population (2020)
  - Total: 109
  - Density: 65.4/sq mi (25.2/km^{2})
- Time zone: UTC-5 (Eastern (EST))
  - Summer (DST): UTC-4 (EDT)
- ZIP code: 24861
- Area code: 304
- GNIS feature ID: 1555071

Maybeury is a census-designated place (CDP) in McDowell County, West Virginia, United States, located on U.S. Route 52 between Northfork and Bramwell. As of the 2020 census, its population was 109 (down from 234 at the 2010 census).

Maybeury was built by Shamokin Coal & Coke Co. circa 1890, and it was named for coal operators James May and William Beury.

== History ==
In 1890, it was the largest town in McDowell County, with a population of 875. This was due to the coal mining start-ups in the town. Maybeury was the fifth largest town/city south of the state capital, Charleston, and listed as the 31st largest town/city in the state.

John F. Kennedy stopped in Maybeury at the Esso station during his presidential primary campaign in 1960. During a speech in Canton, Ohio on September 27, 1960, he stated: "McDowell County mines more coal than it ever has in its history, probably more coal than any county in the United States and yet there are more people getting surplus food packages in McDowell County than any county in the United States. The reason is that machines are doing the jobs of men, and we have not been able to find jobs for those men."

The now demolished Pocahontas Fuel Company Store was listed on the National Register of Historic Places in 1992.
