= Switchback, West Virginia =

Switchback
- Unincorporated community
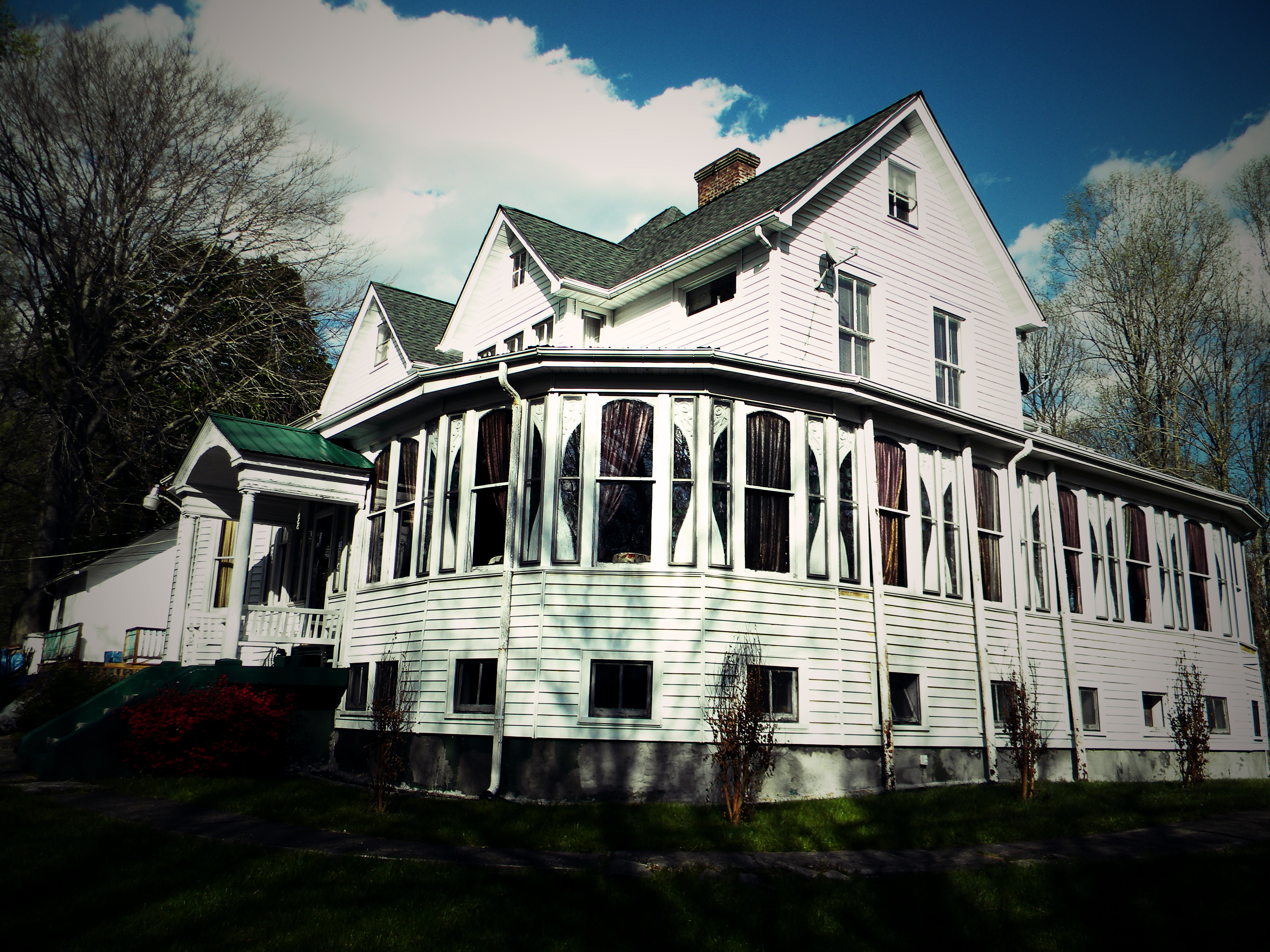
- James Ellwood Jones House

- Location within the state of West Virginia Switchback (the United States)
- Coordinates: 37°22′16″N 81°23′8″W
- Country: United States
- State: West Virginia
- County: McDowell
- Time zone: UTC-5 (Eastern (EST))
  - Summer (DST): UTC-4 (EDT)
- GNIS feature ID: 1555770

Switchback is an unincorporated community in McDowell County, West Virginia, United States. Switchback had its own high school called Elkhorn High School in operation from 1923 to 1953.

The community's name most likely refers to the shape of nearby railroad tracks. The James Ellwood Jones House and Pocahontas Fuel Company Store were listed on the National Register of Historic Places in 1992.
