= Ashland, West Virginia =

Unincorporated community in West Virginia, United States

Ashland
- Unincorporated community
- Location within the state of West Virginia Ashland (the United States)
- Coordinates: 37°24′30″N 81°21′9″W
- Country: United States
- State: West Virginia
- County: McDowell
- Time zone: UTC-5 (Eastern (EST))
  - Summer (DST): UTC-4 (EDT)
- ZIP codes: 24868
- Area code: 304
- GNIS feature ID: 1553758

Ashland is an unincorporated community located in McDowell County, West Virginia, United States. Located on the headwaters of the North Fork of Elkhorn Creek, it is also the location of the national historic Ashland Company Store and the Ashland Trailhead for the Indian Ridge Trail, a part of the Hatfield McCoy Trail System.

The Ashland Resort is located one mile above Ashland.

== Notable people ==
- Garnet Mimms, 1960s soul singer
