= Upland, McDowell County, West Virginia =

Upland
- Unincorporated community
- Location within West Virginia Upland (the United States)
- Coordinates: 37°23′33″N 81°25′17″W
- Country: United States
- State: West Virginia
- County: McDowell
- Elevation: 1,857 ft (566 m)
- Time zone: UTC-5 (Eastern (EST))
  - Summer (DST): UTC-4 (EDT)
- Area codes: 304 & 681
- GNIS feature ID: 1555858

Upland is an unincorporated community in McDowell County, West Virginia, United States. Upland is located on U.S. Route 52, 2 miles (3.2 km) south-southeast of Northfork.
