= U.S. Coal and Coke Company Store =

- U.S. Coal and Coke Company
- U.S. National Register of Historic Places
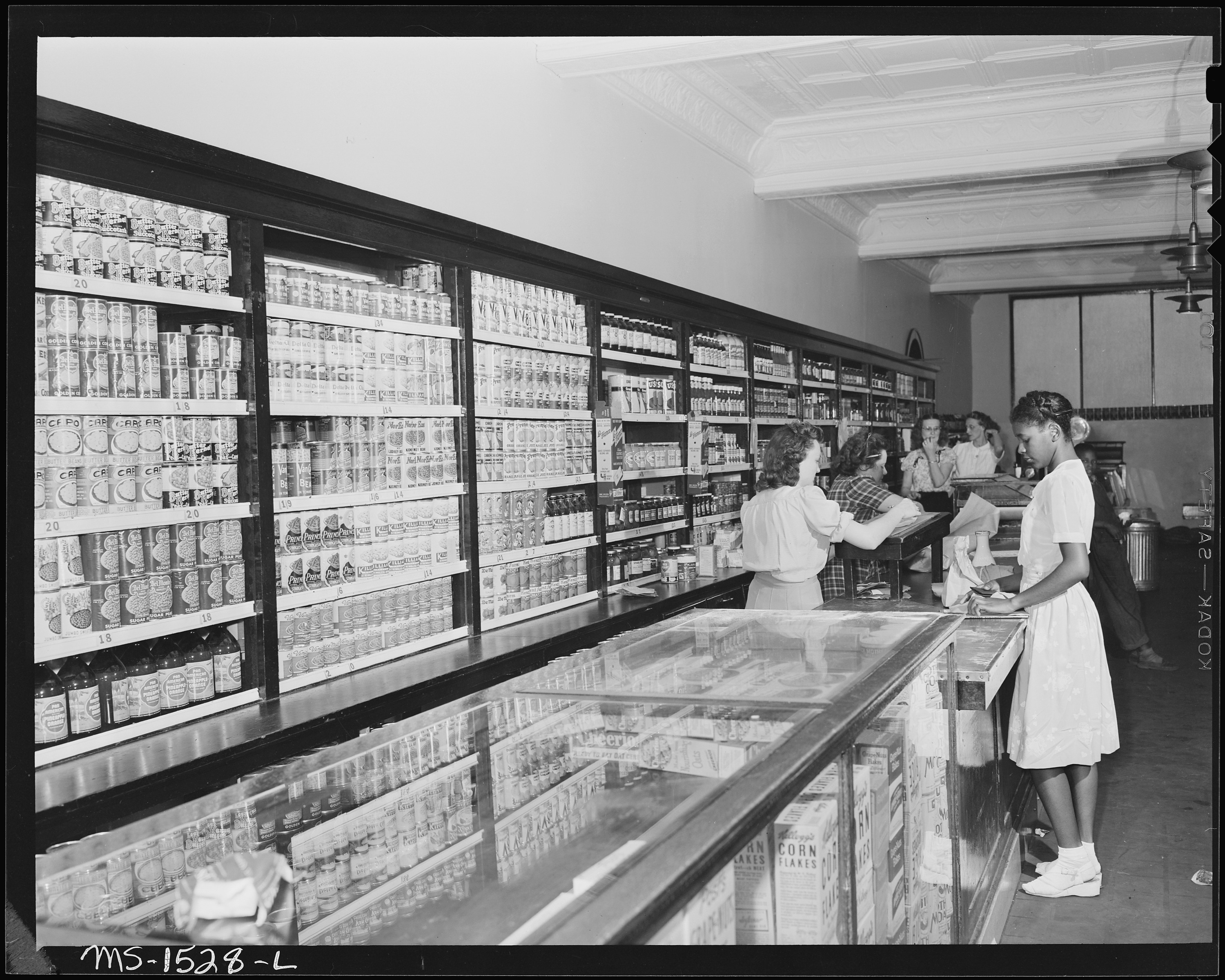
- U.S. Coal and Coke Company Store scene, 1946

- Location within West Virginia Location within the United States
- Location: Co. Rt. 13/2, Ream, West Virginia
- Coordinates: 37°21′5″N 81°32′51″W
- Area: less than one acre
- Architectural style: Box plan
- MPS: Coal Company Stores in McDowell County MPS
- NRHP reference No.: 92000327
- Added to NRHP: April 17, 1992

U.S. Coal and Coke Company Store was a historic company store building located at Ream, McDowell County, West Virginia. It was built about 1910, and was two-story, square-plan brick building. It featured segmental arched windows and simple decoration.

It was listed on the National Register of Historic Places in 1992. It was demolished sometime between March 2004 and 2006 after being subject of an arson attack.
