= Elbert, West Virginia =

Elbert
- Unincorporated community
- Location within the state of West Virginia
- Coordinates: 37°20′7″N 81°32′21″W
- Country: United States
- State: West Virginia
- County: McDowell
- Time zone: UTC-5 (Eastern (EST))
  - Summer (DST): UTC-4 (EDT)
- GNIS feature ID: 1554378

Elbert is an unincorporated community located in McDowell County, West Virginia, United States. Founded as a coal town, the community is now part of the City of Gary after its post office closed. Elbert was an independent community and was incorporated into Gary, West Virginia in 1971.

== Demographics ==
Historical population
Census	Pop.	Note	%±
1950	1,565		—
U.S. Decennial Census
