= Thorpe, West Virginia =

Thorpe
- Unincorporated community
- Location within the state of West Virginia
- Coordinates: 37°22′07″N 81°30′59″W
- Country: United States
- State: West Virginia
- County: McDowell
- Elevation: 1,437 ft (438 m)
- Time zone: UTC-5 (Eastern (EST))
  - Summer (DST): UTC-4 (EDT)
- ZIP code: 24888
- Area codes: 304 & 681
- GNIS feature ID: 1555807

Thorpe is an unincorporated community in McDowell County, West Virginia, United States.

== History ==
Thorpe was an independent community, but was incorporated into Gary in 1971.
