= Pocahontas Fuel Company =

Former US Coal and shipping Company

- Company type: Shareholder
- Industry: Coal, and shipping
- Founded: 1882
- Fate: Sold 1956
- Successor: Consolidation Coal Company; Consol Energy
- Key people: James Ellwood Jones

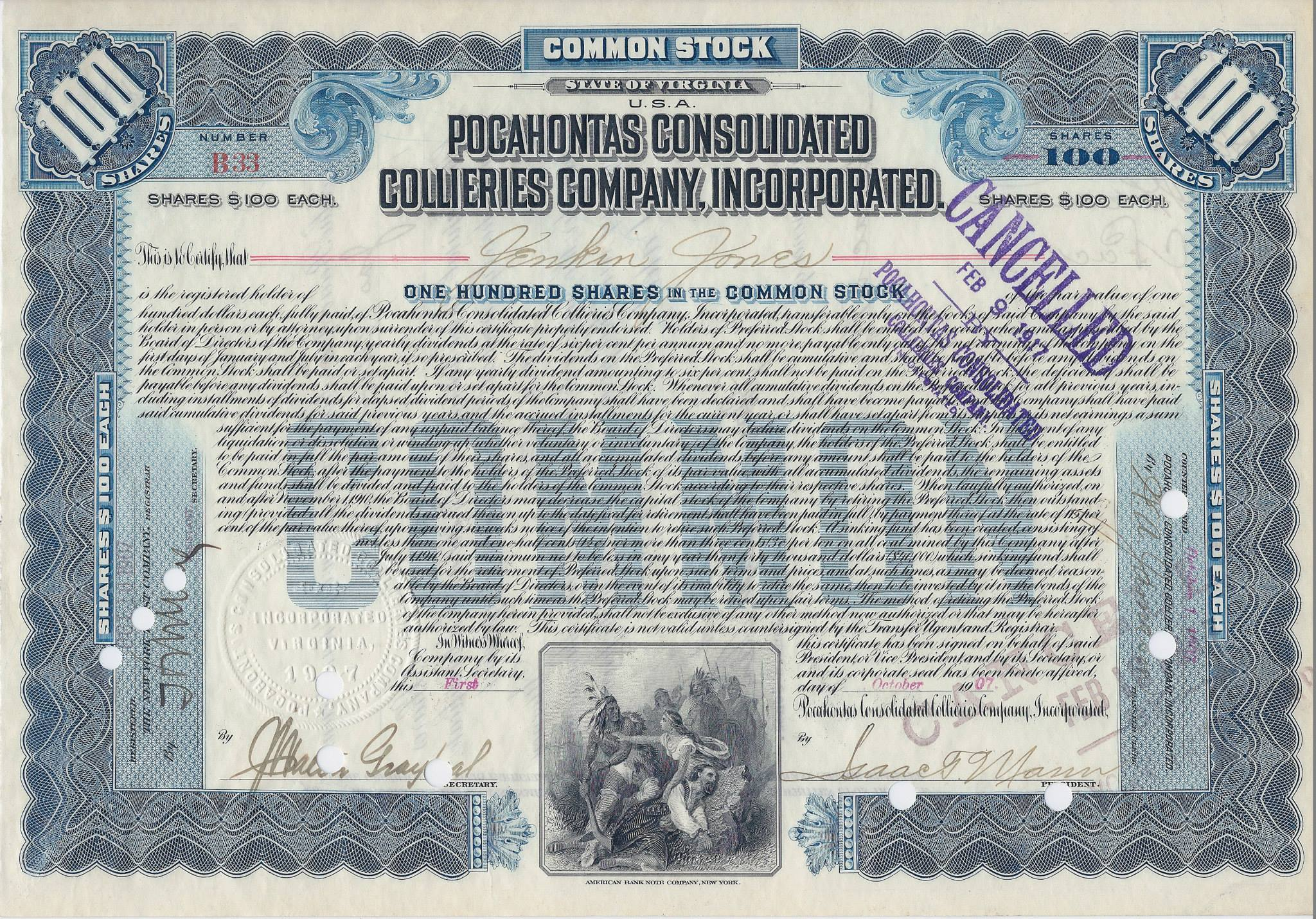
1907 Pocahontas Consolidated Stock Certificate

Pocahontas Fuel Company operated mines in the state of Virginia in Boissevain and Amonate, and in West Virginia at Jenkinjones, Bishop, and Itmann. Pocahontas Fuel Company founded the Pocahontas Consolidated Collieries Company in 1907. In 1956 Pocahontas was acquired by the Consolidation Coal Company. Consolidation Coal Company became Consol Energy in 1991. Consol Energy mines coal at Amonate. Pocahontas Fuel Company used the Norfolk & Western Railway bring the coal to ports for shipment.

== Pocahontas Coalfield ==
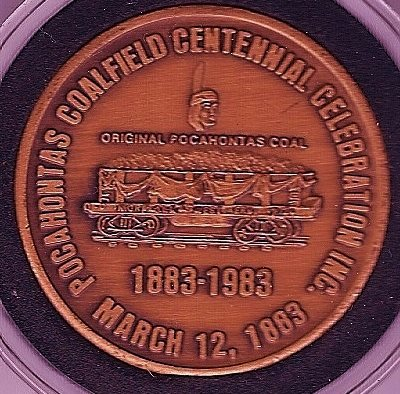
Pocahontas Coalfield Centennial Celebration medal

Pocahontas Coalfield is a large high quality coal deposit in Mercer County/McDowell County, West Virginia and Tazewell County, Virginia. The deposit mining started in 1883 in Pocahontas, Virginia at Pocahontas Mine No. 1, now on the National Register of Historic Places. The coal seams—Pocahontas No. 3, No. 4, No. 6, and No. 11—are some of the finest coal in the world, and are rated at 15,000 Btu/lb (35 MJ/kg).

== Pocahontas Exhibition Coal Mine ==
Pocahontas Exhibition Coal Mine is a U.S. National Register of Historic Places, as it is the first sub-bituminous coal mine in the Pocahontas Coalfield. In 1938 it was opened to the public, thus becoming the first exhibition coal mine in the United States.

== Pocahontas Fuel Company Store ==
Pocahontas Fuel Company Store and Office Buildings is a historic company store and an office building located at Jenkinjones, McDowell County, West Virginia. Both buildings were designed by architect Alex B. Mahood and built in 1917. They were listed on the National Register of Historic Places in 1992.

== Pocahontas Steamship Company ==
Pocahontas Steamship Company was a steamship shipping company that was founded in 1915 in New York City. Pocahontas Steamship Company mainly operated coal ships, called Collier ship. The coal ships loaded at Norfolk, Virginia and delivered the coal to New England ports. Pocahontas Steamship Company supported the World War II efforts. Pocahontas Steamship Company closed in 1961.

== World War II ==
Pocahontas Steamship Company fleet of ships were used to help the World War II effort. During World War II Pocahontas Steamship Company operated Merchant navy ships for the United States Shipping Board. During World War II Pocahontas Steamship Company was active with charter shipping with the Maritime Commission and War Shipping Administration. Pocahontas Steamship Company operated ships for the merchant navy. The ship was run by its Pocahontas Steamship Company crew and the US Navy supplied United States Navy Armed Guards to man the deck guns and radio.

== Ships ==
Some ships owned:

- Isaac T. Mann, coal ship, named after banker Isaac T. Man, he was on the company's board.
- Freeman
- Joe Nancy
- Oakley L. Alexander (I), bow sank March 3, 1947 one mile southeast of Dyer Point, in very heavy seas.
- Oakley L. Alexander II, a Victory ship, SS Laconia Victory
- Lynchburg Victory built in 1945, acquired in 1952 renamed Pocahontas Fuel, converted to 7,828 gtons collier.
- Consolidation Coal, a Type T2 tanker ship, was the Redstone, built in 1945, acquired in 1958
- SS William H. Machen sank on July 7, 1942, off New Hampshire in collision with ship Maid of Stirling a Stirling Shipping Company ship.
- SS Bylayl built in 1916

== See also ==
- Pocahontas Historic District
- Pocahontas Fuel Company Store (Maybeury, West Virginia)
- Pocahontas Fuel Company Store (Switchback, West Virginia)
- World War II United States Merchant Navy
