= Coopers, West Virginia =

- Neighborhood
- Location within West Virginia
- Coordinates: 37°19′20″N 81°19′35″W
- Country: United States
- State: West Virginia
- County: Mercer
- Elevation: 2,274 ft (693 m)
- Time zone: UTC-5 (Eastern (EST))
  - Summer (DST): UTC-4 (EDT)
- Area codes: 304 & 681
- GNIS feature ID: 1537653

Coopers is a neighborhood of Bramwell, Mercer County, West Virginia, United States. It was named after John Cooper, a figure in the local mining industry.
