= Amonate, Virginia =

- Census-designated place
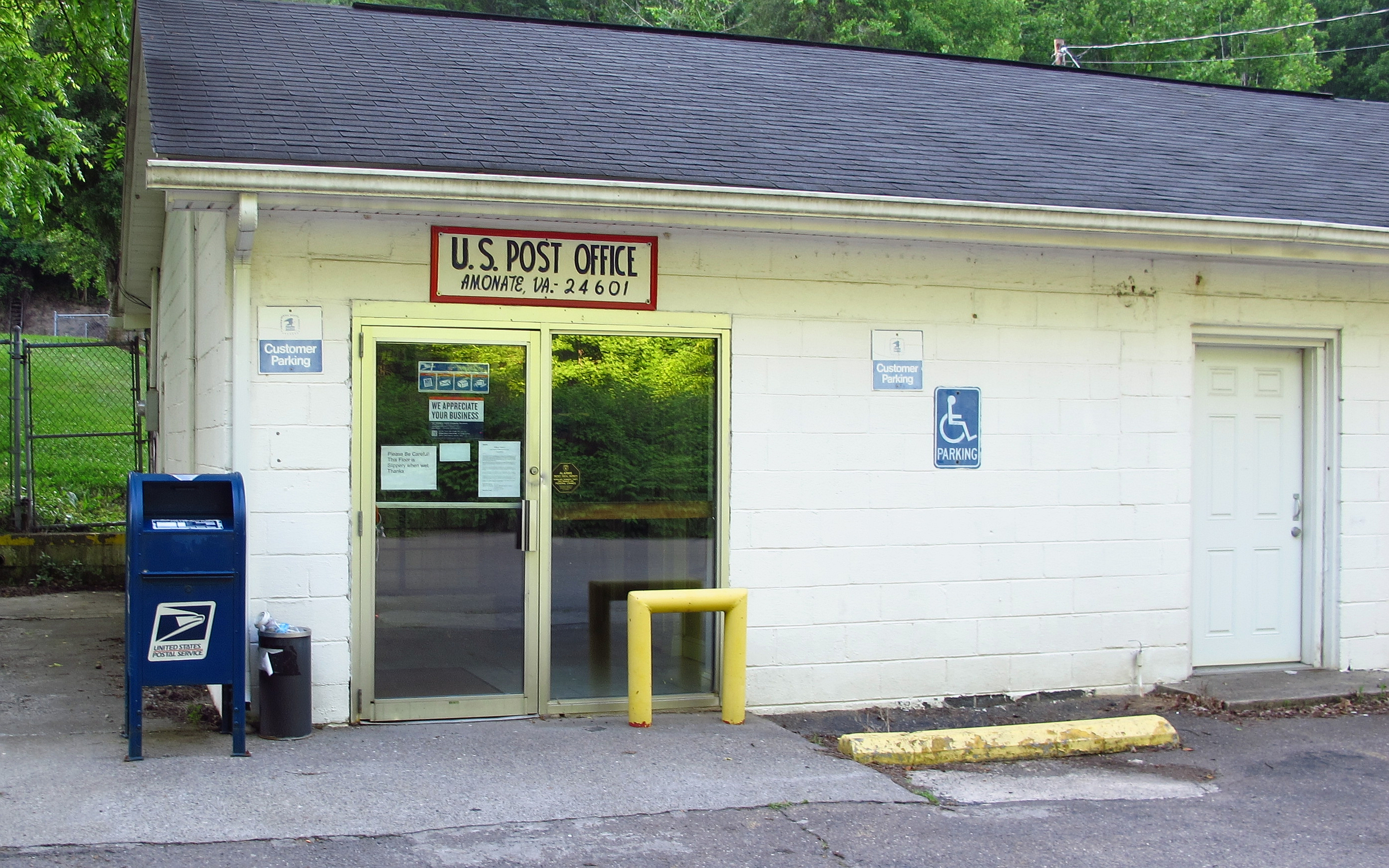
- Post Office in Amonate

- Location within Virginia Location within the United States
- Coordinates: 37°11′27″N 81°38′19″W
- Country: United States
- State: Virginia
- County: Tazewell
- Elevation: 1,736 ft (529 m)

Population (2020)
  - Total: 59
- Time zone: UTC-5 (Eastern (EST))
  - Summer (DST): UTC-4 (EDT)
- Area code: 276
- GNIS feature ID: 1492468

Amonate is an unincorporated community and census-designated place (CDP) in Tazewell County, Virginia, United States. Amonate is 8.5 miles (13.7 km) northwest of Tazewell. Its zip code is 24601. It was first listed as a CDP in the 2020 census with a population of 59.

The community was established in the early 1920s by Faraday Coal & Coke, but became a company town of Pocahontas Fuel in 1923. Its name comes from a nickname for Pocahontas.

== Demographics ==
Historical population
Census	Pop.	Note	%±
2020	59		—
U.S. Decennial Census; 2010 2020

Amonate first appeared as a census designated place in the 2020 U.S. census.

Amonate CDP, Virginia – Racial and ethnic composition Note: the US Census treats Hispanic/Latino as an ethnic category. This table excludes Latinos from the racial categories and assigns them to a separate category. Hispanics/Latinos may be of any race.
Race / Ethnicity (NH = Non-Hispanic)	Pop 2020	2020
White alone (NH)	49	83.05%
Black or African American alone (NH)	0	0.00%
Native American or Alaska Native alone (NH)	2	3.39%
Asian alone (NH)	0	0.00%
Native Hawaiian or Pacific Islander alone (NH)	0	0.00%
Other race alone (NH)	0	0.00%
Mixed race or Multiracial (NH)	4	6.78%
Hispanic or Latino (any race)	4	6.78%
Total	59	100.00%
