= Freeman, Mercer County, West Virginia =

Freeman, West Virginia
- Neighborhood
- Location within West Virginia
- Coordinates: 37°19′48″N 81°18′28″W
- Country: United States
- State: West Virginia
- County: Mercer
- Elevation: 2,247 ft (685 m)
- Time zone: UTC-5 (Eastern (EST))
  - Summer (DST): UTC-4 (EDT)
- ZIP code: 24724
- Area codes: 304 & 681
- GNIS feature ID: 1554507

Freeman is a neighborhood of Bramwell, Mercer County, West Virginia, United States. Freeman had its own post office, which closed on June 27, 2009.

The community was named after John Freeman, the proprietor of a local mine.
