= Ream, West Virginia =

Ream
- Unincorporated community
- Location within the state of West Virginia Ream (the United States)
- Coordinates: 37°20′59″N 81°32′59″W
- Country: United States
- State: West Virginia
- County: McDowell
- Elevation: 1,539 ft (469 m)
- Time zone: UTC-5 (Eastern (EST))
  - Summer (DST): UTC-4 (EDT)
- GNIS ID: 1555451

Ream is an unincorporated community in McDowell County, West Virginia, United States.
