= Jenkinjones, West Virginia =

Jenkinjones
- Unincorporated community
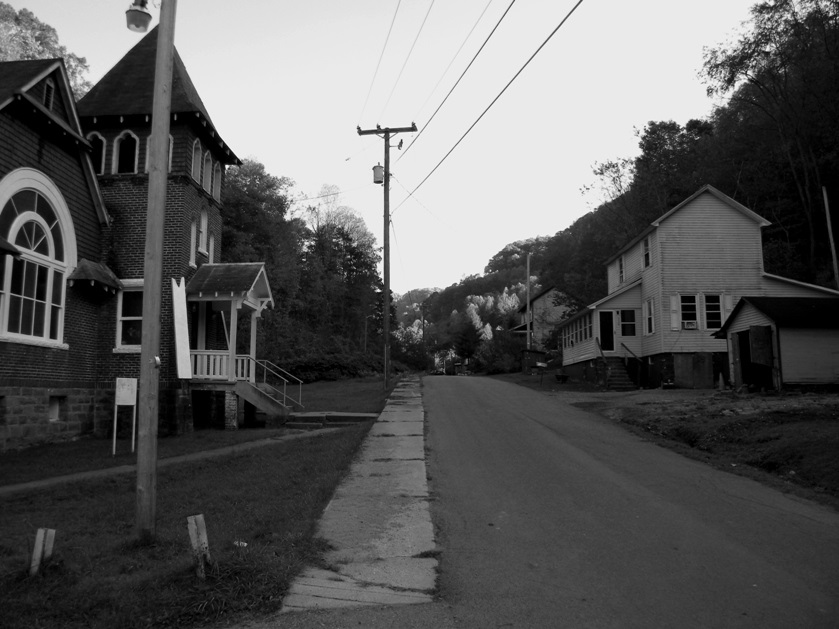
- Streets of Jenkinjones, West Virginia

- Location within the state of West Virginia Jenkinjones (the United States)
- Coordinates: 37°17′37″N 81°25′33″W
- Country: United States
- State: West Virginia
- County: McDowell
- Time zone: UTC-5 (Eastern (EST))
  - Summer (DST): UTC-4 (EDT)
- ZIP codes: 24848
- GNIS feature ID: 1554801

Jenkinjones is an unincorporated community and coal town in McDowell County, West Virginia, United States. It lies on the western flanks of Stone Ridge near the border with Tazewell County, Virginia.

== History ==
It is the location of the Pocahontas Fuel Company Store and Office Buildings which were listed on the National Register of Historic Places in 1992. Its post office was established on October 15, 1912. During the years of 1961–1975 it is documented that 8,290,780 tons of coal were mined by the Pocahontas Fuel Company in Jenkinjones.

Jenkinjones was named in 1912 for Jenkin B. Jones (1841–1916) who was born in Glynneath, Wales.

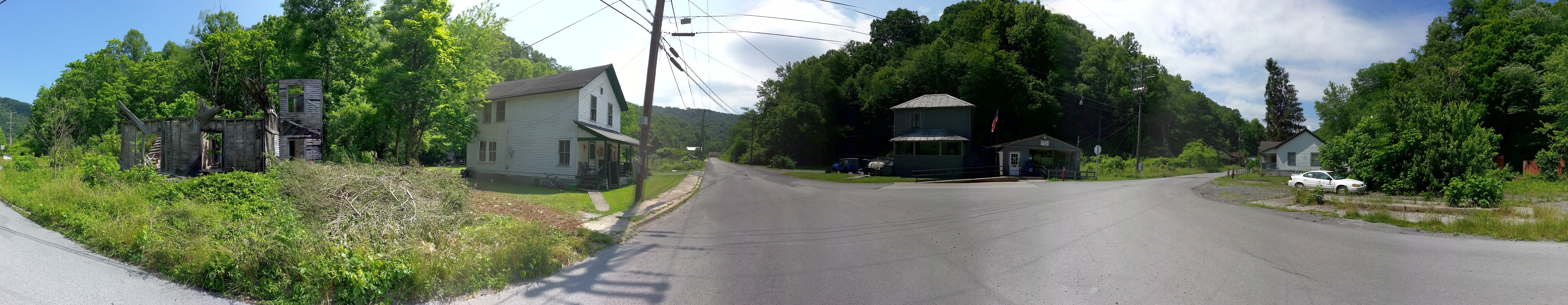
Jenkinjones
