= Bramwell, West Virginia =

- Town
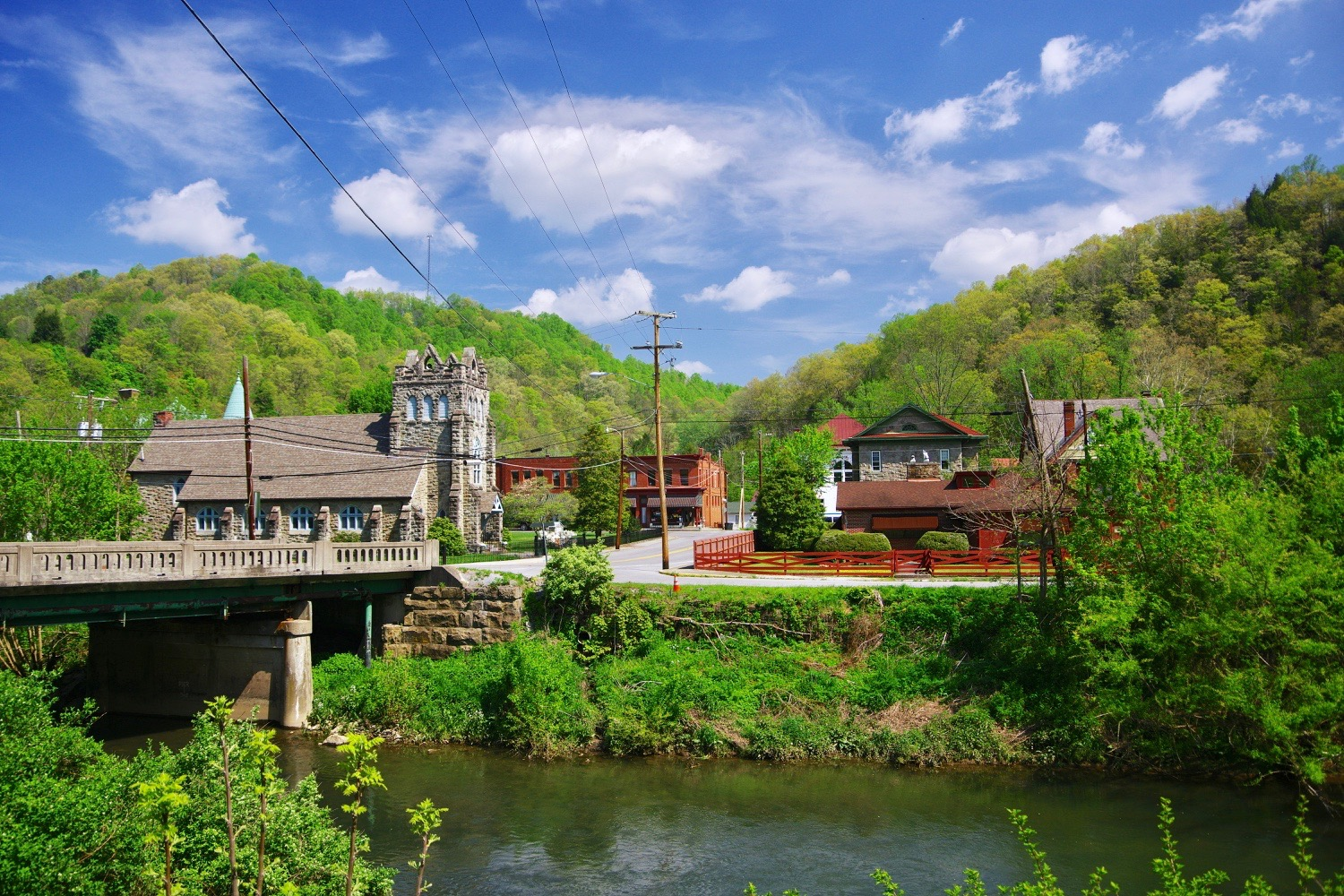
- Bramwell, with the Bluestone River in the foreground

- Location of Bramwell in Mercer County, West Virginia.
- Coordinates: 37°19′37″N 81°18′46″W
- Country: United States
- State: West Virginia
- County: Mercer
- Incorporated: 1888

Area
  - Total: 0.58 sq mi (1.51 km^{2})
  - Land: 0.56 sq mi (1.44 km^{2})
  - Water: 0.031 sq mi (0.08 km^{2})
- Elevation: 2,244 ft (684 m)

Population (2020)
  - Total: 276
  - Estimate (2021): 274
  - Density: 608/sq mi (234.6/km^{2})
- Time zone: UTC-5 (Eastern (EST))
  - Summer (DST): UTC-4 (EDT)
- ZIP code: 24715
- Area codes: 304, 681
- FIPS code: 54-09796
- GNIS feature ID: 2390747
- Website: https://www.bramwellwestva.com

Bramwell is a town in Mercer County, West Virginia, United States, along the Bluestone River. The population was 277 at the 2020 census. It is part of the Bluefield, WV-VA micropolitan area which has a population of 107,578.

== History ==
In the 1880s the region around Bramwell began to rapidly grow as a coal mining center with several coal camps operating in the area. The town of Bramwell was officially established in 1888, and was named after J.H. Bramwell, a civil engineer. In the late 1800s the town acquired some notoriety for having the largest number of millionaires per capita in the United States. Numerous large homes were built in the town by wealthy coal operators.

On January 7, 1910, part of the downtown area was destroyed by a major fire. Twenty-one buildings were burned to the ground. In 1984, the town was named to the National Register of Historic Places by the U.S. Department of the Interior. Many of the houses are early 20th century in design. There is a museum largely devoted to the local coal and train history of the area.

== Geography ==
Bramwell is situated along the Bluestone River, just east of the Virginia-West Virginia state line. U.S. Route 52 passes through the eastern part of Bramwell, connecting the town with Bluefield to the south and Northfork the northwest. Pinnacle Rock State Park lies just southeast of Bramwell.

According to the United States Census Bureau, the town has a total area of 0.59 square miles (1.53 km^{2}), of which 0.56 square miles (1.45 km^{2}) is land and 0.03 square miles (0.08 km^{2}) is water.

Bramwell is located 0.3 miles (0.5 km) from an access point to the Pocohontas Trail system, a component of the Hatfield-McCoy trails. The Hatfield-McCoy trails include over 700 miles (1127 km) of primitive roads typically utilized by dirt bikes and All-Terrain Vehicles (ATVs). These trails are managed by the Hatfield-McCoy Regional Trail Authority.

== Demographics ==
Historical population
Census	Pop.	Note	%±
1890	499		—
1900	825		65.3%
1910	1,458		76.7%
1920	1,690		15.9%
1930	1,574		−6.9%
1940	1,494		−5.1%
1950	1,587		6.2%
1960	1,195		−24.7%
1970	1,125		−5.9%
1980	989		−12.1%
1990	620		−37.3%
2000	426		−31.3%
2010	364		−14.6%
2020	276		−24.2%
2021 (est.)	274	▼	−0.7%
U.S. Decennial Census

=== 2010 census ===
As of the census of 2010, there were 364 people, 164 households, and 105 families living in the town. The population density was 650.0 inhabitants per square mile (251.0/km^{2}). There were 214 housing units at an average density of 382.1 per square mile (147.5/km^{2}). The racial makeup of the town was 96.4% White, 3.3% African American, and 0.3% from two or more races. Hispanic or Latino of any race were 0.3% of the population.

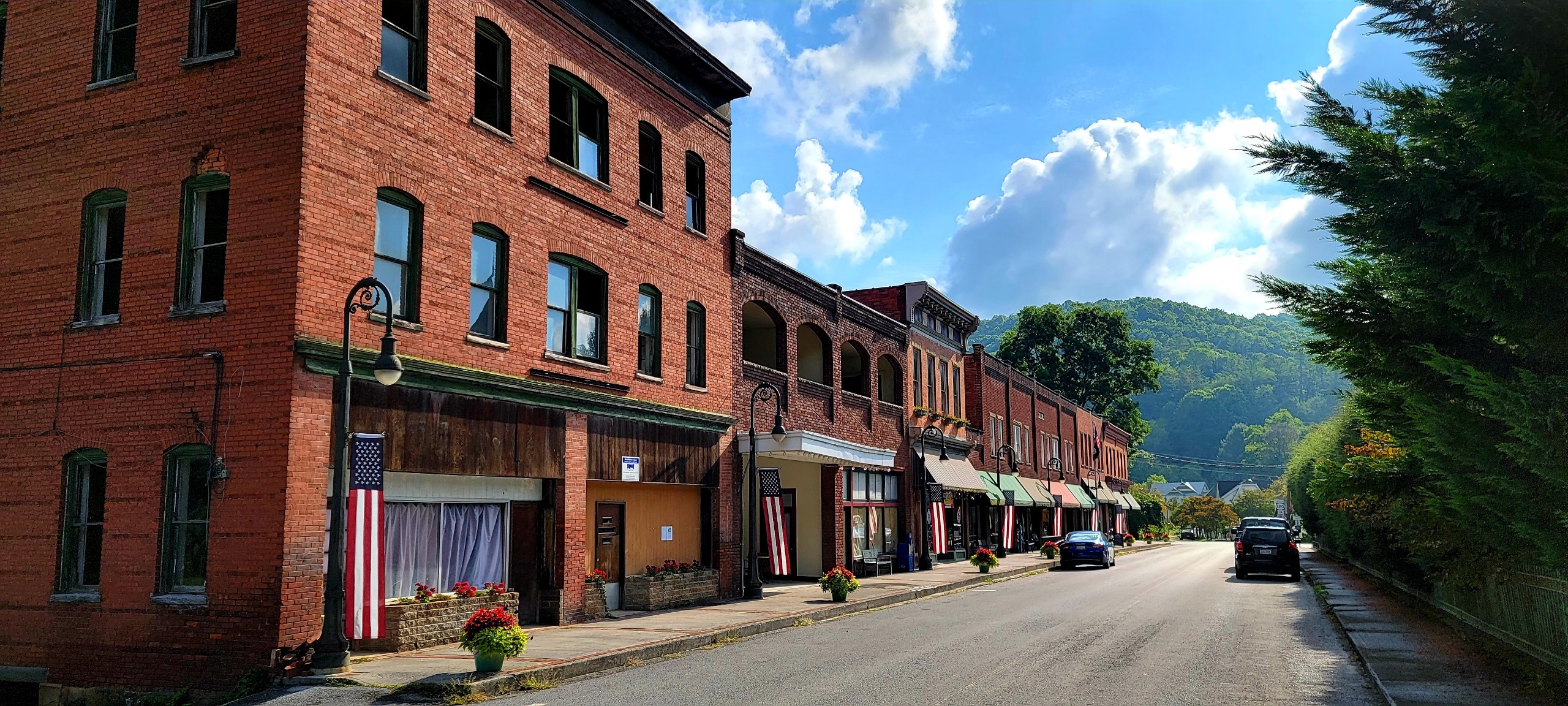
Bramwell Main Street

There were 164 households, of which 23.2% had children under the age of 18 living with them, 45.1% were married couples living together, 15.2% had a female householder with no husband present, 3.7% had a male householder with no wife present, and 36.0% were non-families. 31.7% of all households were made up of individuals, and 23.8% had someone living alone who was 65 years of age or older. The average household size was 2.22 and the average family size was 2.72.

The median age in the town was 49.7 years. 16.2% of residents were under the age of 18; 6.5% were between the ages of 18 and 24; 22.5% were from 25 to 44; 31.5% were from 45 to 64; and 23.1% were 65 years of age or older. The gender makeup of the town was 47.3% male and 52.7% female.

=== 2000 census ===
As of the census of 2000, there were 426 people, 189 households, and 120 families living in the town. The population density was 712.5 inhabitants per square mile (274.1/km^{2}). There were 237 housing units at an average density of 396.4 per square mile (152.5/km^{2}). The racial makeup of the town was 89.67% White, 9.86% African American, and 0.47% from two or more races. Hispanic or Latino of any race were 0.47% of the population.

There were 189 households, out of which 16.4% had children under the age of 18 living with them, 44.4% were married couples living together, 14.8% had a female householder with no husband present, and 36.0% were non-families. 33.9% of all households were made up of individuals, and 19.6% had someone living alone who was 65 years of age or older. The average household size was 2.25 and the average family size was 2.88.

In the town, the population was spread out, with 17.1% under the age of 18, 8.5% from 18 to 24, 21.6% from 25 to 44, 29.1% from 45 to 64, and 23.7% who were 65 years of age or older. The median age was 47 years. For every 100 females, there were 86.8 males. For every 100 females age 18 and over, there were 82.0 males.

The median income for a household in the town was $21,979, and the median income for a family was $32,396. Males had a median income of $22,159 versus $15,250 for females. The per capita income for the town was $13,410. About 9.9% of families and 15.7% of the population were below the poverty line, including 26.8% of those under age 18 and 16.5% of those age 65 or over.

== See also ==
- Freeman, Mercer County, West Virginia
