= Company store =

Store selling almost exclusively to employees of a specific company

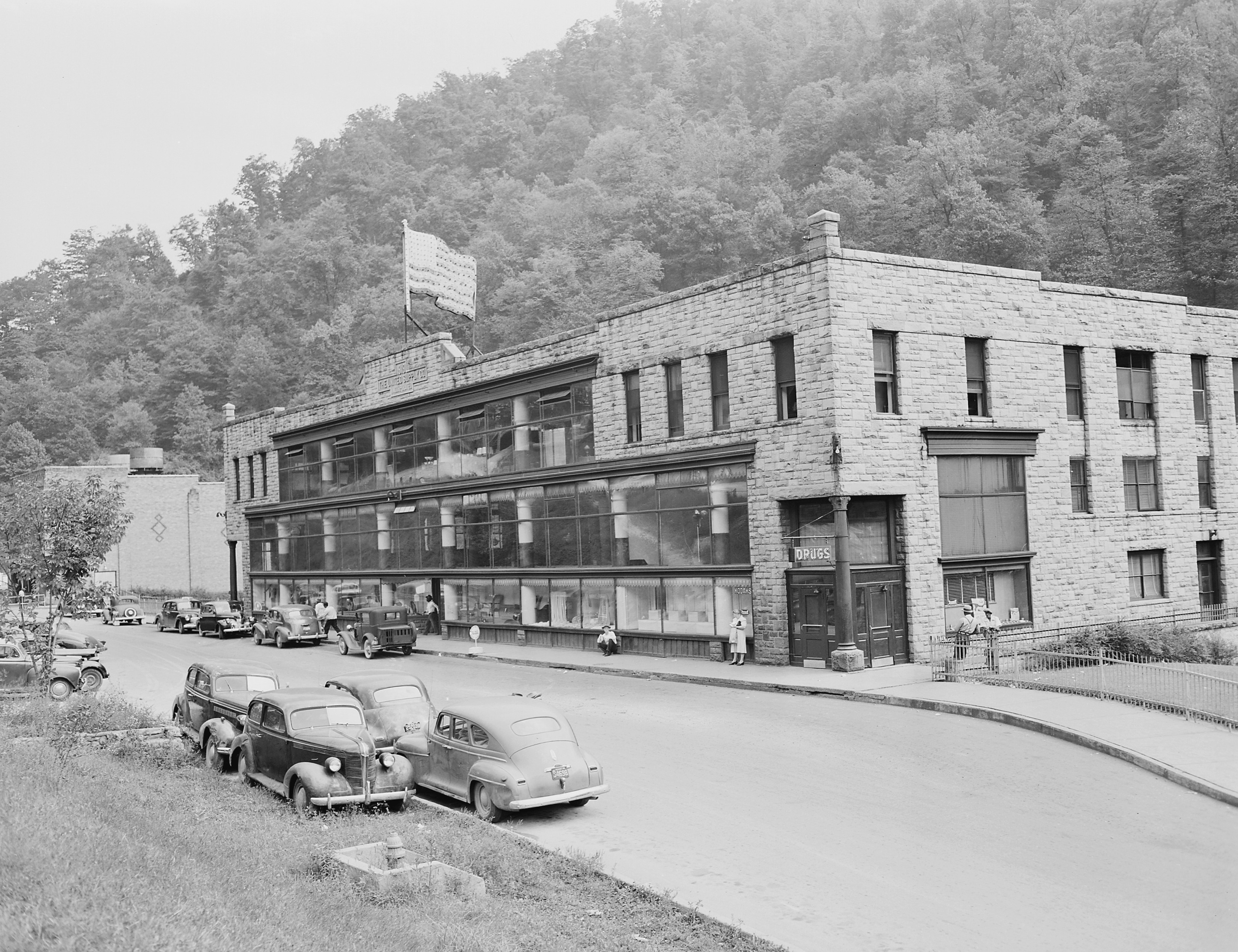
A company store owned and operated by the U.S. Coal and Coke Company in Lynch, Kentucky, 1946

A company store is a retail store selling a limited range of food, clothing and daily necessities to employees of a company. It is typical of a company town in a remote area where virtually everyone is employed by one firm, such as a coal mine. In a company town, the housing is owned by the company but there may be independent stores there or nearby.

Employee-only company stores often accept scrip or non-cash vouchers issued by the company in advance of periodic cash paychecks, and gives credit to employees before payday. Except in very remote areas, company stores in mining towns became scarcer after the miners bought automobiles and could travel to a range of stores. Even so, the stores could survive because they provided convenience and easy credit. Company stores served numerous additional functions, as well, such as a locus for the government post office, and as the cultural and community center where people could freely gather.

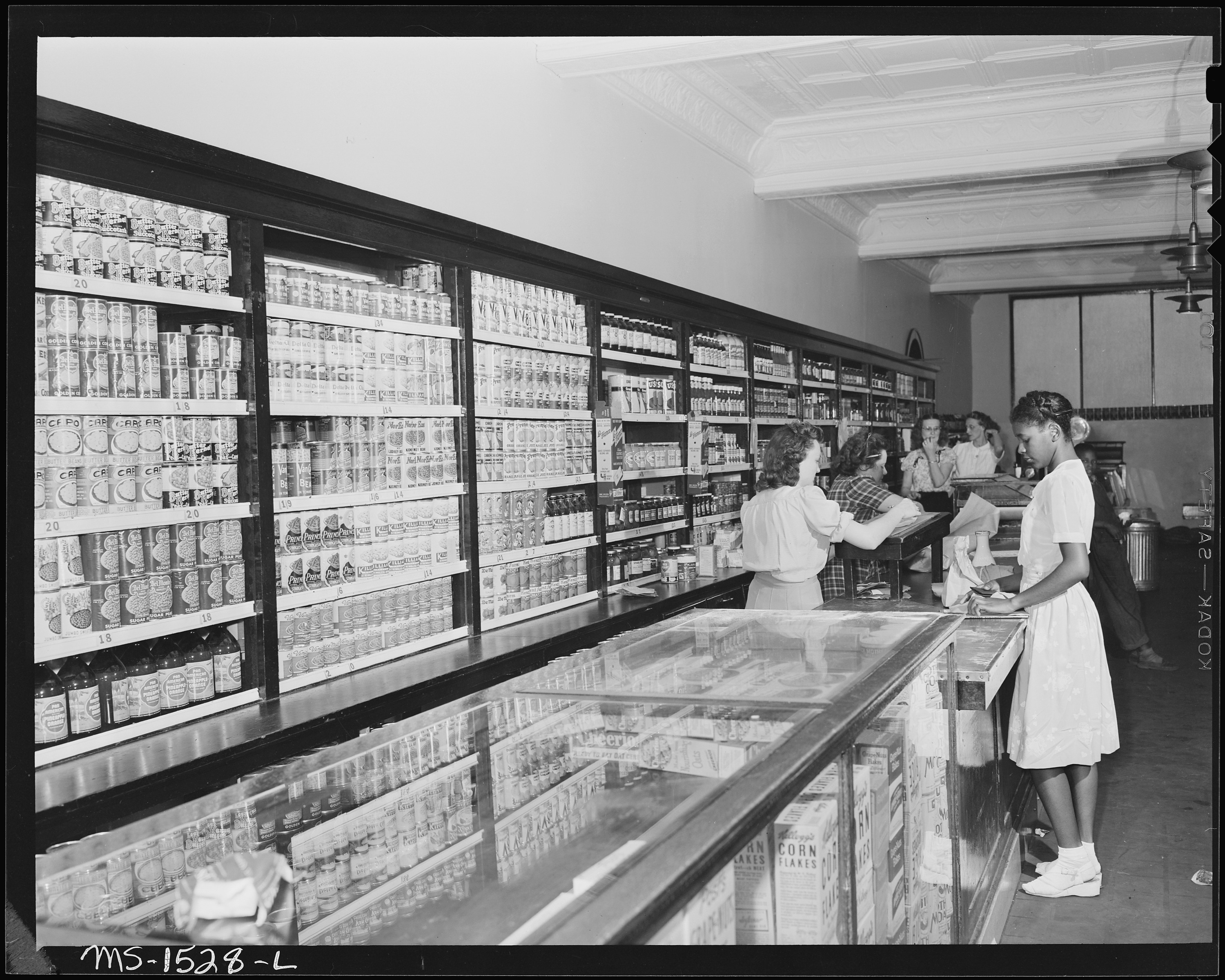
U.S. Coal and Coke Company Store in 1946, Gary, West Virginia

Company stores were monopolistic institutions, funneling workers' incomes back to the owners of the company. This is because company stores often faced little or no competition for workers' earnings on account of their geographical remoteness, the inability and/or unwillingness of other nearby merchants (if any existed) to accept company scrip, or both. Prices, therefore, were typically high. Allowing purchases on credit enforced a kind of debt slavery, obligating employees to remain with the company until the debt was cleared.

Regarding this reputation, economic historian Price V. Fishback wrote:

"The company store is one of the most reviled and misunderstood of economic institutions. In song, folktale, and union rhetoric the company store was often cast as a villain, a collector of souls through perpetual debt peonage. Nicknames, like the "pluck me" and more obscene versions that cannot appear in a family newspaper, seem to point to exploitation. The attitudes carry over into the scholarly literature, which emphasizes that the company store was a monopoly."

The songs Fishback mentions include the popular song "Sixteen Tons", which contains such lines as "Saint Peter, don't you call me, 'cuz I can't go. I owe my soul to the company store."

== Company stores outside the United States ==
=== Mexico ===
In Mexico, during the Porfiriato period (late 1800 to early 1900), the "tiendas de raya" (company stores) were a prominent symbol of labor and peasant exploitation. These stores, operated by the owners of haciendas or factories, sold essential items to workers, often at inflated prices and typically paying with vouchers instead of cash. This kept workers in a continuous debt cycle to the hacienda or company, binding them almost like slaves to the land or industrial work without the possibility of escaping poverty.

A notable instance of the oppressive nature of tiendas de raya occurred in the early 1900s at Río Blanco, Veracruz, home to Mexico's largest cotton mill. Workers there were paid in scrip, which could only be used at the company's store. In 1907, textile workers, fed up with this system, went on labor strike and attacked and looted the company store. The Mexican military responded harshly, gunning down many of the strikers. Despite the tragic violence, the aftermath saw the opening of more retail outlets in Río Blanco, as if to reinforce the tienda de raya system.

From the earliest insurrections of the Mexican revolution, led and promoted by the Mexican Liberal Party, the looting and destruction of the tiendas de raya became key symbolic and strategic actions. With the actual outbreak of the Mexican Revolution in 1910, this resentment intensified. The deep social discontent, built up after years of exploitation, was primarily directed towards these stores and their managers.

Finally, in 1915, Venustiano Carranza, one of the revolutionary leaders and eventual president of Mexico, took decisive action against this oppressive system. By his order, the tiendas de raya were eliminated across the country, marking a significant shift in the fight for social and economic justice. This act was intended not only to relieve the direct economic exploitation of workers but also to break down the economic power that large landowners and businessmen held over the working class.

=== Hawaii ===
Possibly the first company store in the world was in Hawaii. William Northey Hooper started Hawaiiʻs first sugar plantation in 1835 at Kōloa, on the island of Kauaʻi. He hired 23 Hawaiian locals and paid them in a cardboard scrip, notated in various amounts. The scrip could only be exchanged for merchandise at his store.

== See also ==
- Clawback
- General store
- History of coal miners
- Truck system
- Company scrip
