= Sky of Stone =

Book by Homer Hickam

First edition (publ. Delacorte Press)

Sky of Stone is a memoir by Homer Hickam about his hometown of Coalwood, West Virginia, the third in a trilogy that began with Rocket Boys and continued with The Coalwood Way.

The book was published by Delacorte Press in October 2001, with a mass-market paperback edition from Dell in October 2002.

== Plot ==
In Sky of Stone, Hickam has gone off to college at Virginia Polytechnic Institute. His mother, who is living separated from her husband in Myrtle Beach, contacts him and asks him to return home to Coalwood to help his father. He arrives to find his father, the mine superintendent, is being investigated by the coal company because of a fatal mining accident. After wrecking the family car the young Hickam needs to pay for the repairs, and he takes a job in the coal mine for the summer in a program set up by the United Mine Workers of America for college students. His father, who, although he wanted to see his son grow up to be a mining engineer, is fervently anti-union, and his mother, who swore her sons would never work in a coal mine, are both against this. He defies the wishes of his parents to take the job. His father in response cuts off his college funds.

A female mining engineer, Rita, is in town, as it is the standard practice of the parent company to send new engineers to gain experience working in the mine. Due to superstition ingrained in local custom, she is not allowed in the mine unlike the male engineers. She vows to be the first woman in the mine, and tries to get young Hickam to sneak her in one night, however they are caught and this fails. Rita later unveils a plan to replace all the track inside the mine. Two teams will work from opposite ends of the mine replacing track, one from Coalwood and the other from an adjoining mine in Caretta. Homer Hickam, Jr. is one of three people working on the Coalwood team, which is led by a devout Pentecostal Christian, Johnny Basso. The work becomes a race and a contest between the two teams, with the other miners placing bets on whether Coalwood or Caretta will win.

As the race goes on over the summer, so does the investigation of Hickam Sr. As the investigation unfolds, more mysteries are revealed, including the identity of a disabled worker still secretly on the coal mine's payroll, and the fate of the Hickam family's pet fox 'Parkyacarcass'. In the end, Hickam Sr. is cleared, the Hickam family is reunited, and Rita is allowed in the mine, but the Coalwood team loses the contest by a hair.

== See also ==
- October Sky - the film shows him dropping out of high school to work in the mine, which didn't actually happen. That part of the film does use material from when he later worked in the mine as depicted in Sky of Stone, such as the line "turn your light on, boy".
