= Carter Coal Company Store =

Carter Coal Company Store may refer to:

- Carter Coal Company Store (Caretta, West Virginia), listed on the National Register of Historic Places (NRHP) in West Virginia
- Carter Coal Company Store (Coalwood, West Virginia), listed on the NRHP in West Virginia
