= Caretta, West Virginia =

Unincorporated community in West Virginia, United States

Caretta
- Unincorporated community
- Location within the state of West Virginia Caretta (the United States)
- Coordinates: 37°20′8″N 81°40′22″W
- Country: United States
- State: West Virginia
- County: McDowell
- Time zone: UTC-5 (Eastern (EST))
  - Summer (DST): UTC-4 (EDT)
- ZIP codes: 24821
- GNIS feature ID: 1554071

Caretta is an unincorporated community located in McDowell County, West Virginia, United States. Caretta was named for the transposed syllables in the name of Mrs. Etta Carter, the wife of George Lafayette Carter. It is the only place in the United States with this name.

This coal town was originally owned first by The Virginia Pocahontas Coal Company, then by the Carter Coal Company, and the final operators in Caretta were the Consolidation Coal Company.

Caretta's coal mine was connected to the mine in nearby Coalwood, made famous in the book Rocket Boys.

The Carter Coal Company Store was listed on the National Register of Historic Places in 1992.
