= Coalwood, West Virginia =

Unincorporated community in West Virginia, United States

- Unincorporated community
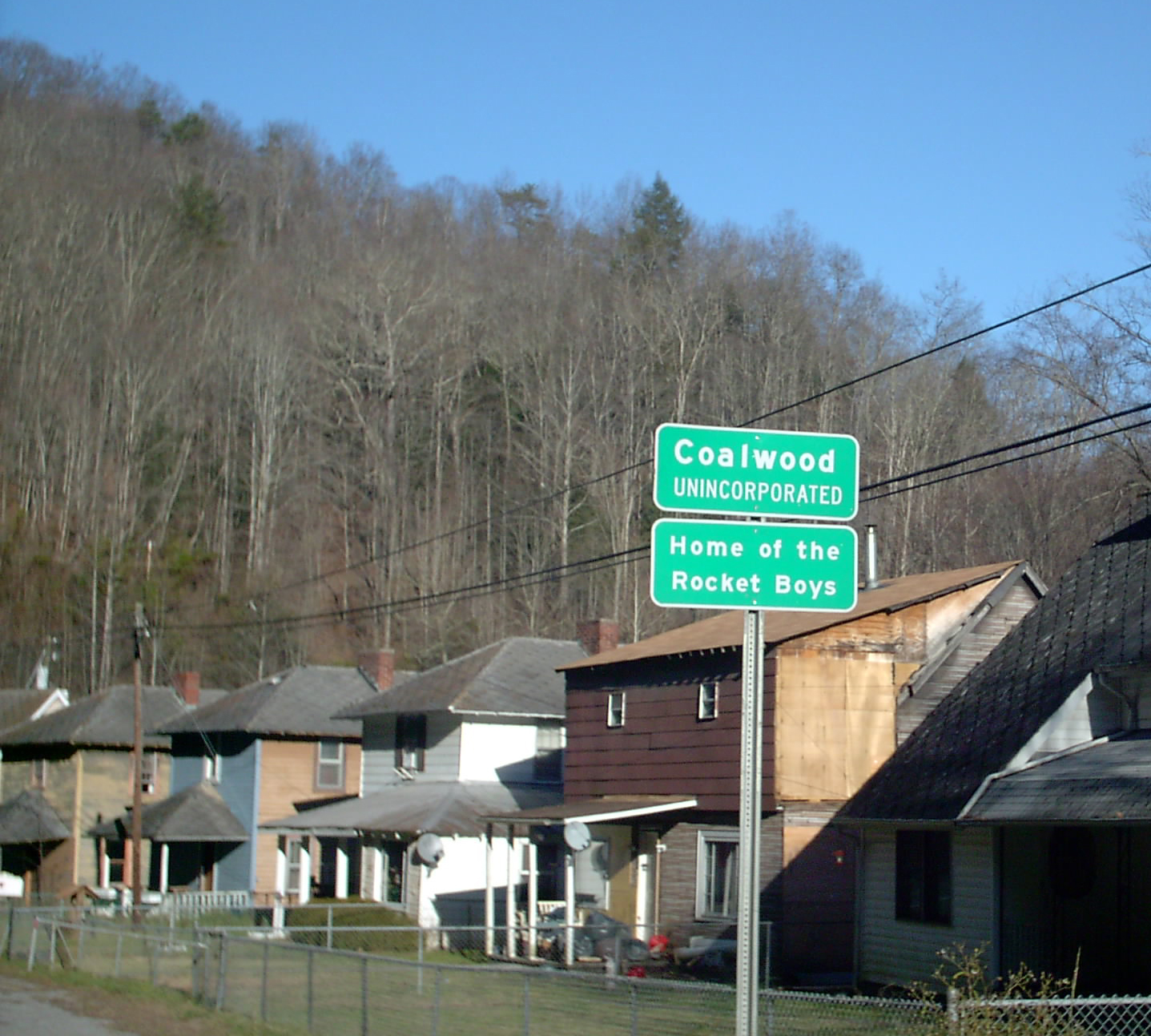

- Location of Coalwood, West Virginia
- Coordinates: 37°23′14″N 81°39′09″W
- Country: United States
- State: West Virginia
- County: McDowell
- Founded: 1905
- Elevation: 1,450 ft (442 m)
- Time zone: UTC-5 (Eastern (EST))
  - Summer (DST): UTC-4 (EDT)
- ZIP code: 24824
- Area code: 304
- GNIS feature ID: 1554166

Coalwood is an unincorporated coal town in McDowell County, West Virginia, United States. The coal mine in Coalwood reached its peak in the 1950s and ceased production on October 1, 1986. The population was 900 in the 1990 census, the last time the town was counted separately. It was the setting of Homer Hickam's best-selling 1998 memoir Rocket Boys, as well as its 1999 film adaptation, October Sky.

== History ==
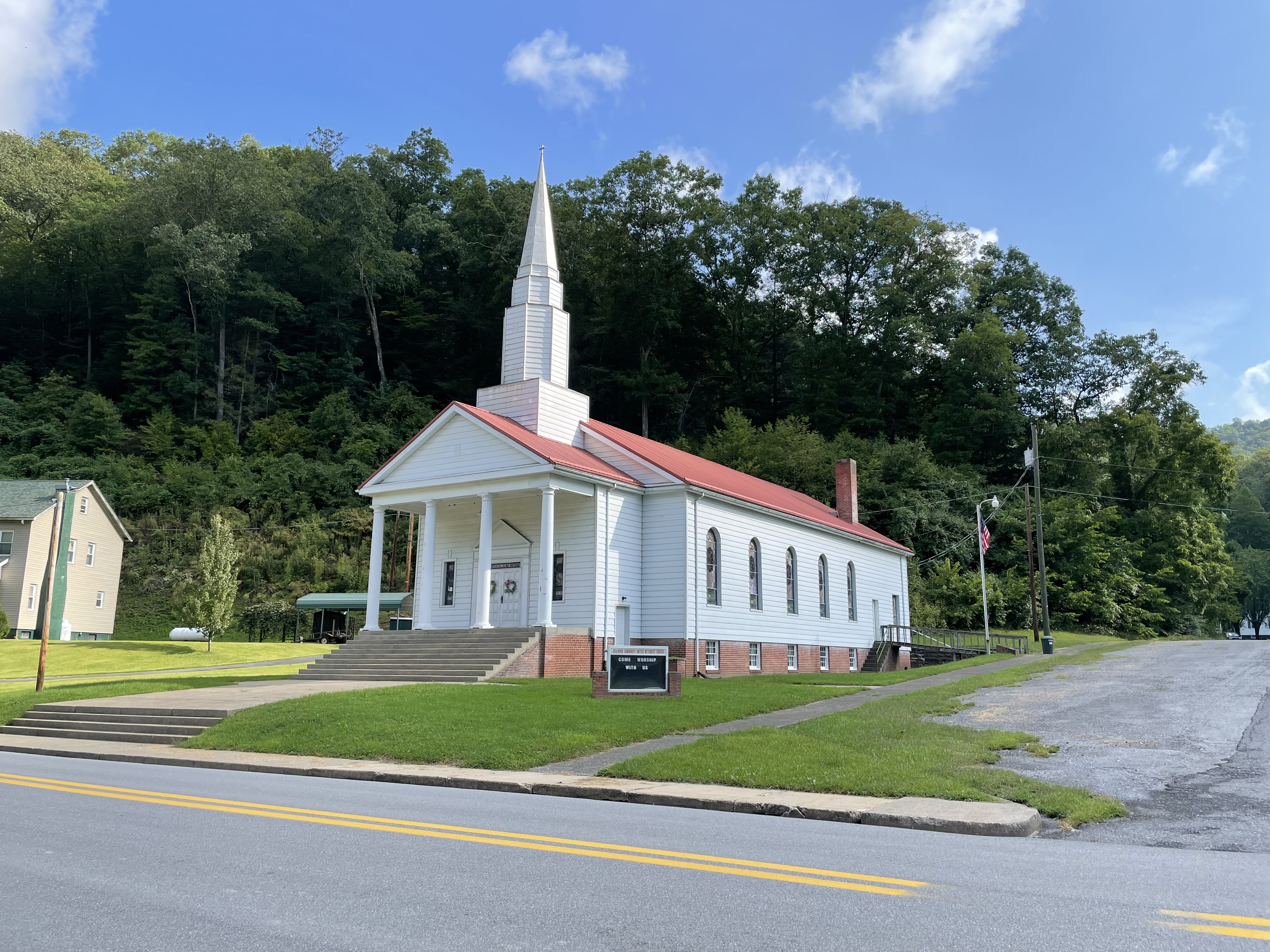
The Coalwood Community Church in McDowell County

Coalwood was founded by George Lafayette Carter in 1905. He came on the back of a mule and eventually found rich seams of coal, and bought 20,000 acres (80 km^{2}). He constructed a mine, calling it the Carter Coal Company and built offices, houses, a schoolhouse, the Carter Coal Company Store, a church and more. Carter hired a dentist and doctor to provide service to his miners.

Carter sold the mine and properties within the town to the Consolidation Coal Company in 1922. The company rebuilt the community and recruited new employees to work in the mines, but Carter regained the company when Consolidation Coal defaulted on its payments in 1933. He died in 1936, and the company was then taken over by his son, James, who sold it in 1947 to a group of industrialists who changed the company name to the Olga Coal Company.

The Coalwood mine was connected underground to the nearby Caretta mine in 1956 which was also owned by Olga. In 1959, Olga ceased bringing coal to the surface via Coalwood which prompted the Norfolk and Western Railway to begin pulling up the tracks leading to and from Coalwood. The Coalwood-Caretta mine continued to be productive throughout most of the 20th century, producing on average one million tons annually until the mine was finally closed. At its peak, Coalwood had a population of over 2,000.

The Olga Coal Company was bought by the LTV Corporation in 1980 which closed the mine in 1986. Much of Coalwood has been abandoned as of 2019, including Big Creek High School. The buildings of the town still stand, although time and the elements have taken their toll. A primary school has been built at the former site of Big Creek High School.

== October Sky Festival ==
Once a year, in October, Coalwood hosted an October Sky festival in honor of the accomplishments of the Rocket Boys. Many scientists and astronauts attended and Homer Hickam always made an appearance. The 2007 festival also represented the 50th anniversary of Sputnik, the first artificial satellite to go into orbit around the Earth. Commemorating both events, an actor from the movie October Sky, Scott Miles, attended the festival to sign autographs.

The Cape Coalwood Restoration Association announced in February 2012 that the 2011 festival, which was its thirteenth, had been the last October Sky Festival. After that, Hickam was approached by a group of Raleigh County citizens to inquire to the possibility of bringing the festival to their city. After weeks of conversations between the parties, it was agreed that the 2012 Rocket Boys/October Sky Festival would be held in Beckley with many events taking place on the grounds of the Exhibition Coal Mine at New River Park on October 5–7. The Rocket Boys Festival remained an annual event in Beckley until the 2020 festival was cancelled due to the coronavirus shutdowns.

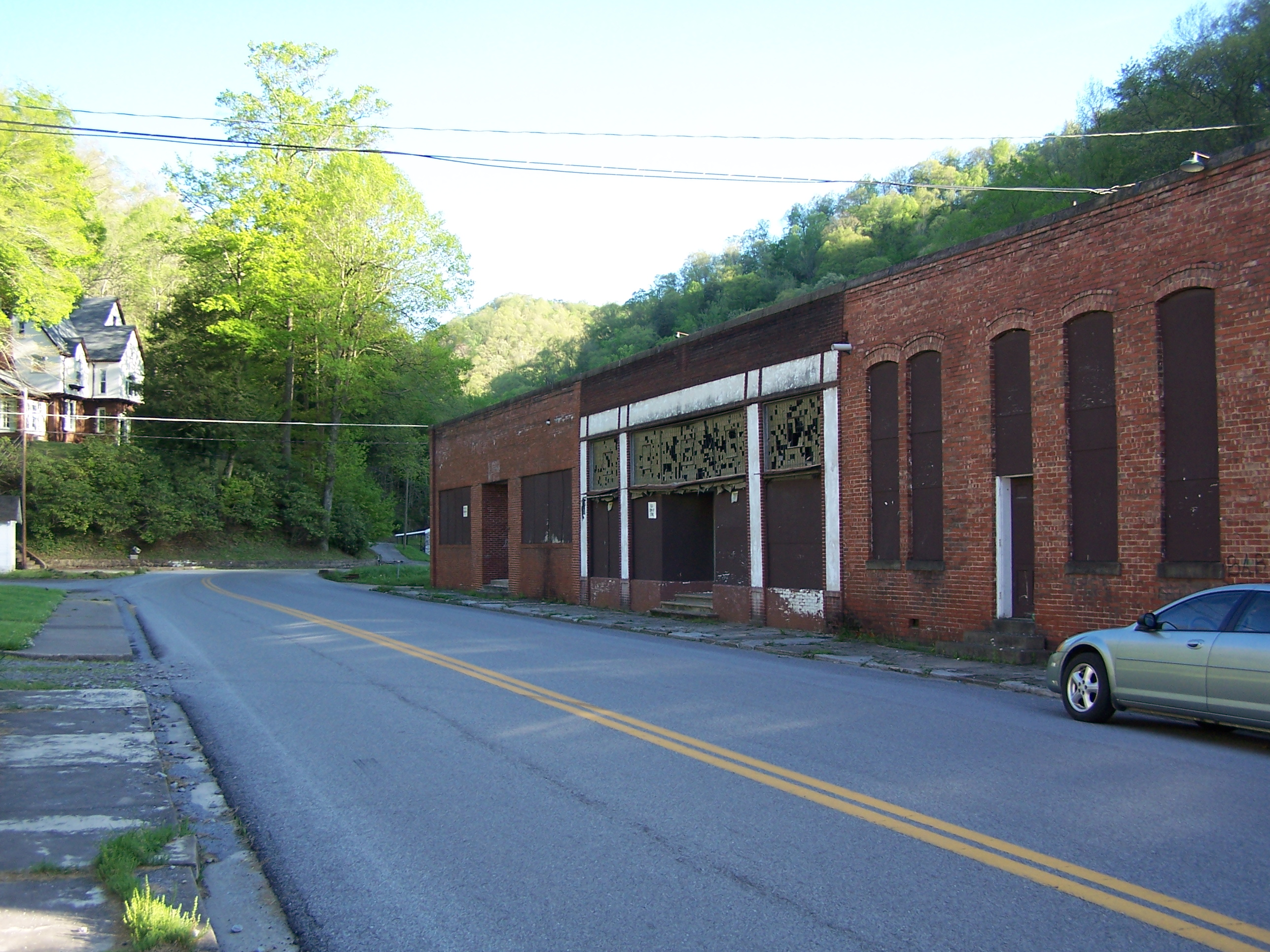
Carter Coal Company Store in 2007

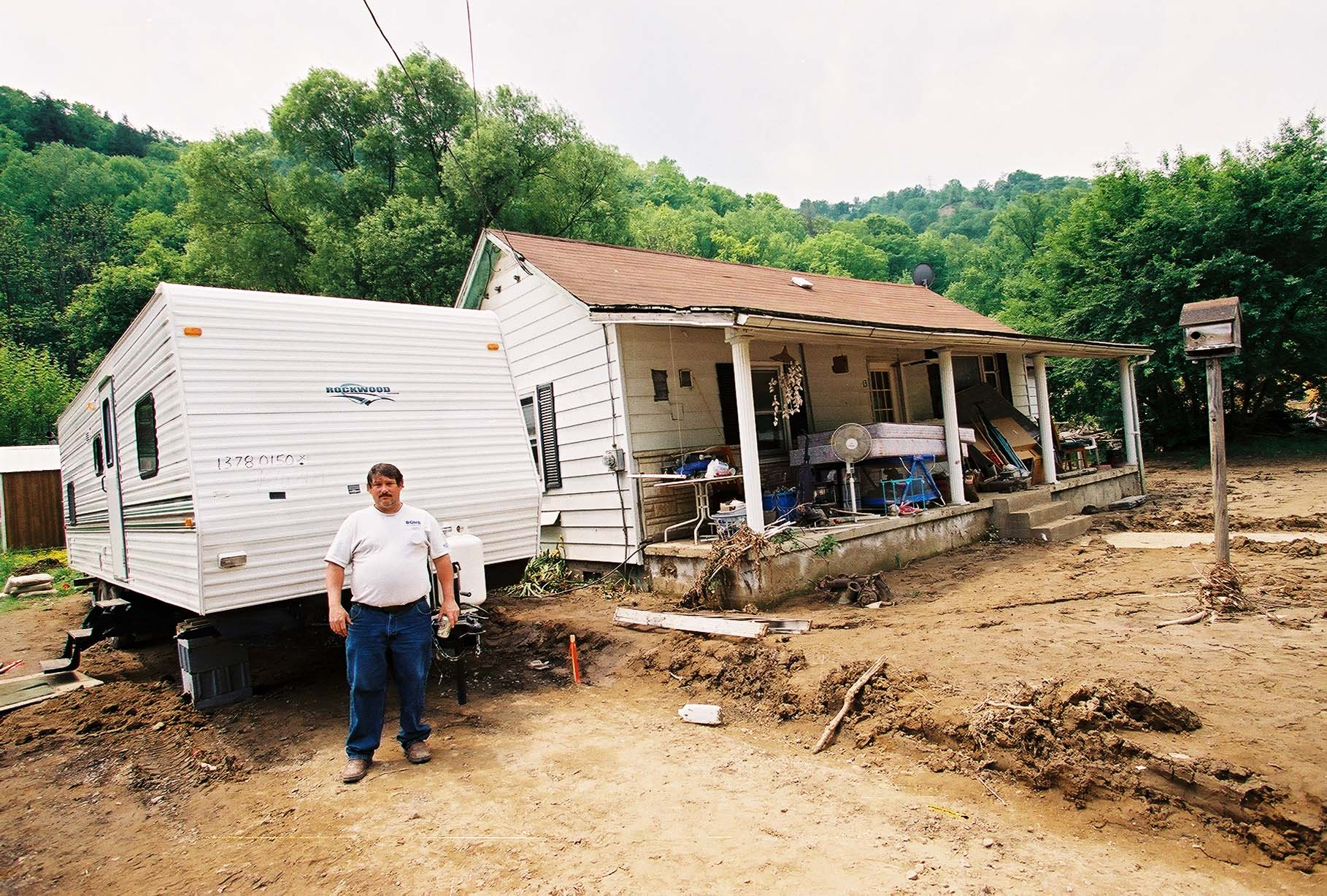
Flood damage in 2002

Hickam and Roy Lee Cooke started a new festival called Rocket Fest at Pipestem Resort State Park in 2025.
