= Homer Hickam =

American author and engineer (born 1943)

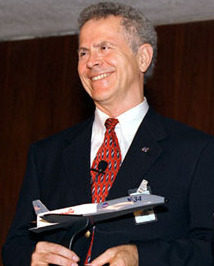
- Hickam in 1999
- Born: Homer Hadley Hickam Jr. February 19, 1943 (age 83); Coalwood, West Virginia, U.S.
- Education: Virginia Tech (BS)
- Occupations: Author; aerospace engineer
- Spouse(s): Linda Terry Hickam; Paula Morgan (div. 1986)
- Relatives: Homer Hickam Sr. (father); Elsie Hickam (mother); Jim Hickam (brother)
- Writing career
- Genres: Memoirs, historical fiction
- Notable works: Rocket Boys: A Memoir; Torpedo Junction; Back to the Moon; The Josh Thurlow series The Coalwood Way; Sky of Stone; Red Helmet; We Are Not Afraid
- Notable awards: NASA Space Camp Hall of Fame (inducted 2025)
- Military career
- Branch: U.S. Army
- Service years: 1964–1970
- Rank: Captain (US)
- Unit: Fourth Infantry Division
- Conflicts: Vietnam War
- Awards: Bronze Star Medal; Army Commendation Medal
- Website: homerhickam.com

Homer Hadley Hickam Jr. (born February 19, 1943) is an American author, Vietnam War veteran, and a former NASA engineer who trained the first Japanese astronauts. His 1998 memoir Rocket Boys (also published as October Sky) was a New York Times Best Seller and was the basis for the 1999 film October Sky. Hickam's body of written work also includes several additional best-selling memoirs and novels, including the "Josh Thurlow" historical fiction novels, his 2015 best-selling Carrying Albert Home: The Somewhat True Story of a Man, his Wife, and her Alligator and in 2021 the sequel to Rocket Boys titled Don't Blow Yourself Up: The Further Adventures and Travails of the Rocket Boy of October Sky. His books have been translated into many languages.

== Early life and education ==
Homer Hadley Hickam Jr. is the second son of Homer Sr. and Elsie Gardener Hickam (née Lavender). He was born and raised in Coalwood, West Virginia, and graduated from Big Creek High School in 1960. He and friends Roy Lee Cooke (born December 25, 1941), Sherman Siers (June 15, 1942 – September 11, 1976), Jimmy O'Dell Carroll (born June 30, 1942), Willie "Billy" Rose (born February 17, 1942), and Quentin Wilson (November 21, 1942 – August 30, 2019) became amateur rocket builders and called themselves The Big Creek Missile Agency (BCMA). After many generations of designs, they qualified for the 1960 National Science Fair and won a gold and silver medal in the area of propulsion.

=== Virginia Tech and Skipper ===
Hickam attended Virginia Tech in 1960 and joined the school's Corps of Cadets. In his junior year, he and a few classmates designed a cannon for football games and school functions. They named the cannon "Skipper" in honor of President John F. Kennedy. Skipper was cast out of brass collected from the cadets (and some from Coalwood, collected and donated by Homer's father) and has become an icon for Virginia Tech. Hickam graduated in 1964 with a Bachelor of Science degree in industrial engineering.

== Career ==
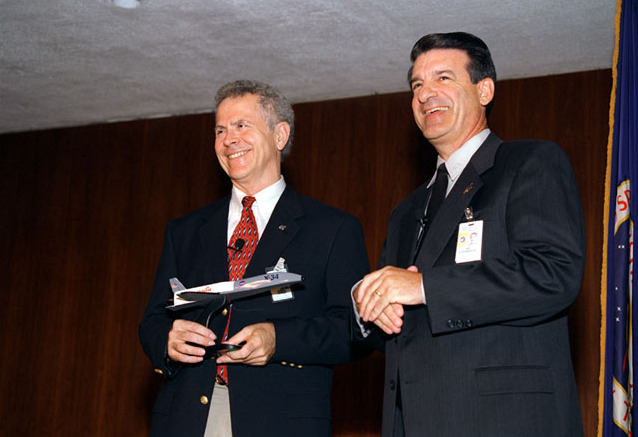
Homer Hickam Jr. (left) and Marshall Space Flight Center (MSFC) Director Art Stephenson during a conference at Morris Auditorium on July 16, 1999

=== Military service (1964–1970) ===
Hickam served six years in the U.S. Army and was honorably discharged at the rank of captain in 1970. He served in the Vietnam War in 1967 and 1968 as a first lieutenant and combat engineer with C Company, 704th Maintenance Battalion, 4th Infantry Division. He was awarded the Bronze Star Medal, Army Commendation Medal, and Army Meritorious Unit Commendation ribbon.

=== USAAMC and NASA (1971–1998) ===
Following his separation from the service, Hickam worked as an engineer for the United States Army Aviation and Missile Command from 1971 to 1978, assigned to Huntsville. Between 1978 and 1981, he was an engineer for the 7th Army Training Command in Germany.

Hickam began employment with the National Aeronautics and Space Administration at Marshall Space Flight Center in 1981 as an aerospace engineer. His specialties included training astronauts in regard to science payloads and extra-vehicular activities (EVA). Additionally, Hickam assisted at the Neutral Buoyancy Simulator as a diver where astronaut crews trained for numerous Spacelab and Space Shuttle missions, including the Hubble Space Telescope deployment, the first two Hubble repair missions, Spacelab-J (with the first Japanese astronauts), and the Solar Max repair mission. Prior to his retirement from NASA in 1998, Hickam was the payload training manager for the International Space Station program.

Cover of Hickam's book, "Rocket Boys" Published in 1998.

=== Literary career (1969–present) ===
Hickam began writing in 1969 after returning from serving in the Vietnam War. His first writings were magazine stories about scuba diving and his time as a scuba instructor. Then, having dived in many of the wrecks involved, he wrote about the battle against the U-boats along the American east coast during World War II. This resulted in his first book, Torpedo Junction, a military history published in 1989 by the Naval Institute Press.

His second book, the memoir Rocket Boys, started as an article "The Big Creek Missile Agency" in Air and Space magazine. In 1998 Delacorte Press published an expanded version of the memoir as a book, the story of his life as the son of a coal miner in Coalwood, West Virginia. Rocket Boys has since been translated into numerous languages and released as an audiobook and electronic book. Among its many honors, it was selected by The New York Times as one of its "Great Books of 1998" and was an alternate "Book-of-the-Month" selection for both the Literary Guild and the Book of the Month Club. Rocket Boys was also nominated by the National Book Critics Circle as Best Biography of 1998. In February 1999, Universal Studios released its critically acclaimed film October Sky, based on Rocket Boys (The title "October Sky" is an anagram of "Rocket Boys"). In an interview, Hickam said of the movie that "I'm proud of the film [Director] Joe Johnston and [Producer] Chuck Gordon made. It has done a great job of encouraging young people to go after their dreams." He has since co-written a musical play entitled Rocket Boys the Musical, which, according to Homer Hickam, tells a story closer to the one in his book.

Hickam's first fiction novel was Back to the Moon (1999), which was released as a hardcover, audiobook, and eBook. It has also been translated into Chinese. It is a techno-thriller and a romantic novel, telling the story of a team of "spacejackers" who commandeer a space shuttle.

The Coalwood Way, a memoir of Hickam's hometown, was published a year later by Delacorte Press and is referred to by Hickam as "not a sequel but an equal". His third Coalwood memoir, a true sequel, was published in October 2001. It is entitled Sky of Stone. One more book about Coalwood was published in 2002, a self-help/inspirational tome entitled We Are Not Afraid: Strength and Courage from the Town That Inspired the #1 Bestseller and Award-Winning Movie October Sky.

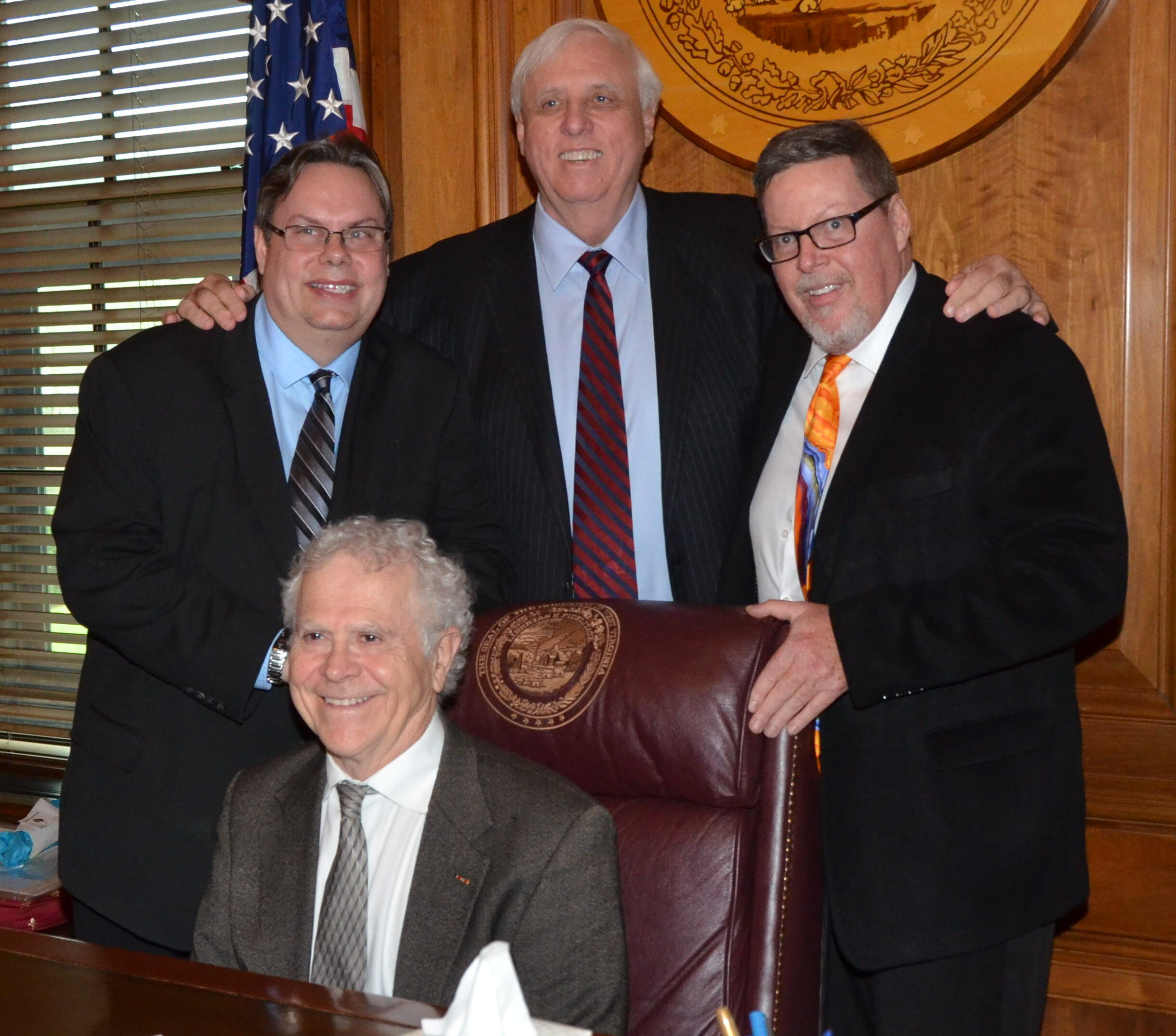
Hickam (seated) in West Virginia governor Jim Justice's office, 2017

After his memoir series, Hickam began his popular "Josh Thurlow" series, set during World War II. The first of the series was The Keeper's Son (2003), set on the Outer Banks of North Carolina. The series continued with The Ambassador's Son (2005) and The Far Reaches (2007), both set in the South Pacific. His next novel was Red Helmet (2008), a love story set in the present-day Appalachian coalfields and dedicated to "Mine Rescue Teams Everywhere." In 2010, he co-authored My Dream of Stars (2010) with Anousheh Ansari, a multi-millionaire Iranian-American who became the world's first female commercial astronaut. Hickam, an avid amateur paleontologist, also wrote The Dinosaur Hunter, a novel set in Montana published by St. Martin's in November 2010.

Hickam also published a young-adult science-fiction thriller trilogy set on the moon, known as the Helium-3 series. It included the titles Crater, Crescent, and The Lunar Rescue Company.

In 2015, Wm Morrow/HarperCollins published his best-selling, award-winning book, Carrying Albert Home: The Somewhat True Story of a Man, His Wife, and Her Alligator, which has since been published in 17 languages.

In 2021, Hickam published a final sequel to 'Rocket Boys" titled Don't Blow Yourself Up: The Further Adventures and Travails of the Rocket Boy of October Sky. The memoir covered the 40 years after the Rocket Boys era including building the iconic cannon at Virginia Tech while a student there, his military service including time as a Lieutenant in the 4th Infantry Division in Vietnam, becoming a scuba instructor, diving on ship wrecks, his recovery efforts of drowned passengers on a river boat in the Tennessee River, his early writing career, working for NASA and training the first Japanese astronauts, being on the Hubble Space Telescope repair crew training team, negotiating with the Russians for the International Space Station, exploring and suffering decompression sickness on the remote Honduran island of Guanaja, writing 'Rocket Boys' and advising the director and producer on set of the movie October Sky and his relationship with Jake Gyllenhaal and the other actors in the film.

In 2025, Hickam began his own publishing imprint called "Homer Hickam Books" under the banner of Headline Publishing Group, a major Independent publisher.

=== Other activities ===
In May, 2013, Hickam opposed a zero tolerance policy at Bartow High School which resulted in the expulsion of a student whose science experiment had caused a small explosion.

In 2013, Hickam was appointed to the Alabama Space Science Exhibition Commission (ASSEC) that oversees the activities of Space Camp and the U.S. Space and Rocket Center museum and other activities in Huntsville, Alabama. He served as chairman of the commission in 2019, the 50th anniversary of the Apollo 11 Moon landing.

In 2016, Hickam sued Universal Studios for fraud and breach of contract over rights to his Rocket Boys sequels, including The Coalwood Way, Sky of Stone, We Are Not Afraid, and Carrying Albert Home. The lawsuit was settled in 2017 to Hickam's satisfaction. A lawsuit in federal court was initiated in 2017 for alleged copyright infringement by the Marriott Theatre in Lincolnshire, Illinois, and its writers and composers of Rocket Boys the Musical, Hickam's musical play based on his memoir Rocket Boys.

In February, 2018, Hickam was appointed by Vice President Mike Pence to serve as a member of the Users Advisory Group of the National Space Council, which had been re-established by President Donald Trump in June 2017.

== Honors ==
In 1984, Hickam was presented with Alabama's Distinguished Service Award for heroism shown during a rescue effort of the crew and passengers of a sunken paddleboat in the Tennessee River. Because of this award, Hickam was honored in 1996 by the United States Olympic Committee to carry the Olympic Torch through Huntsville, Alabama, on its way to Atlanta.

In 1999, the governor of West Virginia issued a proclamation in honor of Hickam for his support of his home state and his distinguished career as both an engineer and author and declared an annual "Rocket Boys Day".

In 2000, the Virginia Tech junior class selected Hickam as the namesake for the Virginia Tech class of 2002 ring collection, the Homer Hickam Collection.

In 2007, Hickam was awarded an honorary doctorate in Literature from Marshall University. That same year, he received the Distinguished Achievement Award from Virginia Tech.

In 2010, Hickam received the Audie Murphy Patriotism Award at the Spirit of America Festival.

In 2013, Hickam won the Clarence Cason Award from the University of Alabama for his non-fiction writing.

In 2014, Hickam won the Appalachian Heritage Writer's Award at Shepherd University.

In 2023, Hickam was presented with the Vietnam Veterans of America's Lifetime Achievement Award.

In 2024, Hickam was named the 2024 Virginia Tech Corps of Cadets Distinguished Alumni, at a ceremony on March 28 at the Corps Leadership & Military Science Building on the Virginia Tech campus.

In 2025, Hickam was inducted into the Space Camp Hall of Fame. The ceremony was held at the U.S. Space & Rocket Center's Davidson Saturn V Hall on July 11, 2025.

In 2026, Hickam, along with the other "Rocket Boys", Roy Lee Cooke, Jimmy O'Dell Carroll, Billy Rose, Sherman Siers, and the late Quentin Wilson, was inducted into the West Virginia Hall of Fame at a ceremony at McKeever Lodge in Pipestem Resort State Park, on May 16, 2026.

== Books ==
=== Coalwood series ===
- Rocket Boys: A Memoir (ISBN 0-385-33320-X)
- The Coalwood Way (ISBN 0-385-33516-4)
- Sky of Stone (ISBN 0-440-24092-1)
- We Are Not Afraid (ISBN 0-7573-0012-X)
- Carrying Albert Home (ISBN 9780062325891)
- Don't Blow Yourself Up (ISBN 1642938246)
- From Rocket Boys to October Sky An Amazon Kindle Single

=== Josh Thurlow series ===
- The Keeper's Son (ISBN 0-312-30189-8)
- The Ambassador's Son (ISBN 0-312-30192-8)
- The Far Reaches (ISBN 0-312-33475-3)
- Non-fiction companion volume: Torpedo Junction (ISBN 0-440-21027-5)

=== Helium-3 Trilogy ===
- Crater
- Crescent
- Crater Trueblood and the Lunar Rescue Company

=== Others ===
- Back to the Moon: A Novel (ISBN 0-440-23538-3)
- Red Helmet (ISBN 1-59554-214-0)
- Torpedo Junction (ISBN 1-55750-362-1)
- The Dinosaur Hunter (ISBN 0-312-38378-9)
- Paco: The Cat Who Meowed in Space An Amazon Kindle Single
