= October Sky =

1999 film by Joe Johnston

- Theatrical release poster
- Directed by: Joe Johnston
- Screenplay by: Lewis Colick
- Based on: Rocket Boys by Homer Hickam
- Produced by: Charles Gordon; Larry J. Franco
- Starring: Jake Gyllenhaal; Chris Cooper; Chris Owen; Laura Dern
- Cinematography: Fred Murphy
- Edited by: Robert Dalva
- Music by: Mark Isham
- Production company: Universal Pictures
- Distributed by: Universal Pictures
- Release date: February 19, 1999 (United States)
- Running time: 107 minutes
- Country: United States
- Language: English
- Budget: $25 million
- Box office: $34.7 million

October Sky is a 1999 American biographical drama film directed by Joe Johnston from a screenplay by Lewis Colick. It stars Jake Gyllenhaal, Chris Cooper, Chris Owen, and Laura Dern. Based on the book Rocket Boys (later published as October Sky), it tells the story of Homer H. Hickam Jr., a coal miner's son from Coalwood, West Virginia, who takes up amateur rocketry with his friends. Hickam would later become a NASA engineer.

Filming for October Sky took place at several locations in rural East Tennessee, including Oliver Springs, Harriman, and Kingston. The film continues to be celebrated in the region of its setting and filming. "October Sky" is an anagram of "Rocket Boys", the title of the 1998 memoir upon which the film is based. According to Hickam, Universal Studios changed the title of the film to October Sky because their research indicated that women over thirty would not see a film called Rocket Boys. The book was later re-released with the name October Sky to capitalize on interest in the film.

== Plot ==
In October 1957, the Soviet Union launches Sputnik 1, the first artificial satellite. Witnessing Sputnik as it passes over the mining community of Coalwood, West Virginia, 17-year-old Homer Hickam is inspired to build his own rockets. His family and friends are skeptical of his ambition, especially his father John Hickam, who wants Homer to work in the coal mine that he manages.

Homer recruits his friends Roy Lee Cooke and Sherman O'Dell, as well as the social outcast Quentin Wilson, to his rocketry team. Their teacher, Freida J. Riley, supports their endeavors as they launch their first small rockets. When one rocket lands near John's office and nearly injures some workers, John warns Homer not to launch rockets on company property again.

The boys begin launching rockets beyond the borders of the coal company's property with the help of Ike Bykovsky, the manager of the mine's machine shop. John continues to oppose Homer's rocketry and sends Bykovsky to work in the mine as punishment for helping the boys. After several of their rockets explode, the boys finally get a rocket to fly.

The rocket launches attract the interest of the community, but the boys are forced to abandon their pursuits after they are accused of starting a wildfire with a stray rocket. After a mining accident injures John and kills Bykovsky, Homer is devastated, as he feels responsible for Bykovsky's death. However, John tells Homer that Bykovsky was not forced to stay in the mine, so Homer is not to blame for his death. Homer drops out of high school to work in the mine, contributing to his family's income as his father recovers.

Homer is inspired by Miss Riley to read a book on applied rocket science, which teaches him how to calculate a rocket's trajectory. He and Quentin use this knowledge to locate their missing rocket and prove it could not have started the fire. The boys present their findings to Miss Riley and the school principal, Mr. Turner, who later determines that the fire was caused by a flare from a nearby airfield.

Homer leaves the mines and returns to school and rocketry. The boys win the school science fair, which allows Homer to attend the National Science Fair in Indianapolis. Homer's presentation on rocketry is well received at the National Science Fair, but someone steals a key piece of his equipment—the de Laval nozzle. Homer makes an urgent call to his mother Elsie, who enlists the new machine shop manager, Mr. Bolden, to build a replacement nozzle.

The nozzle is shipped overnight to Indianapolis. Homer wins the top prize in the competition, after which he is bombarded with college scholarship offers. He returns to Coalwood triumphant and visits Miss Riley, who is dying of Hodgkin lymphoma. Many Coalwood citizens come to watch the launch of the boys' final rocket, including John, who had not attended any of the previous launches. The rocket, named Miss Riley, reaches an altitude of 30,000 feet (9,100 m). During the closing credits, it is explained that Miss Riley died soon after the launch. It is revealed that all the boys went to college, and Homer went to work for NASA.

== Cast ==
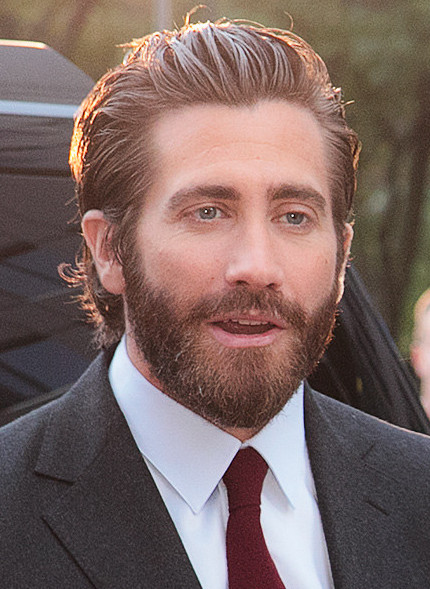
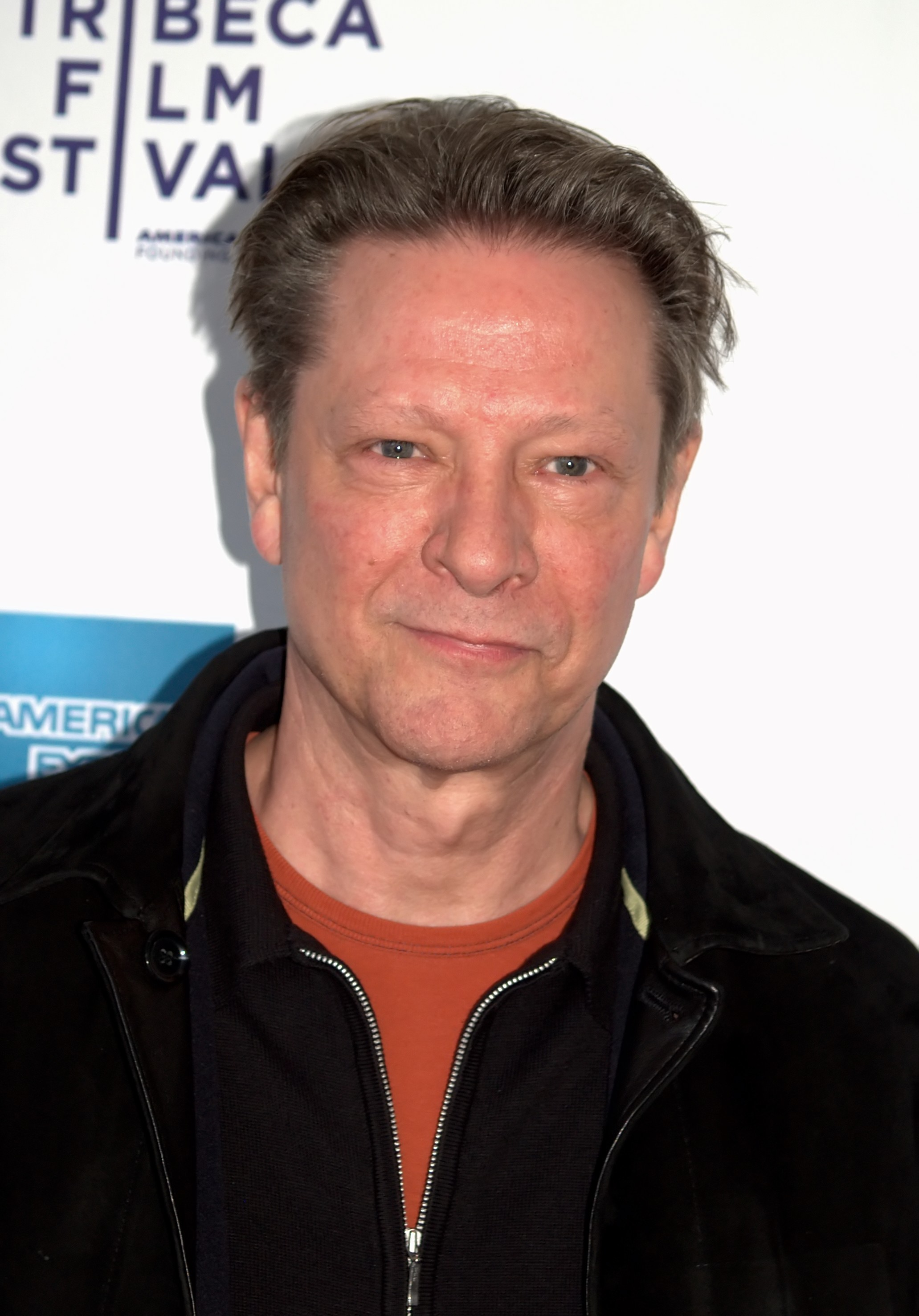
Jake Gyllenhaal (left, pictured in 2015) and Chris Cooper (2009)
- Jake Gyllenhaal as Homer Hickam: A West Virginia teenager seeking a career in rocketry
- Chris Cooper as John Hickam: The foreman of the Coalwood coal mine
- Chris Owen as Quentin Wilson: A highly intelligent student who joins Homer's rocketry team
- Laura Dern as Miss Freida J. Riley: A high school teacher who encourages Homer and his friends in their rocketry
- William Lee Scott as Roy Lee Cooke: One of Homer's friends on the rocketry team
- Chad Lindberg as Sherman O'Dell: One of Homer's friends on the rocketry team
- Natalie Canerday as Elsie Hickam: Homer's mother
- Scott Thomas as Jim Hickam: Homer's older brother who is a star football player
- Randy Stripling as Leon Bolden: The manager of the mine's machine shop after Ike Bykovsky dies
- Chris Ellis as Principal Turner: The principal of Homer's high school
- Elya Baskin as Ike Bykovsky: The manager of the mine's machine shop who helps Homer and his friends
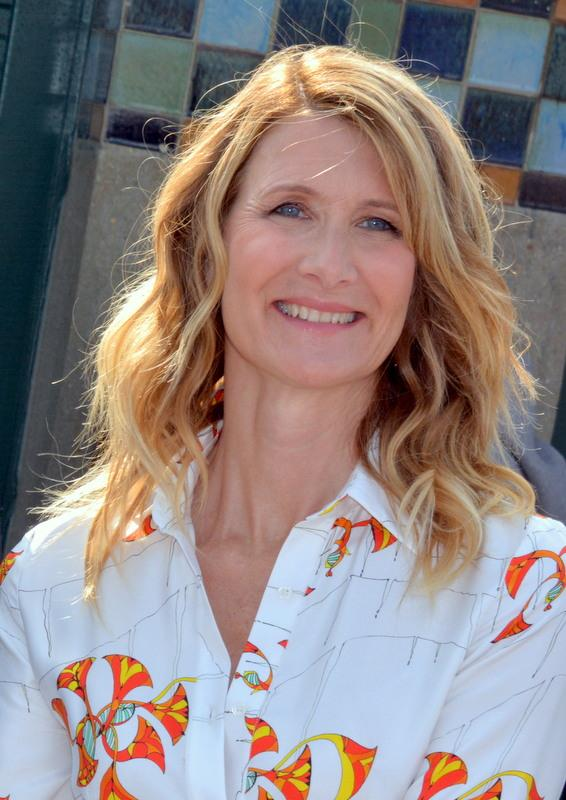
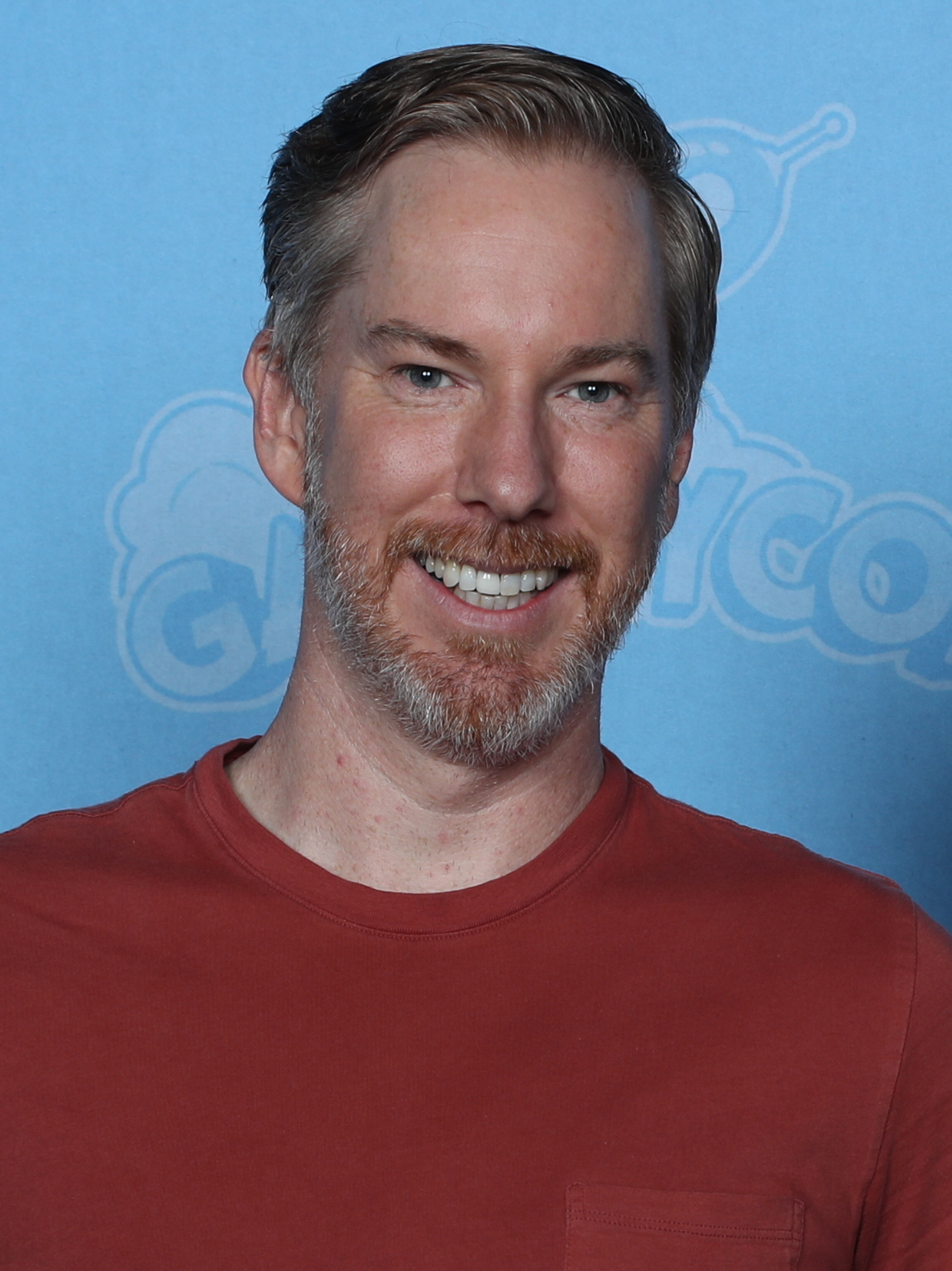
  Laura Dern (left, pictured in 2017) and Chris Owen (2021)
- Courtney Cole-Fendley as Dorothy Platt: A popular high school cheerleader
- David Dwyer as Jake Mosby
- Winston Link as a railroad engineer
- Andy Stahl as Jack Palmer
- Mark Jeffrey Miller as Vernon
- Don Henderson Baker as Jensen
- Kaili Hollister as Valentine Carmina: A high school girl who begins a relationship with Homer

== Production ==
Universal Pictures acquired the film rights to Rocket Boys from Homer Hickam in 1996, two years before the story was published as a memoir. Lewis Colick wrote the screenplay for the film, and its working title was Rocket Boys. By July 1997, the screenplay was shown to Joe Johnston, who at the time was committed to directing a film based on the Marvel Comics character Hulk. However, Johnston felt so inspired by Rocket Boys that he signed on to direct it while backing out of the Hulk film. The title of the film was ultimately changed to October Sky.

Principal photography began on February 23, 1998, and occurred in East Tennessee. Producer Larry J. Franco said that because the film took place over the course of a school year, the crew needed a location that could support scenes set in autumn, winter and spring. The film crew built the sets to look like the mining town of Coalwood in 1957. More than 2,000 extras were used in the film. Jake Gyllenhaal, who was 17 during filming, was tutored on set because he was still in school and taking advanced classes. The Tennessee Valley Authority (TVA) permitted the crew to have control over a stretch of railroad tracks, and allowed them to pull up rails as needed. The Chattanooga-based Tennessee Valley Railroad Museum (TVRM) lent one of their steam locomotives, Southern Railway 4501, for use in the film; it was painted with Norfolk and Western lettering, since the story was set in West Virginia. Filming concluded on April 30, 1998.

== Release ==
October Sky opened on February 19, 1999, in 1,495 theaters and had an opening weekend gross of $5.9 million. At its widest release, 1,702 theaters were showing the film. It had a total lifetime gross of $34.7 million worldwide.

== Reception ==
=== Critical response ===
The review aggregator Rotten Tomatoes reports that 90% of 72 critics gave October Sky positive reviews. The website's critical consensus states: "Rich in sweet sincerity, intelligence, and good old-fashioned inspirational drama, October Sky is a coming-of-age story with a heart to match its Hollywood craftsmanship." Metacritic gave the film a score of 71 out of 100 based on reviews from 23 critics. Audiences surveyed by CinemaScore gave the film a grade "A" on scale of A to F.

Roger Ebert found "deep values" in October Sky, and he praised its nuanced portrayal of a father-son relationship. Lisa Schwarzbaum of Entertainment Weekly and Maitland McDonagh of TV Guide felt the acting of Gyllenhaal and Cooper was the film's highlight. David Sterritt of The Christian Science Monitor praised the screenplay and the acting of Gyllenhaal and Cooper, but criticized Johnston's "heavy handed" storytelling.

=== Awards ===
October Sky won three awards, including the OCIC Award for Joe Johnston at the Ajijic International Film Festival, the Critics' Choice Award for Best Family Film, and the Humanitas Prize for Featured Film Category. (Note: Attributed to multiple references:)

== Differences between the film and book ==
October Sky was praised for its portrayal of 1950s Appalachia despite the differences between it and the book upon which it is based.

- Homer Hickam Jr.'s father was also named Homer, and not John. His name was changed in the film to avoid confusing the audience.
- There were actually six "rocket boys" rather than the four in the film. Some of the film's characters are combinations of real-life boys. The names of the real-life boys were Homer Hickam Jr., Quentin Wilson, Jimmy O'Dell Carroll, Roy Lee Cooke, Billy Rose, and Sherman Siers.
- The real-life boys did not steal railroad parts as depicted in the film. However, they did attempt to grab a cast iron pipe from under the tracks, and according to Hickam's website, this almost got him killed.
- While the boys were accused of starting a fire, they were never detained. The police soon realized that their rockets could not have traveled over three miles, and the boys were exonerated. Homer never had to prove their innocence, as his character did in the film.
- Homer never dropped out of school to work in the mine. However, he did work there the following summer, as described in Hickam's book Sky of Stone.
- Homer never met Wernher von Braun—as it turns out, von Braun was looking for Homer's exhibit when Homer was looking for him, and they missed each other.

== Cultural impact ==
There are two annual festivals in honor of the rocket boys and the film. One is held in Coalwood, West Virginia, where the real-life events depicted in the book and film took place, and the other is in Tennessee where the film was shot.

Jeff Bezos, the billionaire founder of Amazon, saw a screening of October Sky in 1999. In a subsequent conversation with the science fiction writer Neal Stephenson, Bezos said he had always wanted to start a space company, and Stephenson urged him to do so. Bezos then started the private aerospace manufacturing and services company Blue Origin, and Stephenson became one of the company's early employees.

Hickam has claimed that the Star Trek Enterprise episode "Carbon Creek" is based on October Sky.
