= Guffey Coal Act =

US federal law passed in 1935

The Guffey-Snyder Coal Act was a law, officially known as the Bituminous Coal Conservation Act of 1935, passed in the United States in 1935 under Franklin D. Roosevelt as part of his New Deal. It created the Bituminous Coal Commission to set the price of coal and end other unfair practices of competition. The law also created the Bituminous Coal Labor Board to regulate maximum work hours and minimum wage but was later ruled to be unconstitutional in Carter v. Carter Coal Co. because the Supreme Court did not find the law's labor provisions to qualify as interstate commerce and therefore considered its actions beyond the jurisdiction of the federal government.

It was replaced in 1937 with the Guffey-Vinson Coal Act, officially known as the Bituminous Coal Conservation Act of 1937, which was not ruled unconstitutional. The act resurrected the Bituminous Coal Commission and reinstated the provisions regarding price fixing and the regulation of unfair practices but removed the labor provisions of the previous act. In 1939, the Bituminous Coal Commission was abolished, and its duties were transferred to the US Department of the Interior.

The Act increased profits, wages, and union membership, and reduced strikes. However, it faced opposition from businesses, Republicans and conservatives for too much government interference in business, many felt it was a socialist policy. Conservatives feared it would set a precedent for regulation to affect other industries and thus questioned if it was constitutional. Large consumers of coal also argued it would unreasonably increase prices, and operators from the south and west said it discriminated against low-wage and non-union mines.

== See also ==
- Joseph F. Guffey
