= The Far Reaches =

2007 novel by Homer Hickam

- Author: Homer Hickam
- Language: English
- Series: Josh Thurlow
- Publisher: Thomas Dunne Books
- Publication date: June 12, 2007
- Media type: Print (hardcover, paperback), e-book
- Pages: 320 pages
- ISBN: 0312334753
- Preceded by: The Ambassador's Son

The Far Reaches is a 2007 novel by American author Homer Hickam and the third novel in the Josh Thurlow series. The book was published on June 12, 2007 through Thomas Dunne Books and takes place during World War II, following the adventures of Coast Guard captain Josh Thurlow. Of the book, Hickam stated that he drew from his experiences in Vietnam while writing the book's South Pacific combat scenes.

== Plot ==
The book takes place in 1943 in the Pacific Ocean. Josh Thurlow is on hand at the Battle of Tarawa as the Navy deploys Marines at island after island, but nothing ends up going as planned.

== Main characters ==
- Josh Thurlow, a Captain in the United States Coast Guard
- Mary Kathleen, a young Irish nun who escapes a Japanese prisoner of war camp

== Critical reaction ==
Critical reception for The Far Reaches was mixed. The L.A. Times felt that Hickam was critical of modern America and Japan for their increasingly anti-war attitudes, and suggested the book was out of date in an era of more complex conflicts in Iraq and Afghanistan. In contrast, Publishers Weekly praised it as a piece of genre fiction and said that Hickam "keeps the stakes high and the tension taut".
