= Rocket Boys =

Book by Homer Hickam

- First edition
- Author: Homer Hickam Jr.
- Genre: non-fiction, memoir
- Publisher: Delacorte Press (United States)
- Publication place: United States
- Pages: 384
- ISBN: 0-385-33320-X (hardcover edition)
- OCLC: 38959691
- Dewey Decimal: 629.1/092/273 B 21
- LC Class: TL789.85.H53 A3 1998
- Followed by: The Coalwood Way

Rocket Boys is the first memoir in a series of four, by American engineer Homer Hickam Jr., published in 1998. Some editions were published under the title October Sky as a tie-in to the 1999 film adaptation.

It is a story of growing up in a mining town, and a boy's pursuit of amateur rocketry in a coal mining town. The book won the W.D. Weatherford Award in 1998, the year of its release. Today, it is one of the most often picked community/library reads in the United States. It is also studied in many school systems around the world. October Sky was followed by The Coalwood Way (2000), Sky of Stone (2002), and Carrying Albert Home (2015).

Rocket Boys was made into a film in 1999, titled October Sky (an anagram of "Rocket Boys"). The book was then re-published as October Sky shortly afterwards.

== Plot summary ==
Homer "Sonny" Hickam Jr. (Note: In the book, the main character is always called Sonny, however, in the movie October Sky, he is called Homer.) lives in Coalwood, West Virginia, a small coalmining company town. After seeing the Soviet satellite Sputnik, he decides to join the American team of rocket engineers called the Missile Agency when he graduates from school.

His older brother Jim excels at football, and expects to get a college football scholarship. However, Sonny is terrible at sports and has no special skill that would get him "out of Coalwood". His mother is afraid that he will have to work in the mines after high school.

His first attempt at rocketry, which occurred when he was 14, consisted of a flashlight tube and model airplane body as a casing. It is fueled by flash powder from old cherry bombs, and explodes violently, destroying his mother's fence. After that, he enlists the help of Quentin Wilson, Roy Lee Cooke, Sherman Siers, Jimmy "O'Dell" Carroll, and Billy Rose to help build rockets while forming the Big Creek Missile Agency. Their first real rocket, powered by black powder, is named Auk 1, an allusion to the great auk, which is a flightless seabird that became extinct in the mid-19th century). Auk 1 flies six feet before the solder melts, and the nozzle, a washer, separates from the casement.

They call themselves the "Rocket Boys" and call the place where they are launching their rockets "Cape Coalwood", in honor of Cape Canaveral. The Rocket Boys enjoy mixed success during their three-year rocket-launching campaign from 1957 to 1960. They employ several fuel mixtures including rocket candy and a mixture called "zincoshine", which is composed of zinc dust and sulfur, along with alcohol from moonshine, supplied by a local bootlegger, as a binder for the mixture. They launch a total of 35 rockets, all sequentially numbered Auk I–XXXI. (There are five different Auk XXIIs.) They also win a science fair gold medal for their rockets and project titled "A Study of Amateur Rocketry Techniques".

== Characters ==
- Homer "Sonny" Hickam Jr. is the author and narrator of the memoir. He is 8 years old at the beginning of the story, but is in high school for most of the book. He serves as the leader of the Rocket Boys. He is nearsighted, wears glasses, and plays in the school band.
- Elsie Hickam is Homer Hickam's wife and the mother of Jim and "Sonny" Hickam. She has a tense relationship with her husband through most of the story. She is supportive of Sonny's rocket building, and often finds herself at odds with her husband, Homer Sr., about the rocket building. She says to Sonny: "Don't blow yourself up." She works on a mural of Myrtle Beach throughout the memoir.
- Homer Hickam Sr. is Elsie Hickam's husband, and the father of Jim and "Sonny" Hickam. He is the hard-headed mine foreman in Coalwood. He takes his job very seriously, going out of his way to help miners in distress. He is almost always at odds with the union leader, John Dubonnet, who dated Elsie when they were all in high school together. Homer Sr. seems to not care about Sonny's affairs as much as he does Jim's; Sonny points this out in the book much to Homer Sr.'s chagrin. He has a spot on his lung that is the common miner's disease, black lung (Coal Workers' Pneumoconiosis), but refuses to quit work, although most men who are discovered to have this illness are forced into retirement, but allowed to stay in Coalwood.
- Jim Hickam is Homer Hickam Jr.'s older brother, and the son of Elsie and Homer Hickam. He is a star athlete, which leads to him having several conflicts with "Sonny" over how Homer seems to favor Jim over "Sonny". He dates the girl Sonny is in love with, Dorothy Plunk, but later dumps her like he does with many of his girlfriends.
- Quentin Wilson is one of the more intelligent members of the Rocket Boys, the one who does the most math. Quentin carries a suitcase stuffed with books wherever he goes and finds excuses to get out of gym class. He is excitable and often confounds the other members and townspeople with his advanced vocabulary.
- Jimmy "O'Dell" Carroll is small and excitable, the most emotional member of the group. His father drives the town garbage truck, allowing O'Dell access to many useful items, frequently scrounged to further the group's efforts. He is always scheming of ways of making money, from the failed iron scrap attempt—which took an entire summer, yielded a net loss of one dollar, not counting the destruction of borrowed equipment and almost killing Sonny—to the profitable harvesting of ginseng.
- Sherman Siers has a weakened left leg as a result of polio, but does not let it slow him down. He is also the most observant and practical member of the team. At the age of 34, Sherman died unexpectedly of a heart attack.
- Roy Lee Cooke is Sonny's best friend. He teaches Sonny something about girls. In the follow-up memoir titled The Coalwood Way, it is revealed that he is known as The Big Creek Lovemaster. Roy Lee also knows the moonshiner in town, John Eye, who provides the boys with the alcohol needed for their special propellant they call Zincoshine. On page 302, Roy Lee states that if they were successful in flying the rocket, "She wouldn't be able to get out of her panties fast enough," (referring to a cheerleader).
- Willie "Billy" Rose is a member of the Rocket Boys who joins the group about a year after it is founded. He has excellent eyesight and can find rockets very well. He is the best runner in the group.
- Freida J. Riley is a chemistry and physics teacher at Big Creek High School who inspires the Rocket Boys to compete in the National Science Fair. She gives Sonny a book called Principles of Guided Missile Design that is extremely useful to the Rocket Boys in the future. She also orchestrates the Rocket Boys' entry into the National Science Fair. She is diagnosed with Hodgkin lymphoma shortly before Sonny leaves for the science fair. At first her affliction goes into remission, but she later dies of the disease.
- Jake Mosby is a womanizing alcoholic who helps the BCMA in paying off debts. Jake is a mining engineer. He also introduces them to a writer of a small newspaper, Basil Oglethorpe. He later settles down a bit and starts dating Miss Riley for a period of time, trying to be dependable for her. He is a veteran of the Korean War, and compares the BCMA's rocket launches to his war experiences.
- Basil Oglethorpe is the writer of a small newspaper called the McDowell County Banner. He makes sure to attend the boys' rocket launches and uses them to boost popularity for his newspaper.
- Mr. Ferro is in charge of a group of company machinists who helps the BCMA build their rockets.
- Mr. Caton is a machinist in Mr. Ferro's team and the main builder of the BCMA's rockets.
- Dorothy Plunk is Sonny's dream girl; he even describes her as "God's Perfection" at one point in the memoir. While Sonny spends most of his time infatuated with her, although she still spends time with him, Dorothy only wants a friend relationship and goes out with other boys. For a large section of the book, Sonny ignores her, because she started a relationship with his brother Jim. She was also the valedictorian of Sonny's graduating high school class and got the spot Sonny wanted in a calculus class because her grades were higher.
- Valentine Carmina is an older girl who likes Sonny. Ultimately, it is implied she has sex with him in the backseat of a car on the same night Dorothy breaks his heart. Homer later describes the event as her pity to him.
- Mr. Isaac Bykovski is a worker in the mine who helps Sonny with his first rockets. Homer Sr. makes him work in the mine as punishment for helping Sonny. Later, Homer Sr. offers him his job back in the machine shop, but Bykovski does not accept the offer because he made more money in the mine. He is later killed in a mine collapse while operating a loader.
- Geneva Eggers is a middle-aged woman who was rescued as a baby by Homer Hickam Sr. when her house was on fire. The rest of her family was still in the house when it went up in flames but she was the only one whom Homer Sr. saw. Everyone else in her family perished. It is implied that after the fire, she turned to prostitution in order to support herself. During the novel, she invites Sonny into her home when he almost freezes to death on a December night and gives him a new set of clothes. Sonny feels uncomfortable changing in front of her and, sensing the hesitation, she replies, "Oh, come on. You ain't gonna show me nothin' I ain't already seen too many times."
- Buchanan "Buck" Trant is a football player who hates Sonny. He insults Sonny and even starts to tear down "Cape Coalwood."
