= The Coalwood Way =

Book by Homer Hickam

- First edition
- Author: Homer Hickam, Jr.
- Language: English
- Genre: Memoir
- Published: 2000
- Publisher: Delacorte Press
- Publication place: United States
- Preceded by: Rocket Boys
- Followed by: Sky of Stone

The Coalwood Way (2000) is the second memoir in a series of three, by Homer Hickam, Jr. The Coalwood Way is a story of the Rocket Boys and Coalwood. Homer calls it an "equal," rather than a sequel because the story happens during the same timeframe as the first book. Today, it is one of the most often picked community/library reads in the United States. It is also studied in many school systems around the world. The Coalwood Way (2000) is followed by Sky of Stone (2002), and preceded by Rocket Boys (1998).

== Plot summary ==
By 1959, the "Rocket Boys" were continuing to build handmade rockets while finishing their final year of high school. Homer aimed to show his father that he was capable of attending college. During this time, the local coal mine faced possible closure due to a lack of resources, leading to losing jobs and reduction in public services.

To keep the mine open, Homer’s father planned to use a controversial new mining method in order to save the town and the mine from oblivion. These events created social tension between Homer’s mother and other residents, as her husband’s position as superintendent caused disagreements with the families of union workers. Despite these difficulties, the memoir describes how the community organized local events during the holiday season, when Coalwood needed it the most.

== Characters ==
- Homer "Sonny" Hickam, Jr. is the fun main kid and narrator of the story. He is 8 years old at the beginning of the story, and serves as the unspoken leader of the Rocket Boys. He is very nearsighted and requires glasses. Jim is his star athlete brother, and Homer Hickam, the mine superintendent, is his dad. Elsie Lavender Hickam is Homer Sr.'s wife and their mom.
- Quentin Wilson is an intelligent member of the Rocket Boys and the person who does the most math out of the entire group. Quentin carries around a suitcase stuffed with books wherever he goes and finds excuses to get out of gym class. He is excitable and often confounds the other members and townspeople with his advanced vocabulary when jumpy.
- Jimmy "O'Dell" Carroll is small and excitable, the most emotional member of the group. His father drove the town garbage truck, allowing O'Dell access to many useful items, frequently scrounged to further the group's efforts. He is always scheming ways of making money, from the failed iron scrap attempt—which took an entire summer, yielded a net loss of one dollar, not counting the destruction of borrowed equipment, and almost killed Sonny—to the profitable harvesting of ginseng.
- Sherman Siers has a physically weakened left leg as a result of polio, but does not let it slow him down. He is also the most observant and practical member of the team.
- Roy Lee Cooke is Sonny's best friend. He teaches Sonny something about girls. In the follow-up memoir titled The Coalwood Way, it is revealed that he is known as The Big Creek Lovemaster. Roy Lee also knows the moonshiner in town, John Eye, who provides the boys with the alcohol needed for their special propellant they call Zincoshine.
- Willie "Billy" Rose is a member of the Rocket Boys who joins the group about a year after it is founded. He has excellent eyesight and can find rockets very well. He is the best runner in the group.
- Miss Riley is a chemistry and physics teacher at Big Creek High School who inspires the Rocket Boys to compete in the National Science Fair. She gives Sonny a book called Principles of Guided Missile Design that is extremely useful to the Rocket Boys in the future. She also orchestrates the Rocket Boys' entry into the National Science Fair. She is diagnosed with Hodgkin's Lymphoma shortly before Sonny leaves for the science fair. At first her affliction goes into remission, but later she dies of her disease.
- Jake Mosby is a womanizing alcoholic who helps the Big Creek Missile Agency (BCMA) in paying off debts. Jake is a mining engineer. He also introduces them to a writer of a small newspaper, Basil Oglethorpe. He later settles down a bit and starts dating Miss Riley for a period of time, trying to be dependable for her.
- Basil Oglethorpe is the writer of a small newspaper called the McDowell County Banner. He is in charge of the BCMA's publicity.
- Mr. Ferro is in charge of a group of company machinists who help the BCMA build their rockets.
- Mr. Caton is a machinist in Mr. Ferro's team. He is the main builder of the BCMA's rockets.
- Homer Hickam, Sr. is a hard-headed mine foreman in Coalwood and Sonny's father. He takes his job very seriously, going out of his way to help miners in distress. He is almost always at odds with the union leader, John Dubonnet, who dated Elsie when they were all in high school together. Homer Sr. seems to not care about Sonny's affairs as much as he does Jim's; Sonny points this out in the book much to Homer Sr.'s chagrin. He has a spot on his lung that is the common miner's disease, black lung (Coal Workers' Pneumoconiosis), but refuses to quit work, although most men who are discovered to have this illness are forced into retirement, but allowed to stay in Coalwood.
- Elsie Hickam is Sonny's mother. She is supportive of Sonny's rocket building, but often finds herself at odds with her husband, Homer Sr., about the rocket building. She often tells Sonny, "Don't blow yourself up." She is consistently working on a mural of Myrtle Beach throughout the memoir.
- Dorothy Plunk is Sonny's dream girl; he even describes her as "God's Perfection" at one point in the memoir. While Sonny spends most of his time infatuated with her, although she still spends time with him, Dorothy only wants a friend relationship and goes out with other boys. For a large section of the book, Sonny ignores her, because she started a relationship with his brother Jim. She was also the valedictorian of Sonny's graduating high school class and took Sonny's spot in a calculus class because her grades were higher.
- Valentine Carmina is an older girl who likes Sonny. Ultimately, she taught him about having sex in the backseat of an old Dodge the same day Dorothy broke his heart.
- Jim Hickam is Sonny's older brother who plays for the school's football team. He dates the girl Sonny is in love with, Dorothy Plunk, but later dumps her like he does with many of his girlfriends.
- Mr. Isaac Bykovski is a worker in the mine who helps Sonny with his first rockets. Homer Sr. makes him work in the mine as punishment for helping Sonny. Later, Homer Sr. offers him his job back in the machine shop, but Bykovski does not accept the offer because he made more money in the mine. He is later killed in a mine collapse while operating a loader.
- Geneva Eggers is a middle-aged woman who was rescued as a baby by Homer Hickam Sr. when her house was on fire. The rest of her family were still in the house when it went up in flames but she was the only one whom Homer Sr. saw. Everyone else in her family perished. It is implied that after the fire, she turned to prostitution in order to support herself. During the novel, she invites Sonny into her home when he almost freezes to death on a December night and gives him a new set of clothes. Sonny feels uncomfortable changing in front of her and, sensing the hesitation, she replies, "Oh, come on. You ain't gonna show me nothin' I ain't already seen too many times."
- Buchanan "Buck" Trant is a football player who hates Sonny. He insults Sonny and even starts to tear down "Cape Coalwood."
