= Carter Coal Company Store (Coalwood, West Virginia) =

- U.S. National Register of Historic Places
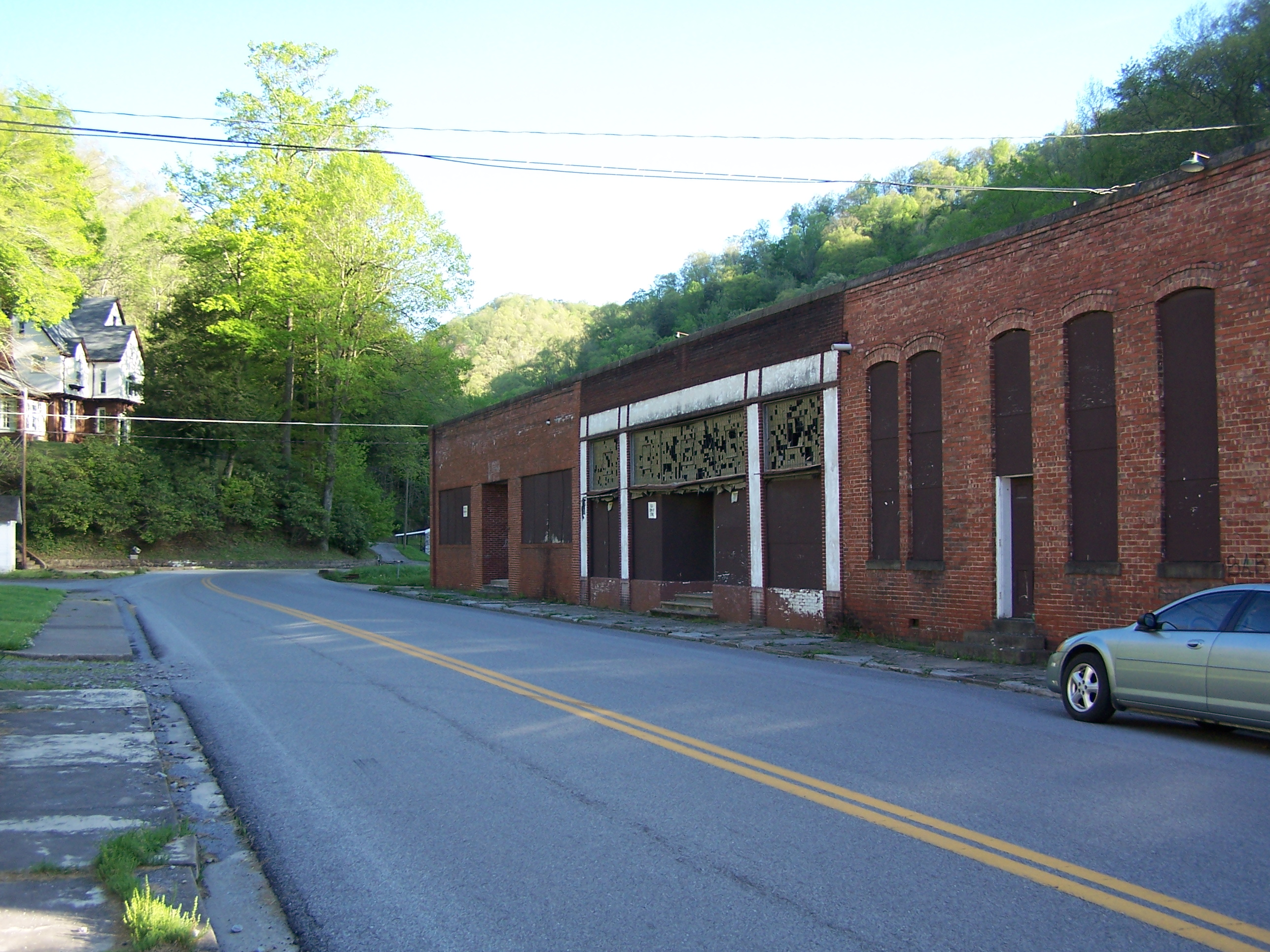
- Building in May 2007

- Location within West Virginia Location within the United States
- Location: Co. Rt. 2, Coalwood, West Virginia
- Coordinates: 37°23′14″N 81°39′6″W
- Area: 2 acres (0.81 ha)
- Built: 1922
- Architectural style: Late 19th And Early 20th Century American Movements
- MPS: Coal Company Stores in McDowell County MPS
- NRHP reference No.: 92000328
- Added to NRHP: April 17, 1992

The Carter Coal Company Store was a historic company store building located at Coalwood, McDowell County, West Virginia. It was built by the Carter Coal Company about 1912, and remodeled in 1922. The one-story brick building housed a store, company offices, and a post office.

It was listed on the National Register of Historic Places in 1992.

The building was demolished on March 29, 2008, by owner Alawest. The site is now a grassy plot with a gazebo.

== See also ==
- Carter Coal Company Store (Caretta, West Virginia)
- Carter v. Carter Coal Co.
