= Principles of Guided Missile Design =

1958 textbook by C.W. Besserer

- Editor: Merrill Grayson
- Language: English
- Genre: Nonfiction, Textbook
- Publisher: D. Van Nostrand Company, Princeton, NJ
- Publication date: 1955
- Publication place: United States

Principles of Guided Missile Design was a textbook and reference book series on spaceflight and guided missiles edited Merrill Grayson, U.S. Navy Captain. The series was published 1955 to 1964 by D. Van Nostrand Company, Princeton, New Jersey.

Notable experts contributed, such as Krafft Arnold Ehricke and Maurice J. Zucrow, and number of reviews were published. These books are out of print and considered rare. Only a few digitized copies exist.

== Titles ==
- Locke, A. S. (1955). Grayson, M. (ed.). Guidance. Principles of Guided Missile Design. D. Van Nostrand.
- Haviland, R. P., House, C. M. (1956). Grayson, M. (ed.). Handbook of Satellites and Space Vehicles. Principles of Guided Missile Design. D. Van Nostrand.
- Bonney, E. A., Zucrow, M. J., Besserer, C. W. (1956). Grayson, M. (ed.). Aerodynamics, Propulsion, Structures and Design Practice. Principles of Guided Missile Design. D. Van Nostrand.
- Goldberg, H., Helmholz, R. H. (1956). Grayson, M. (ed.). Operations Research, Armament, Launching. Principles of Guided Missile Design. D. Van Nostrand.
- Besserer, C. W. (1959). Grayson, M. (ed.). Missile Engineering Handbook. Principles of Guided Missile Design. D. Van Nostrand.
- Grayson, M. (1959). Grayson, M. (ed.). Dictionary of Guided Missiles and Space Flight. Principles of Guided Missile Design. D. Van Nostrand.
- Grayson, M. (1959). Ehricke, K. A. (ed.). Space Flight, Volume I: Environment and Celestial Mechanics. Principles of Guided Missile Design. D. Van Nostrand.
- Ehricke, K. A. (1962). Grayson, M. (ed.). Space Flight, Volume II: Dynamics. Principles of Guided Missile Design. D. Van Nostrand.
- Ehricke, K. A. (1962). Grayson, M. (ed.). Space Flight, Volume III: Operations. Principles of Guided Missile Design. D. Van Nostrand.
- Jerger, J. J. (1960). Grayson, M. (ed.). Systems Preliminary Design. Principles of Guided Missile Design. D. Van Nostrand.
- Povejsil, D. J., Raven, R. S., Waterman, P. J. (1961). Grayson, M. (ed.). Airborne Radar. Principles of Guided Missile Design. D. Van Nostrand.
- Parvin, R. H. (1962). Grayson, M. (ed.). Inertial Navigation. Principles of Guided Missile Design. D. Van Nostrand.
- Newman, D. B. (1964). Grayson, M. (ed.). Space Vehicle Electronics. Principles of Guided Missile Design. D. Van Nostrand.
- Scavullo, J. J., Paul, F. J. (1965). Grayson, M. (ed.). Aerospace Ranges. Instrumentation. Principles of Guided Missile Design. D. Van Nostrand.
