= Carter Coal Company Store (Caretta, West Virginia) =

- U.S. National Register of Historic Places
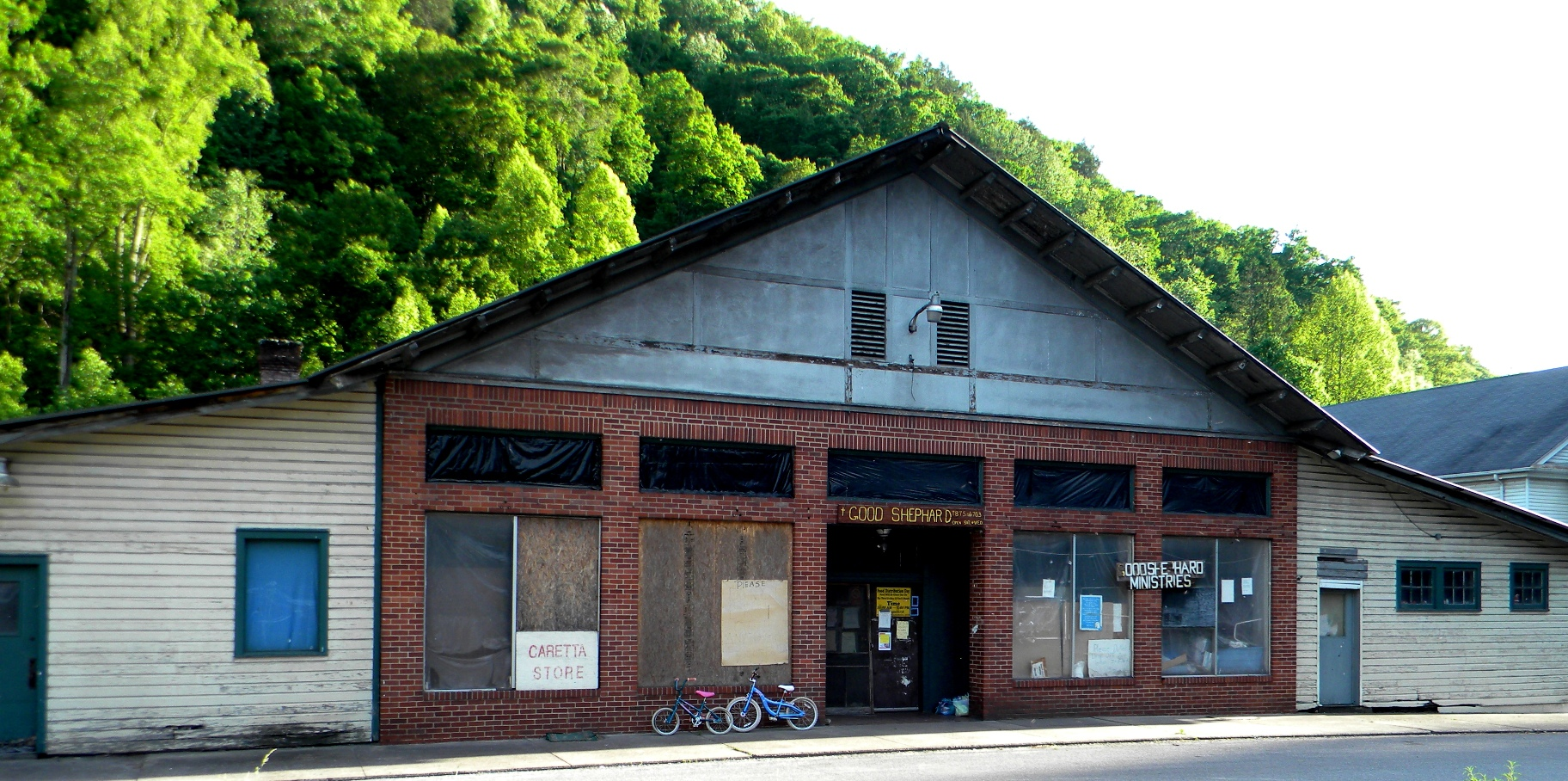

- Location within West Virginia Location within the United States
- Location: Jct. of WV 16 and Co. Rt. 12/8, Caretta, West Virginia
- Coordinates: 37°20′1″N 81°40′28″W
- Area: less than one acre
- Built: 1922
- Architectural style: L plan
- MPS: Coal Company Stores in McDowell County MPS
- NRHP reference No.: 92000329
- Added to NRHP: April 17, 1992

Carter Coal Company Store, also known as Consolidation Coal Company Store, is a historic company store building located at Caretta, McDowell County, West Virginia. It was built about 1912 by the Carter Coal Company, and is a one-story brick commercial building on a stone foundation. It has a gable roof. The building was originally T-shaped, but wood-frame additions built in 1922, spread the plan to an "L." . It ceased operating as a post office in August 2005.

It was listed on the National Register of Historic Places in 1992.

== See also ==
- Carter Coal Company Store (Coalwood, West Virginia)
- Carter v. Carter Coal Co.
