= Carter v. Carter Coal Co. =

Carter v. Carter Coal Company
- Supreme Court of the United States

Argued March 11, 1936 Decided May 18, 1936
- Full case name: Carter v. Carter Coal Company
- Citations: 298 U.S. 238 (more) 56 S. Ct. 855; 80 L. Ed. 1160; 1936 U.S. LEXIS 950

Holding
- The Coal Conservation Act is not within Congress' power under the Commerce Clause. Just because a commodity will, in the future, be sold in interstate commerce does not give Congress the right to regulate it before the event occurs.

Court membership
- Chief Justice Charles E. Hughes Associate Justices Willis Van Devanter · James C. McReynolds; Louis Brandeis · George Sutherland; Pierce Butler · Harlan F. Stone; Owen Roberts · Benjamin N. Cardozo

Case opinions
- Majority: Sutherland, joined by Van Devanter, McReynolds, Butler, Roberts
- Concur/dissent: Hughes
- Concur/dissent: Cardozo, joined by Brandeis, Stone

Laws applied
- Commerce Clause, Guffey Coal Act
- Overruled by
- United States v. Darby Lumber Co., 312 U.S. 100 (1941) (in part)

Carter v. Carter Coal Company, 298 U.S. 238 (1936), is a United States Supreme Court decision interpreting the Commerce Clause of the United States Constitution, which permits the United States Congress to "regulate Commerce... among the several States." Specifically, it analyzes the extent of Congress' power, according to the Commerce Clause, looking at whether or not they have the right to regulate manufacturing.

== Background ==
The Bituminous Coal Conservation Act was passed in 1935 and replaced the previous codes set forth by the National Industry Recovery Act (NIRA). The new law established a commission, made up of coal miners, coal producers, and the public, to establish fair competition standards, production standards, wages, hours, and labor relations. All mines were required to pay a 15% tax on coal produced. Mines that complied with the Act would be refunded 90% of the 15% tax.

James W. Carter was a bitter foe of the United Mine Workers; he was a shareholder of the Carter Coal Company of McDowell County, West Virginia and did not feel that the company should join the government program. The board of directors for the company thought that the company could not afford to pay the tax if it did not receive anything back.

Carter sued the federal government and his own father who was also named Carter. The plaintiff claimed that coal mining was not interstate commerce and so could not be regulated by Congress.

The question was whether Congress, according to the Commerce Clause, has the power to regulate the coal mining industry.

== Decision ==
=== Majority opinion ===
The Supreme Court majority ruled in favor of the plaintiff the younger Carter. The Supreme Court ruled 5-4 the Act was unconstitutional for the following reasons:

- Just because a commodity is manufactured or produced within a state and is intended for interstate commerce does not mean that its "production or manufacturing is subject to federal regulation under the commerce clause."
- A commodity that is meant to be sold in interstate commerce is not considered to be part of interstate commerce "before the commencement of its movement from the state."
- "Mining is not interstate commerce." It is a local business and is subject to local control and taxation.
- The word "commerce" is equivalent to the phrase "intercourse for the purposes of trade" and the process of mining coal is not within that definition.
- The labor board has powers over production, not commerce. That confirms the idea that production is a purely-local activity.
- If the production of coal by a single person did not have a direct effect on interstate commerce, the production of coal by many people also could not have a direct effect on interstate commerce.
- The evils that Congress sought to control were "all local evils over which the federal government has no legislative control."
- "The federal regulatory power ceases when interstate commerce ends; and, the power does not attach until interstate commercial intercourse begins."

=== Dissenting opinions ===
The Three Musketeers dissented.

Justice Cardozo, dissenting, reasoned that the price-fixing provision of the Coal Conservation Act was constitutional because it had a direct effect on interstate trade. Justices Stone and Brandeis joined Cardozo's opinion.

Chief Justice Hughes also wrote a separate opinion, agreeing with the other five justices that the Act's labor provision was unconstitutional because it was poorly drafted and did not fall within the jurisdiction of Congress to regulate interstate commerce. However, he mainly sided with Cardozo's opinion and noted that the Act's labor and marketing provisions were not dependent on each other. On April 12, 1937, however, Hughes, who wrote the majority opinion, later found the pro-labor Wagner Act constitutional in five separate cases and noted that it was skillfully drafted and specified interstate commerce regulations.

== See also ==
- Carter Coal Company Store (Caretta, West Virginia)
- Carter Coal Company Store (Coalwood, West Virginia)
- List of United States Supreme Court cases, volume 298
