= Saperstein =

Saperstein (compound of Hebrew sapir "sapphire" + German Stein "stone") is a surname. Notable people with the surname include:

- Abe Saperstein (1902–1966), founder and coach of the Savoy Big Five, which later became the Harlem Globetrotters
- Abram Saperstein, changed his name to Albert Sabin (1906–1993), Polish-American medical researcher who developed an oral polio vaccine; President of the Weizmann Institute of Science
- David Saperstein (disambiguation)
- Esther Saperstein (1901–1988), American politician
- Harlan Saperstein, television narrator
- Larry Saperstein (born 1998), American actor

== Fictional entities ==
Fictional entities with the surname include:

- Dr. Lu Saperstein, a fictional obstetrician in Parks and Recreation, played by Henry Winkler
- Jean-Ralphio Saperstein, a fictional character in Parks and Recreation, played by Ben Schwartz
- Mona Lisa Saperstein, a fictional character in Parks and Recreation, played by Jenny Slate
