= Bridge Day =

Annual festival in West Virginia, US

Coordinates: 38°4.1′N 81°5.0′W

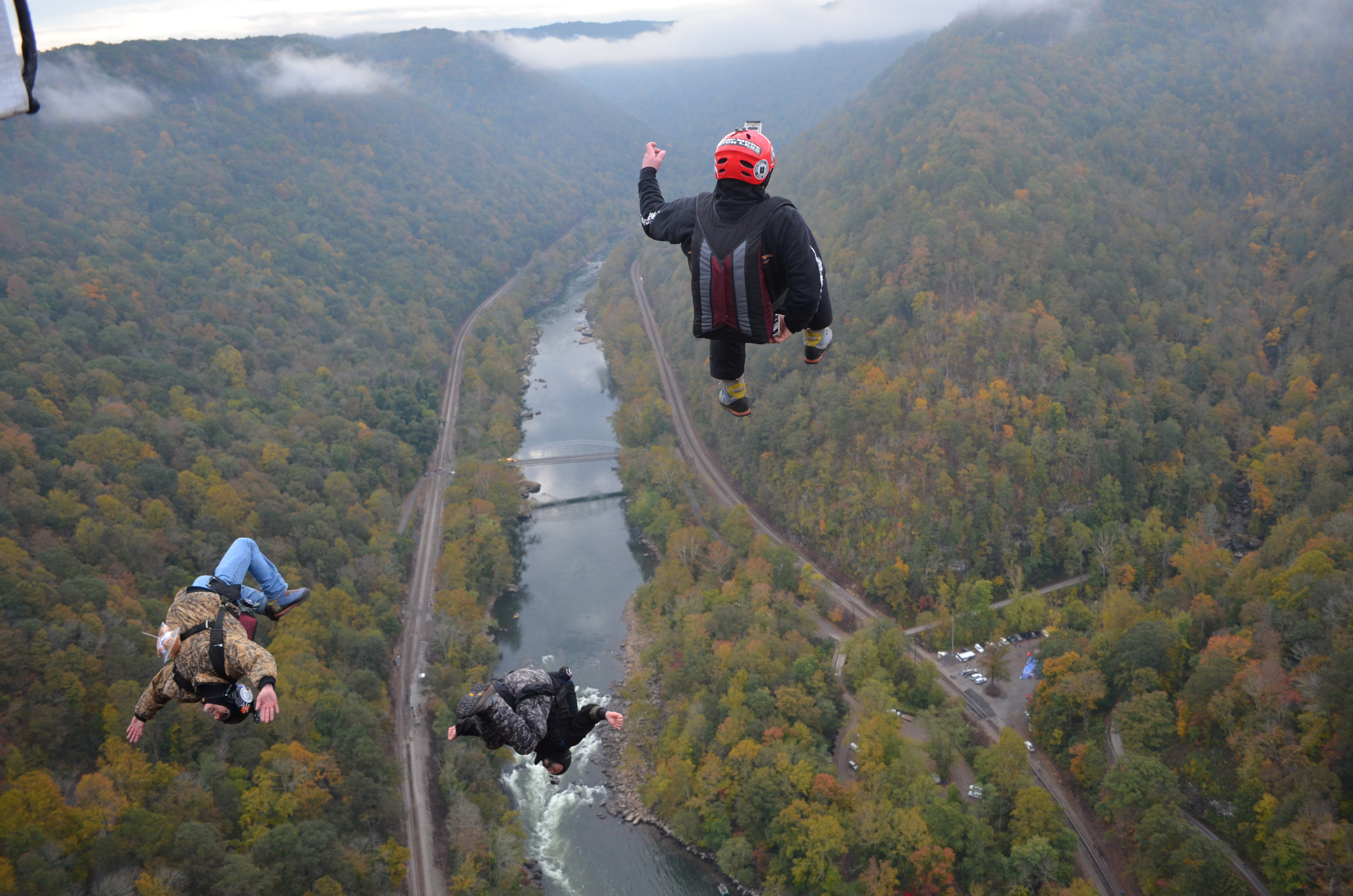
BASE jumpers jumping off the bridge

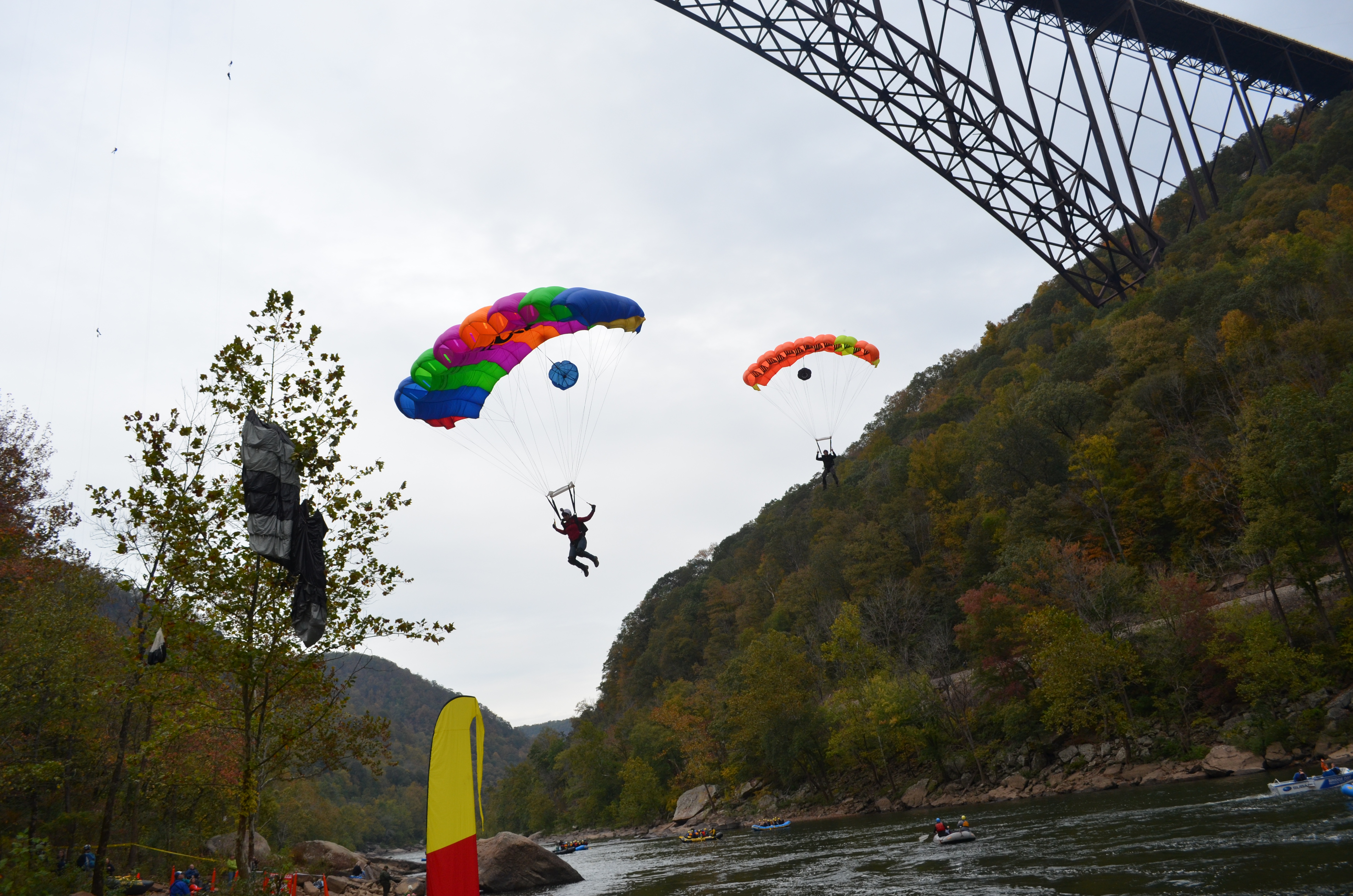
BASE jumpers landing

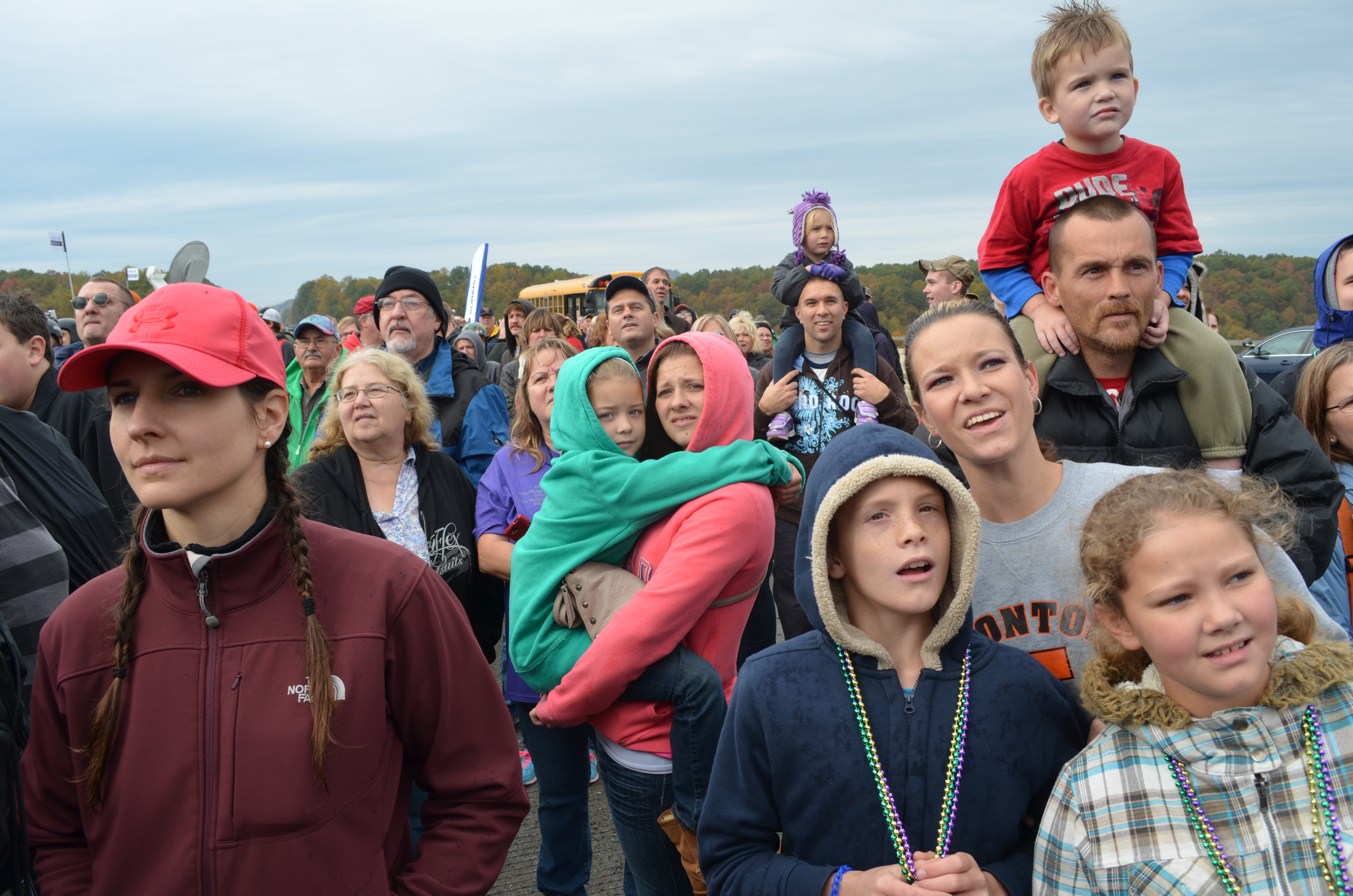
Crowds enjoying the festivities

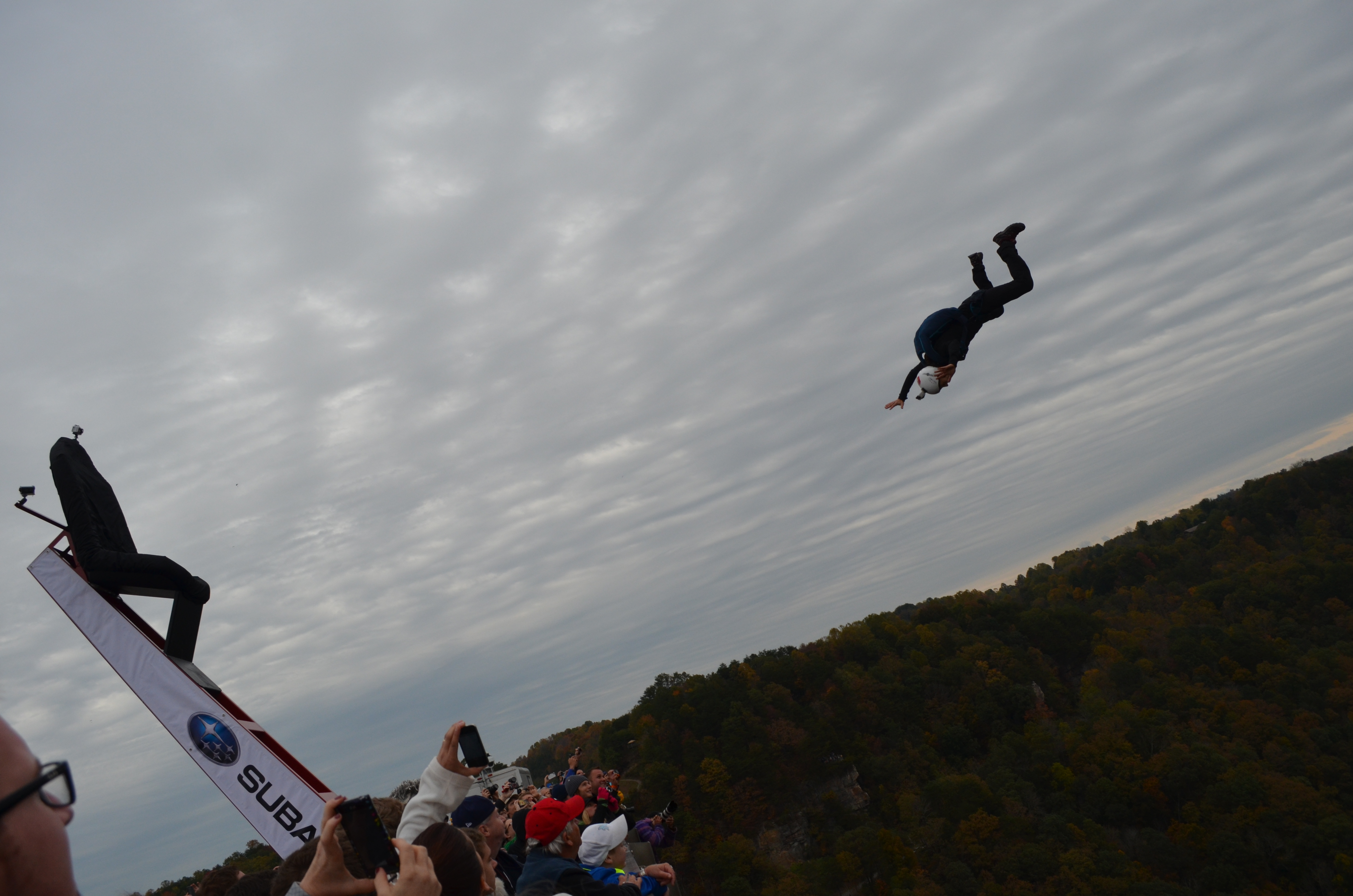
BASE jumpers shoot out of a catapult

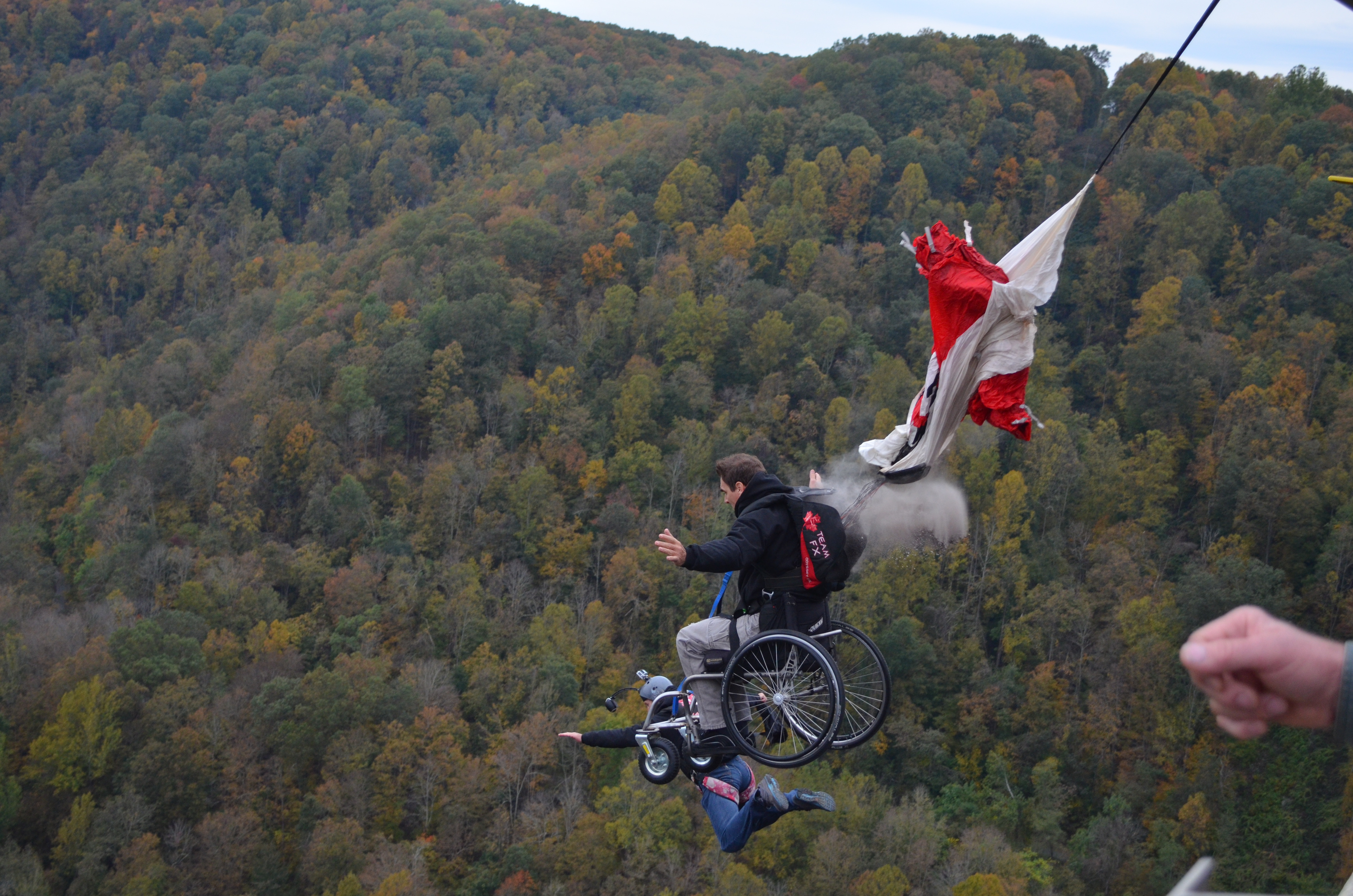
Base jumper in wheelchair

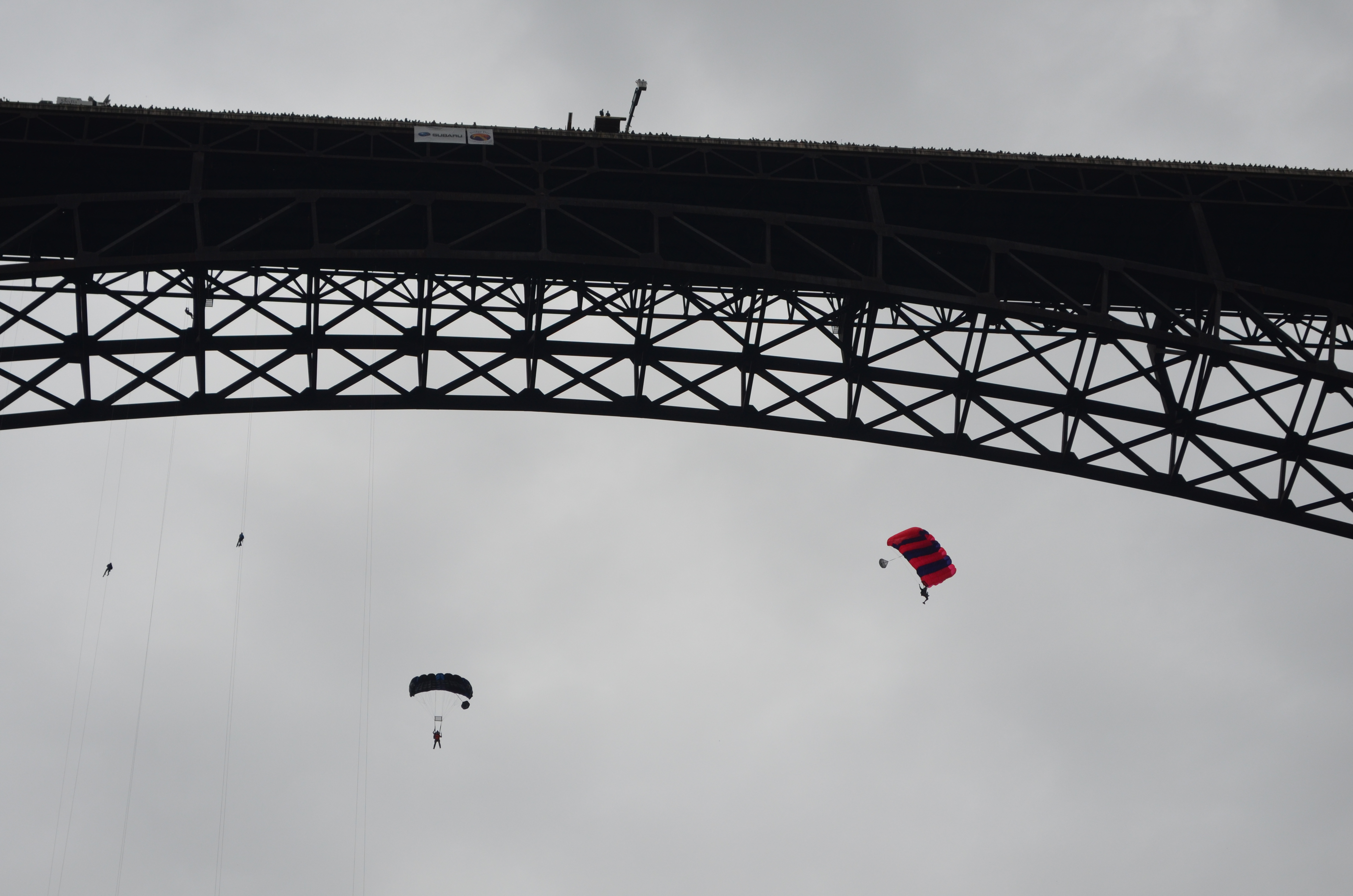
Base jumpers and rapellers

Bridge Day is an annual one-day festival in Fayetteville, Fayette County, West Virginia, United States The event is coordinated by the New River Gorge Bridge Day Commission, and is sponsored by numerous companies of both local and international significance. The event, held on the third Saturday every October, commemorates the 1977 completion of the New River Gorge Bridge. On this day, all four lanes of the bridge are closed to automobiles and opened to pedestrians. Estimates have 100,000 people attending the overall event.

The first Bridge Day was held in 1980 and drew a crowd of roughly 40,000. It has been held every year since except for these years: 2001, when it was cancelled because of recent events of 9/11 and the possibility of terrorist attacks; it was also cancelled in 2020 and 2021 due to impact of the COVID-19 pandemic.

== History ==
United States Army veteran Burton Ervin, considered the father of Bridge Day, jumped from the New River Gorge Bridge on August 17, 1979 at 10:20 p.m. with over 200 spectators in attendance. There is a plaque at the bridge commemorating the event.

== BASE jumping ==
Bridge Day is the only day of the year people are allowed to BASE jump off the bridge into the New River Gorge 876 feet (267 meters) below, one of the few exceptions to a general ban on BASE jumping within the U.S. National Park System. People are also allowed to rappel from the span on Bridge Day. About four hundred BASE jumpers participate in each year's festival. In 2015 the BASE jumping community boycotted the event.

There have been three deaths and a wingsuit accident during Bridge Day involving BASE jumpers:

- In 1983, Michael Glenn Williams from Birmingham, Alabama, drowned when his gear was caught in the current after he made a successful jump. The one rescue boat that was in the river at the time was busy with other jumpers, and could not make it to him. In later years, more than one rescue boat was always used, and parachutists were not allowed to jump until it was confirmed that one of the rescue boats was available.
- In 1987, Steven Gyrsting of Paoli, Pennsylvania, jumped using gear that was not BASE-specific gear and was killed after he was unable to open his reserve chute in time when his main chute failed to deploy.
- During the 2006 festival, Brian Lee Schubert died when he failed to deploy his parachute in time. In 1966, he had been one of the first to BASE jump from El Capitan in Yosemite National Park.
- In 2011, Christopher Brewer of Pensacola, Florida, jumped wearing a wingsuit and survived after failing to open his parachute in time. He was fully conscious and paralyzed after landing in the New River, 876 feet below.

== Rappelling ==
Rappelling off the bottom of the bridge has been part of the Bridge Day festivities since 1981.

== Bungee jumping ==
The first confirmed bungee jumper was stunt performer Skip Stanley also known as "Blue Bandit" who leapt from the bridge during the 1985 Bridge Day. In 1992, New Zealander Chris Allum, bungee jumped 823 ft (251 m) from the bridge to set a world's record for the longest bungee jump from a fixed structure, stopping about 40 feet above the river. Also in 1992 a GMC Jimmy SUV was dropped on a bungee for a commercial. In 1993, Chris Allum bungee jumped with six friends in a basket setting a world record for most people in a single bungee jump. However, considerable amount of time is required for bungee jumpers to be reeled back up, during which time BASE jumpers are not allowed to jump, prompting the banning of bungee jumping at Bridge Day since 1994.

== See also ==
- Mackinac Bridge Walk
