= Mackinac Bridge =

Suspension bridge in Michigan, US

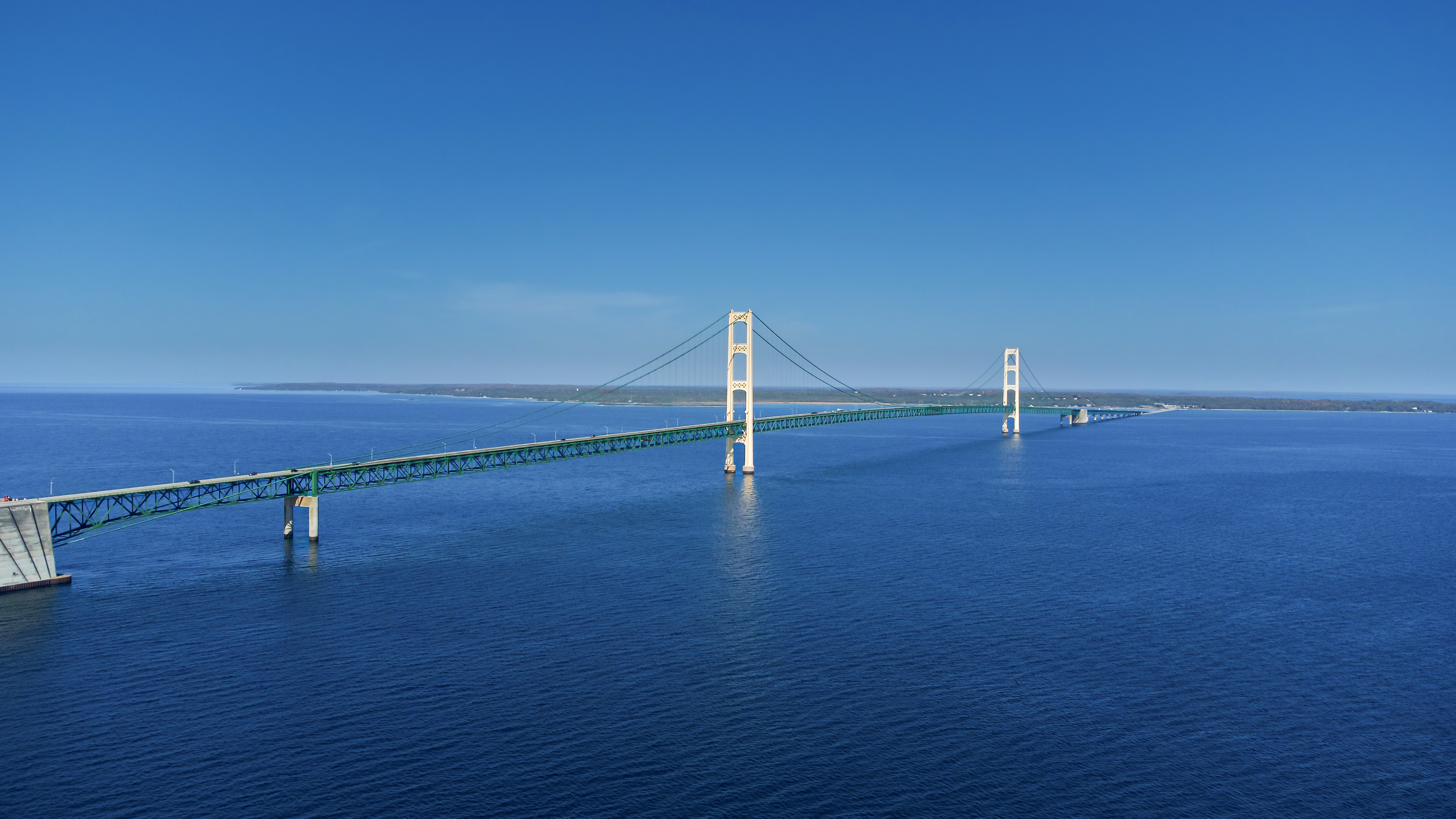
- Mackinac Bridge in October 2022
- Coordinates: 45.817059°N 84.727822°W
- Carries: 4 lanes of I-75 / GLCT
- Crosses: Straits of Mackinac
- Locale: St. Ignace and Mackinaw City, Michigan
- Other name: Mighty Mac or Big Mac
- Maintained by: Mackinac Bridge Authority

Characteristics
- Design: Suspension bridge
- Total length: 26,372 ft (8,038 m)
- Width: 68.6 ft (20.9 m) (total width); 54 ft (16 m) (road width); 38.1 ft (11.6 m) (depth)
- Height: 552 ft (168 m) (tower height); 200 ft (61 m) (deck height)
- Longest span: 3,800 ft (1,158 m)
- Clearance below: 155 ft (47 m)

History
- Designer: David B. Steinman
- Opened: November 1, 1957; 68 years ago

Statistics
- Daily traffic: 11,600
- Toll: $2.00 per axle for passenger vehicles ($4.00 per car). $5.00 per axle for motor homes, and commercial vehicles.

Location
- Interactive map of Mackinac Bridge

The Mackinac Bridge (/ˈmækənɔː/ MAK-ə-naw; also referred to as the Mighty Mac or Big Mac) is a suspension bridge that connects the Upper and Lower peninsulas of the U.S. state of Michigan. It spans the Straits of Mackinac, a body of water connecting Lake Michigan and Lake Huron, two of the Great Lakes. Opened in 1957, the 26,372-foot-long (4.995 mi; 8.038 km) bridge is the world's 32nd-longest main span and is the longest suspension bridge between anchorages in the Western Hemisphere. The Mackinac Bridge is part of Interstate 75 (I-75) and carries the Lake Michigan and Huron components of the Great Lakes Circle Tour across the straits; it is also a segment of the U.S. North Country National Scenic Trail. The bridge connects the city of St. Ignace to the north with the village of Mackinaw City to the south.

The concept of the bridge was imagined since the 1880s, but the bridge was finally created in 1957, designed by the engineer David B. Steinman, after decades of struggles to begin construction. The bridge has become a well-known symbol of the state of Michigan.

== Length ==
The bridge opened on November 1, 1957, connecting the two peninsulas that were before only linked by ferries. At the time of creation, the bridge was the world's longest suspension bridge between two anchorages.

It is still the longest suspension bridge with two towers between anchorages in the Western Hemisphere. Since its construction, longer anchorage-to-anchorage spans have been built in the Eastern Hemisphere, including the Akashi Kaikyō Bridge in Japan (6,532 ft or 1,991 m).

The length of the bridge's main span is 3,800 feet (1,158 m), which makes it the third-longest suspension span in the United States and 32nd longest suspension span worldwide.

== History ==
=== Early history ===
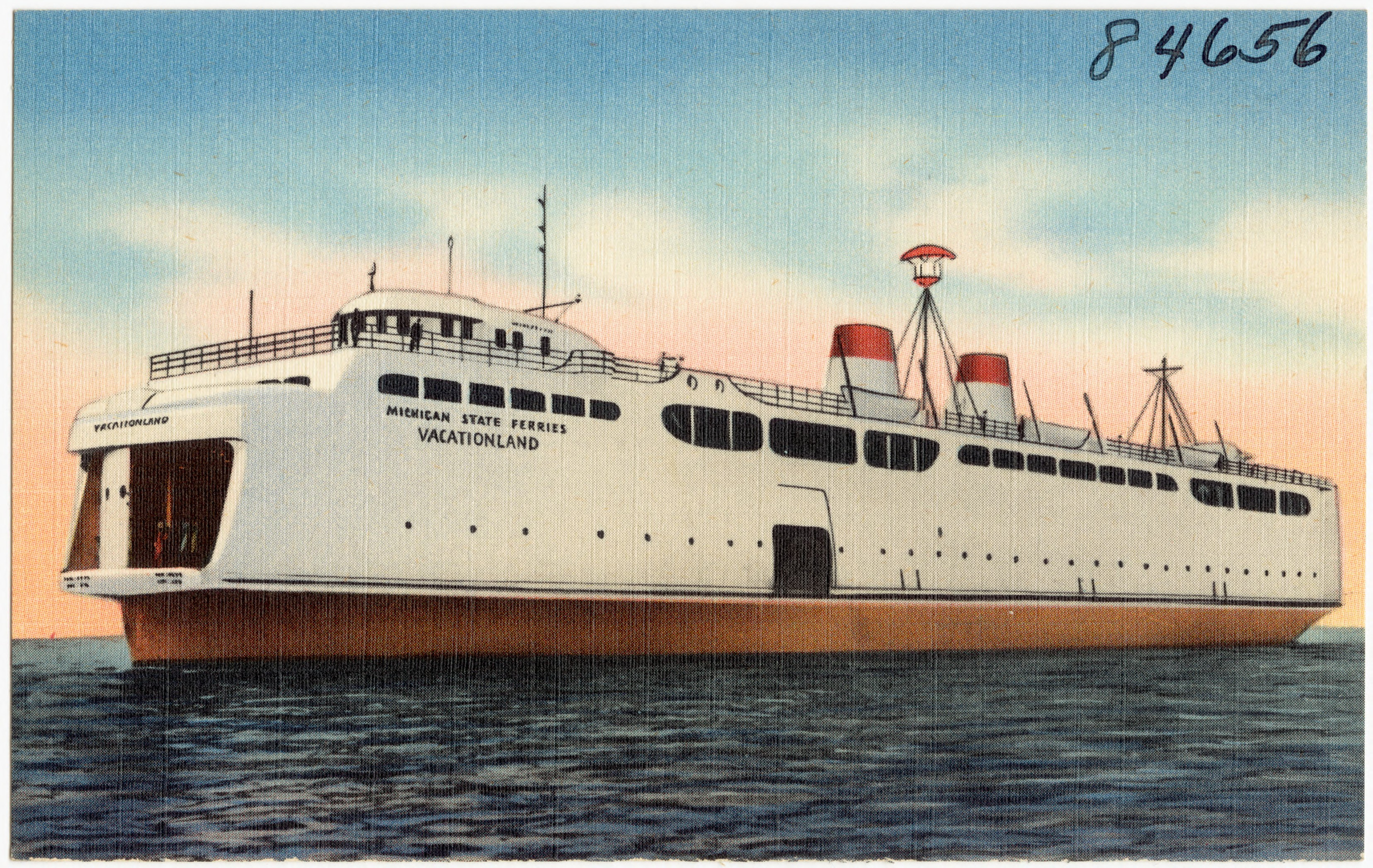
Vacationland, the largest and last Michigan State Highway Department automobile ferry put in service prior to the completion of the Mackinac Bridge

The Algonquian peoples who lived in the straits area prior to the arrival of the Europeans in the 17th century originally called this region Michilimackinac, which is widely understood to mean Place of the Great Turtle. Trading posts at the Straits of Mackinac attracted peak populations during the summer trading season; they also developed as intertribal meeting places.

As usage of the state's mineral and timber resources increased during the 19th century, the area became an important transport hub. In 1881 the three railroads that reached the Straits, the Michigan Central, Grand Rapids & Indiana, and the Detroit, Mackinac & Marquette, jointly established the Mackinac Transportation Company to operate a railroad car ferry service across the straits and connect the two peninsulas.

Improved highways along the eastern shores of the Lower Peninsula brought increased automobile traffic to the Straits region starting in the 1910s. The state of Michigan initiated an automobile ferry service between Mackinaw City and St. Ignace in 1923; it eventually operated nine ferry boats that would carry as many as 9,000 vehicles per day. Traffic backups could stretch as long as 16 miles (26 km).

=== Initial bridge plans ===
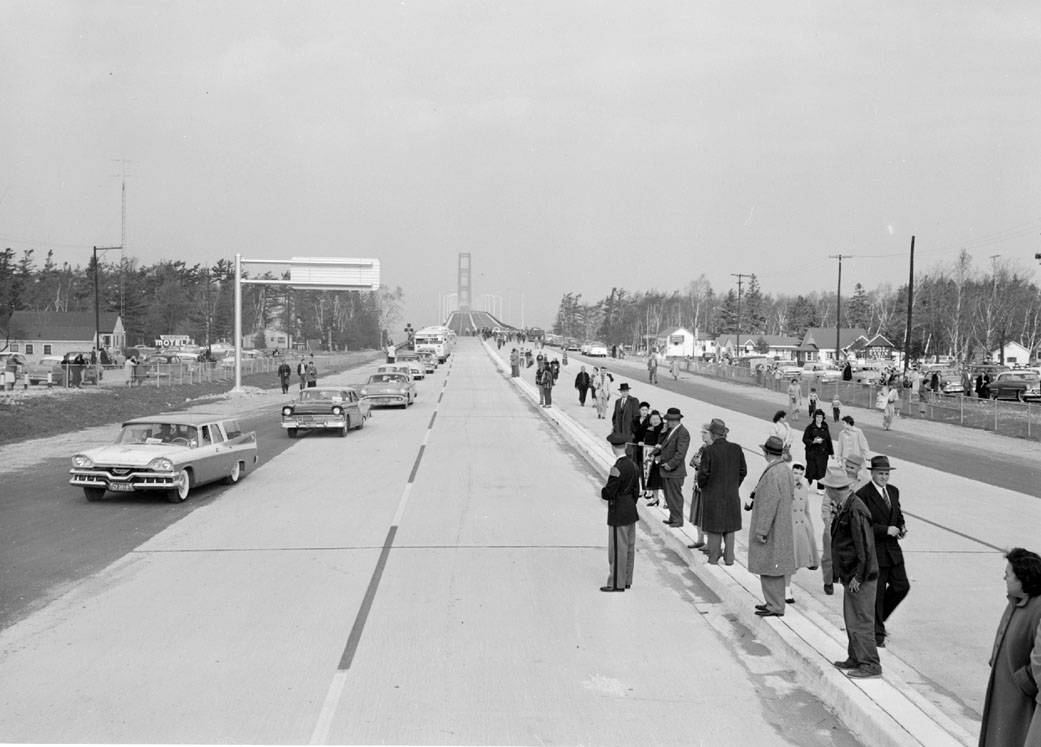
Bridge's opening on November 1, 1957

After the opening of the Brooklyn Bridge in 1883, William Saulson, the mayor of St. Ignace and owner of The People's Store, published a newspaper advertisement in 1884 that included a reprint of an artist's conception of the Brooklyn Bridge with the caption "Proposed bridge across the Straits of Mackinac".

At the time, the Straits of Mackinac area was becoming a popular tourist destination, especially following the creation of Mackinac National Park on Mackinac Island in 1875.

At a July 1888 meeting of the board of directors of the Grand Hotel on Mackinac Island, Cornelius Vanderbilt II proposed that a bridge be built across the straits, of a design similar to the one then under construction across the Firth of Forth in Scotland. This would advance commerce in the region and help lengthen the resort season of the hotel.

Decades went by with no formal action. In 1920, the Michigan state highway commissioner advocated construction of a floating tunnel across the Straits. At the invitation of the state legislature, C. E. Fowler of New York City put forth a plan for a long series of causeways and bridges across the straits from Cheboygan, 17 miles (27 km) southeast of Mackinaw City, to St. Ignace, using Bois Blanc, Round, and Mackinac islands as intermediate steps.

=== Formal plans ===
In 1923, the state legislature ordered the State Highway Department to establish ferry service across the strait. More and more people used ferries to cross the straits each year, and as they did, the movement to build a bridge increased. Chase Osborn, a former governor, wrote:

Michigan is unifying itself, and a magnificent new route through Michigan to Lake Superior and the Northwest United States is developing, via the Straits of Mackinac. It cannot continue to grow as it ought with clumsy and inadequate ferries for any portion of the year.

By 1928, the ferry service had become so popular and so expensive to operate that Governor Fred W. Green ordered the department to study the feasibility of building a bridge across the strait. The department deemed the idea feasible, estimating the cost at $30 million (equivalent to $432 million in 2024).

In 1934, the Michigan Legislature created the Mackinac Straits Bridge Authority to explore possible methods of constructing and funding the proposed bridge. The Legislature authorized the Authority to seek financing for the project. In the mid-1930s, during the Great Depression, when numerous infrastructure projects received federal aid, the Authority twice attempted to obtain federal funds for the project but was unsuccessful. The United States Army Corps of Engineers and President Franklin D. Roosevelt endorsed the project but Congress never appropriated funds. Between 1936 and 1940, the Authority selected a route for the bridge based on preliminary studies. Borings were made for a detailed geological study of the route.

At that time, with funding for the project still uncertain, further work was put on hold because of the outbreak of World War II. The Mackinac Straits Bridge Authority was abolished by the state legislature in 1947, but the same body created a new Mackinac Bridge Authority three years later in 1950. In June 1950, engineers were retained for the project. By then, it was reported that cars queuing for the ferry at Mackinaw City did not reach St. Ignace until five hours later, and the typical capacity of 460 vehicles per hour could not match the estimated 1,600 for a bridge.

After a report by the engineers in January 1951, the state legislature authorized the sale of $85 million (equivalent to $804 million in 2024) in bonds for bridge construction on April 30, 1952. However, a weak bond market in 1953 forced a delay of more than a year before the bonds could be issued.

=== Engineering and construction ===
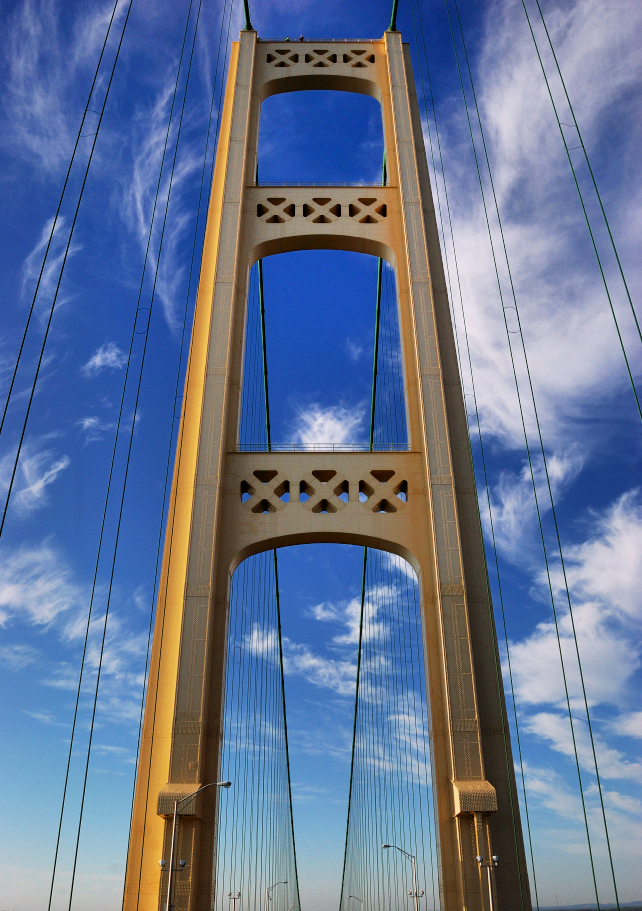
The north tower of the bridge

David B. Steinman was appointed as the design engineer in January 1953 and by the end of 1953, estimates and contracts had been negotiated. A civil engineer at the firm, Abul Hasnat, did the preliminary plans for the bridge. Total cost estimate at that time was $95 million (equivalent to $887 million in 2024) with estimated completion by November 1, 1956. Tolls collected were to pay for the bridge in 20 years. Construction began on May 7, 1954. The bridge was built under two major contracts. The Merritt-Chapman and Scott Corporation of New York was awarded the contract for all major substructure work for $25.7 million (equivalent to $240 million in 2024), while the American Bridge Division of United States Steel Corporation was awarded a contract of more than $44 million (equivalent to $407 million in 2024) to build the steel superstructure.

Construction, staged using the 1939–1941 causeway, took three and a half years (four summers, no winter construction) at a total cost of $100 million and the lives of five workers. Contrary to popular belief, none of them are entombed in the bridge. It opened to traffic on schedule on November 1, 1957, and the ferry service ceased on the same day. The bridge was formally dedicated on June 25, 1958.

G. Mennen Williams was governor during the construction of the Mackinac Bridge. Williams was the first to pay the toll (then $3.25, equivalent to $37.26 in 2025) to cross the bridge and rode on the Vacationland's last St. Ignace–Mackinaw City ferry trip about an hour later, and he later began the tradition of the governor leading the Mackinac Bridge Walk across it every Labor Day. Senator Prentiss M. Brown has been called the "father of the Mackinac Bridge", and was honored with a special memorial bridge token created by the Mackinac Bridge Authority.

The bridge officially achieved its 100 millionth crossing exactly 40 years after its dedication, on June 25, 1998. The 50th anniversary of the bridge's opening was celebrated on November 1, 2007, in a ceremony hosted by the Mackinac Bridge Authority at the viewing park adjacent to the St. Ignace causeway. The bridge was designated as a National Historic Civil Engineering Landmark by the American Society of Civil Engineers in 2010.

=== History of the bridge's design ===
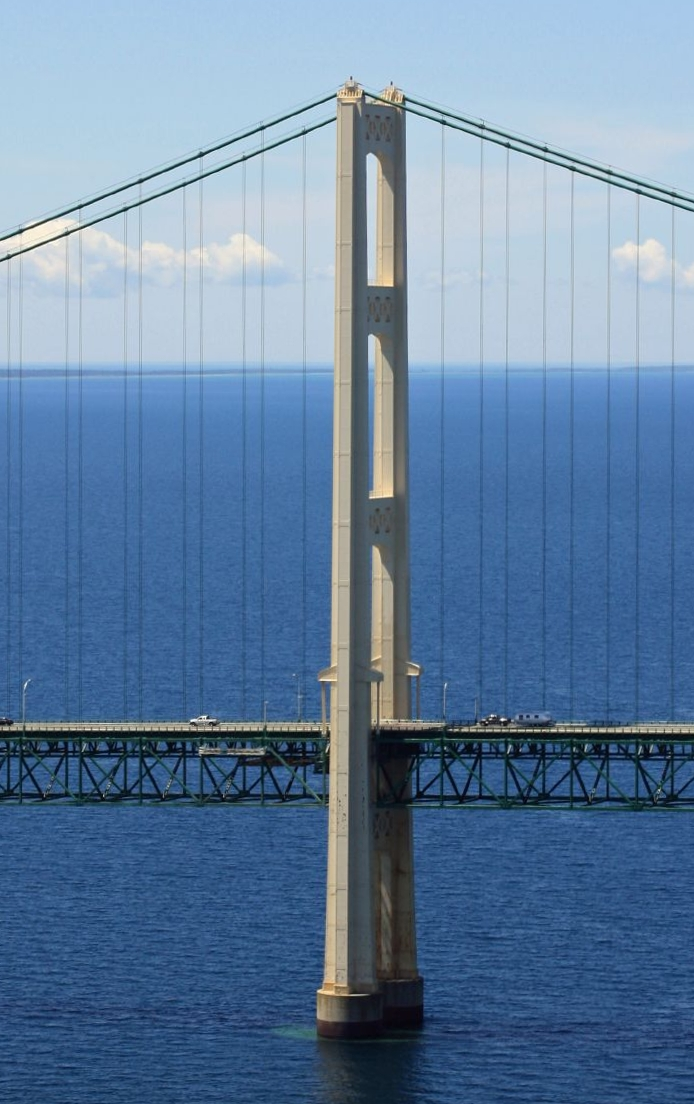
A bridge tower

The design of the Mackinac Bridge was directly influenced by the lessons from the first Tacoma Narrows Bridge, which failed in 1940 because of its instability in high winds. Three years after that disaster, Steinman had published a theoretical analysis of suspension-bridge stability problems, which recommended that future bridge designs include deep stiffening trusses to support the bridge deck and an open-grid roadway. Both of these features were incorporated into the design of the Mackinac Bridge and increase the bridge's critical wind velocity.

== Facts and figures ==
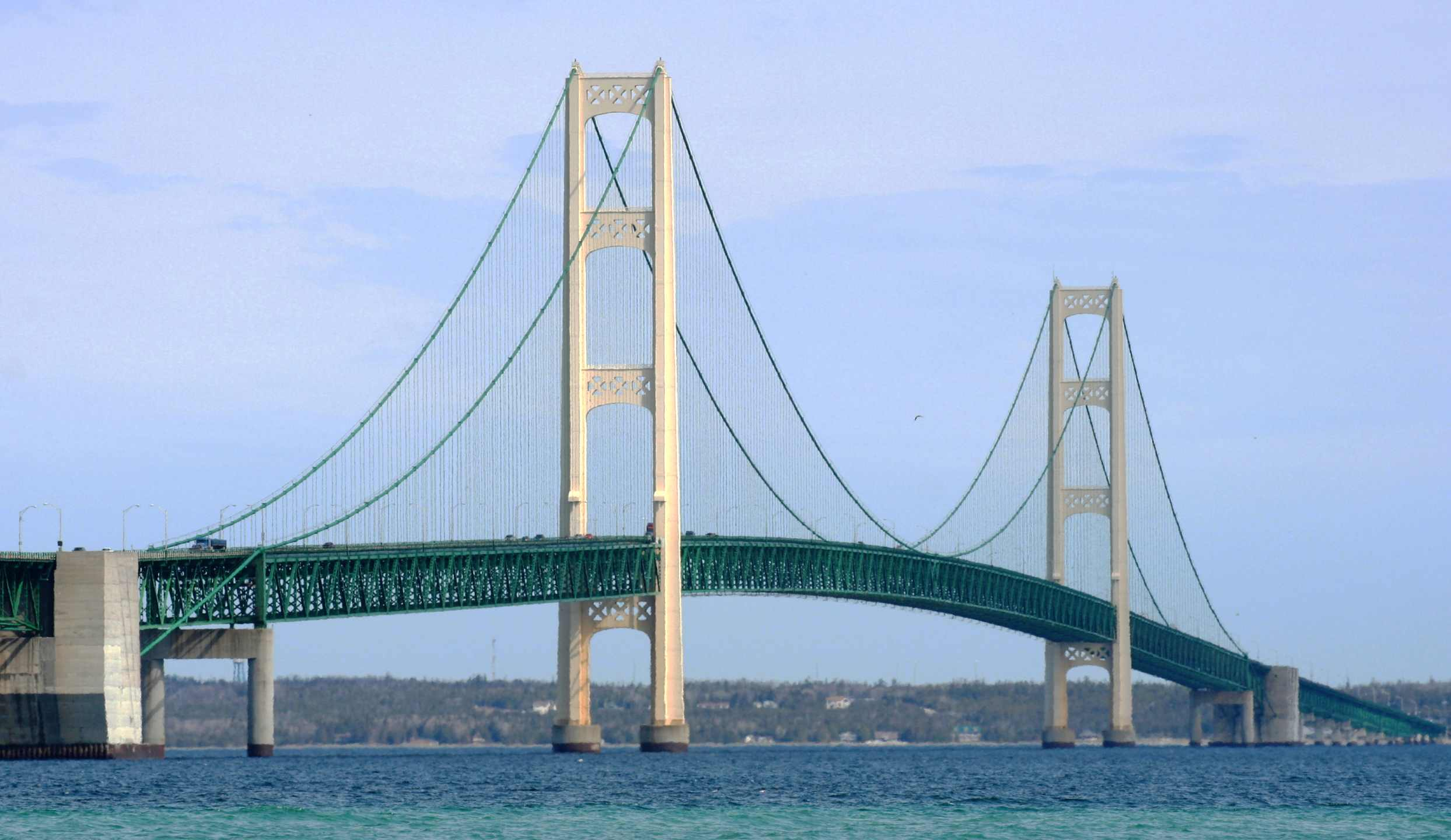
The Mackinac Bridge from the south shore

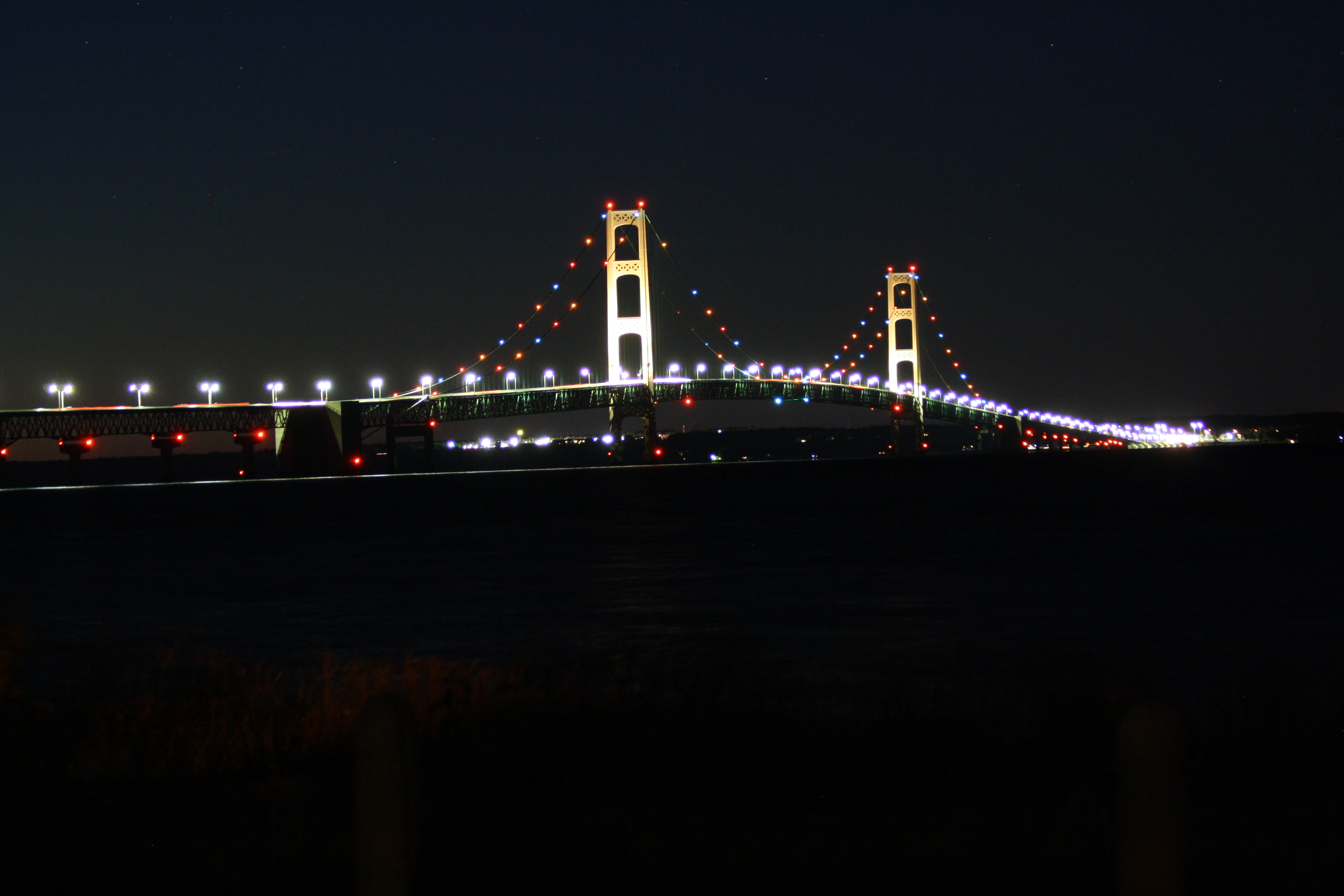
The Mackinac Bridge at night

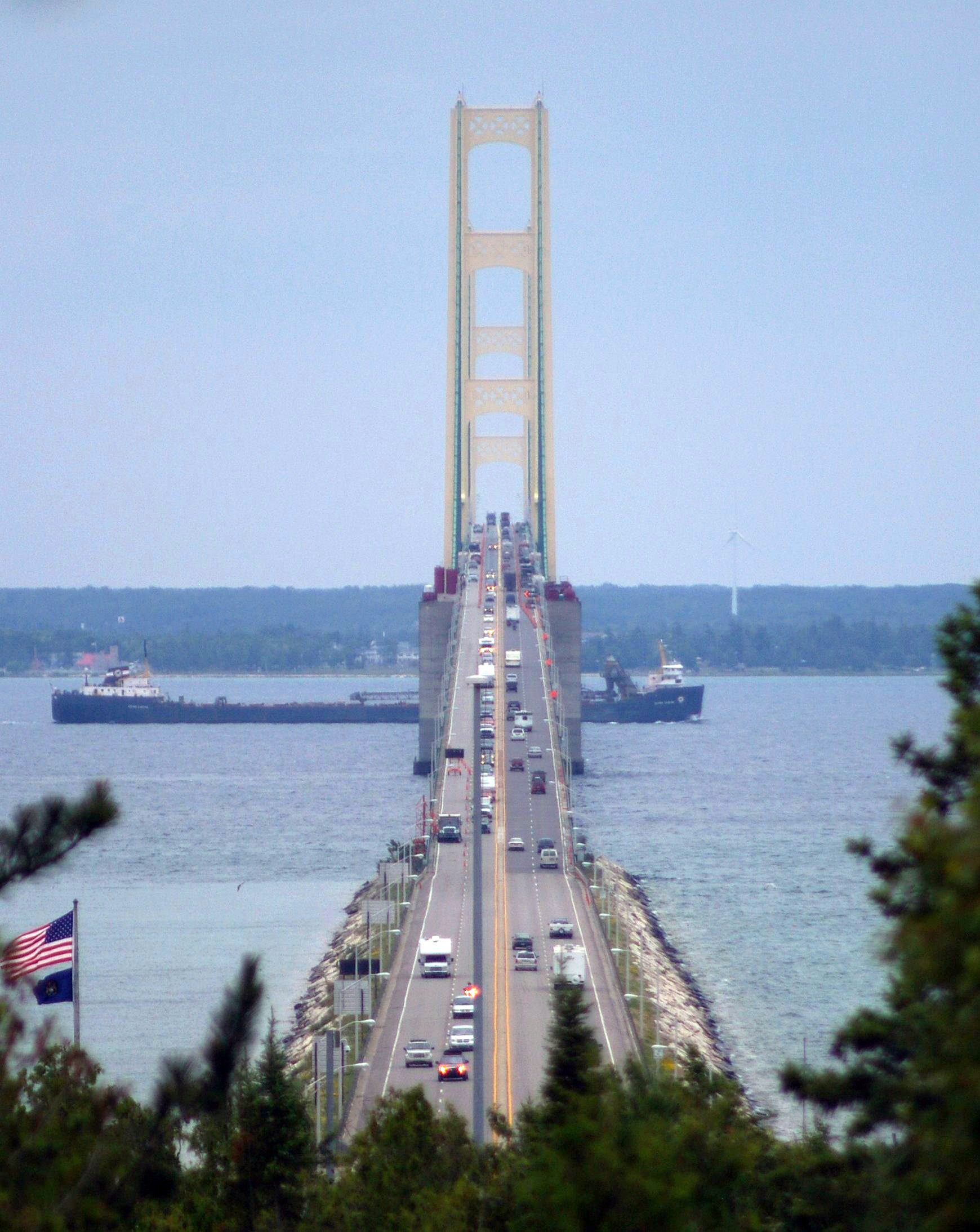
Freighter passing under the bridge, looking towards the Lower Peninsula from Straits State Park

The Mackinac Bridge is a toll bridge on Interstate 75 (I-75). The US Highway 27 (US 27) designation was initially extended across the bridge. In November 1960, sections of I-75 freeway opened from Indian River north to the southern bridge approaches in Mackinaw City, and US 27 was removed from the bridge. It is one of only three segments of I-75 that are tolled, the others being the American half of the International Bridge near Sault Ste. Marie, Michigan, and Alligator Alley in Florida. The current toll is $4.00 for automobiles and $5.00 per axle for trucks. The Mackinac Bridge Authority raised the toll in 2007 to fund a $300 million renovation program, which would include completely replacing the bridge deck.

Prior to 1999, painting of the bridge would take seven years, and a new coat of paint would begin when the old one was complete. In 1999 a full refurbishment was begun involving stripping the bridge down to its original steel, which was expected to take 20 years to complete because it included safe removal and disposal of the previous coats of lead-based paint. The project moved on to the bridge's iconic towers in 2017, and the project finished in 2020. The modern zinc-based paint is expected to last 35 years, removing the need for continuous re-painting projects.

The bridge celebrated its 150 millionth vehicle crossing on September 6, 2009.

- Length from cable bent pier to cable bent pier: 7,400 feet (2,256 m).
- Total width of the roadway: 54 feet (16.5 m)
  - Two outside lanes: 12 feet (3.7 m) wide each
  - Two inside lanes: 11 feet (3.4 m) wide each
  - Center mall: 2 feet (0.61 m)
  - Catwalk, curb and rail width: 3 feet (0.91 m) on each side
- Width of stiffening truss in the suspended span: 68 feet (20.7 m).
- Depth of stiffening truss: 38.1 feet (11.6 m)
- Height of the roadway at mid-span: approximately 200 feet (61 m) above water level.
- Vertical clearance at normal temperature:
  - 155 feet (47 m) at the center of the main suspension span.
  - 135 feet (41 m) at the boundaries of the 3,000-foot-wide (914 m) navigation channel.
- Construction cost: $99.8 million (equivalent to $850 million in 2024)
- Height of towers above water: 552 feet (168 m)
- Max. depth of towers below water: 210 feet (64 m)
- Depth of water beneath the center of the bridge, 250 feet (76 m)
- Main cables:
  - Number of wires in each cable: 12,580
  - Diameter of each wire: 0.196 inches (0.498 cm)
  - Diameter of each cable: 24.5 inches (62.23 cm)
  - Total length of wire in main cables: 42,000 miles (68,000 km).
- Total vehicle crossings, 2005: 4,236,491 (average 11,608 per day)
- Speed limit: 45 miles per hour (72 km/h) for passenger cars, 20 miles per hour (32 km/h) for heavy trucks. Heavy trucks are also required to leave a 500-foot (150 m) spacing ahead.

=== Work and major accident fatalities ===
Five workers died during the construction of the bridge:

- Diver Frank Pepper ascended too quickly from a depth of 140 feet (43 m) on September 16, 1954. Despite being rushed to a decompression chamber, the 46-year-old died from the bends.
- 26-year-old James LeSarge lost his balance on October 10, 1954, and fell into a caisson. He fell 40 feet (12 m) and likely died of head injuries caused by impact with the criss-crossing steel beams inside the caisson.
- Albert Abbott died on October 25, 1954. The forty-year-old fell four feet (1.2 m) into the water while working on an 18-inch (46 cm) wide beam. Witnesses speculate he suffered a heart attack.
- 28-year-old Jack Baker and 28-year-old Robert Koppen died in a catwalk collapse near the north tower on June 6, 1956; it was their first day on the job. Koppen's body was never recovered. Another man suffered a broken ankle.

All five men are memorialized on a plaque near the bridge's northern end (Bridge View Park). Contrary to folklore, no bodies are embedded in the concrete.

One worker has died since the bridge was completed. Daniel Doyle fell 60 to 70 feet (18 to 21 m) from scaffolding on August 7, 1997. He survived the fall but fell victim to the 50 °F (10 °C) water temperature. His body was recovered the next day in 95 feet (29 m) of water.

Two vehicles have fallen off the bridge:

- On September 22, 1989, Leslie Ann Pluhar died when her car, a 1987 Yugo, plunged over the 36-inch-high (91 cm) railing. High winds were initially blamed, which was not supported by recorded wind speed measurements taken on and around the bridge at the time of the accident. Later investigation showed the driver lost control due to excessive speed and her vehicle bumped the bridge's 4-inch-high median and then crossed back through the northbound lanes, hitting a curb, jumping an outer guardrail and falling off the bridge,
- On March 2, 1997, Richard Alan Daraban drove his car, a 1996 Ford Bronco, over the edge. It was later determined to be a suicide.

On September 10, 1978, a small private plane carrying United States Marine Corps Reserve officers Maj. Virgil Osborne, Capt. James Robbins, and Capt. Wayne W. Wisbrock smashed into one of the bridge's suspension cables while flying in a heavy fog. The impact tore the wings off the plane, which then plunged into the Straits of Mackinac. All three men were killed.

With the exception of the annual Mackinac Bridge Walk on Labor Day, the bridge is not accessible to pedestrians. As a result, suicides by jumping from the bridge have been rare. There have been roughly a dozen confirmed suicides by people jumping off the bridge as of 2026, with the most recent confirmed case having taken place in July of 2026. The official number is kept private, and the Mackinac Bridge Authority does not release specific statistics on this matter. No jumps have occurred during the annual bridge walks.

=== Crossing the bridge ===
Some individuals have difficulty crossing bridges, a phenomenon known as gephyrophobia. The Mackinac Bridge Authority has a Drivers Assistance Program that provides drivers for those with gephyrophobia, or anyone who is more comfortable having someone else drive them across. More than a thousand people use this service every year. Those interested can arrange, either by phone or with the toll collector, to have their cars or motorcycles driven to the other end. There is an additional fee for this service.

Bicycles and pedestrians are not permitted on the bridge. However, a program is offered to transport bicycles. Up until 2017, an exception was allowed for riders of two annual bicycle tours. A yearly exception is also made for pedestrians, see "Bridge Walk" below.

Travelers across the Mackinac Bridge can listen to an AM radio broadcast that recounts the history of the bridge and provides updates on driving conditions.

== Bridge Walk ==
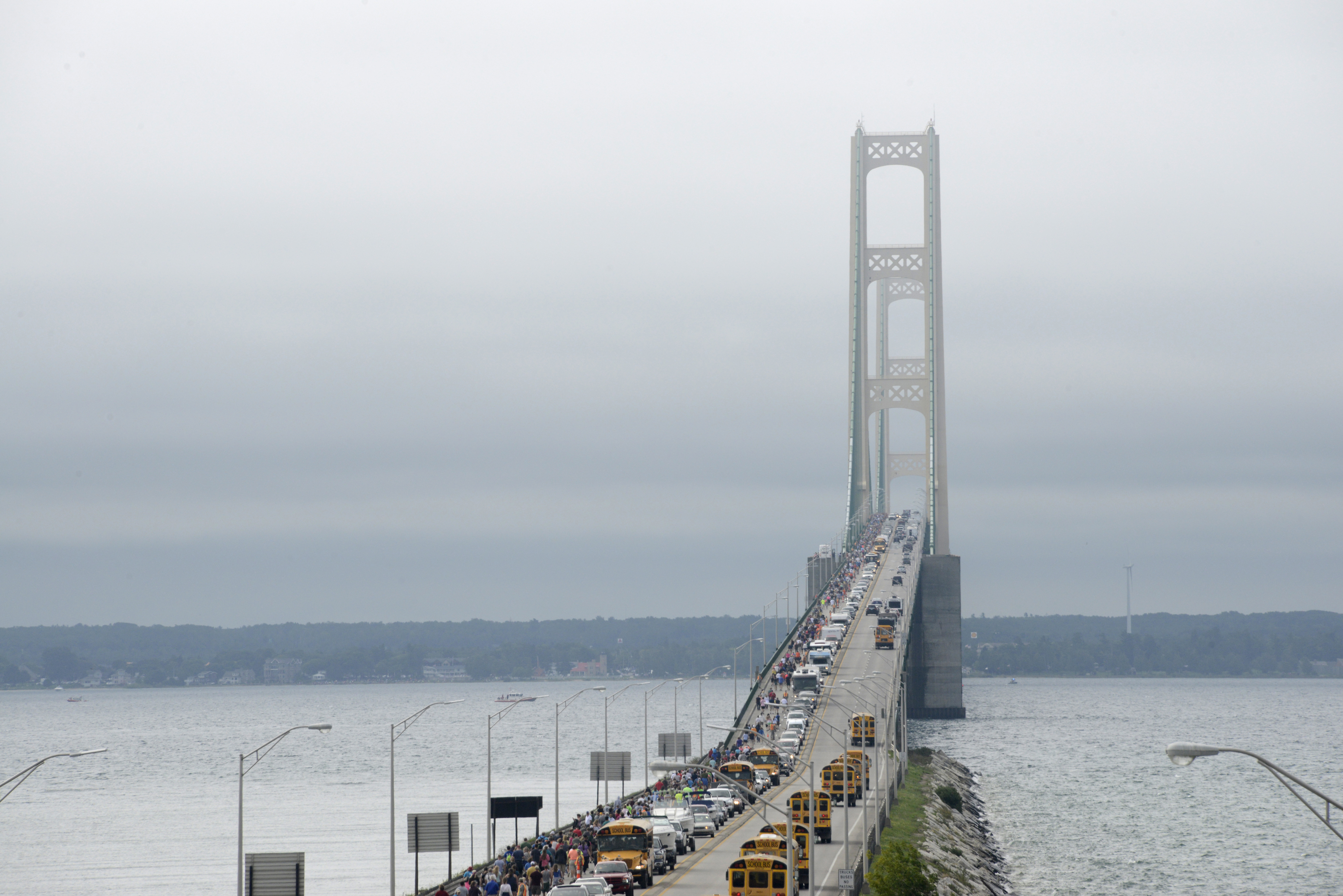
The 2015 Bridge Walk

The first Mackinac Bridge Walk was held in 1958, when it was led by Governor G. Mennen Williams. The first walk was held during the Bridge's Dedication Ceremony held in late June, and has been held on Labor Day since 1959. Until 2018, school buses from local districts transported walkers from Mackinaw City to St. Ignace to begin the walk. Thousands of people, traditionally led by the governor of Michigan, cross the five-mile (8 km) span on foot from St. Ignace to Mackinaw City. Before 1964, people walked the Bridge from Mackinaw City to St. Ignace. Prior to 2017, two lanes of the bridge would remain open to public vehicle traffic; this policy was changed in 2017 to close the entire bridge to public vehicle traffic for the duration of the event. The Bridge Walk is the only day of the year that hikers can hike this section of the North Country National Scenic Trail.

== Tourism ==
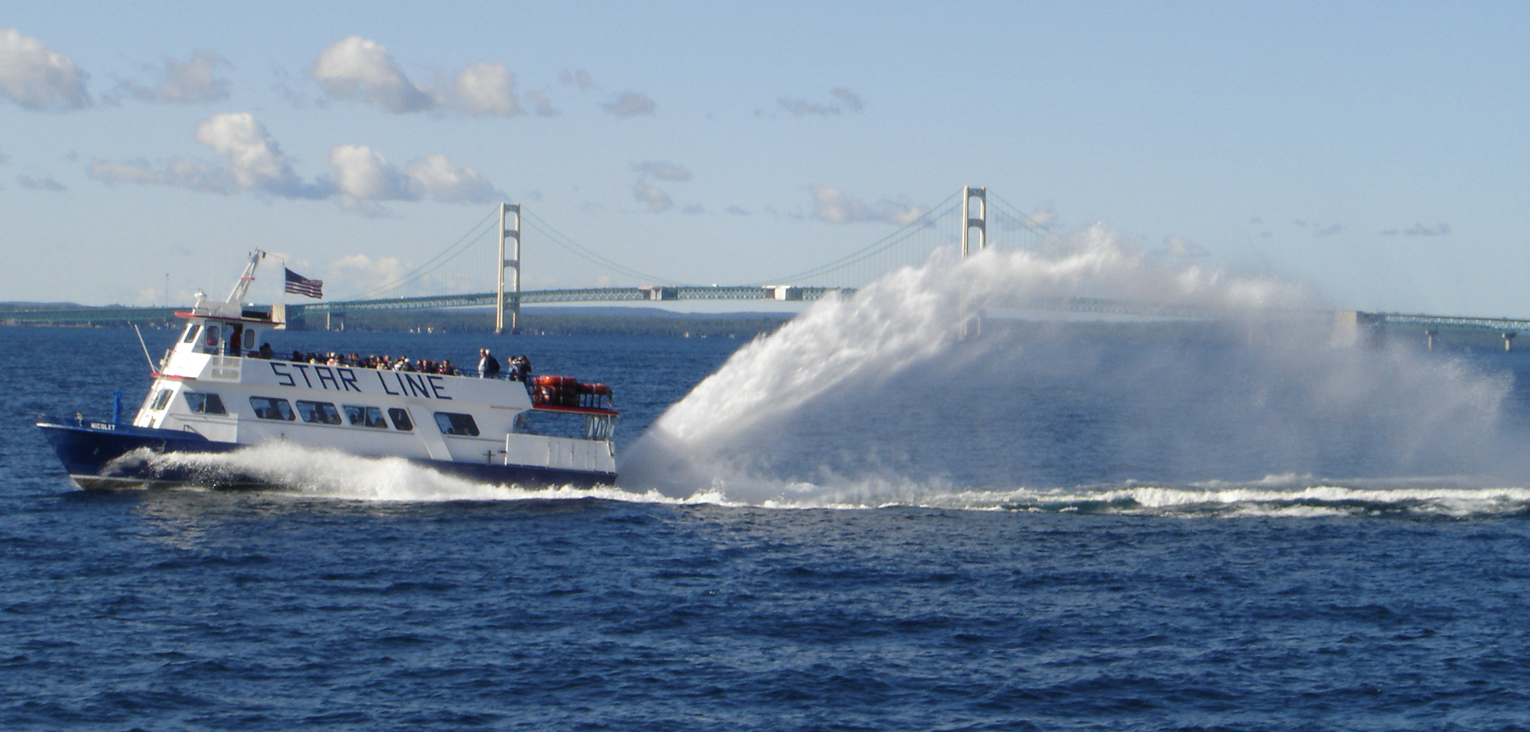
A Mackinac Island ferry passing in front of the Mackinac Bridge

During the summer months, the Upper Peninsula and Mackinac Bridge are major tourist destinations. In addition to visitors to Mackinac Island, the bridge has attracted interest from a diverse group of tourists including bridge enthusiasts, bird-watchers, and photographers. The Straits area is a popular sailing destination for boats of all types, which make it easier to get a closer view to the underlying structure of the bridge.

== In media ==
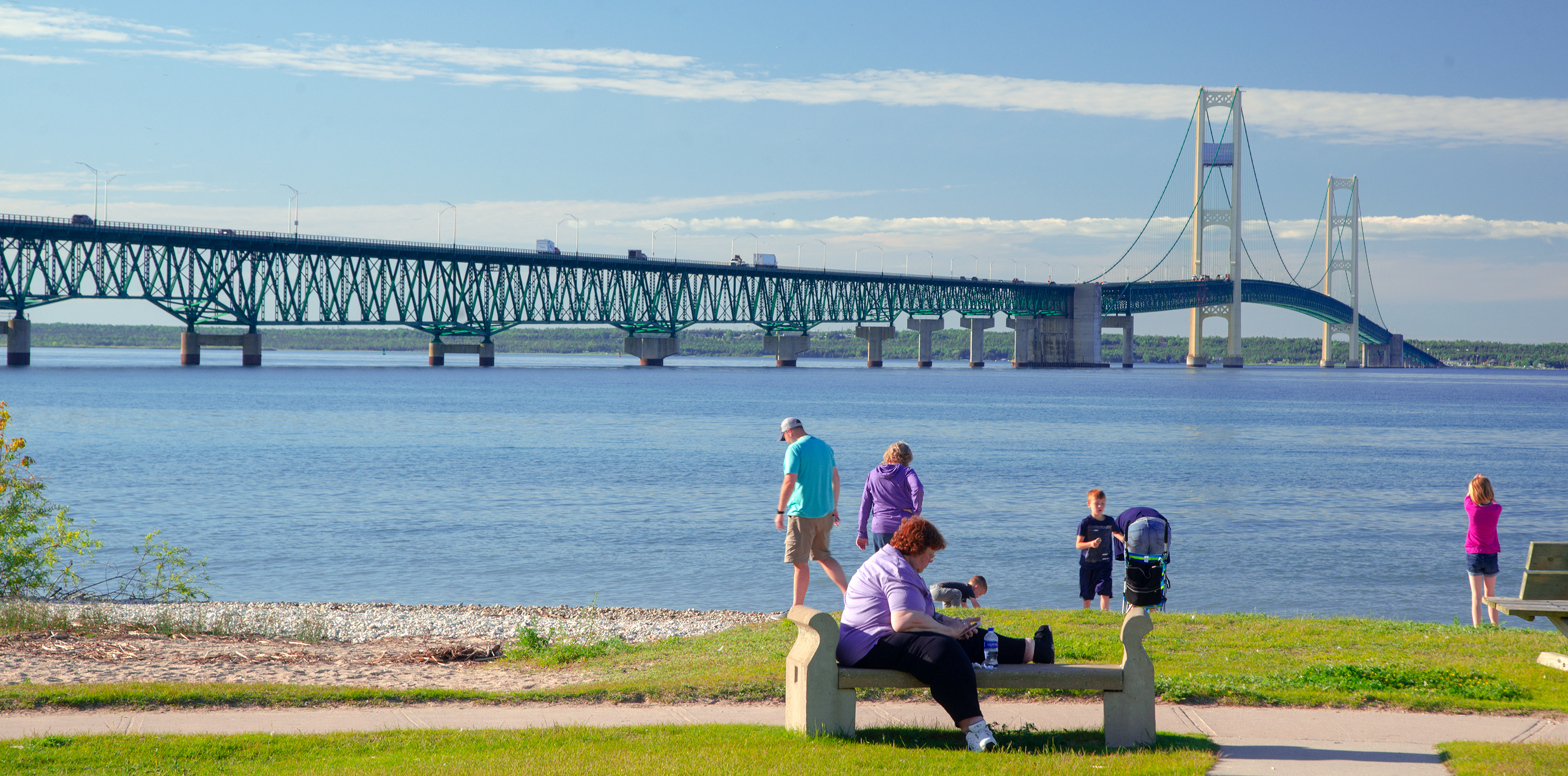
The bridge from Michilimackinac State Park, Mackinaw City

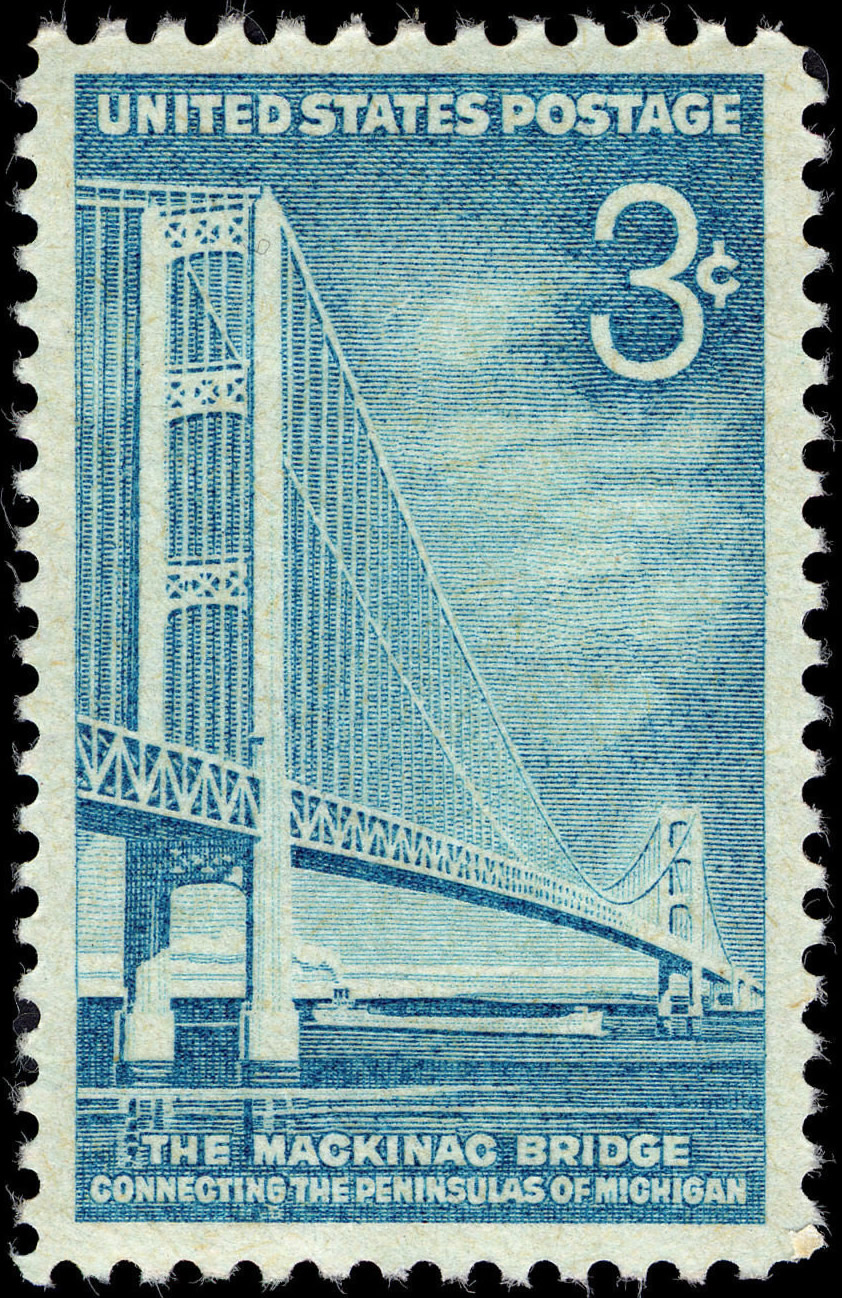
1958 U.S. postage stamp featuring the bridge

On June 25, 1958, to coincide with that year's celebration of the November 1957 opening, the United States Postal Service (USPS) released a 3¢ commemorative stamp featuring the recently completed bridge. It was entitled "Connecting the Peninsulas of Michigan" and 107,195,200 copies were issued. The USPS again honored the Mackinac Bridge as the subject of its 2010 priority mail $4.90 stamp, which went on sale February 3. The bridge authority and MDOT unveiled the stamp, which featured a "seagull's-eye view" of the landmark, with a passing freighter below. Artist Dan Cosgrove worked from panoramic photographs to create the artwork. This is one of several designs that Cosgrove has produced for the USPS.

On April 24, 1959, Captain John S. Lappo, an officer in the Strategic Air Command, operating from Lockbourne AFB flew his Boeing B-47 Stratojet beneath the bridge. Following a general court-martial, he was grounded for life.

A feature-length documentary entitled Building the Mighty Mac was produced by Hollywood filmmaker Mark Howell in 1997 and was shown on PBS. The program features numerous interviews with the key people who built the structure and includes restored 16mm color footage of the bridge's construction.

The history and building of the bridge was featured in a 2003 episode of the History Channel TV show Modern Marvels.

On July 19, 2007, the Detroit Science Center unveiled an 80-foot-long (24 m), 19-foot-tall (5.8 m) scale model of the Mackinac Bridge. The exhibit was part of the state's 50th anniversary celebration of the bridge. Sherwin-Williams supplied authentic Mackinac Bridge-colored paint for the project.

The bridge and its maintenance crew were featured in an episode of the Discovery Channel TV show Dirty Jobs on August 7, 2007. Host Mike Rowe and crew spent several days filming the episode in May 2007.

MDOT also featured the bridge on the cover of the 2007 state highway map to celebrate its 50th anniversary.

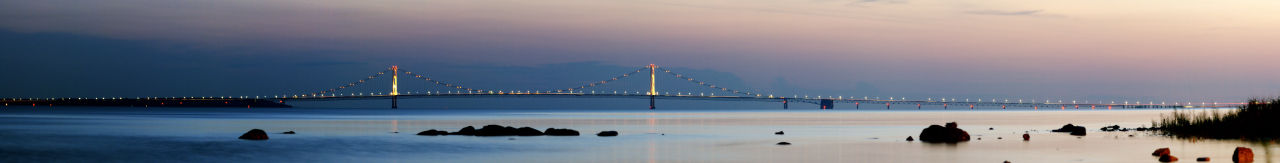
2008 panorama of the bridge from Mackinac Island

== See also ==
- List of longest suspension bridge spans
