= List of Modern Marvels episodes =

This is an episode list of the long-running documentary television series Modern Marvels.

== Series overview ==
| Season | Episodes | Originally released | |
| Season | Episodes | First released | Last released |
|---|---|---|---|
| 1 | 4 | December 10, 1993 | May 29, 1994 |
| 2 | 29 | January 15, 1995 | June 22, 1997 |
| 3 | 16 | August 17, 1997 | February 14, 1998 |
| 4 | 29 | August 3, 1998 | February 22, 1999 |
| 5 | 34 | March 3, 1999 | December 13, 1999 |
| 6 | 46 | February 3, 2000 | December 18, 2000 |
| 7 | 65 | January 3, 2001 | December 1, 2001 |
| 8 | 50 | December 2, 2002 | December 17, 2002 |
| 9 | 59 | January 7, 2003 | December 23, 2003 |
| 10 | 69 | February 4, 2004 | December 28, 2004 |
| 11 | 60 | January 12, 2005 | December 30, 2005 |
| 12 | 54 | January 4, 2006 | December 20, 2006 |
| 13 | 44 | January 17, 2007 | December 26, 2007 |
| 14 | 38 | January 14, 2008 | December 23, 2008 |
| 15 | 33 | October 28, 2009 | December 29, 2010 |
| 16 | 22 | January 14, 2011 | February 27, 2012 |
| 17 | 10 | July 16, 2012 | June 15, 2014 |
| 18 | 8 | February 21, 2021 | April 11, 2021 |
| 19 | 4 | July 25, 2021 | August 15, 2021 |
| 20 | 2 | November 28, 2021 | December 5, 2021 |
| 21 | 15 | February 16, 2022 | August 8, 2022 |

== Episodes ==
=== Season 1 (1993–94) ===
| No. overall | No. in season | Title | Original release date |
|---|---|---|---|
| 1 | 1 | "Grand Coulee Dam" | December 10, 1993 |
| 2 | 2 | "Empire State Building" | January 21, 1994 |
| 3 | 3 | "Panama Canal" | March 4, 1994 |
| 4 | 4 | "Mt. Rushmore" | May 29, 1994 |

=== Season 2 (1995–97) ===
| No. overall | No. in season | Title | Original release date |
|---|---|---|---|
| 5 | 1 | "Las Vegas" | January 15, 1995 |
| 6 | 2 | "Eiffel Tower" | January 22, 1995 |
| 7 | 3 | "Domed Stadiums" | February 5, 1995 |
| 8 | 4 | "Statue of Liberty" | February 18, 1995 |
| 9 | 5 | "Ocean Liners" | February 26, 1995 |
| 10 | 6 | "Tunnels" | March 5, 1995 |
| 11 | 7 | "Gothic Cathedrals" | March 19, 1995 |
| 12 | 8 | "Monuments to Freedom: The People's House" | March 21, 1995 |
| 13 | 9 | "Space Shuttle" | April 23, 1995 |
| 14 | 10 | "Golden Gate Bridge" | May 21, 1995 |
| 15 | 11 | "Brooklyn Bridge" | October 1, 1995 |
| 16 | 12 | "The Tennessee Valley Authority" | October 15, 1995 |
| 17 | 13 | "The Paving of America" | October 29, 1995 |
| 18 | 14 | "Oil" | November 19, 1995 |
| 19 | 15 | "Silver Mines" | January 14, 1996 |
| 20 | 16 | "Trans-Continental Railroad" | February 4, 1996 |
| 21 | 17 | "The Railroads that Tamed the West" | February 4, 1996 |
| 22 | 18 | "The Edison Effect: The Phonograph" | September 8, 1996 |
| 23 | 19 | "The Edison Effect: The Electric Light" | September 8, 1996 |
| 24 | 20 | "The Edison Effect: The Motion Picture" | September 8, 1996 |
| 25 | 21 | "The Telephone" | September 15, 1996 |
| 26 | 22 | "Television: Window to the World" | October 20, 1996 |
| 27 | 23 | "The Computer" | November 24, 1996 |
| 28 | 24 | "The Camera" | December 15, 1996 |
| 29 | 25 | "Stealth Technology" | February 16, 1997 |
| 30 | 26 | "Pyramids: Majesty and Mystery" | March 23, 1997 |
| 31 | 27 | "Roller Coasters" | April 13, 1997 |
| 32 | 28 | "Observatories: Stonehenge To Space Telescopes" | June 8, 1997 |
| 33 | 29 | "The Great Wall Of China" | June 22, 1997 |

=== Season 3 (1997–98) ===
| No. overall | No. in season | Title | Original release date |
|---|---|---|---|
| 34 | 1 | "Satellites" | August 17, 1997 |
| 35 | 2 | "Radio: Out of Thin Air" | August 24, 1997 |
| 36 | 3 | "Great Towers in the Sky" | September 7, 1997 |
| 37 | 4 | "Household Wonders" | September 14, 1997 |
| 38 | 5 | "Radar" | September 21, 1997 |
| 39 | 6 | "Forensic Science: The Crime Fighter's Weapon" | September 28, 1997 |
| 40 | 7 | "Polio Vaccine" | October 5, 1997 |
| 41 | 8 | "The Stock Exchange" | October 12, 1997 |
| 42 | 9 | "Norad: The War Game Fortress" | October 19, 1997 |
| 43 | 10 | "Earth Movers" | October 27, 1997 |
| 44 | 11 | "International Airports" | October 28, 1997 |
| 45 | 12 | "Deep Sea Exploration: Challenging the Abyss" | November 3, 1997 |
| 46 | 13 | "The Alaskan Oil Pipeline" | November 4, 1997 |
| 47 | 14 | "Aqueducts: Man Made Rivers of Life" | January 4, 1998 |
| 48 | 15 | "American Steel: Built to Last" | January 18, 1998 |
| 49 | 16 | "Battlefield Engineering" | February 8, 1998 |

=== Season 4 (1998–99) ===
| No. overall | No. in season | Title | Original release date |
|---|---|---|---|
| 50 | 1 | "Aquariums" | July 27, 1998 |
| 51 | 2 | "Las Vegas Hotels" | August 3, 1998 |
| 52 | 3 | "The Great Bridge: 8 Miles Of Steel" | August 10, 1998 |
| 53 | 4 | "Trans-Atlantic Cable: 2,500 Miles of Copper" | August 17, 1998 |
| 54 | 5 | "Monumental Statues" | August 24, 1998 |
| 55 | 6 | "Plumbing: The Arteries Of Civilization" | September 2, 1998 |
| 56 | 7 | "U.S. Mints: Money Machines" | September 10, 1998 |
| 57 | 8 | "Helicopters" | September 14, 1998 |
| 58 | 9 | "World's Fairs: Visions of the Future" | September 24, 1998 |
| 59 | 10 | "Antibiotics: The Wonder Drugs" | September 28, 1998 |
| 60 | 11 | "The Police Car" | October 6, 1998 |
| 61 | 12 | "Medical Imaging: The Voyage Inward" | October 28, 1998 |
| 62 | 13 | "Sports Technology: Equipment" | November 3, 1998 |
| 63 | 14 | "Bombs" | November 9, 1998 |
| 64 | 15 | "Firefighting! The Arson Detectives" | November 16, 1998 |
| 65 | 16 | "Prosthetics" | November 23, 1998 |
| 66 | 17 | "Firefighting! Containing the Demon" | December 6, 1998 |
| 67 | 18 | "Weather Prediction" | December 7, 1998 |
| 68 | 19 | "Firefighting! Extreme Conditions" | December 10, 1998 |
| 69 | 20 | "Plastics" | December 14, 1998 |
| 70 | 21 | "Stereos" | December 16, 1998 |
| 71 | 22 | "Mail Delivery: Erasing The Miles" | December 23, 1998 |
| 72 | 23 | "Clocks" | December 28, 1998 |
| 73 | 24 | "Air Force One: A History" | January 4, 1999 |
| 74 | 25 | "The NYC Subway" | January 6, 1999 |
| 75 | 26 | "Airships" | January 18, 1999 |
| 76 | 27 | "Quest for Fitness" | January 25, 1999 |
| 77 | 28 | "History Of Tall Buildings" | February 8, 1999 |
| 78 | 29 | "Engineering Disasters" | February 22, 1999 |

=== Season 5 (1999) ===
| No. overall | No. in season | Title | Original release date |
|---|---|---|---|
| 79 | 1 | "City Parks" | March 9, 1999 |
| 80 | 2 | "Spy Technology" | March 15, 1999 |
| 81 | 3 | "Battlefield Medicine" | March 30, 1999 |
| 82 | 4 | "Map Making" | April 8, 1999 |
| 83 | 5 | "Rescue Equipment" | May 1, 1999 |
| 84 | 6 | "Jet Engines" | May 3, 1999 |
| 85 | 7 | "Garbage" | May 10, 1999 |
| 86 | 8 | "Harley-Davidson" | May 11, 1999 |
| 87 | 9 | "Bombs" | May 13, 1999 |
| 88 | 10 | "Salt Mines" | May 19, 1999 |
| 89 | 11 | "Scuba and Deep Sea Diving" | May 24, 1999 |
| 90 | 12 | "Submarines" | May 25, 1999 |
| 91 | 13 | "Dynamite" | June 21, 1999 |
| 92 | 14 | "Offshore Oil Drilling" | July 6, 1999 |
| 93 | 15 | "Hoover Dam" | July 12, 1999 |
| 94 | 16 | "Baseball Parks" | July 19, 1999 |
| 95 | 17 | "New York Bridges" | August 2, 1999 |
| 96 | 18 | "Crash Testing" | August 9, 1999 |
| 97 | 19 | TBA | TBA |
| 98 | 20 | "Parachutes" | August 23, 1999 |
| 99 | 21 | TBA | TBA |
| 100 | 22 | "Fireworks" | September 6, 1999 |
| 101 | 23 | "The Atlantic Wall" | September 13, 1999 |
| 102 | 24 | TBA | TBA |
| 103 | 25 | "The Tool Bench: Power Tools" | October 11, 1999 |
| 104 | 26 | TBA | TBA |
| 105 | 27 | "Forts" | October 18, 1999 |
| 106 | 28 | "Emergency Room" | October 25, 1999 |
| 107 | 29 | "Motorcycles" | November 15, 1999 |
| 108 | 30 | TBA | TBA |
| 109 | 31 | "The Tool Bench: Hand Tools" | November 23, 1999 |
| 110 | 32 | "More Engineering Disasters" | November 29, 1999 |
| 111 | 33 | TBA | TBA |
| 112 | 34 | "Casino Tech" | December 13, 1999 |

=== Season 6 (2000) ===
| No. overall | No. in season | Title | Original release date |
|---|---|---|---|
| 113 | 1 | TBA | TBA |
| 114 | 2 | TBA | TBA |
| 115 | 3 | TBA | TBA |
| 116 | 4 | "Space Stations" | February 3, 2000 |
| 117 | 5 | TBA | TBA |
| 118 | 6 | TBA | TBA |
| 119 | 7 | "Bridges" | February 29, 2000 |
| 120 | 8 | "Prisons" | March 6, 2000 |
| 121 | 9 | "Gadgets" | March 13, 2000 |
| 122 | 10 | "Office Wonders" | March 15, 2000 |
| 123 | 11 | "Great Inventions" | March 16, 2000 |
| 124 | 12 | "War Planes of World War II" | April 10, 2000 |
| 125 | 13 | "Police Technology" | April 17, 2000 |
| 126 | 14 | "Disaster Technology" | May 8, 2000 |
| 127 | 15 | "Tower Bridge" | May 25, 2000 |
| 128 | 16 | "Concrete" | May 31, 2000 |
| 129 | 17 | "Camping Technology" | June 6, 2000 |
| 130 | 18 | "Private Planes" | June 12, 2000 |
| 131 | 19 | "Race Cars" | June 19, 2000 |
| 132 | 20 | TBA | TBA |
| 133 | 21 | "Traffic" | June 22, 2000 |
| 134 | 22 | TBA | TBA |
| 135 | 23 | "Buses" | July 27, 2000 |
| 136 | 24 | "Gold Mines" | July 31, 2000 |
| 137 | 25 | "Banks" | August 2, 2000 |
| 138 | 26 | "The Erie Canal" | August 14, 2000 |
| 139 | 27 | "Trucks" | August 22, 2000 |
| 140 | 28 | "Then and Now: Aswan Dam" | September 11, 2000 |
| 141 | 29 | "China's Great Dam" | September 13, 2000 |
| 142 | 30 | "The Maginot Line" | September 18, 2000 |
| 143 | 31 | "Physical Fitness: Quest For Muscle" | September 26, 2000 |
| 144 | 32 | "Video Games: Behind the Fun" | October 9, 2000 |
| 145 | 33 | "The Body Shop" | October 16, 2000 |
| 146 | 34 | "Machine Tools" | October 17, 2000 |
| 147 | 35 | "Farming Technology" | October 18, 2000 |
| 148 | 36 (Note: Duplicate episode number listed.) | "Suez Canal" | October 25, 2000 |
| 149 | 36 | "Assembly Line" | October 19, 2000 |
| 150 | 37 | "The London Underground" | November 2, 2000 |
| 151 | 38 | "Combat Training" | November 6, 2000 |
| 152 | 39 | "Remote Operated Vehicles" | November 8, 2000 |
| 153 | 40 | "Death Devices" | November 13, 2000 |
| 154 | 41 | TBA | TBA |
| 155 | 42 | TBA | TBA |
| 156 | 43 | "Power Plants." | June 16, 2001 |
| 157 | 44 | "Inventions of War" | December 12, 2000 |
| 158 | 45 | TBA | TBA |
| 159 | 46 | "Engineering Disasters" | December 18, 2000 |

=== Season 7 (2001) ===
| No. overall | No. in season | Title | Original release date |
|---|---|---|---|
| 160 | 1 | "Home Tech" | January 3, 2001 |
| 161 | 2 | "Proving Grounds" | January 8, 2001 |
| 162 | 3 | TBA | TBA |
| 163 | 4 | TBA | TBA |
| 164 | 5 | TBA | TBA |
| 165 | 6 | "Apollo 13" | January 22, 2001 |
| 166 | 7 | TBA | TBA |
| 167 | 8 | "Survival Technology" | January 29, 2001 |
| 168 | 9 | TBA | TBA |
| 169 | 10 | "Chesapeake Bay Bridge & Tunnel" | February 7, 2001 |
| 170 | 11 | TBA | TBA |
| 171 | 12 | "Garage Gadgets" | February 12, 2001 |
| 172 | 13 | "Monster Trucks" | March 12, 2001 |
| 173 | 14 | "Then And Now: Airships" | March 17, 2001 |
| 174 | 15 | "Lighthouses" | March 19, 2001 |
| 175 | 16 | TBA | TBA |
| 176 | 17 | "The Pentagon" | March 27, 2001 |
| 177 | 18 | "How Did They Build That?: Concrete" | April 11, 2001 |
| 178 | 19 | "Computers" | April 11, 2001 |
| 179 | 20 | "Engineering Disasters 3" | April 16, 2001 |
| 180 | 21 | TBA | TBA |
| 181 | 22 | TBA | TBA |
| 182 | 23 | TBA | TBA |
| 183 | 24 | TBA | TBA |
| 184 | 25 | "International Airports II" | May 14, 2001 |
| 185 | 26 | "Codes" | May 21, 2001 |
| 186 | 27 | TBA | TBA |
| 187 | 28 | "Tunnels of Vietnam" | November 13, 2002 |
| 188 | 29 | TBA | TBA |
| 189 | 30 | TBA | TBA |
| 190 | 31 | TBA | TBA |
| 191 | 32 | "The Colosseum" | June 11, 2001 |
| 192 | 33 | "Battle Gear" | June 19, 2001 |
| 193 | 34 | "Then And Now: Hadrian's Wall" | June 23, 2001 |
| 194 | 35 | "Hardware Stores" | June 25, 2001 |
| 195 | 36 | "More Gadgets" | June 27, 2001 |
| 196 | 37 | "Cattle Ranches" | July 24, 2001 |
| 197 | 38 | "Saloons" | July 25, 2001 |
| 198 | 39 | TBA | TBA |
| 199 | 40 | TBA | TBA |
| 200 | 41 | TBA | TBA |
| 201 | 42 | "The Spitfire" | August 16, 2001 |
| 202 | 43 | "Construction Machines" | August 17, 2001 |
| 203 | 44 | "Cannons" | August 21, 2001 |
| 204 | 45 | "Nuclear Subs" | August 28, 2001 |
| 205 | 46 | TBA | TBA |
| 206 | 47 | "Air Shows" | September 4, 2001 |
| 207 | 48 | "West Point" | September 11, 2001 |
| 208 | 49 | TBA | TBA |
| 209 | 50 | "Quarries" | September 18, 2001 |
| 210 | 51 | "Diamond Mines" | September 19, 2001 |
| 211 | 52 | "Secret Life Of The Crash Test Dummy" | September 25, 2001 |
| 212 | 53 | "The Mig" | September 27, 2001 |
| 213 | 54 | "The House" | October 15, 2001 |
| 214 | 55 | "Work Clothes" | October 17, 2001 |
| 215 | 56 | "Bunkers" | October 23, 2001 |
| 216 | 57 | TBA | TBA |
| 217 | 58 | "Cemeteries" | October 31, 2001 |
| 218 | 59 | TBA | TBA |
| 219 | 60 | "War Games" | November 13, 2001 |
| 220 | 61 | TBA | TBA |
| 221 | 62 | TBA | TBA |
| 222 | 63 | TBA | TBA |
| 223 | 64 | "Times Square" | November 29, 2001 |
| 224 | 65 | "Glass" | December 1, 2001 |
| 225 | 66 | "Firing Ranges" | December 4, 2001 |
| 226 | 67 | "St. Louis Arch" | December 11, 2001 |

=== Season 8 (2002) ===
| No. overall | No. in season | Title | Original release date |
|---|---|---|---|
| 227 | 1 | "Failed Inventions" | January 2, 2002 |
| 228 | 2 | "James Bond Gadgets" | TBA |
| 229 | 3 | "Private Jets: Part 1" | January 28, 2002 |
| 230 | 4 | "Private Jets Part 2" | January 28, 2002 |
| 231 | 5 | "Remote Control" | January 30, 2002 |
| 232 | 6 | "Million Dollar Tech" | January 31, 2002 |
| 233 | 7 | "Pleasure Boats" | February 1, 2002 |
| 234 | 8 | "Bulletproof" | February 19, 2002 |
| 235 | 9 | "Siege Machines" | February 26, 2002 |
| 236 | 10 | "The Junkyard" | March 5, 2002 |
| 237 | 11 | TBA | TBA |
| 238 | 12 | "The F-14" | March 12, 2002 |
| 239 | 13 | TBA | TBA |
| 240 | 14 (Note: Duplicate episode number listed.) | "The Wheel" | March 26, 2002 |
| 241 | 14 | "Engines" | March 19, 2002 |
| 242 | 15 | "Then and Now: Star City" | April 9, 2002 |
| 243 | 16 | "Ice Breakers" | April 16, 2002 |
| 244 | 17 | TBA | TBA |
| 245 | 18 | "Fire and Ice" | April 18, 2002 |
| 246 | 19 | "Muscle Cars" | April 30, 2002 |
| 247 | 20 | "Axes, Swords and Knives." | May 7, 2002 |
| 248 | 21 | TBA | TBA |
| 249 | 22 | TBA | TBA |
| 250 | 23 | "Drag Racing" | May 21, 2002 |
| 251 | 24 | TBA | TBA |
| 252 | 25 | "The Manhattan Project" | June 4, 2002 |
| 253 | 26 | TBA | TBA |
| 254 | 27 | "Hunting Gear" | June 12, 2002 |
| 255 | 28 | TBA | TBA |
| 256 | 29 | TBA | TBA |
| 257 | 30 | TBA | TBA |
| 258 | 31 | TBA | TBA |
| 259 | 32 | "Physical Fitness - Quest for Health" | June 27, 2002 |
| 260 | 33 | "Beach Technology" | July 2, 2002 |
| 261 | 34 | "Strategic Air Command" | July 16, 2002 |
| 262 | 35 | "Gasoline" | July 23, 2002 |
| 263 | 36 | TBA | TBA |
| 264 | 37 | "World's Biggest Machines" | August 7, 2002 |
| 265 | 38 | TBA | TBA |
| 266 | 39 | "The Chrysler Building" | September 10, 2002 |
| 267 | 40 | TBA | TBA |
| 268 | 41 | TBA | TBA |
| 269 | 42 | TBA | TBA |
| 270 | 43 | "High Tech Sex" | October 30, 2002 |
| 271 | 44 | "More Bond Gadgets" | December 2, 2002 |
| 272 | 45 | "Motorcycles" | December 3, 2002 |
| 273 | 46 | "Limousines" | December 4, 2002 |
| 274 | 47 | "Convertibles" | December 4, 2002 |
| 275 | 48 | "Digi-Tech" | December 5, 2002 |
| 276 | 49 | "Concept Cars" | December 10, 2002 |
| 277 | 50 | "Runways" | December 17, 2002 |

=== Season 9 (2003) ===
| No. overall | No. in season | Title | Original release date |
|---|---|---|---|
| 274 | 1 | "Castles and Dungeons" | January 7, 2003 |
| 275 | 2 | "The Trans-Siberian Railroad" | January 28, 2003 |
| 276 | 3 | "Booby Traps" | February 4, 2003 |
| 277 | 4 | "The Alcan Highway" | February 11, 2003 |
| 278 | 5 | TBA | TBA |
| 279 | 6 | TBA | TBA |
| 280 | 7 | "Mackinac Bridge" | March 5, 2003 |
| 281 | 8 | "Bullet Trains" | March 11, 2003 |
| 282 | 9 | "Army Corps Of Engineers" | March 18, 2003 |
| 283 | 10 | TBA | TBA |
| 284 | 11 | TBA | TBA |
| 285 | 12 | TBA | TBA |
| 286 | 13 | TBA | TBA |
| 287 | 14 | TBA | TBA |
| 288 | 15 | "Torture Devices" | May 22, 2003 |
| 289 | 16 | TBA | TBA |
| 290 | 17 | "The Exterminator" | June 3, 2003 |
| 291 | 18 | "Dangerous Cargo" | June 25, 2003 |
| 292 | 19 | "Engineering Disasters 4" | July 2, 2003 |
| 293 | 20 | "Logging Tech" | July 9, 2003 |
| 294 | 21 | "Breaking The Sound Barrier" | July 16, 2003 |
| 295 | 22 | TBA | TBA |
| 296 | 23 | "Car Crashes" | July 23, 2003 |
| 297 | 24 | "Terror Tech: Civilian" | July 29, 2003 |
| 298 | 25 | "Loading Docks" | July 30, 2003 |
| 299 | 26 | TBA | TBA |
| 300 | 27 | "Military Movers" | August 6, 2003 |
| 301 | 28 | "Terror Tech: Defending The Highrise" | August 12, 2003 |
| 302 | 29 | "Bullets" | August 13, 2003 |
| 303 | 30 | TBA | TBA |
| 304 | 31 | "Metal" | August 19, 2003 |
| 305 | 32 | TBA | TBA |
| 306 | 33 | "Space Shuttle Columbia" | August 26, 2003 |
| 307 | 34 | "Overseas Highway" | September 3, 2003 |
| 308 | 35 | "Machu Picchu" | September 24, 2003 |
| 309 | 36 | "Smart Bombs" | September 30, 2003 |
| 310 | 37 | "Lake Pontchartrain Causeway" | October 15, 2003 |
| 311 | 38 | TBA | TBA |
| 312 | 39 | TBA | TBA |
| 313 | 40 | TBA | TBA |
| 314 | 41 | TBA | TBA |
| 315 | 42 | TBA | TBA |
| 316 | 43 | TBA | TBA |
| 317 | 44 | "Shipyards" | November 5, 2003 |
| 318 | 45 | TBA | TBA |
| 319 | 46 | "Extreme Trucks" | November 12, 2003 |
| 320 | 47 | TBA | TBA |
| 321 | 48 | TBA | TBA |
| 322 | 49 | TBA | TBA |
| 323 | 50 | TBA | TBA |
| 324 | 51 | TBA | TBA |
| 325 | 52 | "Boys' Toys: Extreme Gadgets" | December 2, 2003 |
| 326 | 53 | TBA | TBA |
| 327 | 54 | TBA | TBA |
| 328 | 55 | "Failed Inventions" | December 10, 2003 |
| 329 | 56 | TBA | TBA |
| 330 | 57 | "Egyptian Pyramids" | December 18, 2003 |
| 331 | 58 | "The Berlin Wall" | December 19, 2003 |
| 332 | 59 | "Toys" | December 23, 2003 |

=== Season 10 (2004) ===
| No. overall | No. in season | Title | Original release date |
|---|---|---|---|
| 333 | 1 | "Pacific Coast Highway" | February 4, 2004 |
| 334 | 2 | TBA | TBA |
| 335 | 3 | "Racetrack Tech" | February 18, 2004 |
| 336 | 4 | "Guns of the Civil War" | October 15, 2004 |
| 337 | 5 | TBA | TBA |
| 338 | 6 | "Oil Fire Fighting" | March 3, 2004 |
| 339 | 7 | "Command Central" | March 17, 2004 |
| 340 | 8 | TBA | TBA |
| 341 | 9 | TBA | TBA |
| 342 | 10 | TBA | TBA |
| 343 | 11 | "Nature's Engineers" | May 31, 2004 |
| 344 | 12 | "Bible Tech" | April 7, 2004 |
| 345 | 13 | TBA | TBA |
| 346 | 14 | "Bathroom Tech" | April 21, 2004 |
| 347 | 15 | "Engineering Disasters 6" | April 28, 2004 |
| 348 | 16 | TBA | TBA |
| 349 | 17 | "Hydraulics" | May 12, 2004 |
| 350 | 18 | TBA | TBA |
| 351 | 19 | TBA | TBA |
| 352 | 20 | "Plane Crashes" | May 26, 2004 |
| 353 | 21 | "D-Day Tech" | June 3, 2004 |
| 354 | 22 | "Rubber" | June 9, 2004 |
| 355 | 23 | "City Water" | June 15, 2004 |
| 356 | 24 | TBA | TBA |
| 357 | 25 | "Nuclear Tech" | July 8, 2004 |
| 358 | 26 | "Apollo 11" | July 21, 2004 |
| 359 | 27 | TBA | TBA |
| 360 | 28 | "World War I Tech" | July 30, 2004 |
| 361 | 29 | "Distilleries" | July 14, 2004 (Note: Out-of-order air-date listed.) |
| 362 | 30 | "Oil Tankers" | August 11, 2004 |
| 363 | 31 | "Athens' Subway" | August 18, 2004 |
| 364 | 32 | "Extreme Aircraft" | August 25, 2004 |
| 365 | 33 | "Engineering Disasters 7" | August 31, 2004 |
| 366 | 34 | "Building a Skyscraper: The Skeleton" | September 7, 2004 |
| 367 | 35 | TBA | TBA |
| 368 | 36 | "St. Lawrence Seaway" | September 15, 2004 |
| 369 | 37 | "Police Pursuit" | September 22, 2004 |
| 370 | 38 | TBA | TBA |
| 371 | 39 | "Engineering Disasters 8" | October 5, 2004 |
| 372 | 40 | "Harvesting" | October 6, 2004 |
| 373 | 41 | "Building a Skyscraper - The Exterior" | October 10, 2004 |
| 374 | 42 | "Building a Skyscraper - The Human Environment" | October 10, 2004 |
| 375 | 43 | "Building A Skyscraper: The Arteries" | October 10, 2004 |
| 376 | 44 | "Engineering Disasters 9" | October 12, 2004 |
| 377 | 45 | TBA | TBA |
| 378 | 46 | "Engineering Disasters 10" | October 19, 2004 |
| 379 | 47 | "Presidential Movers" | October 20, 2004 |
| 380 | 48 | "Gas Tech" | October 20, 2004 |
| 381 | 49 | "Engineering Disasters 11" | October 26, 2004 |
| 382 | 50 | TBA | TBA |
| 383 | 51 | TBA | TBA |
| 384 | 52 | "Engineering Disasters 12" | November 9, 2004 |
| 385 | 53 | TBA | TBA |
| 386 | 54 | "Engineering Disasters 13" | November 16, 2004 |
| 387 | 55 | "More of the World's Biggest Machines" | November 17, 2004 |
| 388 | 56 | "Sub Disasters" | November 17, 2004 |
| 389 | 57 | "Engineering Disasters 14" | November 23, 2004 |
| 390 | 58 | TBA | TBA |
| 391 | 59 | "Washington Monument" | December 1, 2004 |
| 392 | 60 | "Engineering Disasters 15" | December 8, 2004 |
| 393 | 61 | "Snackfood Tech" | December 16, 2004 |
| 394 | 62 | "More Dangerous Cargo" | December 21, 2004 |
| 395 | 63 | TBA | TBA |
| 396 | 64 | TBA | TBA |
| 397 | 65 | "Commercial Fishing" | December 21, 2004 |
| 398 | 66 | TBA | TBA |
| 399 | 67 | "Engineering Disasters 16" | December 23, 2004 |
| 400 | 68 | "Doomsday Tech" | December 28, 2004 |
| 401 | 69 | "More Doomsday Tech" | December 28, 2004 |

=== Season 11 (2005) ===
| No. overall | No. in season | Title | Original release date |
|---|---|---|---|
| 402 | 1 | TBA | TBA |
| 403 | 2 | "The Arch" | January 12, 2005 |
| 404 | 3 | "Nature's Engineers 2" | January 18, 2005 |
| 405 | 4 | "World's Biggest Machines 3" | January 26, 2005 |
| 406 | 5 | TBA | TBA |
| 407 | 6 | "The Butcher" | February 8, 2005 |
| 408 | 7 | "George Washington Carver Tech" | February 15, 2005 |
| 409 | 8 | "Sub Zero" | February 23, 2005 |
| 410 | 9 | "Desert Tech" | February 23, 2005 |
| 411 | 10 | TBA | TBA |
| 412 | 11 | TBA | TBA |
| 413 | 12 | TBA | TBA |
| 414 | 13 | TBA | TBA |
| 415 | 14 | "Deadliest Weapons" | March 16, 2005 |
| 416 | 15 | "Edwards Air Force Base" | March 18, 2005 |
| 417 | 16 | TBA | TBA |
| 418 | 17 | "The Basement" | April 26, 2005 |
| 419 | 18 | TBA | TBA |
| 420 | 19 | "Paint" | April 27, 2005 |
| 421 | 20 | "Bricks" | May 11, 2005 |
| 422 | 21 | "Heavy Metal: PT Boat" | December 17, 2004 (Note: Out-of-order air-date listed.) |
| 423 | 22 | "Glue" | May 18, 2005 |
| 424 | 23 | TBA | TBA |
| 425 | 24 | "Civil War Tech" | May 25, 2005 |
| 426 | 25 | "Machines of D-Day" | June 3, 2005 |
| 427 | 26 | "John Hancock Center" | June 8, 2005 |
| 428 | 27 | "The Cape Cod Canal" | June 15, 2005 |
| 429 | 28 | TBA | TBA |
| 430 | 29 | TBA | TBA |
| 431 | 30 | TBA | TBA |
| 432 | 31 | "Edison Tech" | June 28, 2005 |
| 433 | 32 | TBA | TBA |
| 434 | 33 | "Cowboy Tech" | July 20, 2005 |
| 435 | 34 | TBA | TBA |
| 436 | 35 | TBA | TBA |
| 437 | 36 | "World's Biggest Machines 4" | August 2, 2005 |
| 438 | 37 | "Dredging" | August 3, 2005 |
| 439 | 38 | TBA | TBA |
| 440 | 39 | TBA | TBA |
| 441 | 40 | TBA | TBA |
| 442 | 41 | "The World's Fastest" | August 24, 2005 |
| 443 | 42 | TBA | TBA |
| 444 | 43 | TBA | TBA |
| 445 | 44 | "Wiring America" | August 31, 2005 |
| 446 | 45 | "HMS Victory" | May 26, 2007 |
| 447 | 46 | "Coffee" | September 14, 2005 |
| 448 | 47 | "Sugar" | September 14, 2005 |
| 449 | 48 | TBA | TBA |
| 450 | 49 | TBA | TBA |
| 451 | 50 | TBA | TBA |
| 452 | 51 | "Mountain Roads" | October 28, 2005 |
| 453 | 52 | "Engineering Disasters 17" | November 2, 2005 |
| 454 | 53 | TBA | TBA |
| 455 | 54 | "Brewing" | November 16, 2005 |
| 456 | 55 | "The Lumberyard" | November 30, 2005 |
| 457 | 56 | "Da Vinci Tech" | December 4, 2005 |
| 458 | 57 | "More Hardware" | December 6, 2005 |
| 459 | 58 | "More Snackfood Tech" | December 20, 2005 |
| 460 | 59 | "Walt Disney World" | December 25, 2005 |
| 461 | 60 | "Nature Tech: Hurricanes" | December 30, 2005 |

=== Season 12 (2006) ===
| No. overall | No. in season | Title | Original release date |
|---|---|---|---|
| 462 | 1 | "Containers" | January 4, 2006 |
| 463 | 2 | "Fire" | January 11, 2006 |
| 464 | 3 | "Cotton" | January 18, 2006 |
| 465 | 4 | TBA | TBA |
| 466 | 5 | TBA | TBA |
| 467 | 6 | "Engineering Disasters 18" | February 8, 2006 |
| 468 | 7 | "Candy" | February 14, 2006 |
| 469 | 8 | TBA | TBA |
| 470 | 9 | "Engineering Disasters: New Orleans" | February 28, 2006 |
| 471 | 10 | "Leather" | March 8, 2006 |
| 472 | 11 | "Engineering Disasters 19" | March 22, 2006 |
| 473 | 12 | "Insulation" | April 26, 2006 |
| 474 | 13 | "Shovels" | May 3, 2006 |
| 475 | 14 | "Drilling" | May 10, 2006 |
| 476 | 15 | "80's Tech" | May 24, 2006 |
| 477 | 16 | "Ben Franklin Tech" | May 25, 2006 |
| 478 | 17 | TBA | TBA |
| 479 | 18 | "Heavy Metals" | June 14, 2006 |
| 480 | 19 | "Horsepower" | June 21, 2006 |
| 481 | 20 | "BBQ Tech" | June 28, 2006 |
| 482 | 21 | TBA | TBA |
| 483 | 22 | "Pirate Tech" | July 9, 2006 |
| 484 | 23 | "World's Biggest Machines 5" | July 26, 2006 |
| 485 | 24 | TBA | TBA |
| 486 | 25 | "Nuts" | August 2, 2006 |
| 487 | 26 | TBA | TBA |
| 488 | 27 | TBA | TBA |
| 489 | 28 | TBA | TBA |
| 490 | 29 | "Mummy Tech" | August 23, 2006 |
| 491 | 30 | "Levees" | August 30, 2006 |
| 492 | 31 | "Water" | September 6, 2006 |
| 493 | 32 | "Copper" | September 13, 2006 |
| 494 | 33 | "Shotguns" | September 17, 2006 |
| 495 | 34 | TBA | TBA |
| 496 | 35 | "Renewable Energy" | September 20, 2006 |
| 497 | 36 | "Freight Trains" | September 20, 2006 |
| 498 | 37 | TBA | TBA |
| 499 | 38 | "Assembly Lines" | September 23, 2006 |
| 500 | 39 | TBA | TBA |
| 501 | 40 | TBA | TBA |
| 502 | 41 | "Ink" | October 4, 2006 |
| 503 | 42 | "Distilleries 2" | October 11, 2006 |
| 504 | 43 | "World's Strongest" | October 18, 2006 |
| 505 | 44 | "Tomcat Sunset" | November 1, 2006 |
| 506 | 45 | "Tobacco" | November 8, 2006 |
| 507 | 46 | TBA | TBA |
| 508 | 47 | "The Supermarket" | November 15, 2006 |
| 509 | 48 | "Breakfast Tech" | November 28, 2006 |
| 510 | 49 | "Wine" | November 29, 2006 |
| 511 | 50 | "Harvesting 2" | November 29, 2006 |
| 512 | 51 | "Engineering Disasters 20" | December 6, 2006 |
| 513 | 52 | "Snow" | December 10, 2006 |
| 514 | 53 | "Tea" | December 13, 2006 |
| 515 | 54 | "Christmas Tech" | December 20, 2006 |

=== Season 13 (2007) ===
| No. overall | No. in season | Title | Original release date |
|---|---|---|---|
| 516 | 1 | "Balls" | January 17, 2007 |
| 517 | 2 | "Environmental Tech" | January 24, 2007 |
| 518 | 3 | "Canning" | January 31, 2007 |
| 519 | 4 | "Pumps" | February 7, 2007 |
| 520 | 5 | "Ice" | February 11, 2007 |
| 521 | 6 | TBA | TBA |
| 522 | 7 | TBA | TBA |
| 523 | 8 | "Weapons of Mass Destruction" | February 21, 2007 |
| 524 | 9 | "Barbarian Battle Tech" | March 4, 2007 |
| 525 | 10 | TBA | TBA |
| 526 | 11 | "Dams" | March 28, 2007 |
| 527 | 12 | TBA | TBA |
| 528 | 13 | "Yard Tech" | April 12, 2007 |
| 529 | 14 | "More Military Movers" | April 18, 2007 |
| 530 | 15 | "Deep Sea Salvage" | May 2, 2007 |
| 531 | 16 | "Welding" | May 9, 2007 |
| 532 | 17 | "It Came from Outer Space" | May 16, 2007 |
| 533 | 18 | "60's Tech" | May 16, 2007 |
| 534 | 19 | "World's Strongest 2" | May 23, 2007 |
| 535 | 20 | "Engineering Disasters of the 70's" | May 31, 2007 |
| 536 | 21 | "70's Tech" | May 30, 2007 (Note: Out-of-order air-date listed.) |
| 537 | 22 | "Truck Stops" | June 13, 2007 |
| 538 | 23 | "Fertilizer" | June 20, 2007 |
| 539 | 24 | "Cheese" | June 27, 2007 |
| 540 | 25 | "Saws" | July 18, 2007 |
| 541 | 26 | "Aluminum" | July 25, 2007 |
| 542 | 27 | "Sticky Stuff" | July 30, 2007 |
| 543 | 28 | "Chocolate" | August 6, 2007 |
| 544 | 29 | "Bedroom Tech" | August 13, 2007 |
| 545 | 30 | "Vacuums" | August 23, 2007 |
| 546 | 31 | "Traps" | August 27, 2007 |
| 547 | 32 | "Batteries" | September 19, 2007 |
| 548 | 33 | "Extreme Aircraft II" | September 20, 2007 |
| 549 | 34 | "Deep Freeze" | September 25, 2007 |
| 550 | 35 | "Acid" | October 1, 2007 |
| 551 | 36 | "World's Sharpest" | October 11, 2007 |
| 552 | 37 | "Copper" | TBA |
| 553 | 38 | "Environmental Tech II" | November 12, 2007 |
| 554 | 39 | "Corn" | November 19, 2007 |
| 555 | 40 | "The Pig" | November 27, 2007 |
| 556 | 41 | "Rocks" | December 3, 2007 |
| 557 | 42 | "Most Shocking" | December 10, 2007 |
| 558 | 43 | "Cold Cuts" | TBA |
| 559 | 44 | "Fast Food Tech" | December 26, 2007 |

=== Season 14 (2008) ===
| No. overall | No. in season | Title | Original release date |
|---|---|---|---|
| 560 | 1 | "Milk" | January 7, 2008 |
| 561 | 2 | "Carbon" | January 14, 2008 |
| 562 | 3 | "90's Tech" | February 7, 2008 |
| 563 | 4 | "Superhighways" | February 28, 2008 |
| 564 | 5 | "World's Strongest III" | March 6, 2008 |
| 565 | 6 | "Strange Weapons" | March 10, 2008 |
| 566 | 7 | "Alaskan Fishing" | March 16, 2008 |
| 567 | 8 | "Whiskey" | March 17, 2008 |
| 568 | 9 | "Bread" | March 24, 2008 |
| 569 | 10 | "Gadgets 3" | April 4, 2008 |
| 570 | 11 | "Locomotives" | April 7, 2008 |
| 571 | 12 | "Rats" | April 30, 2008 |
| 572 | 13 | "Mad Electricity" | May 14, 2008 |
| 573 | 14 | "Axes" | May 30, 2008 |
| 574 | 15 | "Most Dangerous" | June 6, 2008 |
| 575 | 16 | "Super Hot" | June 9, 2008 |
| 576 | 17 | "Corpse Tech" | June 20, 2008 |
| 577 | 18 | "Ice Cream" | June 23, 2008 |
| 578 | 19 | "Bathroom Tech II" | June 30, 2008 |
| 579 | 20 | "Crashes" | July 10, 2008 |
| 580 | 21 | "Underwear" | July 17, 2008 |
| 581 | 22 | "Coin Operated" | July 24, 2008 |
| 582 | 23 | "Secrets of Oil" | July 31, 2008 |
| 583 | 24 | "Iron" | August 14, 2008 |
| 584 | 25 | "Wheat" | August 21, 2008 |
| 585 | 26 | "Dangerous Roads" | August 28, 2008 |
| 586 | 27 | "Mold & Fungus" | September 18, 2008 |
| 587 | 28 | "Lead" | October 9, 2008 |
| 588 | 29 | "Corrosion & Decomposition" | October 13, 2008 |
| 589 | 30 | "Bulls-Eye" | October 20, 2008 |
| 590 | 31 | "Halloween Tech" | October 27, 2008 |
| 591 | 32 | "The Horse" | November 19, 2008 |
| 592 | 33 | "The Turkey" | November 24, 2008 |
| 593 | 34 | "Salt" | December 1, 2008 |
| 594 | 35 | "Car Wash" | December 8, 2008 |
| 595 | 36 | "Retro Tech" | December 19, 2008 |
| 596 | 37 | "Super Human" | December 22, 2008 |
| 597 | 38 | "Measure It" | December 23, 2008 |

=== Season 15 (2009-10) ===
| No. overall | No. in season | Title | Original release date |
|---|---|---|---|
| 598 | 1 | "More Ice" | October 28, 2009 |
| 599 | 2 | "Dirt" | January 14, 2010 |
| 600 | 3 | "Eggs" | January 21, 2010 |
| 601 | 4 | "The Potato" | January 28, 2010 |
| 602 | 5 | "Tuna" | February 4, 2010 |
| 603 | 6 | "Winter Tech" | February 11, 2010 |
| 604 | 7 | "Chrome" | March 2, 2010 |
| 605 | 8 | "Start to Finish" | March 4, 2010 |
| 606 | 9 | "Beans" | March 11, 2010 |
| 607 | 10 | "Hot & Spicy" | March 18, 2010 |
| 608 | 11 | "Mega Meals" | March 25, 2010 |
| 609 | 12 | "Fry It" | April 1, 2010 |
| 610 | 13 | "Soft Drinks" | April 8, 2010 |
| 611 | 14 | "Deliver It" | April 15, 2010 |
| 612 | 15 | "Helicopters" | January 17, 2002 (Note: Out-of-order air-date listed.) |
| 613 | 16 | "Super Ships" | April 29, 2010 |
| 614 | 17 | "Big & Small" | May 6, 2010 |
| 615 | 18 | "Breaking Point" | May 13, 2010 |
| 616 | 19 | "Keep Out" | May 20, 2010 |
| 617 | 20 | "Super Steam" | May 27, 2010 |
| 618 | 21 | "Doors" | June 3, 2010 |
| 619 | 22 | "The Real National Treasure" | June 10, 2010 |
| 620 | 23 | "Top Ten" | June 17, 2010 |
| 621 | 24 | "Mega Stores" | October 29, 2010 |
| 622 | 25 | "Supersized Food" | November 5, 2010 |
| 623 | 26 | "Coin Operated II" | November 12, 2010 |
| 624 | 27 | "Engineering Disasters 22" | November 19, 2010 |
| 625 | 28 | "Dogs" | November 26, 2010 |
| 626 | 29 | "Built to Last" | December 3, 2010 |
| 627 | 30 | "Secret Underground" | December 10, 2010 |
| 628 | 31 | "Made in the USA" | December 17, 2010 |
| 629 | 32 | "Driver?s Seat" | December 21, 2010 |
| 630 | 33 | "Rice" | December 29, 2010 |

=== Season 16 (2011-12) ===
| No. overall | No. in season | Title | Original release date |
|---|---|---|---|
| 631 | 1 | "Packaging" | January 14, 2011 |
| 632 | 2 | "Grease" | January 21, 2011 |
| 633 | 3 | "Ropes & Chains" | January 28, 2011 |
| 634 | 4 | "American Trucking" | February 4, 2011 |
| 635 | 5 | "Inside Your Walls" | October 3, 2011 |
| 636 | 6 | "Built by Hand" | October 10, 2011 |
| 637 | 7 | "Swamp Tech" | October 24, 2011 |
| 638 | 8 | "Pocket Tools" | November 7, 2011 |
| 639 | 9 | "Food Trucks" | November 14, 2011 |
| 640 | 10 | "Weird Machines" | November 28, 2011 |
| 641 | 11 | "More Candy" | December 5, 2011 |
| 642 | 12 | "Battle Ready" | December 7, 2011 |
| 643 | 13 | "Stink" | January 23, 2012 |
| 644 | 14 | "Waterproof" | December 16, 2011 |
| 645 | 15 | "Wood" | December 19, 2011 |
| 646 | 16 | "Convenience Stores" | December 26, 2011 |
| 647 | 17 | "Tiny Weapons" | January 16, 2012 |
| 648 | 18 | "Under Pressure" | January 30, 2012 |
| 649 | 19 | "Shoes" | February 6, 2012 |
| 650 | 20 | "Alaska Tech" | February 27, 2012 |
| 651 | 21 | "Engines" | March 13, 2012 |
| 652 | 22 | "Panama Canal Supersized" | April 11, 2015 (Note: Out-of-order air-date listed.) |

=== Season 17 (2012–14) ===
| No. overall | No. in season | Title | Original release date |
|---|---|---|---|
| 653 | 1 | "Mega Speed Countdown" | July 16, 2012 |
| 654 | 2 | "Mega Machine Countdown" | July 23, 2012 |
| 655 | 3 | "Mega Weapon Countdown" | July 30, 2012 |
| 656 | 4 | "Mega Food Countdown" | August 27, 2012 |
| 657 | 5 | "Mega Snack Countdown" | September 7, 2013 |
| 658 | 6 | "Super Strong Countdown" | September 14, 2013 |
| 659 | 7 | "Amazing Job Countdown" | September 21, 2013 |
| 660 | 8 | "Strangest Countdown" | September 28, 2013 |
| 661 | 9 | "Amazing Gadgets Countdown" | June 15, 2014 |
| 662 | 10 | "Hottest Rides Countdown" | June 15, 2014 |

=== Season 18 (2021) ===
| No. overall | No. in season | Title | Original release date |
|---|---|---|---|
| 663 | 1 | "Food: Cookies" | February 21, 2021 |
| 664 | 2 | "Food: Cheese" | February 28, 2021 |
| 665 | 3 | "Food: Ice Cream" | March 7, 2021 |
| 666 | 4 | "Food: Chocolate" | March 14, 2021 |
| 667 | 5 | "Food: Snacks" | March 21, 2021 |
| 668 | 6 | "The Future of Food" | March 28, 2021 |
| 669 | 7 | "Fast Food" | April 4, 2021 |
| 670 | 8 | "Food: Inventions and Innovations" | April 11, 2021 |

=== Season 19 (2021) ===
| No. overall | No. in season | Title | Original release date |
|---|---|---|---|
| 671 | 1 | "Adventure Machines" | July 25, 2021 |
| 672 | 2 | "Heavy Machinery" | August 1, 2021 |
| 673 | 3 | "Moving America" | August 8, 2021 |
| 674 | 4 | "Power Tools" | August 15, 2021 |

=== Season 20 (2021) ===
| No. overall | No. in season | Title | Original release date |
|---|---|---|---|
| 675 | 1 | "Classic Toys" | November 28, 2021 |
| 676 | 2 | "Top Toys & Games" | December 5, 2021 |

=== Season 21 (2022) ===
| No. overall | No. in season | Title | Original release date |
|---|---|---|---|
| 677 | 1 | "Wild Rides" | February 16, 2022 |
| 678 | 2 | "Steam Power" | February 16, 2022 |
| 679 | 3 | "Ultimate Helicopters" | February 23, 2022 |
| 680 | 4 | "Maximum Horsepower" | February 23, 2022 |
| 681 | 5 | "Dangerous Drives" | July 11, 2022 |
| 682 | 6 | "Car Wash Tech" | July 11, 2022 |
| 683 | 7 | "Freight Trains Plus" | July 18, 2022 |
| 684 | 8 | "Locomotives Plus" | July 18, 2022 |
| 685 | 9 | "Harvesting Plus" | July 25, 2022 |
| 686 | 10 | "Mad Electricity Plus" | July 25, 2022 |
| 687 | 11 | "Tech Treasures" | August 1, 2022 |
| 688 | 12 | "Coin Operated Plus" | August 1, 2022 |
| 689 | 13 | "Bathroom Tech Plus" | August 8, 2022 |
| 690 | 14 | "Strange Machines" | August 8, 2022 |
| 691 | 15 | "Yard Tech Plus" | August 8, 2022 |

== External reference links ==
- History.com
- imdb.com
- tv.com
- amazon.com
