= Mackinac Bridge Walk =

Annual event in Michigan US

Coordinates: 45.8221°N 84.7269°W

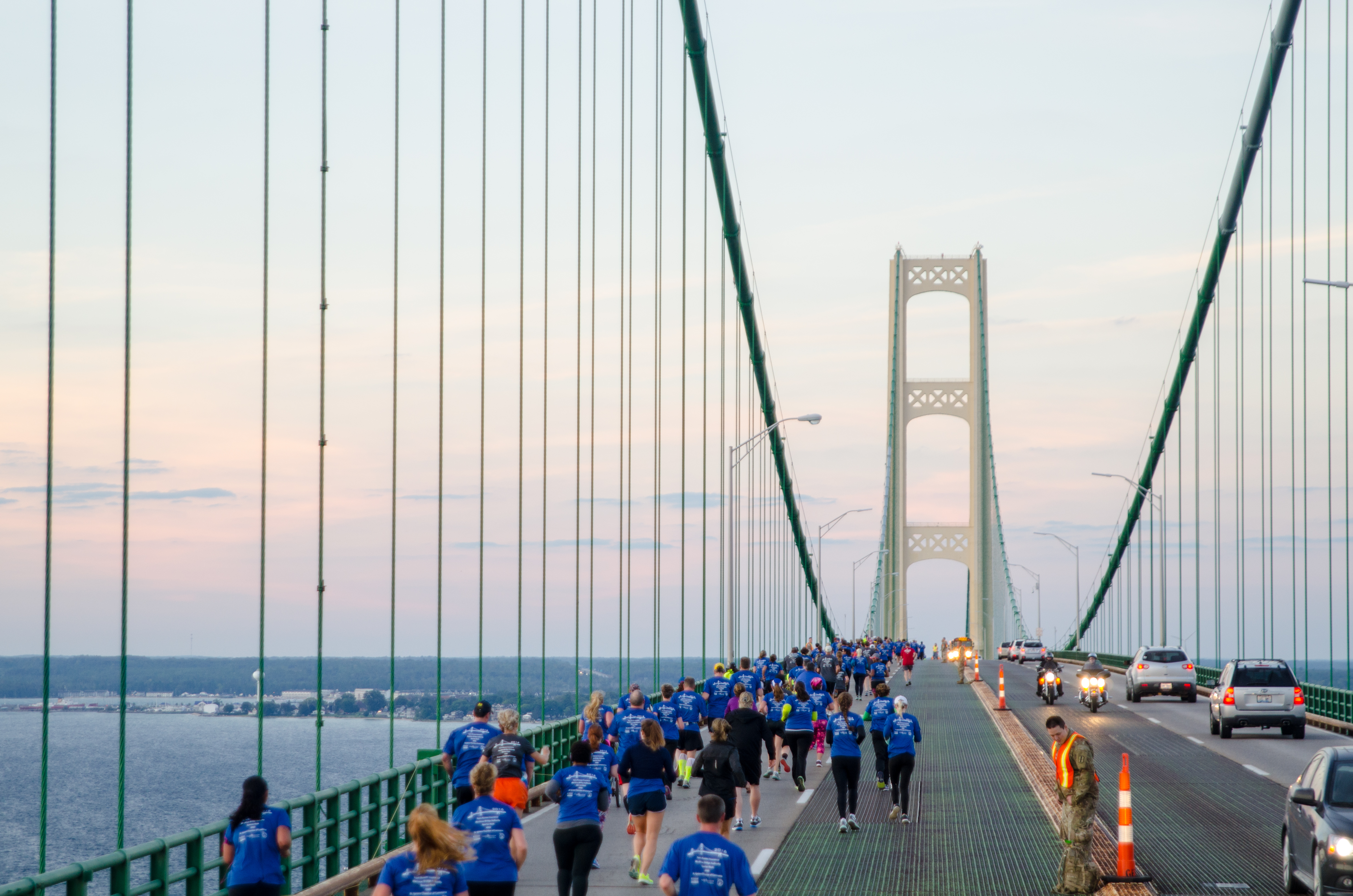
- The 2016 Bridge Walk
- Type: Event
- Date: First Monday in September
- 2025 date: September 1
- 2026 date: September 7
- 2027 date: September 6
- 2028 date: September 4
- Frequency: Annual
- First time: June 1958
- Related to: Labor Day

The Mackinac Bridge Walk is an annual event held every Labor Day since 1958 in Michigan in which people may walk the length of the Mackinac Bridge. Walkers are traditionally led across by the governor of Michigan. In an average year, 40,000 to 65,000 people participate in the five-mile walk. This is nearly the combined population of the two counties connected by the bridge, Mackinac County – Upper Peninsula side and Cheboygan County – Lower Peninsula side.

The Labor Day bridge walk is the sole exception to the rule prohibiting pedestrians on the bridge.

== History ==
The walk was started and took place in late June 1958 during the Bridge's dedication ceremony, led by Governor G. Mennen Williams. That first year only 68 people walked across the bridge. The walk was changed to Labor Day in 1959, and until 1964, participants in the walk alternated north and south in consecutive years.

During the 2007 bridge walk, celebrating the bridge's 50th anniversary, participation was estimated at 60,000 walkers. The record number of walkers is estimated at 85,000 in 1992 when President George H. W. Bush crossed the Mighty Mac.

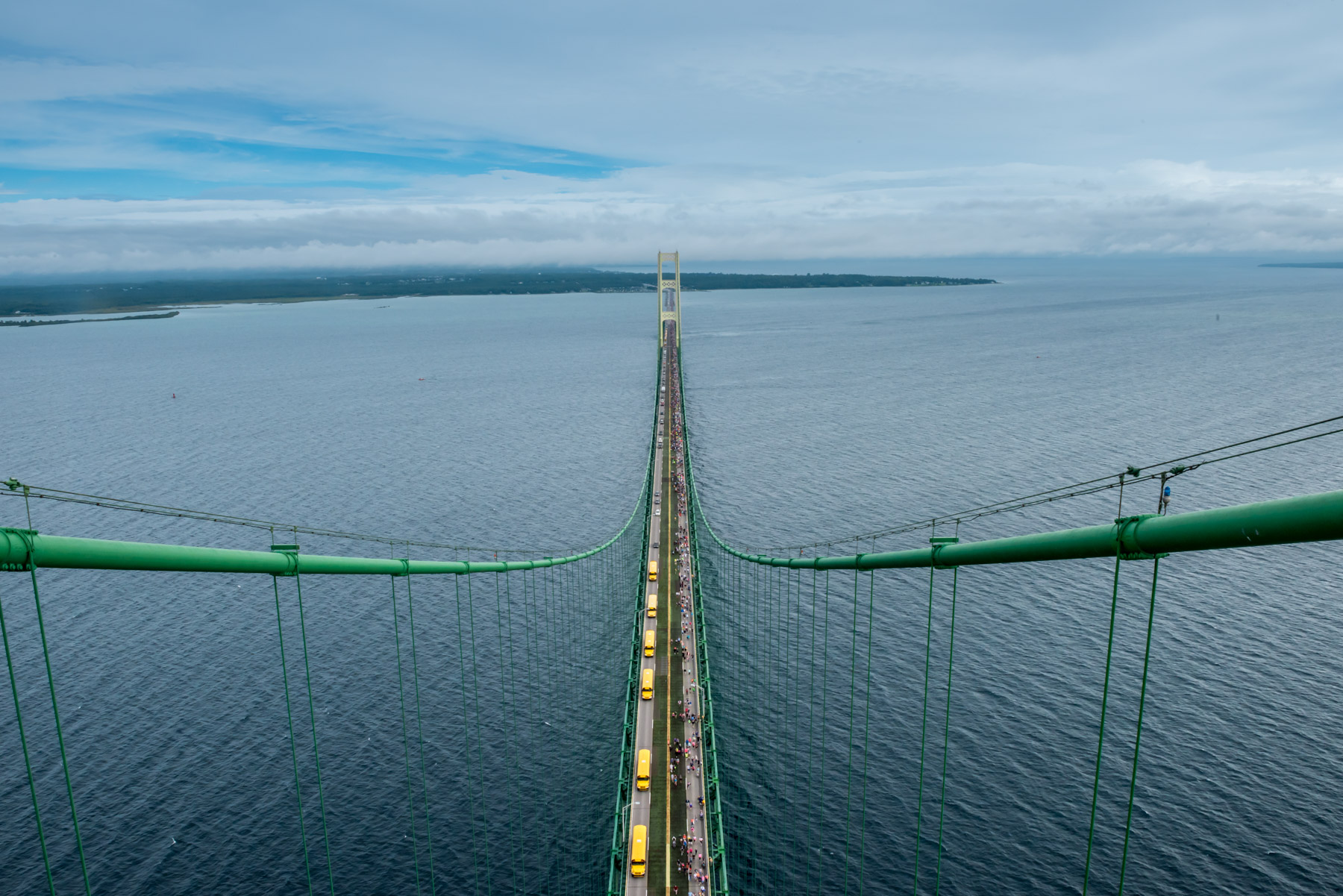
View of the 2015 Bridge Walk from the towers

Starting in 2017, all vehicular traffic on the bridge as well as shipping and boating below, is stopped during the duration of the event. The 2020 edition of the walk was cancelled as a result of the COVID-19 pandemic; the bridge authority cited logistical hurdles and falling toll revenue as reasons for the cancellation.

== See also ==
- Bridge Day
