= Modern Marvels =

1993 American television series

- Created by: Bruce Nash
- Narrated by: Max Raphael; Harlan Saperstein; Will Lyman; Greg Stebner; Bill Ratner; Jack Perkins; David Ackroyd
- Country of origin: United States
- Original language: English
- No. of seasons: 21
- No. of episodes: 691 (list of episodes)

Production
- Executive producer: Don Cambou
- Running time: 44 minutes
- Production company: Jupiter Entertainment

Original release
- Network: A&E (1993-1994); History Channel (1995-2024); H2 (2011-2016)
- Release: December 10, 1993 – September 24, 2024

Modern Marvels, formerly known under A&E as Time Machine, is a television series first aired by the History Channel in 1995, but previously under A&E starting December 10, 1993. It is the History Channel's first and longest-running program, for over 30 years. It focuses on science, history, technology, electronics, mechanics, engineering, architecture, industry, mass production, manufacturing, and agriculture. It also hosted on History2, and currently also hosts on Story Television.

== Production ==
Bruce Nash is credited with creating the series. Don Cambou acted as executive producer on more than 350 episodes for Actuality Productions, the production company behind the series.

Modern Marvels has produced over 650 one-hour episodes topics that include science, technology, electronics, mechanics, engineering, architecture, industry, mass production, manufacturing, and agriculture. Each episode typically discusses the history and production of several related items. For instance, an episode on distilled spirits discusses the production of bourbon in Kentucky, scotch whisky in Scotland, and tequila in Mexico. To fit the network's format, Modern Marvels focuses a significant portion of the episode on the history of the subject. The introduction of Modern Marvels features visuals and sounds of a bolt being turned by an adjustable wrench, followed by a partially computer-generated sequence involving construction workers building and hanging the title.

A former title screenshot of Modern Marvels

The show premiered new episodes in January 2010, not having done so through all of 2009. In August 2010, History Channel began to air older episodes that had been edited to fit a 30-minute time slot, under the title Modern Marvels: Essentials.

In October 2011, Modern Marvels began airing first-run episodes on History 2 (formerly History International) in addition to its main run on History Channel.

Reruns of the series air on the digital broadcast networks Quest and Story Television. Select episodes of the series can also be found on YouTube.

On January 14, 2021, revival of the series was announced; it premiered on History, on February 21, 2021.

== Narration ==
Modern Marvels has had several narrators. The last and longest-running is Max Raphael, who also narrated other History Channel series such as Command Decisions.

The History Channel repackaged some episodes that originally aired in other series and stand-alone specials into episodes of Modern Marvels, such as Ice Road Truckers, which originally aired in 2000 as part of the series Suicide Missions. These episodes are not narrated by Raphael.

Former Man vs. Food host Adam Richman hosts the 2021 revival. This has sparked negative reviews from series' viewers.

== Engineering Disasters ==
Occasionally, Modern Marvels aired a special spin-off called Engineering Disasters. These periodic episodes describe the circumstances of situations in which technology does not work correctly, such as building collapses and airplane crashes, resulting in spectacular (and sometimes fatal) failures. Including an episode on New Orleans and another on the 1970s, 24 original Engineering Disasters episodes have been on Modern Marvels. The packaging on the box set of Engineering Disasters episodes 4-20 (as well as the episode covering New Orleans) describe the series as such: "Dark clouds with silver linings, Modern Marvels: Engineering Disasters presents the tragic, yet invaluable, handmaidens of technological progress."

== Episodes ==
| Season | Episodes | Originally released | |
| Season | Episodes | First released | Last released |
|---|---|---|---|
| 1 | 4 | December 10, 1993 | May 29, 1994 |
| 2 | 29 | January 15, 1995 | June 22, 1997 |
| 3 | 16 | August 17, 1997 | February 14, 1998 |
| 4 | 29 | August 3, 1998 | February 22, 1999 |
| 5 | 34 | March 3, 1999 | December 13, 1999 |
| 6 | 46 | February 3, 2000 | December 18, 2000 |
| 7 | 65 | January 3, 2001 | December 1, 2001 |
| 8 | 50 | December 2, 2002 | December 17, 2002 |
| 9 | 59 | January 7, 2003 | December 23, 2003 |
| 10 | 69 | February 4, 2004 | December 28, 2004 |
| 11 | 60 | January 12, 2005 | December 30, 2005 |
| 12 | 54 | January 4, 2006 | December 20, 2006 |
| 13 | 44 | January 17, 2007 | December 26, 2007 |
| 14 | 38 | January 14, 2008 | December 23, 2008 |
| 15 | 33 | October 28, 2009 | December 29, 2010 |
| 16 | 22 | January 14, 2011 | February 27, 2012 |
| 17 | 10 | July 16, 2012 | June 15, 2014 |
| 18 | 8 | February 21, 2021 | April 11, 2021 |
| 19 | 4 | July 25, 2021 | August 15, 2021 |
| 20 | 2 | November 28, 2021 | December 5, 2021 |
| 21 | 15 | February 16, 2022 | August 8, 2022 |
