= Kwayzar =

American rapper

- Also known as: Skip Stanley
- Born: Stanley Jerry Hoffman; February 11, 1928; Los Angeles, California, U.S.
- Died: March 11, 2018 (aged 90) Downey, California, U.S.
- Genres: Rockabilly, rap
- Occupations: Singer, realtor
- Years active: 1957, 2011-2012

Stanley Hoffman, also known as Kwayzar and Skip Stanley; 11 February 1928 – 11 March 2018) was an American singer and rapper from Southern California, known for his octogenarian rap performances. He was inspired by artists such as Ice Cube and Eminem.

During World War II, he served in the United States Navy, and he also tried a career as a comedian and actor, but although he was in many movies he never made it big. Under the pseudonym Skip Stanley, in 1957, he recorded the atomic music song, "Satellite Baby." In between his singing career and his rap career, Kwayzar was a realtor.

Risher Mortuary posted an online memorial indicating that Hoffman had passed on March 11, 2018, at the age of 90.
