= David Saperstein =

David Saperstein may refer to:

- David Saperstein (rabbi) (born 1947), rabbi, lawyer, and Reform Jewish community leader
- David I. Saperstein, American entrepreneur, billionaire and farmer
- David Saperstein (SEC official) (1901 – 1990), American lawyer and federal regulator, associate counsel to the Pecora Commission and founding director of the U.S. Securities and Exchange Commission’s Division of Trading and Exchange under Joseph P. Kennedy Sr.
