= Harlan Saperstein =

American voice actor

Harlan Saperstein is an American voice actor. He has worked as a television narrator of several documentaries on E! True Hollywood Story and History Channel.

== Documentaries ==
- Pioneers Of Television (2007–2008)
- Modern Marvels (1995–2007)
- History's Mysteries: "The Bible Code"
- Decoding the Past: "The Other Nostradamus" (2005)
- Decoding the Past: "Nazi Prophecies" (2005)
- Biography: "Gandhi: Pilgrim of Peace" (2005)
- The Bible Code II: Apocalypse and Beyond (2004)
- Dog Tag Anthologies (2004)
- The E! True Hollywood Story
