= National Register of Historic Places listings in Fayette County, West Virginia =

Location of Fayette County in West Virginia

This is a list of the National Register of Historic Places listings in Fayette County, West Virginia.

This is intended to be a complete list of the properties and districts on the National Register of Historic Places in Fayette County, West Virginia, United States. The locations of National Register properties and districts for which the latitude and longitude coordinates are included below, may be seen in an online map.

There are 28 properties and districts listed on the National Register in the county.

This National Park Service list is complete through NPS recent listings posted December 12, 2025.

Contents: Counties in West Virginia

Barbour - Berkeley - Boone - Braxton - Brooke - Cabell - Calhoun - Clay - Doddridge - Fayette - Gilmer - Grant - Greenbrier - Hampshire - Hancock - Hardy - Harrison - Jackson - Jefferson - Kanawha - Lewis - Lincoln - Logan - Marion - Marshall - Mason - McDowell - Mercer - Mineral - Mingo - Monongalia - Monroe - Morgan - Nicholas - Ohio - Pendleton - Pleasants - Pocahontas - Preston - Putnam - Raleigh - Randolph - Ritchie - Roane - Summers - Taylor - Tucker - Tyler - Upshur - Wayne - Webster - Wetzel - Wirt - Wood - Wyoming

== Current listings ==
| | Name on the Register | Image | Date listed | Location | City or town | Description |
|---|---|---|---|---|---|---|
| 1 | Altamont Hotel | Altamont Hotel | August 29, 1979 (#79002574) | 110 Fayette Ave. 38°03′09″N 81°06′07″W | Fayetteville | |
| 2 | Bank of Glen Jean | Bank of Glen Jean | February 10, 1983 (#83003236) | Main St. 37°55′42″N 81°09′19″W | Glen Jean | |
| 3 | Camp Washington-Carver Complex | Camp Washington-Carver Complex | June 20, 1980 (#80004017) | County Route 11/3; 38°00′36″N 80°58′14″W | Clifftop | |
| 4 | Contentment | Contentment | December 30, 1974 (#74001996) | Along U.S. Route 60; 38°08′06″N 81°06′11″W | Ansted | |
| 5 | Fayette County Courthouse | Fayette County Courthouse | September 6, 1978 (#78002793) | Court St. between Wiseman and Maple Aves. 38°03′13″N 81°06′13″W | Fayetteville | |
| 6 | Fayetteville Esso Station | Fayetteville Esso Station | December 4, 2018 (#100003250) | 145 S Court St. 38°03′07″N 81°06′08″W | Fayetteville | |
| 7 | Fayetteville Historic District | Fayetteville Historic District | December 20, 1990 (#90001845) | Roughly bounded by WV 16 and Maple and Fayette Aves. 38°03′05″N 81°06′25″W | Fayetteville | |
| 8 | Gauley Bridge Railroad Station | Gauley Bridge Railroad Station | May 15, 1980 (#80004018) | Off WV 16/WV 39; 38°09′53″N 81°11′46″W | Gauley Bridge | |
| 9 | Glen Ferris Inn | Glen Ferris Inn | April 25, 1991 (#91000449) | U.S. Route 60 overlooking Kanawha Falls; 38°09′01″N 81°12′53″W | Glen Ferris | |
| 10 | Halfway House | Halfway House | December 18, 1978 (#78002792) | Off old U.S. Route 60; 38°08′05″N 81°05′39″W | Ansted | |
| 11 | E. B. Hawkins House | E. B. Hawkins House | January 18, 1990 (#89002319) | 120 Fayette Ave. 38°03′12″N 81°06′02″W | Fayetteville | |
| 12 | Dr. John Hughart House | Dr. John Hughart House | March 26, 2001 (#01000262) | Off WV 41; 37°58′15″N 80°56′07″W | Landisburg | |
| 13 | Kay Moor | Kay Moor | November 8, 1990 (#90001641) | Along the New River south of U.S. Route 19; 38°02′52″N 81°03′53″W | Fayetteville | |
| 14 | Main Building | Main Building | June 25, 1980 (#80004019) | West Virginia University Institute of Technology campus 38°10′45″N 81°19′31″W | Montgomery | |
| 15 | Mount Hope Historic District | Mount Hope Historic District | August 3, 2007 (#07000785) | Portions of Main, Tennessee, Montana, and Virginia Sts., Fayette and Mountain Aves., Stadium Dr., N. Pax Ave., and N. Maryland; 37°53′33″N 81°10′04″W | Mount Hope | |
| 16 | New Deal Resources in Babcock State Park Historic District | | March 5, 2020 (#100003518) | 486 Babcock Rd. 37°59′43″N 80°57′14″W | Clifftop | |
| 17 | New Deal Resources in Hawk's Nest State Park Historic District | New Deal Resources in Hawk's Nest State Park Historic District | February 4, 2011 (#10001225) | 49 Hawks Nest State Park Rd. 38°07′23″N 81°07′13″W | Ansted | |
| 18 | New River Company General Office Building | New River Company General Office Building | April 21, 2004 (#04000357) | 411 Main St. 37°53′47″N 81°09′56″W | Mt. Hope | |
| 19 | New River Gorge Bridge | New River Gorge Bridge | August 14, 2013 (#13000603) | US 19 over New River; 38°04′06″N 81°05′00″W | Fayetteville | |
| 20 | Nuttallburg Coal Mining Complex and Town Historic District | Nuttallburg Coal Mining Complex and Town Historic District | August 22, 2007 (#07000846) | County Route 85/2; 38°03′00″N 81°02′25″W | Nuttallburg | |
| 21 | Oak Hill High School | | September 4, 2020 (#100004283) | 140 School St. 37°58′29″N 81°08′56″W | Oak Hill | |
| 22 | Oak Hill Railroad Depot | Oak Hill Railroad Depot | March 17, 1995 (#95000255) | Junction of Virginia Ave. and Central Ave. 37°58′38″N 81°08′58″W | Oak Hill | |
| 23 | Page-Vawter House | Page-Vawter House | August 21, 1985 (#85001813) | Route Box 20; 38°08′13″N 81°06′06″W | Ansted | |
| 24 | Prince Brothers General Store-Berry Store | Prince Brothers General Store-Berry Store | April 17, 1986 (#86000810) | WV 41; 37°51′22″N 81°03′49″W | Prince | |
| 25 | Soldiers and Sailors Memorial Building | Soldiers and Sailors Memorial Building | May 31, 2016 (#16000312) | 200 W. Maple Ave. 38°03′07″N 81°06′19″W | Fayetteville | |
| 26 | Thurmond Historic District | Thurmond Historic District | January 27, 1984 (#84003520) | County Route 25/2 at New River; 37°57′29″N 81°04′40″W | Thurmond | |
| 27 | Tyree Stone Tavern | Tyree Stone Tavern | June 20, 1975 (#75001884) | East of Clifftop off U.S. Route 19 on County Route 10; 38°00′42″N 80°54′18″W | Clifftop | |
| 28 | Whipple Company Store | Whipple Company Store | April 26, 1991 (#91000448) | Junction of WV 612 and County Route 21/20; 37°57′31″N 81°09′57″W | Scarbro | |

== See also ==
- List of National Historic Landmarks in West Virginia
- National Register of Historic Places listings in West Virginia
- National Register of Historic Places listings in New River Gorge National Park and Preserve
