= Fayetteville Historic District =

Fayetteville Historic District may refer to:

- Fayetteville Downtown Historic District, Fayetteville, North Carolina, listed on the NRHP in Cumberland County, North Carolina
- Fayetteville Street Historic District, Raleigh, NC, listed on the NRHP in North Carolina
- Fayetteville Historic District (Fayetteville, Texas), listed on the National Register of Historic Places in Fayette County, Texas
- Fayetteville Historic District (Fayetteville, West Virginia), listed on the National Register of Historic Places in Fayette County, West Virginia
