= Soldiers and Sailors Memorial Building =

Soldiers and Sailors Memorial Building may refer to:

- Soldiers and Sailors Memorial Building (Kansas City, Kansas), listed on the National Register of Historic Places (NRHP) in Wyandotte County
- Soldiers and Sailors Memorial Building (West Newbury, Massachusetts), NRHP-listed in Essex County
- Soldiers and Sailors Memorial Building (Fayetteville, West Virginia), NRHP-listed in Fayette County
