= Whipple Company Store =

- U.S. National Register of Historic Places
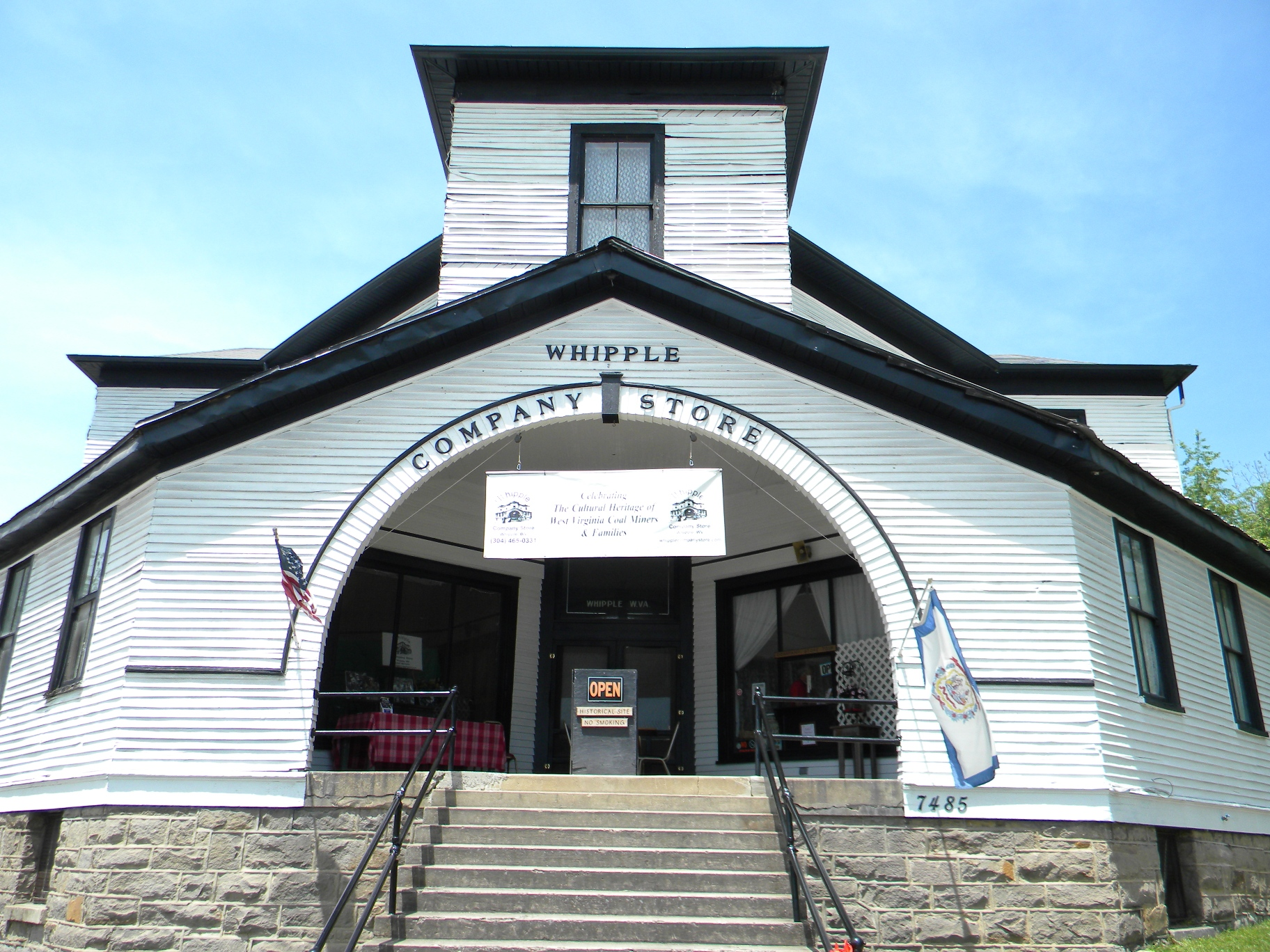

- Location within West Virginia Location within the United States
- Location: 7485 Okey L. Patteson Road, Whipple, West Virginia (Addressed to Scarbro)
- Coordinates: 37°57′31″N 81°9′57″W
- Area: less than one acre
- Architect: Whipple Colliery Co.
- Architectural style: Romanesque revival
- NRHP reference No.: 91000448
- Added to NRHP: April 26, 1991

Whipple Company Store is a historic company store located in Whipple, West Virginia, United States. It was built about 1900, and is a two-story, frame octagon building. It sits on a coursed stone faced foundation and features a prominent arched opening at the main entrance. As a company store, it remained in operation until August 1957, when the New River Company mine closed. However, it remained occupied by retail activities until the 1980s.

It was listed on the National Register of Historic Places in 1991.
