= Gauley =

Gauley may refer to:

- Gauley Artillery, American Civil War unit in West Virginia
- Gauley Bridge, West Virginia, town in West Virginia
- Gauley Bridge station, railroad station in West Virginia
- Gauley Mills, West Virginia, unincorporated community in West Virginia
- Gauley River, river in West Virginia
- Gauley River National Recreation Area, protected area in West Virginia
- Gauley Subdivision, railroad line in West Virginia
