= Soldiers and Sailors Memorial Building (Fayetteville, West Virginia) =

Historic building in Fayetteville, West Virginia

- U.S. National Register of Historic Places
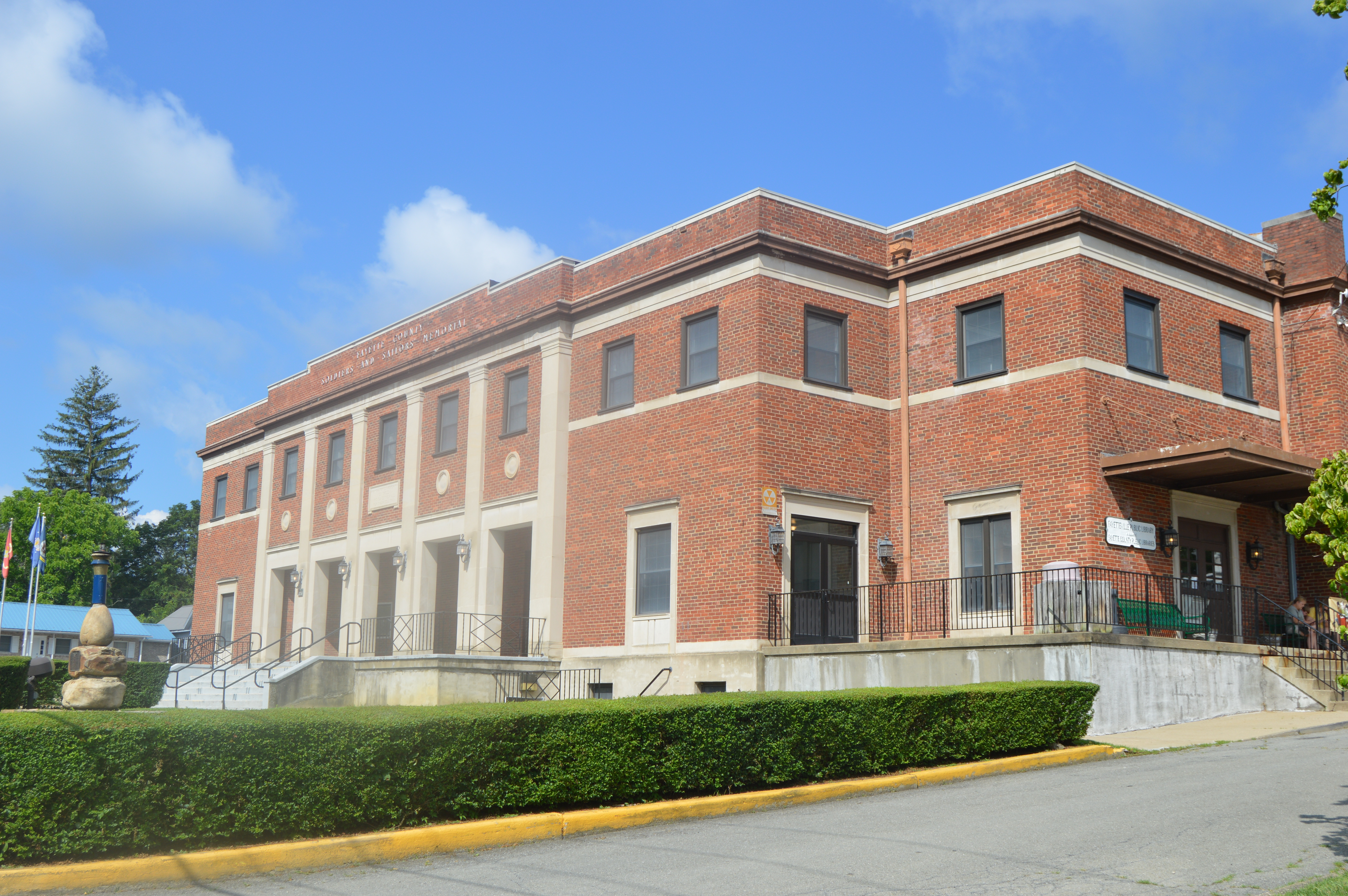
- Soldiers and Sailors Memorial Building, in 2021.

- Location within West Virginia Location within the United States
- Location: 200 W Maple Ave, Fayetteville, West Virginia 25840
- Coordinates: 38°03′07″N 81°06′19″W
- Built: 1951
- Architectural style: Classical Revival
- NRHP reference No.: 16000312
- Added to NRHP: 2007

The Soldiers and Sailors Memorial Building is a war memorial located in Fayetteville, West Virginia.

== Description ==
The Soldiers and Sailors Memorial Building is a Neoclassical architecture structure located in downtown Fayetteville, one block from the Fayette County Courthouse. Designed by architect L.T. Bengtson and built by Hill Company, Inc., the brick building features smooth stone accents and occupies most of its lot on West Maple Avenue.

The two-story front section has a flat roof with decorative stone coping and a symmetrical façade. Its most prominent feature is a projecting center unit with three recessed main entrances accessed by wide steps leading to a 9-foot-deep platform. Six squared stone pilasters extend through the second story to the cornice, with replacement lamps added in the 1980s.

The building was added to the NRHP in 2016.

== See also ==
- National Register of Historic Places in Fayette County, West Virginia
