= Esso Station (Fayetteville, West Virginia) =

Historic building in Fayetteville, West Virginia

- U.S. National Register of Historic Places
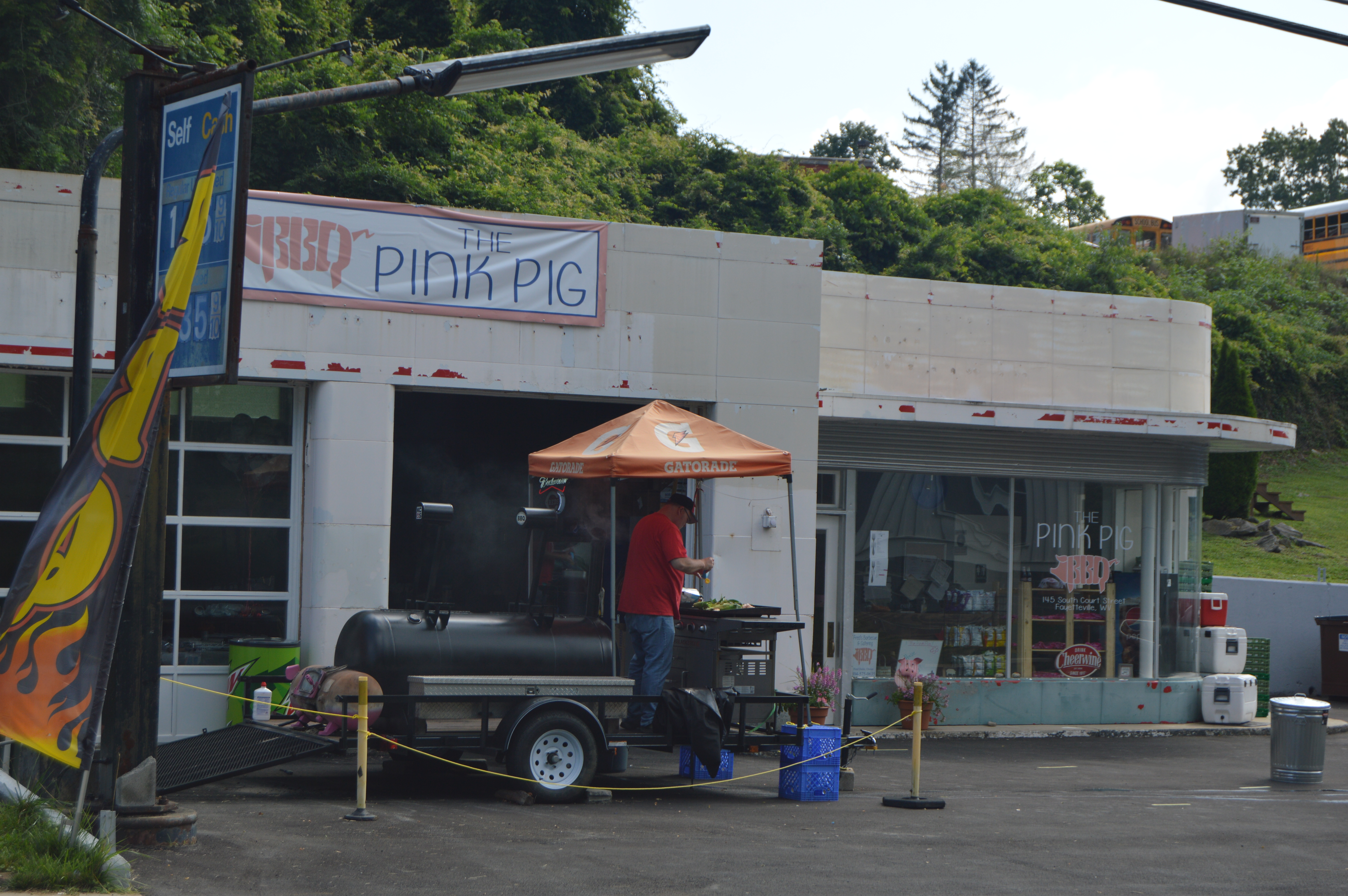
- Esso Station in 2020

- Location within West Virginia Location within the United States
- Location: 145 S Court St, Fayetteville, West Virginia 25840
- Coordinates: 38°03′07″N 81°06′08″W
- Built: 1945
- Architectural style: Modern
- NRHP reference No.: 100003250
- Added to NRHP: 2018

The Esso Station is a gas station located in Fayetteville, West Virginia. The building was added to the NRHP in 2018.

== Description ==
The Fayetteville Esso Station is a historic service station located at 145 South Court Street in Fayetteville, West Virginia. The structure sits just outside the boundary of the Fayetteville Historic District, which is listed on the National Register of Historic Places, in an area characterized by mixed commercial and residential development. Fayetteville serves as the county seat of Fayette County in the coalfields of southern West Virginia.

The northwest-facing building occupies the rear northeast corner of its lot, which fronts West Virginia Route 16. The property features a concrete-surfaced parking area and is bordered on three sides by a concrete retaining wall of varying heights. Along the north and west elevations, this retaining wall serves a dual purpose as the building's foundation wall.

== See also ==
- National Register of Historic Places in Fayette County, West Virginia
