= Charlie Shields (1940s pitcher) =

American baseball player

- Pitcher
- Born: October 20, 1922; Whipple, West Virginia, U.S.
- Died: October 18, 1955 (aged 32); Scarbro, West Virginia, U.S.
- Batted: Left Threw: Left

Negro league baseball debut
- 1941, for the New York Cubans

Last appearance
- 1943, for the Homestead Grays

Teams
- New York Cubans (1941); Chicago American Giants (1941–1943); Homestead Grays (1943)

Charles Thomas Shields (October 20, 1922 – October 18, 1955) was an American Negro league pitcher in the 1940s.

A native of Whipple, West Virginia, Shields made his Negro leagues debut in 1941 with the New York Cubans and Chicago American Giants. He remained with Chicago in 1942 and 1943. Shields also pitched for the Homestead Grays during their 1943 Negro World Series championship season, posting a 3–0 record in five appearances. He died in Scarbro, West Virginia in 1955 at age 32.
