= Fayetteville Historic District (Fayetteville, West Virginia) =

Historic district in West Virginia, United States

- U.S. National Register of Historic Places
- U.S. Historic district
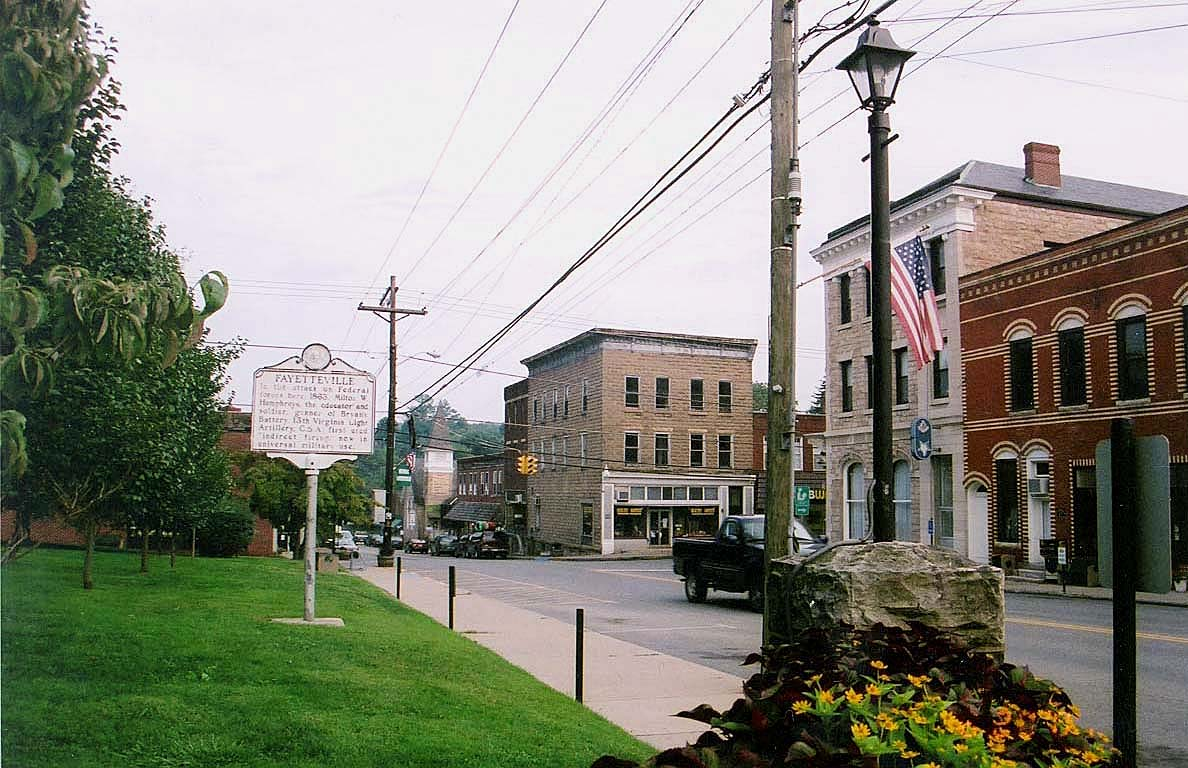
- Court Street, August 2004

- Location within West Virginia Location within the United States
- Location: Roughly bounded by SR 16, Maple and Fayette Aves., Fayetteville, West Virginia
- Coordinates: 38°3′5″N 81°6′25″W
- Area: 115 acres (47 ha)
- Architect: Multiple
- Architectural style: Colonial Revival, Greek Revival, Gothic Revival
- NRHP reference No.: 90001845
- Added to NRHP: December 20, 1990

Fayetteville Historic District is a national historic district located at Fayetteville, Fayette County, West Virginia. The district encompasses 126 contributing buildings, 4 contributing sites, and 3 contributing structures. It includes the central business district and surrounding residential areas of Fayetteville. Notable buildings include Jack's Garage (1934), Theatre Building (1935), Fayette County Jail (1907), McClung House (1850), Old Methodist Church (c. 1905), Old Post Office (1920), Bank of Fayette-Town Hall (1921), U.S. Post Office (1938), and the War Memorial Building (1949). Also in the district is the site of Fort Toland, site of Fort Scammon and the Old Fayetteville Cemetery. The district includes the separately listed Fayette County Courthouse, E. B. Hawkins House, and Altamont Hotel.

It was listed on the National Register of Historic Places in 1990.
