= George Cafego =

American football player and coach (1915–1998)

No. 72, 23, 32, 11
- Positions: Fullback, quarterback, halfback

Personal information
- Born: August 29, 1915; Whipple, West Virginia, U.S.
- Died: February 9, 1998 (aged 82); Knoxville, Tennessee, U.S.
- Listed height: 5 ft 10 in (1.78 m)
- Listed weight: 169 lb (77 kg)

Career information
- High school: Oak Hill (Oak Hill, West Virginia)
- College: Tennessee
- NFL draft: 1940: 1st round, 1st overall pick

Career history

Playing
- Brooklyn Dodgers (1940, 1943); Washington Redskins (1943); Boston Yanks (1944–1945)

Coaching
- Furman (1948) Backfield; Wyoming (1949–1952) Assistant; Arkansas (1953–1954) Assistant; Tennessee (1955–1963) Backfield; Tennessee (1964–1973) Assistant; Tennessee (1974–1984) Special teams; Denver Broncos (1986) Assistant; Minnesota Vikings (1987) Assistant

Awards and highlights
- Consensus All-American (1939); First-team All-American (1938); SEC Player of the Year (1938); 2× First-team All-SEC (1938, 1939); Second-team All-SEC (1937)

Career NFL statistics
- TD–INT: 5–16
- Passing yards: 966
- Passer rating: 37.7
- Rushing yards: 77
- Rushing touchdowns: 1
- Receptions: 13
- Receiving yards: 133
- Stats at Pro Football Reference
- College Football Hall of Fame

George Cafego (/ˈkæfəɡoʊ/ KAF-ə-goh; August 29, 1915 – February 9, 1998) was an American football player and coach of football and baseball. He played college football for the Tennessee Volunteers, and professionally in the National Football League (NFL) with the Brooklyn Dodgers, Washington Redskins, and Boston Yanks. He served as the head baseball coach at the University of Wyoming in 1950 and at his alma mater, Tennessee, from 1958 to 1962.

== Career ==
=== High school and collegiate career ===
Born in rural Whipple, West Virginia to John Cafego and Mary (Rednock) Cafego, Cafego attended Oak Hill High School in nearby Oak Hill. Cafego was able to finish high school because his brother, Tom Cafego, supported the family by playing professional baseball during the summers and mining coal the rest of the year.

Cafego went to the University of Tennessee, where he played for the Tennessee Volunteers as a halfback under coach Robert Neyland. While there, he earned varsity letters from 1937 to 1939, and compiled 2,139 total yards and two All-American team selections. He was also a finalist for the Heisman Memorial Trophy. In addition to running and passing the ball, Cafego also served as punter and kickoff returner, excelling at both. At Tennessee, his nickname was "Bad News". As a sophomore, his first year on the varsity, he already showed signs of success, catching "many an expert eye." Cafego was inducted into the College Football Hall of Fame as a player in 1969.

=== Professional career ===
Cafego was selected as the number one overall pick in the 1940 NFL draft by the Chicago Cardinals. He eventually played for the Brooklyn Dodgers. After playing one season, his career was interrupted by a brief stint of Army service in World War II era. During this time he appeared in several games for the Newport News Builders of the Dixie League. Returning to the Dodgers in 1943, he was traded to the Washington Redskins after five unspectacular games. For the 1944 and 1945 seasons, Cafego played for the Boston Yanks before retiring.

=== Coaching career ===
After his playing career was over, Cafego served as an assistant coach at Wyoming, Furman, Arkansas, and 30 years at his alma mater, Tennessee, serving under a total of six different head coaches during his UTK coaching career. He was also the head coach of Tennessee's baseball team from 1958 to 1962. He retired from coaching following the 1984 season.

== Personal life ==
His brother Tom Cafego played briefly in Major League Baseball (MLB), in 1937.

=== Death ===
Cafego died in Knoxville, Tennessee, at the age of 82 and was buried in his native Fayette County in West Virginia.
