= Glen Jean, West Virginia =

- Census-designated place (CDP)
- Location within the state of West Virginia Glen Jean (the United States)
- Coordinates: 37°55′35″N 81°09′00″W
- Country: United States
- State: West Virginia
- County: Fayette
- Incorporated: 1898

Area
  - Total: 0.226 sq mi (0.59 km^{2})
  - Land: 0.226 sq mi (0.59 km^{2})
  - Water: 0 sq mi (0 km^{2})

Population (2020)
  - Total: 90
  - Density: 400/sq mi (150/km^{2})
- Time zone: UTC-5 (Eastern (EST))
  - Summer (DST): UTC-4 (EDT)

Glen Jean is a census-designated place (CDP) in Fayette County, West Virginia, United States, near Oak Hill. As of the 2020 census, its population was 90 (down from 210 at the 2010 census).

== History ==
The area had been known as White Oaks, but when the town was founded in the early 1870s the community was named for Jean McKell, the wife of landowner Thomas G. McKell. The town was a center for the coal mining industry and a railroad junction, formerly boasting an opera house, hotels and a company store. Glen Jean was incorporated in 1898. Much of the town has disappeared since the end of the coal boom. The chief remaining structure is the Bank of Glen Jean, listed on the National Register of Historic Places. Glen Jean is the headquarters of New River Gorge National Park and Preserve, located across the street from the bank building, which now functions as a visitor contact center. Glen Jean is also home to the Boy Scouts of America's national high adventure base, The Summit Bechtel Reserve. Glen Jean held the 24th World Scout Jamboree in 2019.

The latitude of Glen Jean is 37.926 N. The longitude is 81.15 W. It is in the Eastern Time Zone. The elevation is 1,627 feet.

Nearby parks and recreation sites include the Bluestone National Scenic River, the Gauley River National Recreation Area, and the New River Gorge National Park and Preserve.
