= Bank of Glen Jean =

- U.S. National Register of Historic Places
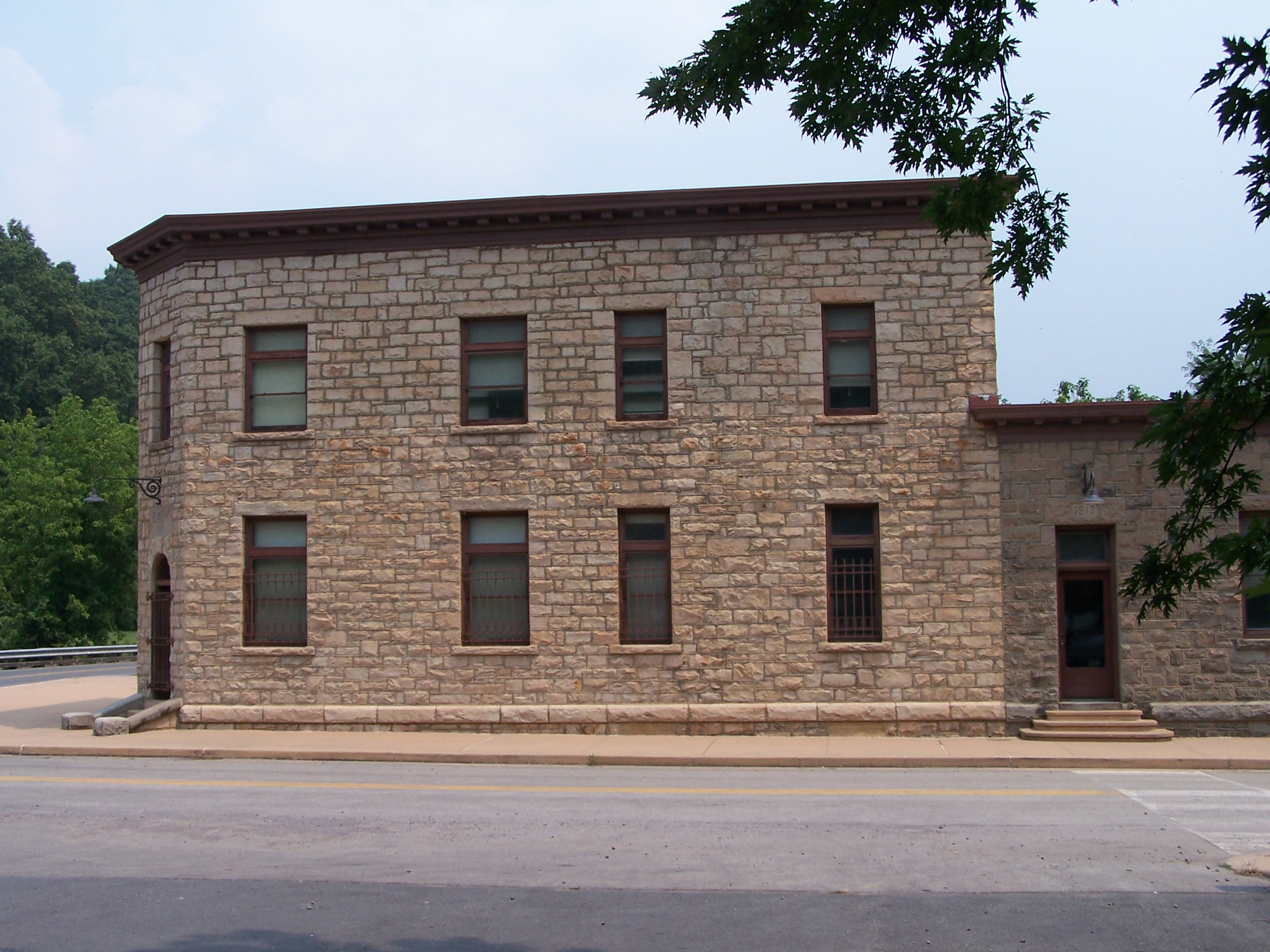

- Location within West Virginia Location within the United States
- Location: Main St., Glen Jean, West Virginia
- Coordinates: 37°55′42″N 81°9′19″W
- Built: 1909
- NRHP reference No.: 83003236
- Added to NRHP: February 10, 1983

The Bank of Glen Jean is located in the unincorporated community of Glen Jean, West Virginia. The bank was the financial center of a railroading, mining and financial conglomerate belonging to William McKell, son of Thomas G. and Jean McKell, the town's namesake. Built in 1909, the bank operated until 1939. It is now a visitor contact center for New River Gorge National Park and Preserve.

The bank is built in stone masonry, using local sandstone found above the Sewell coal seam. Exterior walls are 28 inches thick. The floors and roof are of steel construction. A panel above the door reads "Bank 1909." A 1917 addition constructed for McKell's coal and railroad operations uses wood floors and roof. The sign above its entrance states "McKell." The bank resembles a smaller version of the 1907 Fayette County National Bank in Fayetteville.
