= Tom Cafego =

American baseball player

- Outfielder
- Born: August 21, 1911; Whipple, West Virginia, U.S.
- Died: October 29, 1961 (aged 50); Detroit, Michigan, U.S.
- Batted: Left Threw: Right

MLB debut
- September 3, 1937, for the St. Louis Browns

Last MLB appearance
- September 9, 1937, for the St. Louis Browns

MLB statistics
- Games played: 4
- At bats: 4
- Hits: 0
- Stats at Baseball Reference

Teams
- St. Louis Browns (1937)

Thomas Cafego (/ˈkæfəɡoʊ/ KAF-ə-goh; August 21, 1911 – October 29, 1961) was an American baseball player who played briefly in Major League Baseball as an outfielder. He played for the St. Louis Browns in 1937.

He was the brother of College Football Hall of Famer George Cafego, who played as a halfback at the University of Tennessee. Thomas Cafego supported his family, thereby helping his brother finish school, by playing professional baseball and working in coal mines during the offseasons.
