= Prince Brothers General Store =

- Prince Brothers General Store–Berry Store
- U.S. National Register of Historic Places
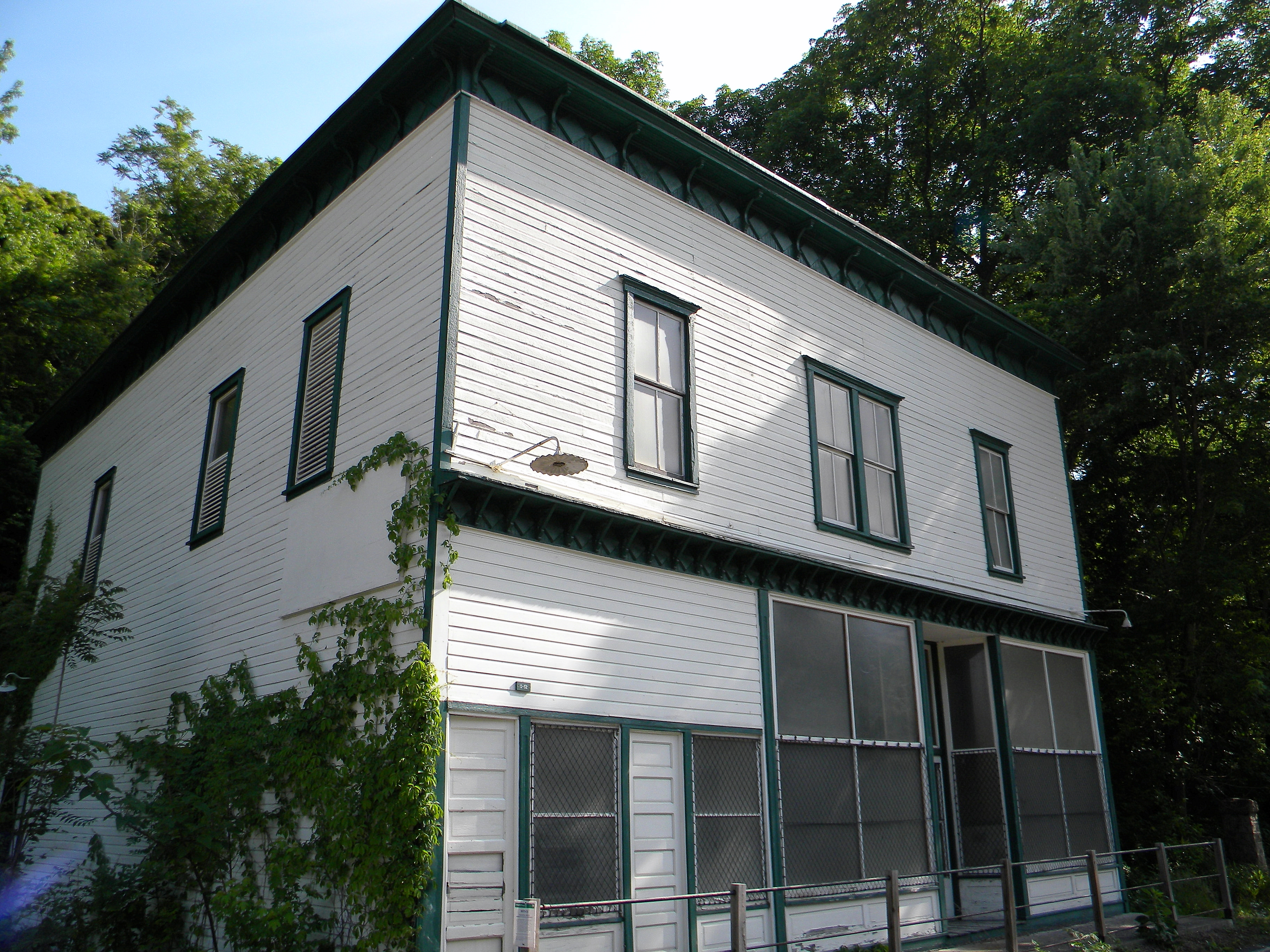
- Prince Brothers Store

- Location within West Virginia Location within the United States
- Location: WV 41, Prince, West Virginia
- Coordinates: 37°51′22″N 81°3′49″W
- Area: 0.5 acres (0.20 ha)
- Built: c. 1900
- Architectural style: Boomtown
- NRHP reference No.: 86000810
- Added to NRHP: April 17, 1986

Prince Brothers General Store, also known as the Berry Store or simply Prince Store, is a historic general store located at Prince, Fayette County, West Virginia. It was built about 1900, and is a two-story frame commercial building. It is the last surviving building of the New River coal field commercial businesses dated to the turn of the 20th century. It is owned by the National Park Service as part of the New River Gorge National Park and Preserve.

It was listed on the National Register of Historic Places in 1986.
