= Landisburg, West Virginia =

- Unincorporated community
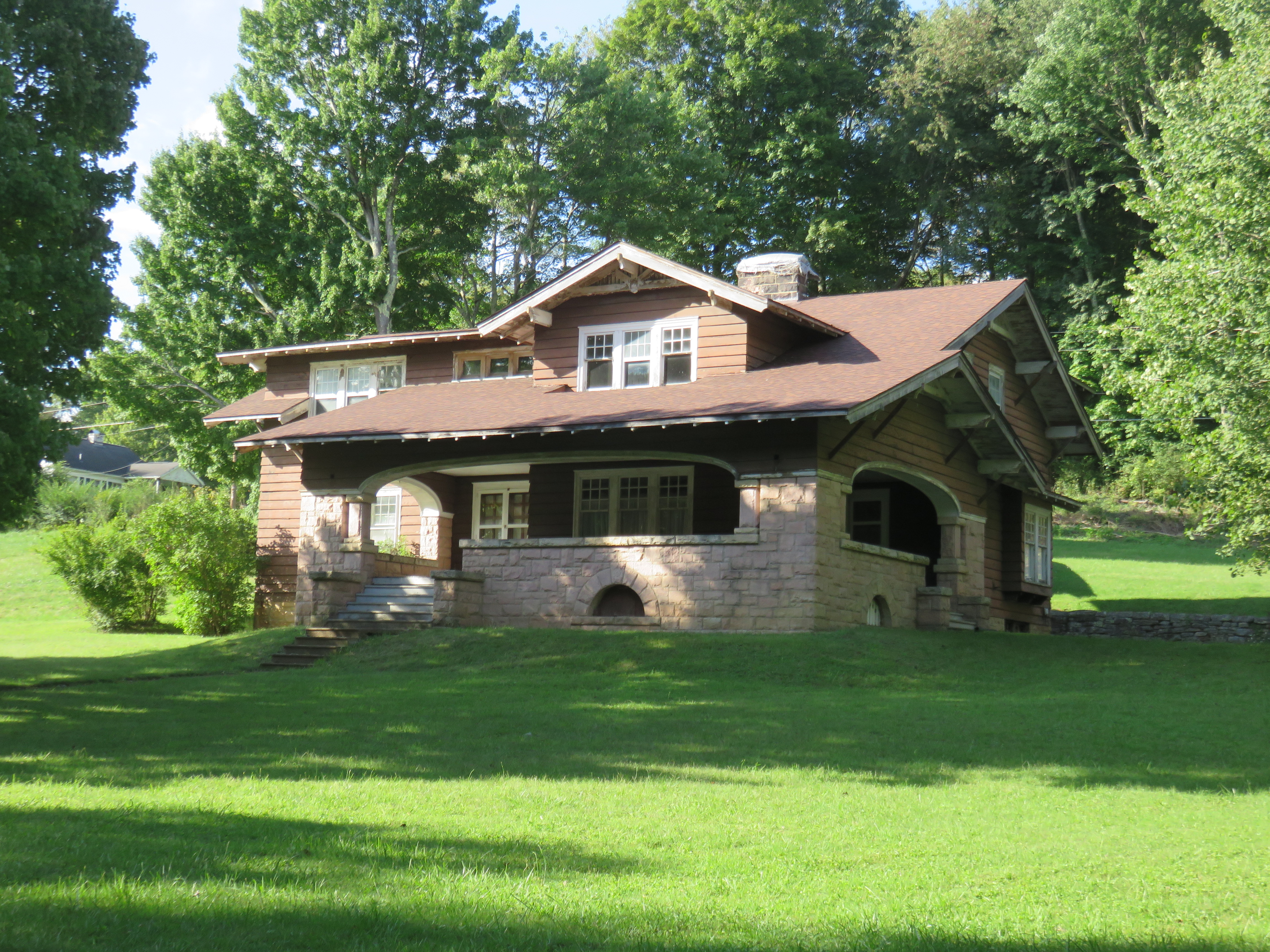
- Dr. John Hughart House in 2021

- Location within West Virginia Location within the United States
- Coordinates: 37°58′37″N 80°56′24″W
- Country: United States
- State: West Virginia
- County: Fayette
- Elevation: 2,497 ft (761 m)
- Time zone: UTC-5 (Eastern (EST))
  - Summer (DST): UTC-4 (EDT)
- Area codes: 304 & 681
- GNIS feature ID: 1554908

Landisburg is an unincorporated community in Fayette County, West Virginia, United States. Landisburg is located along West Virginia Route 41, 11 miles (18 km) east of Oak Hill.

The community was named after H. M. Landis, a businessperson in the lumber industry. The Dr. John Hughart House was listed on the National Register of Historic Places in 2001.
