= Dr. John Hughart House =

Historic house in West Virginia, United States

- U.S. National Register of Historic Places
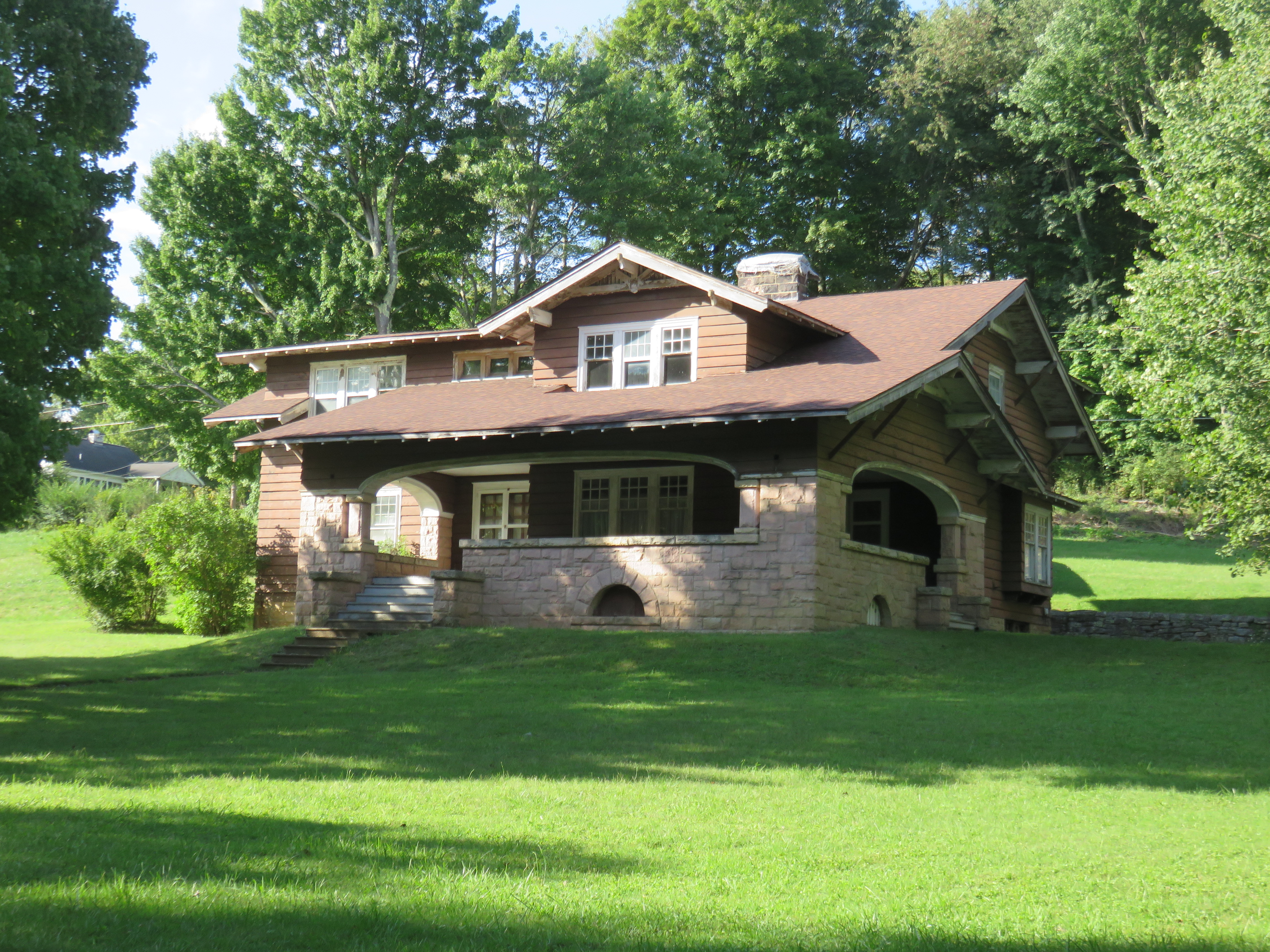
- Dr. John Hughart House in 2021

- Location within West Virginia Location within the United States
- Location: Off WV 41, Landisburg, West Virginia
- Coordinates: 37.9728°N 80.9353°W
- Area: 0 acres (0 ha)
- Architectural style: American Craftsman
- NRHP reference No.: 01000262
- Added to NRHP: March 26, 2001

Dr. John Hughart House is a historic home located at Landisburg, Fayette County, West Virginia. It was built in 1917, and is constructed of wood and stone in the American Craftsman style. It features a broad front porch with a long, segmental arch fascia with no center support. Also on the property is a contributing spring house (1917) and garage / office (1917).

It was listed on the National Register of Historic Places in 2001.
