= New River Gorge National Park and Preserve =

National park and preserve in West Virginia, United States

- IUCN category V (protected landscape/seascape)
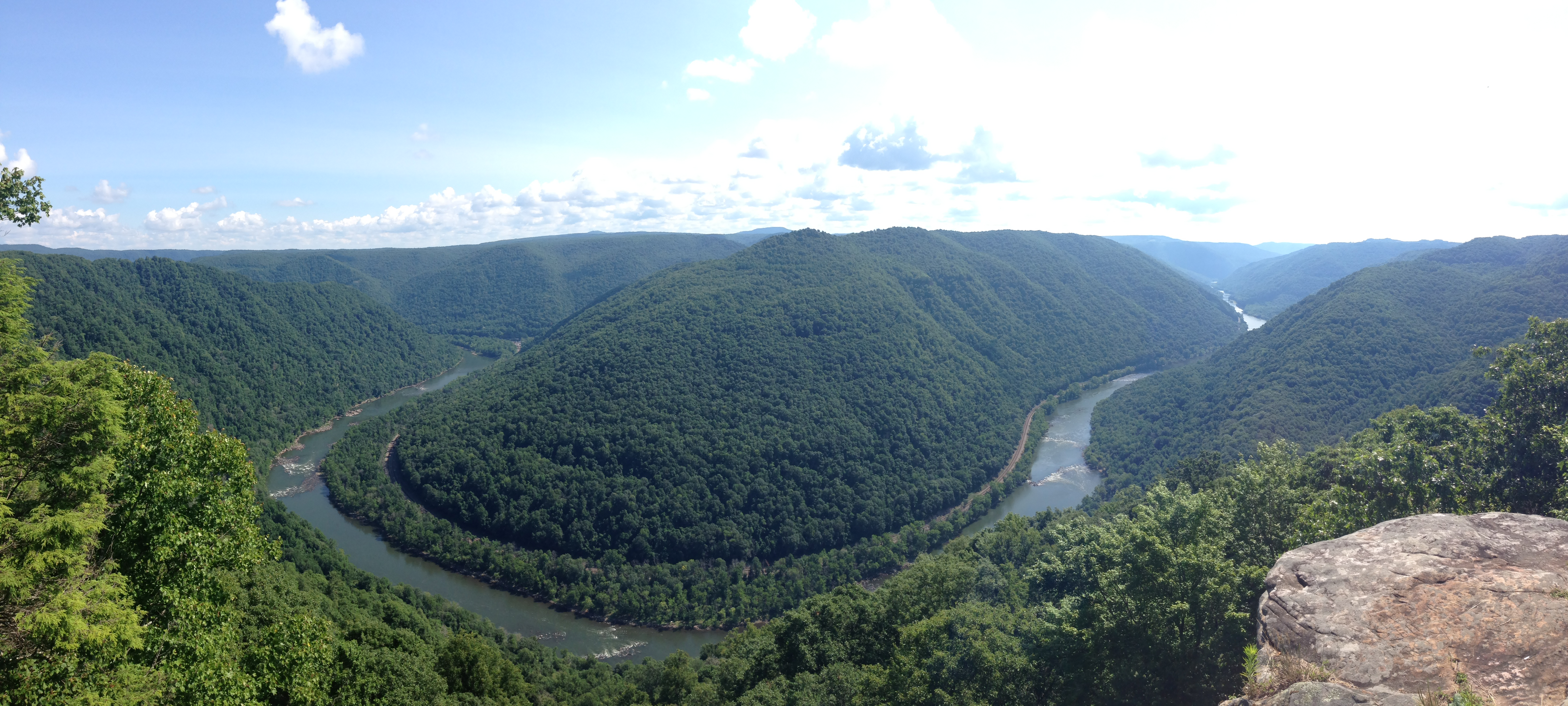
- The New River view from the Grandview portion of the national park

- Location within West Virginia Location within the United States
- Interactive map of New River Gorge National Park and Preserve
- Location: Fayette, Raleigh, and Summers counties, West Virginia, US
- Nearest city: Fayetteville, West Virginia
- Coordinates: 37°57′39″N 81°4′54″W
- Area: 72,808 acres (294.64 km^{2})
- Established: November 10, 1978, as a national river December 27, 2020, as a national park
- Visitors: 1,593,523 (in 2022)
- Governing body: National Park Service
- Website: New River Gorge National Park and Preserve

The New River Gorge National Park and Preserve is a United States national park and preserve designed to protect and maintain the New River Gorge in southern West Virginia in the Appalachian Mountains. Established in 1978 as a national river and redesignated in 2020, the park and preserve stretches for 53 miles (85 km) from just downstream of Hinton to Hawks Nest State Park near Ansted.

The park is rich in cultural and natural history and offers an abundance of scenic and recreational opportunities. New River Gorge has some of the country's best whitewater rafting, mainly from the Cunard put-in to the Fayette Station take-out, and is also one of the most popular climbing areas on the East Coast. The New River itself originates in North Carolina, flowing north through Virginia into the West Virginia mountains to the Kanawha River which continues to the Ohio River.

== History ==
President Jimmy Carter signed legislation establishing New River Gorge National River on November 10, 1978 (Pub. L. 95–625). As stated in the legislation, the park was established as a unit of the national park system "for the purpose of conserving and interpreting outstanding natural, scenic, and historic values and objects in and around the New River Gorge, and preserving as a free-flowing stream an important segment of the New River in West Virginia for the benefit and enjoyment of present and future generations".

The New River Gorge National Park and Preserve Designation Act was incorporated into the Consolidated Appropriations Act, 2021, and signed into law by President Donald Trump on December 27, 2020, changing the designation to New River Gorge National Park and Preserve. Less than 10% of the original national river (7,021 acres (28.4 km^{2})) was redesignated as a national park, where hunting is no longer permitted, while the remainder (65,165 acres (263.71 km^{2})) is a national preserve with little change.

== Geologic features ==
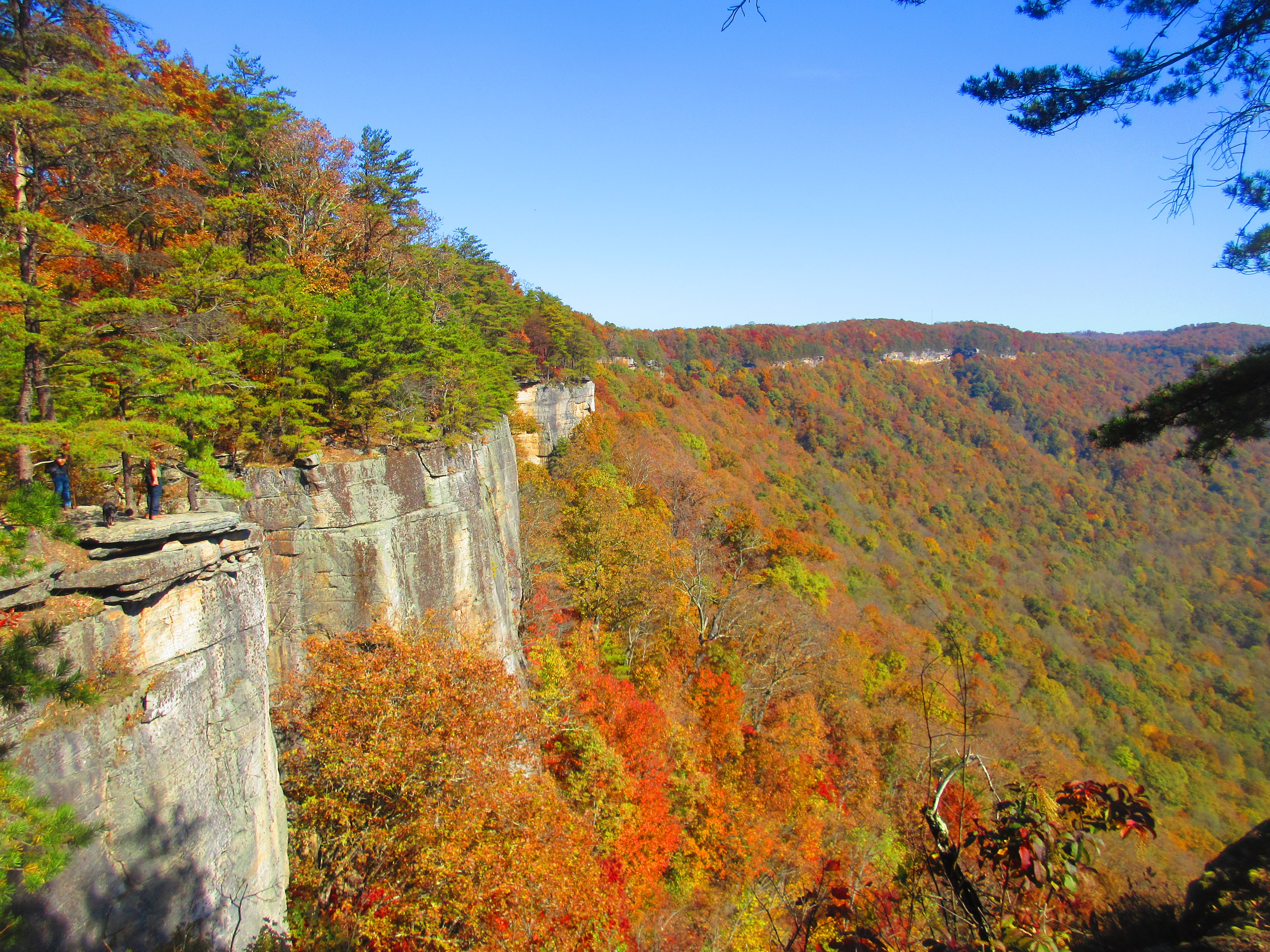
Endless Wall in the New River Gorge

Flowing water is the creative force shaping the geologic features of the New River Gorge, as the river continues to sculpt the longest and deepest river gorge in the Appalachian Mountains. On display in the gorge, a variety of unique geologic features and processes exemplify the geology of the Appalachian Plateau, including the exposure of over 1,000 feet (300 m) of sandstone and shale, house-sized boulders scattered from rim to river, plant and invertebrate fossils, and steep channel drop-offs. The river has exposed four seams of coal, considered among the best bituminous coal in the world. The smokeless New River coal once fed the boilers of the nation's trains, factories, fleets, and power plants, and its coke fueled the nation's iron furnaces.

== Aquatic life ==
The waters of the New River system contain a diverse selection of hydrologic features and aquatic habitats that support a unique aquatic ecosystem and nourish a riparian zone that supports rare plants, animals, and communities. The waters provide a variety and density of riverine hydrologic features and processes extremely uncommon in the Eastern United States, including pools, backwaters, glides, runs, shoals, riffles, torrents, cascades, chutes, rapids and waterfalls.

The river is a productive aquatic ecosystem that includes distinct populations of native fish (many found nowhere else), mussels, crayfish, and a broad array of other aquatic life, including rare amphibians, reptiles, birds, and mammals. The riparian zone is the most biologically diverse part of the park, and contains globally rare communities and essential habitat for several rare species. The New River is a dynamic aquatic ecosystem that supports smallmouth bass and other game fish, invertebrates, and aquatic plants.

== Diverse flora and fauna ==
New River Gorge National Park and Preserve lies at the core of a globally significant forest containing the most diverse flora of any river gorge in central and southern Appalachia; it provides essential habitat for endangered mammals and rare birds and amphibians. The park contains habitats of continuous forest, cliff and rimrock, forest seeps and wetlands, mature bottomland forests, abandoned mine portals (providing a refuge for rare species, including bats, amphibians, and the Allegheny woodrat, a species of special concern in West Virginia and in decline throughout the eastern United States). New River Gorge offers shelter to at least 63 species of mammals including the endangered Virginia big-eared and Indiana bats. The river, stream tributaries, and forest provide habitat for 48 known species of amphibians, including the endangered eastern hellbender, black-bellied salamander, and cave salamander.

Diverse populations of birds such as wood warblers, vireos, and thrushes spend part of their lives in the tropics, but depend upon the unfragmented forests of the New River Gorge for breeding. The region is a vital link in the north-south migratory flyway. Each year, thousands of hawks fly across the region during the fall migratory season. The National Park Service and West Virginia Department of Natural Resources have initiated a multiyear program to restore peregrine falcons to New River Gorge. They soar and dive near the cliffs.

Forty different plant communities containing at least 1,342 species and 54 rare plants have been identified in the gorge.

== Human settlements ==
There are historically significant abandoned places, some in ruins and some stabilized and rehabilitated, where people worked and lived during the late 18th and 19th centuries, supplying the coal from the New River Coalfield, and lumber that helped fuel American industry. Remnants of the park's past, hidden in the forest, tell the stories of earlier life in the Appalachian Mountains. On display are the tangible remains of historic coal mining structures and coke ovens — such as at Nuttallburg Coal Mining Complex and Town Historic District and Kay Moor — and the historic structures and ruins associated with more than 50 company-owned towns.

The New River Gorge region was opened up to the outside world in 1873 with the coming of the railroad. In the park, there are old railroad depots, rail yards, rail grades, steel and timber trestle bridges, railroad equipment, archeological sites and associated towns, like Thurmond, that were developed to support the railroad. The history and archeology associated with the lumbering industry can be seen in the ruins of old towns like Hamlet. Also contributing to the area's cultural history are surviving examples of subsistence farms, former community sites, homesteads, and other places in the park where the ancestors of families long associated with the New River lived and worked.

== Recreation ==
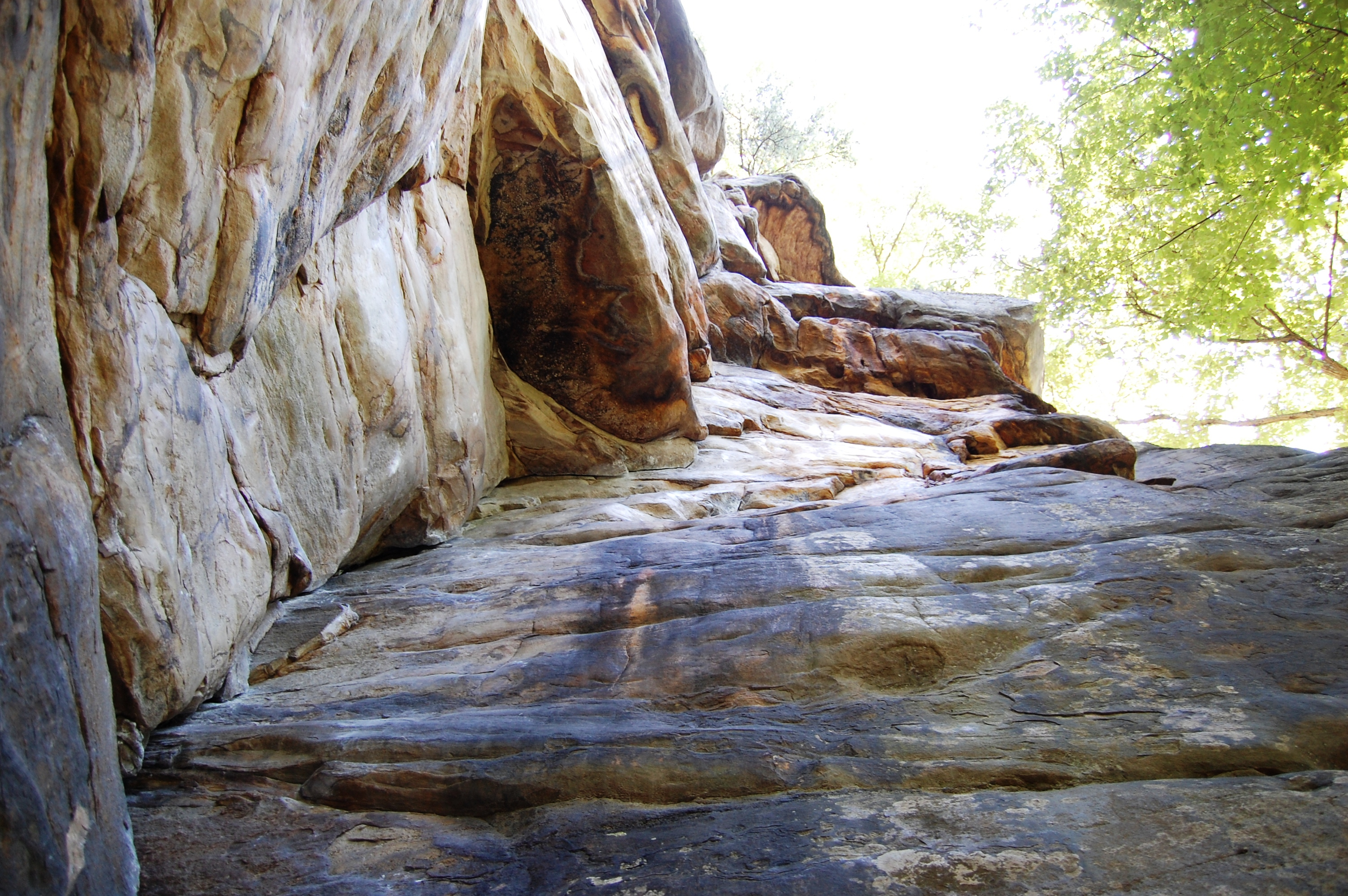
Classic climb, Four sheets to the wind (5.9) at Junkyard cliff in New River Gorge

The Lower Gorge of the New River is a premier whitewater rafting location. The rapids, ranging in difficulty from class III to class V, are imposing and forceful, many of them obstructed by large boulders, which necessitate maneuvering in very powerful currents, crosscurrents, and hydraulics. Commercial outfitters conduct trips down the river from April through October. The upper part of the river offers somewhat less challenging class I to III rapids for whitewater canoeing.

New River Gorge National Park and Preserve is one of the most popular rock-climbing areas in the country. Within the park are over 1,400 established rock climbs. The cliffs at "The New" located just below the rim of the gorge are made up of a very hard Nuttall sandstone. The rock is very featured, with an abundance of crack and face routes, and occasional large roofs. Almost all climbs are one pitch long and range from 30 to 120 feet (9.1 to 36.6 m) in height. The majority of the routes in the gorge are for advanced climbers in 5.10-5.12 range of the Yosemite decimal system with about an equal number of traditional and sport climbs.

Fishing is one of the most popular activities on the New River. The diversity of fish in its waters makes the New River an excellent warm-water fishery. All visitors fishing must have a West Virginia fishing license and follow state laws and regulations.

The over 50 miles (80 km) of hiking trails in the park range from easy walks to more challenging hikes. Several trails following old railroad grades are open to bikes. There are eight primitive camping areas within the park.

Two year-round visitor centers are located at Sandstone and Canyon Rim. The visitor centers at Grandview and Thurmond Depot operate seasonally.

The New River Gorge Bridge can be viewed throughout the park, including at the Canyon Rim Visitor Center and the Long Point trail. The bridge is a highway and closed to pedestrians, though the company Bridge Walk is allowed to lead guided tours on the maintenance catwalk below the bridge. Bridge Day, held on the third Saturday in October, is the only day of the year when the New River Gorge Bridge is closed to traffic and allows rappelling, ascending, and BASE jumping at the bridge.

== Gallery ==
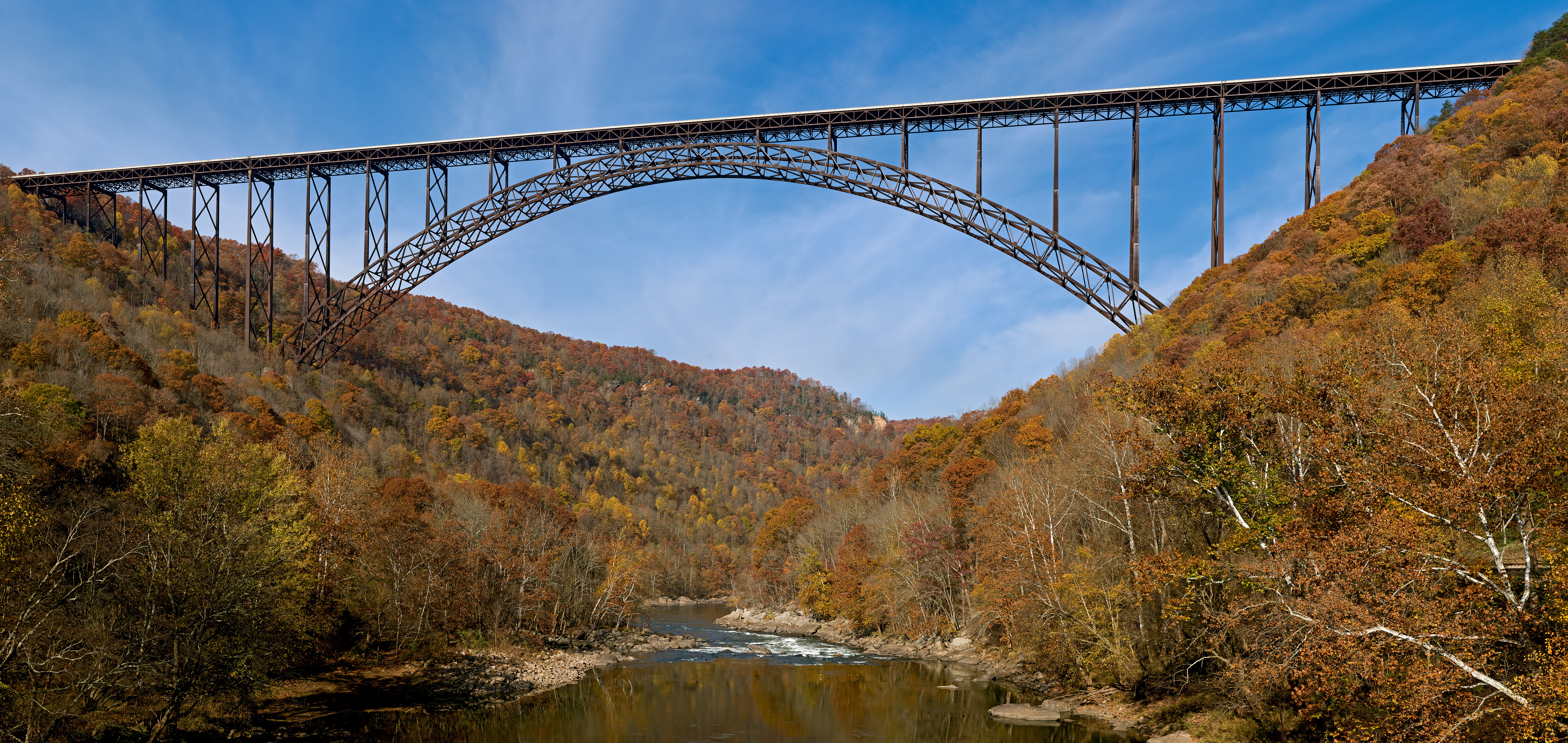
New River Gorge Bridge from Fayette Station Road

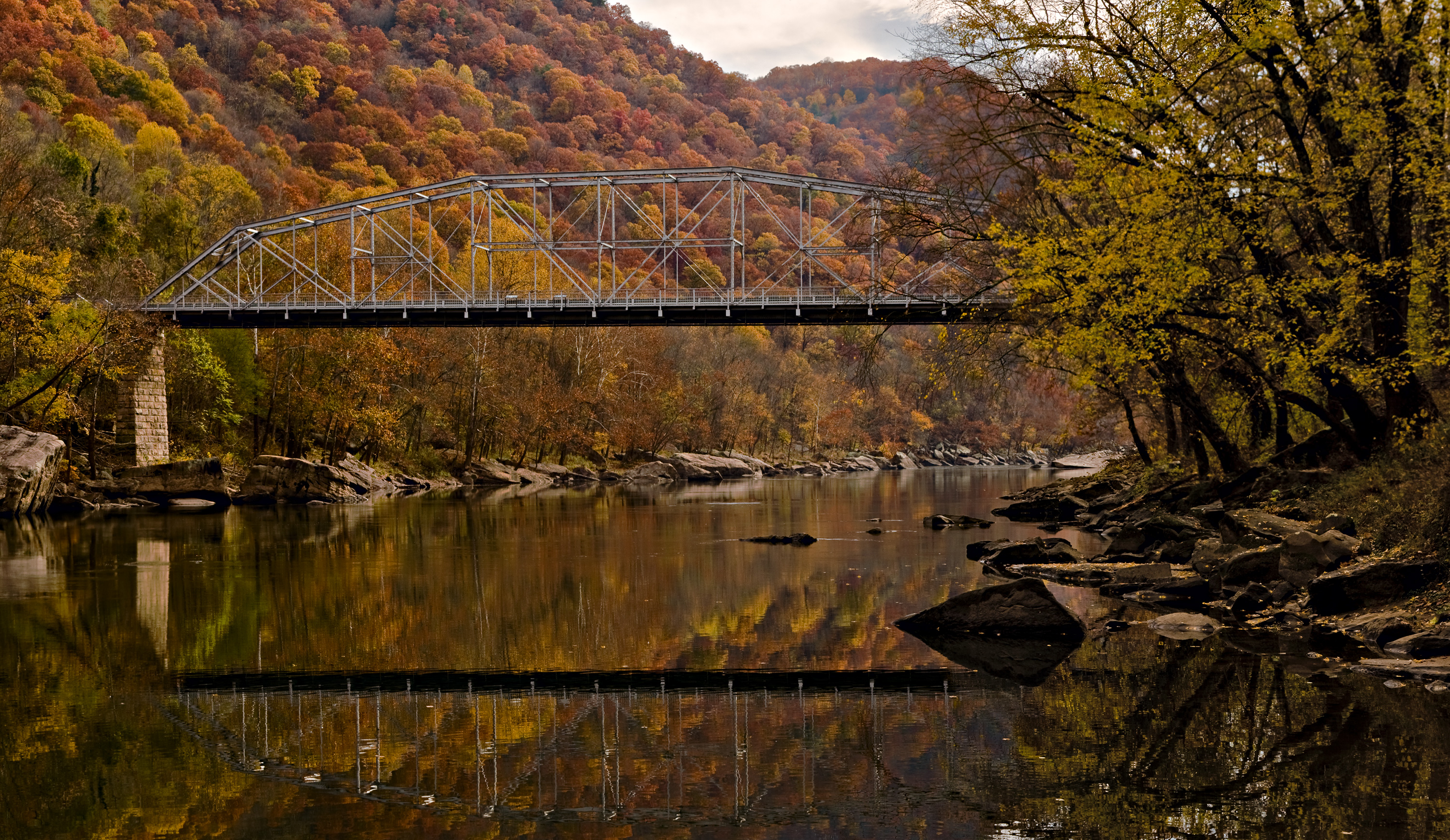
Reconstructed Fayette Station Bridge, representing the original bridge that spanned the river

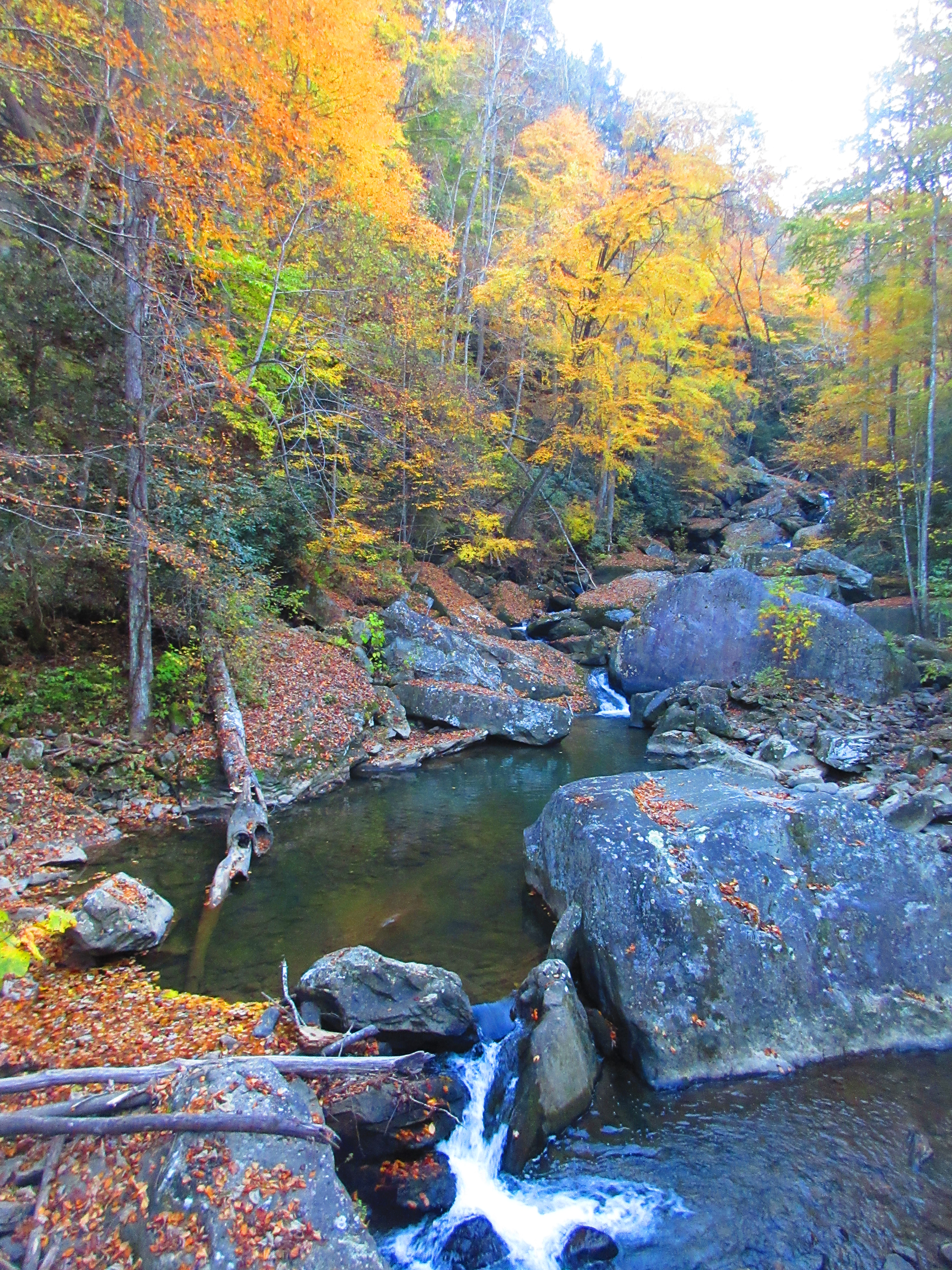
Henderson Falls along Fayette Station Road

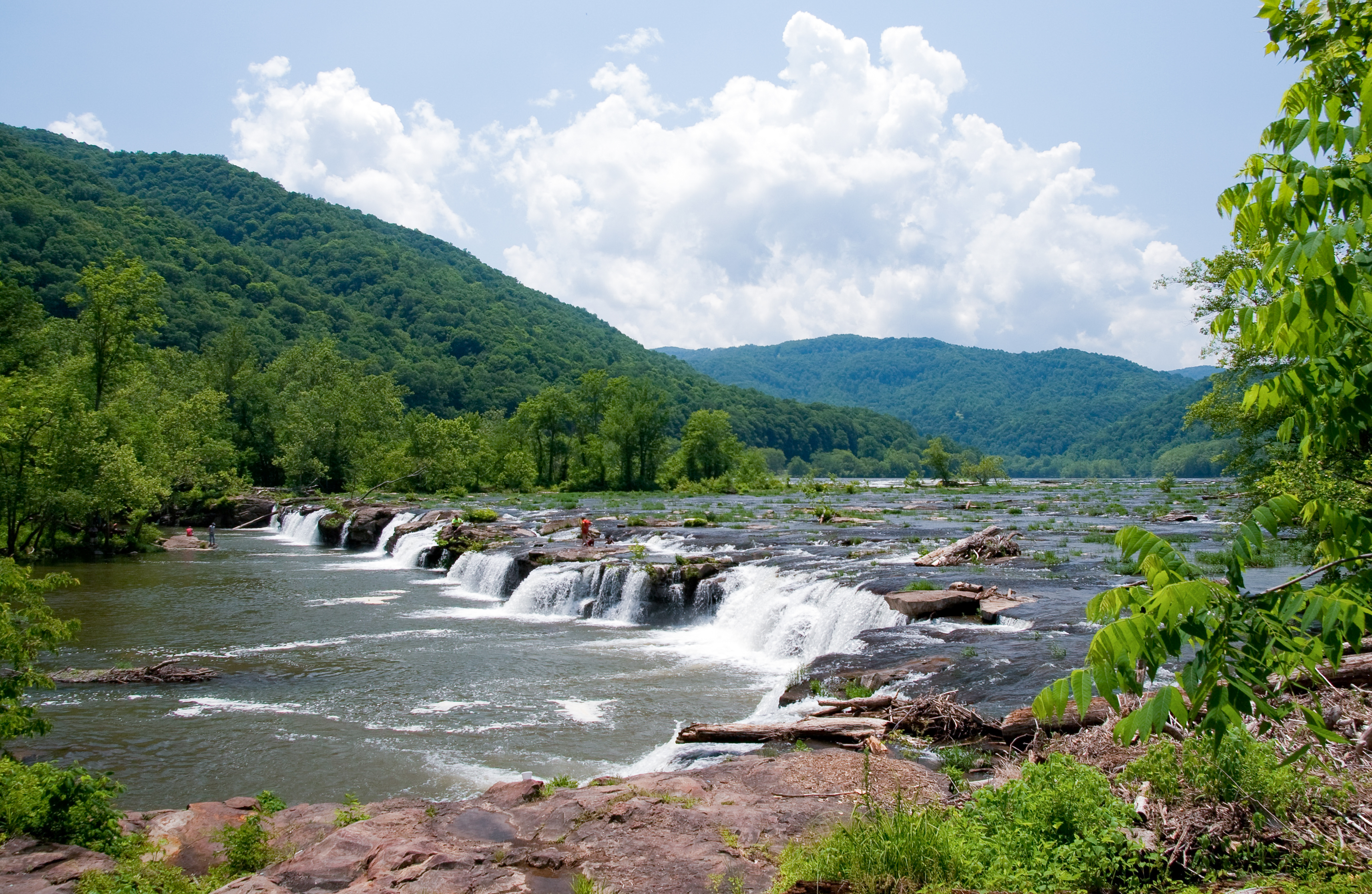
Sandstone Falls from the boardwalk

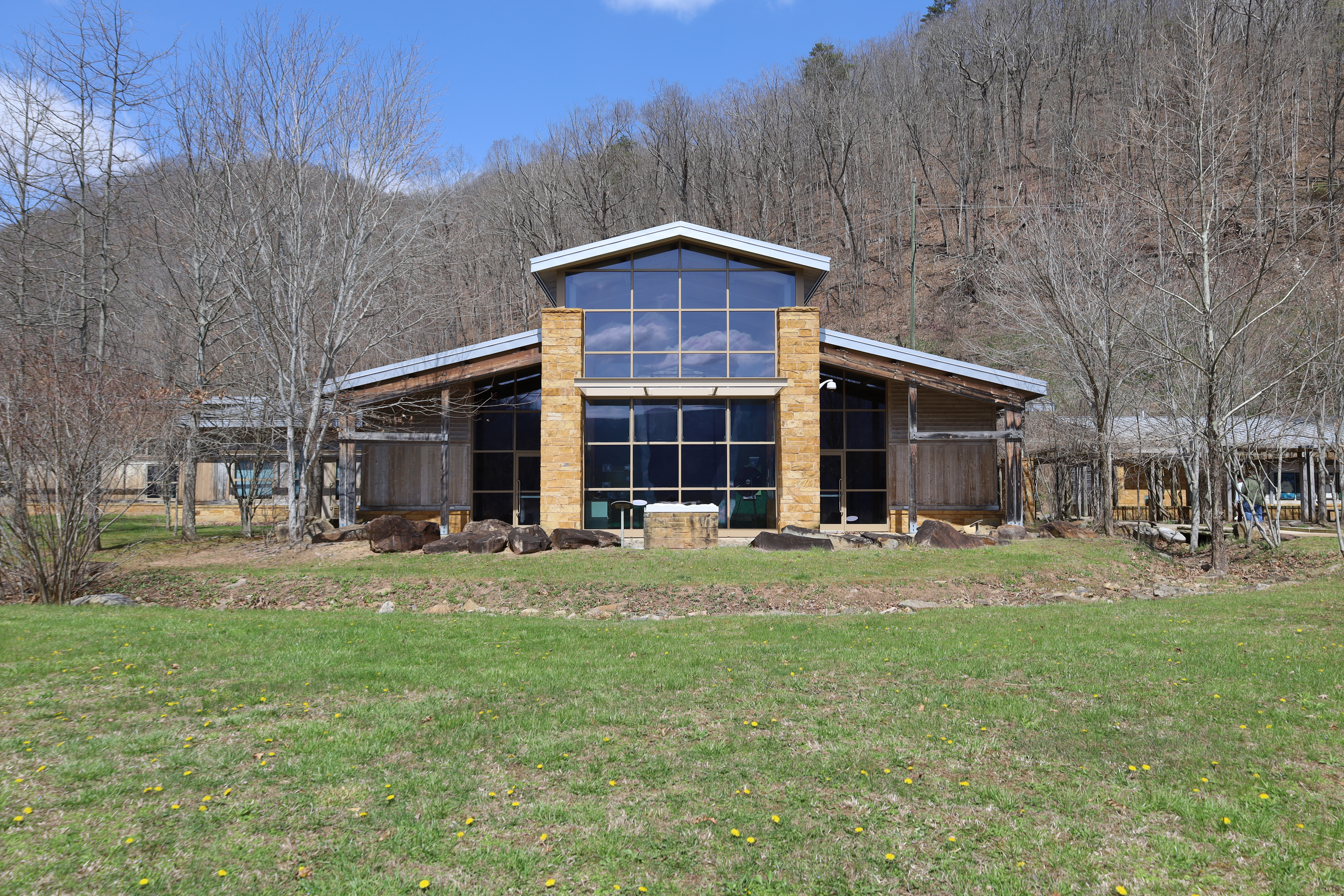
Sandstone Visitor Center near the south end of the park

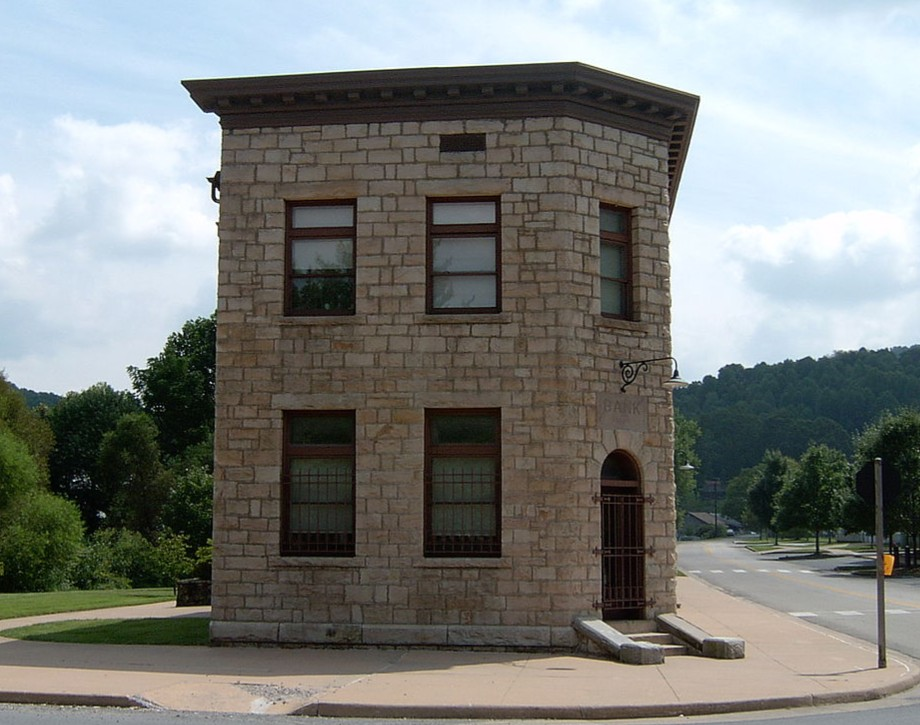
Historic Bank of Glen Jean near the park headquarters

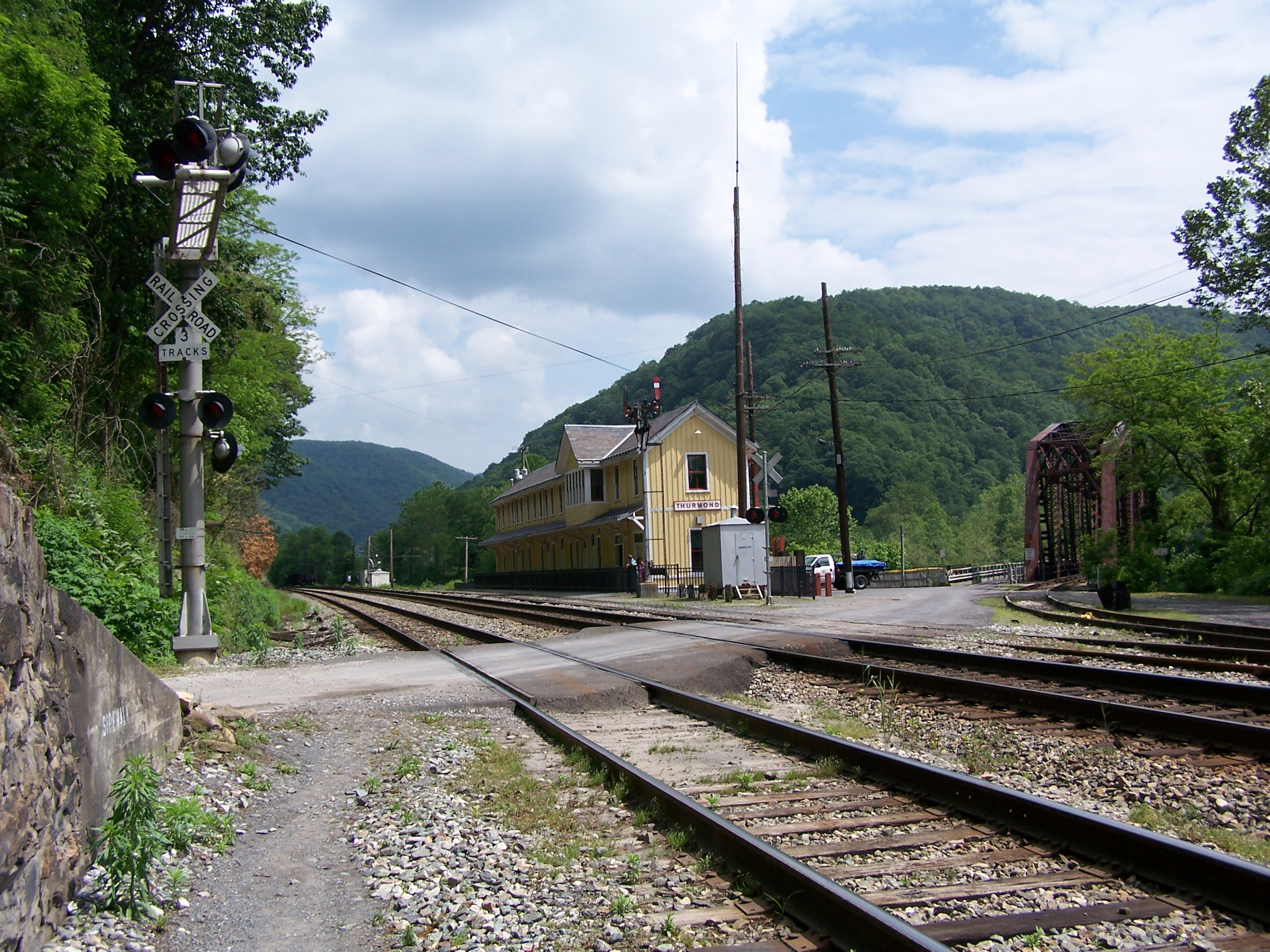
Thurmond Depot, now a seasonal visitor center

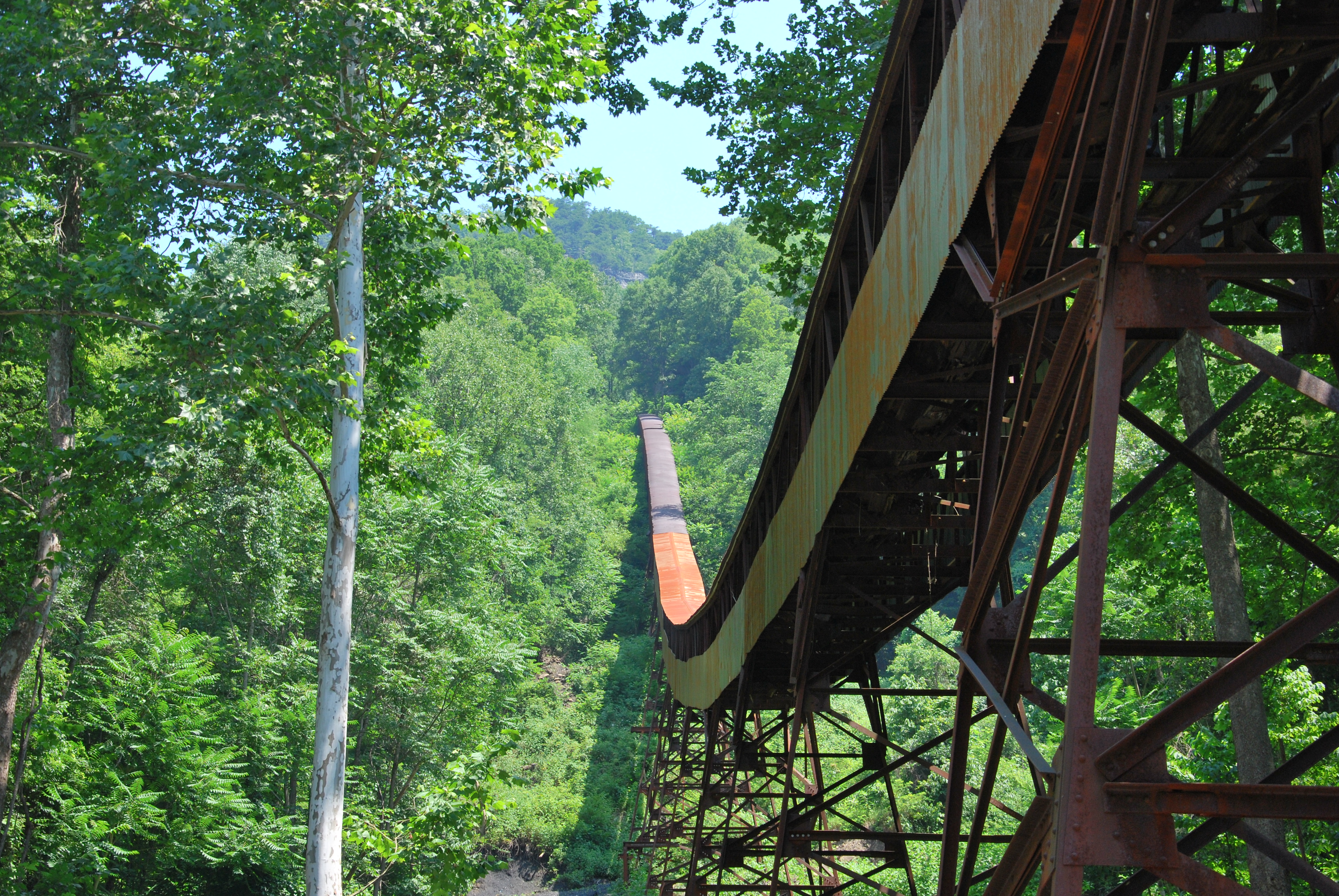
Nuttallburg coal conveyor

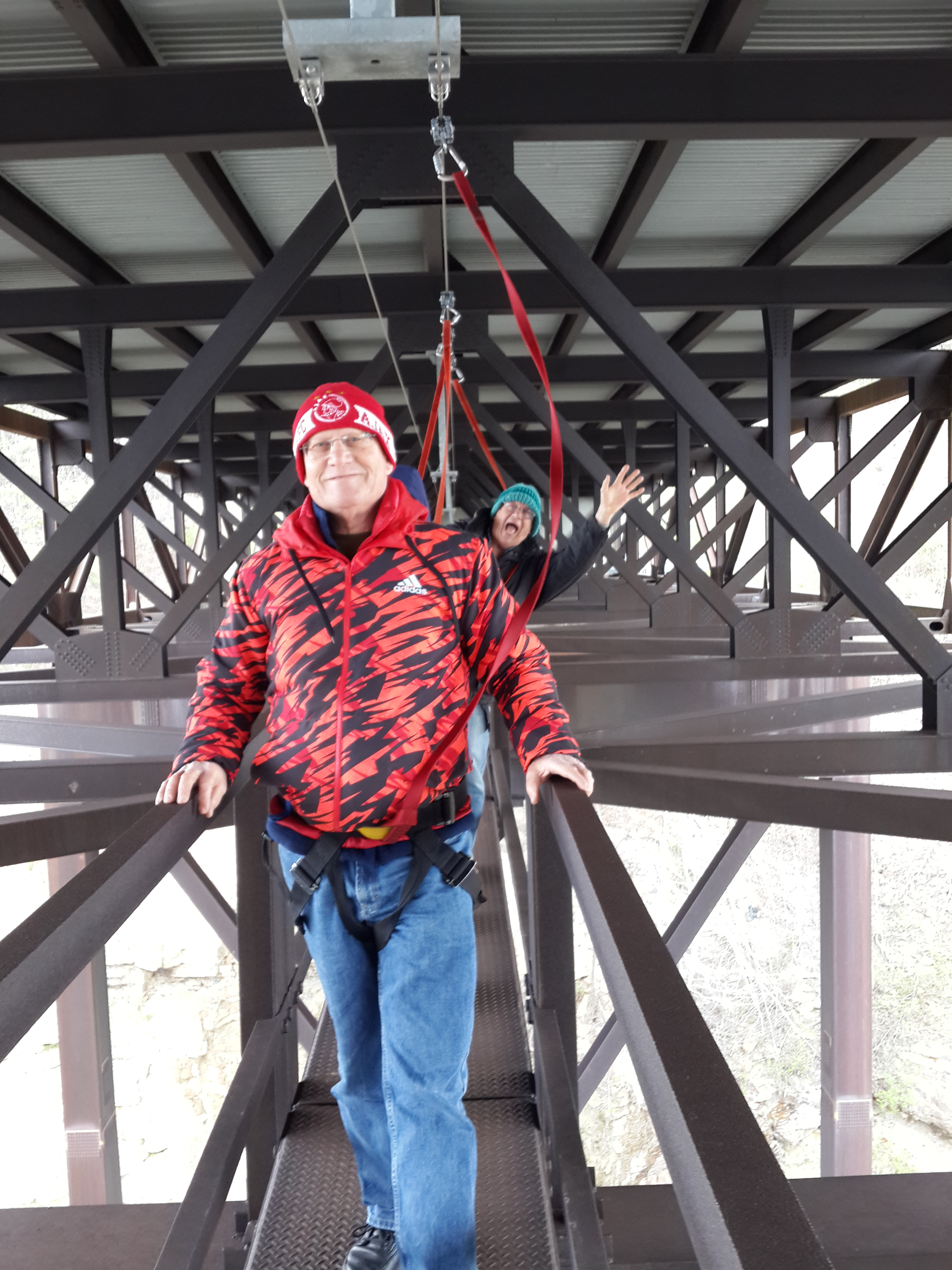
Tourists on the New River Gorge Bridge catwalk

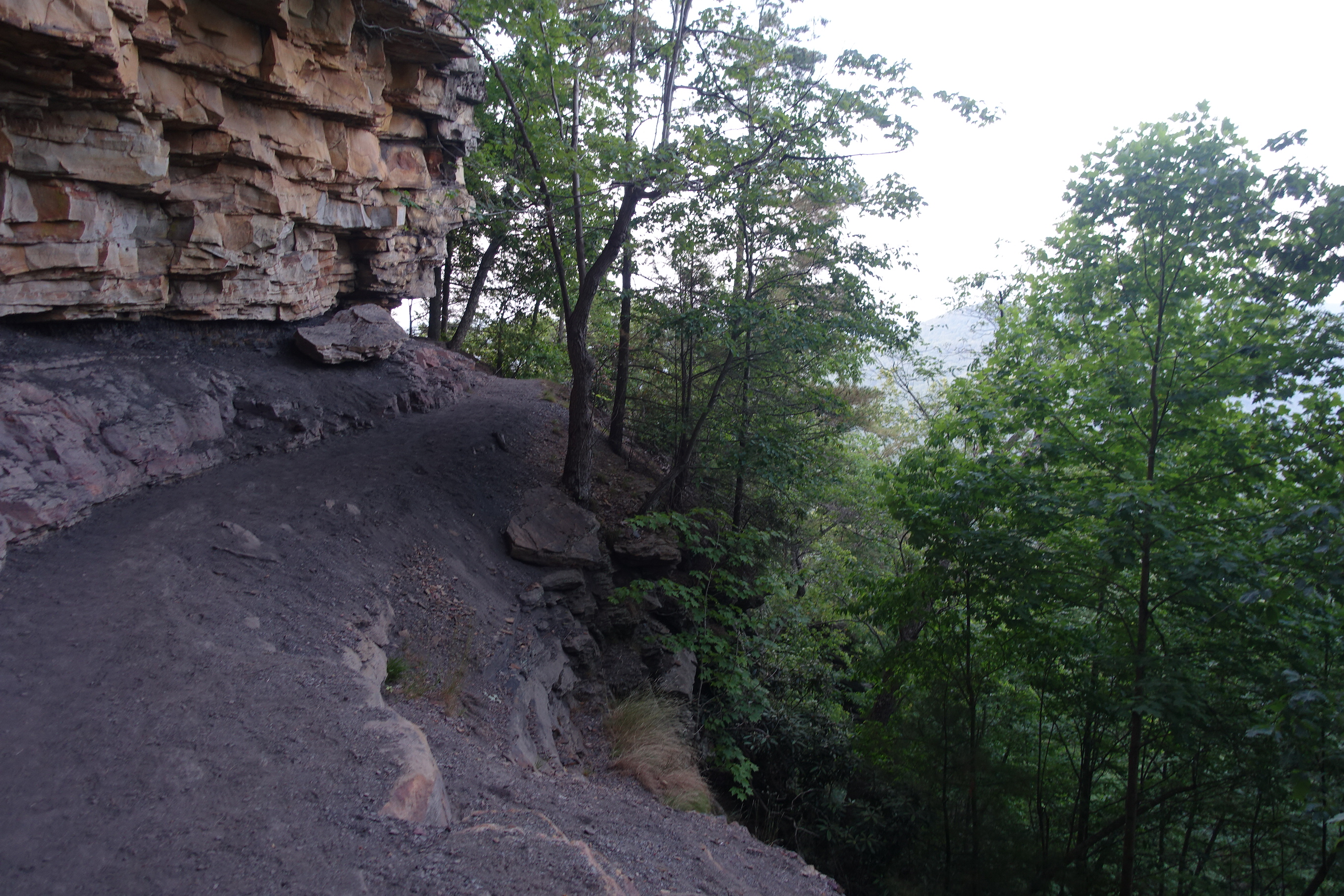
Castle Rock Trail at Grandview

== Major features ==
- Babcock State Park (adjoining West Virginia state park)
- Bank of Glen Jean
- Canyon Rim Visitor Center
- Fayette Station
- Grandview
- Hawks Nest State Park (adjoining West Virginia state park)
- Kaymoor
- Nuttallburg Coal Mining Complex and Town Historic District
- Prince
- Prince Brothers General Store-Berry Store
- Sandstone Falls
- Sandstone Visitor Center
- Stone Cliff
- Thurmond, West Virginia
- Thurmond Depot

== See also ==
- List of national parks of the United States
