= Whipple, West Virginia =

- Unincorporated community
- Location within West Virginia Location within the United States
- Coordinates: 37°57′42″N 81°09′57″W
- Country: United States
- State: West Virginia
- County: Fayette
- Elevation: 1,722 ft (525 m)
- Time zone: UTC-5 (Eastern (EST))
  - Summer (DST): UTC-4 (EDT)
- Area codes: 304 & 681
- GNIS feature ID: 1555964

Whipple is an unincorporated community in Fayette County, West Virginia, United States. Whipple is located on West Virginia Route 612, 1.5 miles (2.4 km) southwest of Oak Hill.

== Notable people ==
- George Cafego, football player
- Tom Cafego, baseball player
- Charlie Shields, baseball player
