= Gauley Bridge station =

- Gauley Bridge Railroad Station
- U.S. National Register of Historic Places
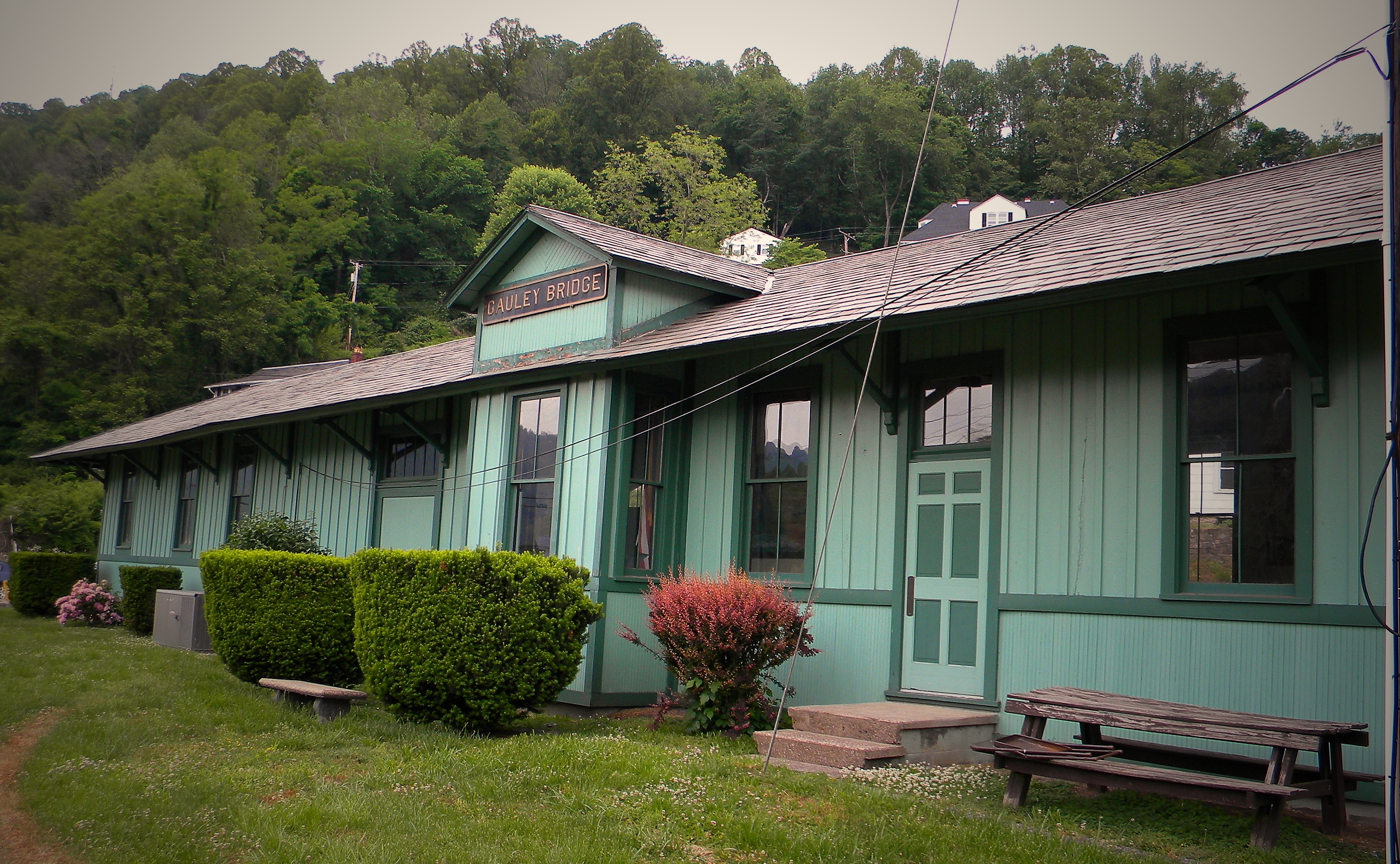
- Gauley Bridge Railroad Station

- Location within West Virginia Location within the United States
- Location: Off WV 16/39, Gauley Bridge, West Virginia
- Coordinates: 38°9′53″N 81°11′46″W
- Area: 1.5 acres (0.61 ha)
- Built: 1893
- Architect: Kanawha and Michigan Railroad Co.
- NRHP reference No.: 80004018
- Added to NRHP: May 15, 1980

Gauley Bridge Railroad Station is a historic railroad station in Gauley Bridge, West Virginia. The station was constructed on a Kanawha and Michigan Railroad line in 1893 and later became a Chesapeake and Ohio Railway station. It closed to trains in 1958 and became a fire station for the Gauley Bridge Volunteer Fire Department until it closed permanently in 1973. The station is reflective of company-built small-town railroad stations of its era. It was added to the National Register of Historic Places on May 15, 1980.

Preceding station	Chesapeake and Ohio Railway	Following station
Deepwater toward Cincinnati	Main Line	Hawks Nest toward Washington, D.C. or Phoebus
