= E. B. Hawkins House =

Historic house in West Virginia, United States

- U.S. National Register of Historic Places
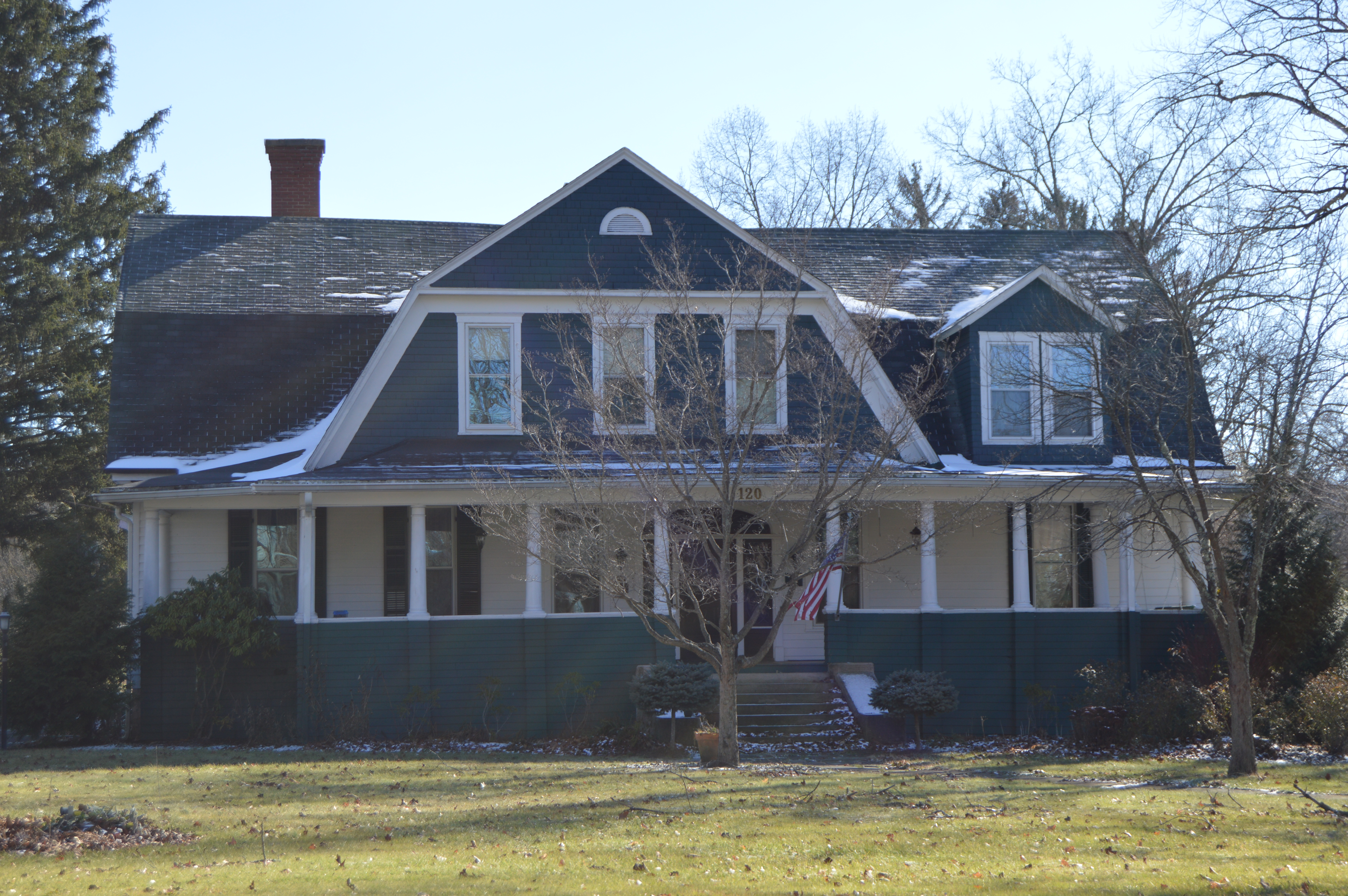
- Front of the house

- Location within West Virginia Location within the United States
- Location: 120 Fayette Ave., Fayetteville, West Virginia
- Coordinates: 38°3′8″N 81°5′56″W
- Area: 24 acres (9.7 ha)
- Built: 1905-1906
- Architectural style: Colonial Revival
- NRHP reference No.: 89002319
- Added to NRHP: January 18, 1990

E. B. Hawkins House, also known as the Hawkins-Ballard House, is a historic mansion located at Fayetteville, Fayette County, West Virginia. It was built in 1905–1906, and is a 12,000-square-foot (1,100 m^{2}) clapboard and shingle-sided dwelling in a modified Colonial Revival style. It features gambrel roofs and rambling porches. Also on the property are a guest house (c. 1918), garage (c. 1910), barn (c. 1905–1906), and frame cottage (c. 1918). It is now known as the Historic White Horse Bed and Breakfast.

It was listed on the National Register of Historic Places in 1990.
