= Altamont Hotel =

- U.S. National Register of Historic Places
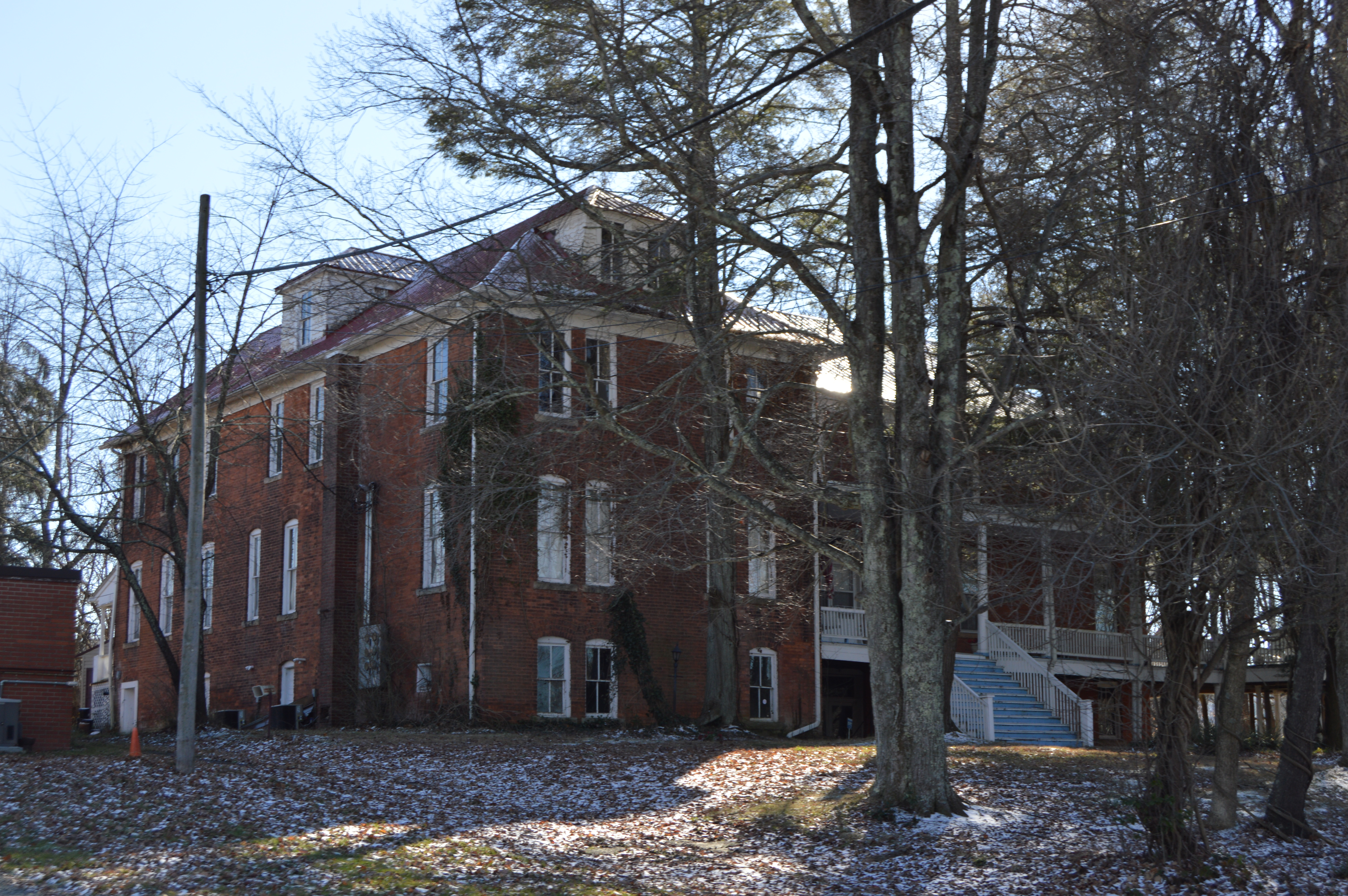
- Front and northeastern side

- Location within West Virginia Location within the United States
- Location: 110 Fayette Ave., Fayetteville, West Virginia
- Coordinates: 38°3′9″N 81°6′6″W
- Area: 1.3 acres (0.53 ha)
- Built: 1897
- Architect: Dickinson, Robert H.
- NRHP reference No.: 79002574
- Added to NRHP: August 29, 1979

Altamont Hotel is a historic hotel located at Fayetteville, Fayette County, West Virginia. It was built in 1897–1898, and is a 2 1/2-story, T-shaped brick building on a raised basement. It features a gently sloping hipped roof and wraparound Victorian verandah. In the 1930s, it was adapted for apartment use.

It was listed on the National Register of Historic Places in 1979.
