= Scarbro, West Virginia =

- Census-designated place (CDP)
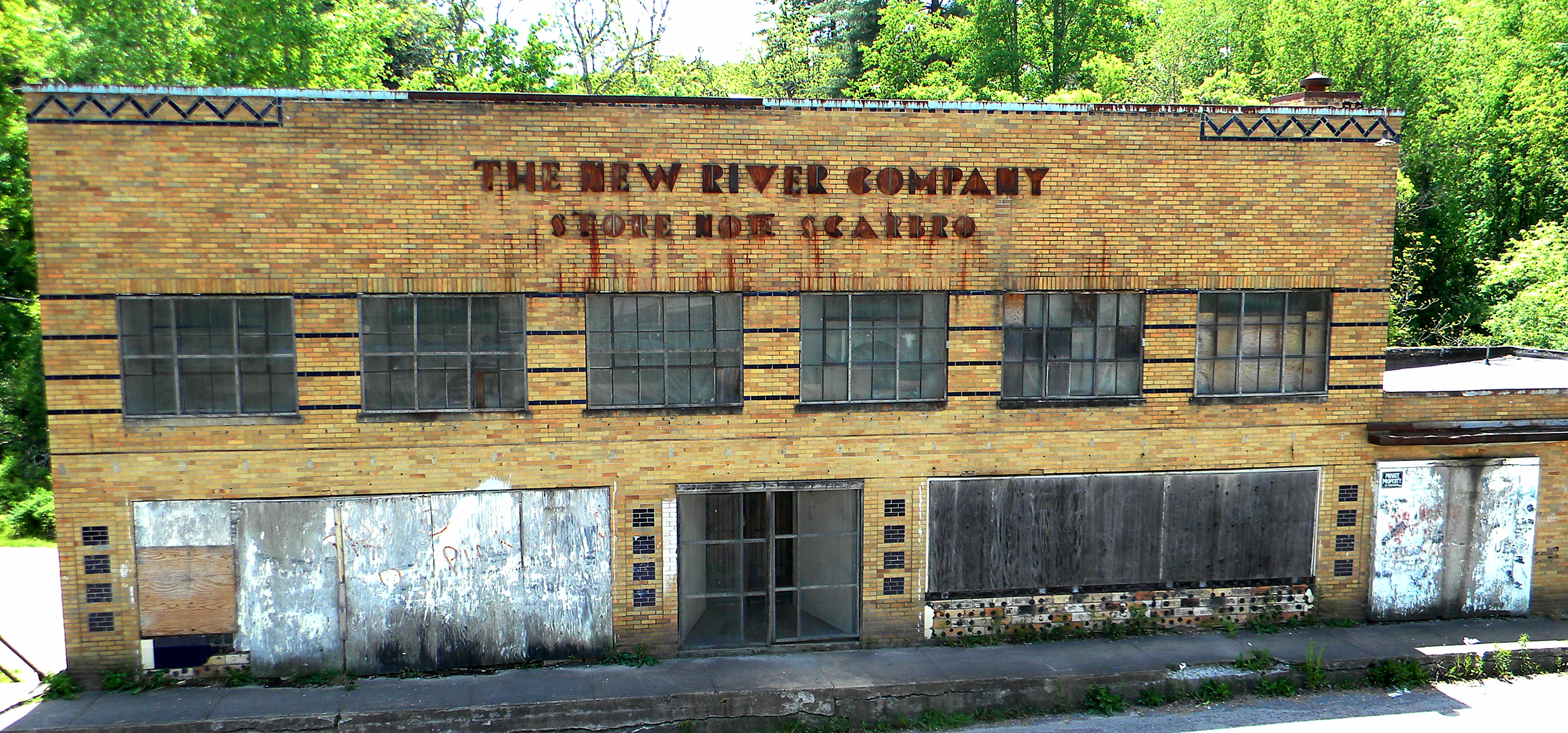
- Former company store at Scarbro West Virginia

- Location within West Virginia Location within the United States
- Coordinates: 37°57′11″N 81°09′56″W
- Country: United States
- State: West Virginia
- County: Fayette
- Incorporated: 1901

Area
  - Total: 0.681 sq mi (1.76 km^{2})
  - Land: 0.680 sq mi (1.76 km^{2})
  - Water: 0.001 sq mi (0.0026 km^{2})
- Elevation: 1,736 ft (529 m)

Population (2020)
  - Total: 461
  - Density: 678/sq mi (262/km^{2})
- Time zone: UTC-5 (Eastern (EST))
  - Summer (DST): UTC-4 (EDT)
- ZIP code: 25917
- Area codes: 304 & 681
- GNIS feature ID: 1555579

Scarbro is a census-designated place (CDP) and coal town in Fayette County, West Virginia, United States. Scarbro is 1.5 miles (2.4 km) southwest of Oak Hill. Scarbro has a post office with ZIP code 25917. As of the 2020 census, its population was 461 (down from 486 at the 2010 census).

== History ==
The community was named for the fact a large share of the first settlers were named Scarbrough, which was said to recall the English town-name of Scarborough in Yorkshire. Scarbro was incorporated in 1901.
