= Fayette County Courthouse (West Virginia) =

- U.S. National Register of Historic Places
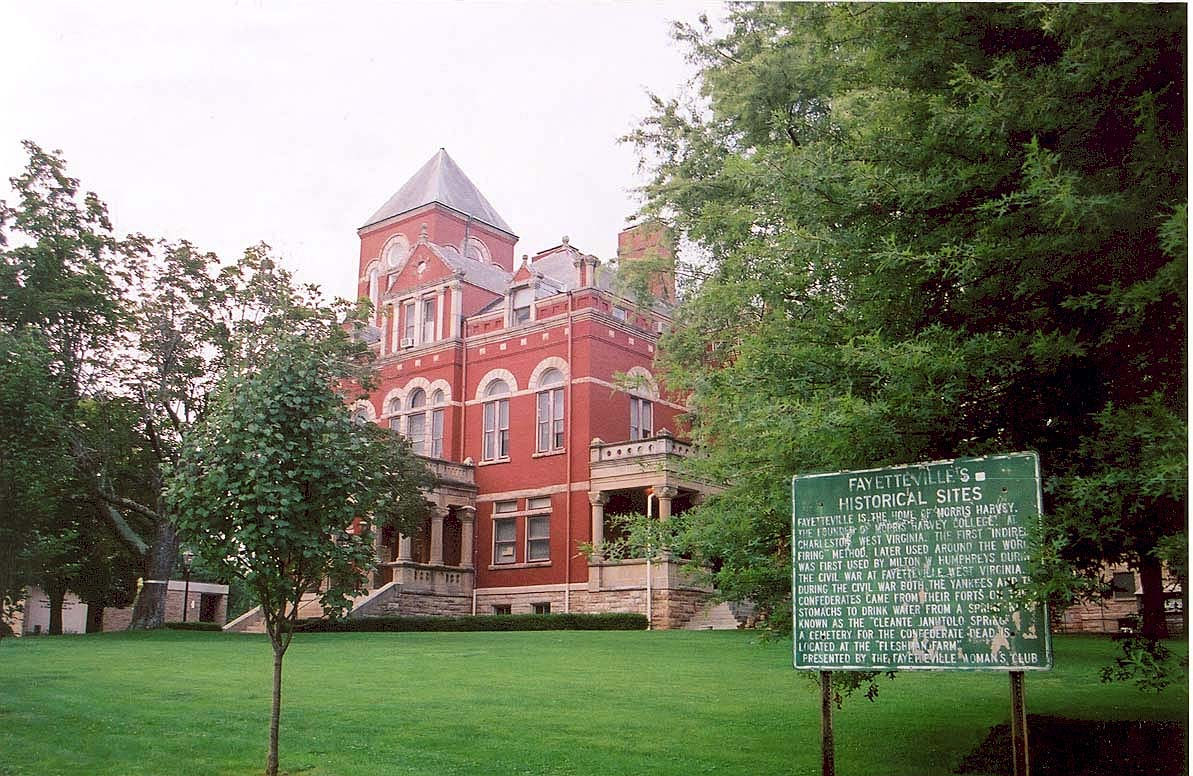

- Location within West Virginia Location within the United States
- Interactive map showing the location of Fayette County Courthouse
- Location: Court St. between Wiseman and Maple Aves., Fayetteville, West Virginia
- Coordinates: 38°3′13″N 81°6′13″W
- Area: 2 acres (0.81 ha)
- Built: 1894
- Architect: Franzheim, Edward Bates; Giesey, Millard F.
- Architectural style: Romanesque
- NRHP reference No.: 78002793
- Added to NRHP: September 6, 1978

Fayette County Courthouse is a historic courthouse located at Fayetteville, Fayette County, West Virginia. It was built in 1894–1895, and is a 2 1/2 story, five bay wide, rectangular building with projecting wings. The basement level is built of sandstone and faced in ashlar. Above that, the walls are of brick. It features a square tower with pyramidal roof.

It was listed on the National Register of Historic Places in 1978.
