= Fayetteville, West Virginia =

- Town
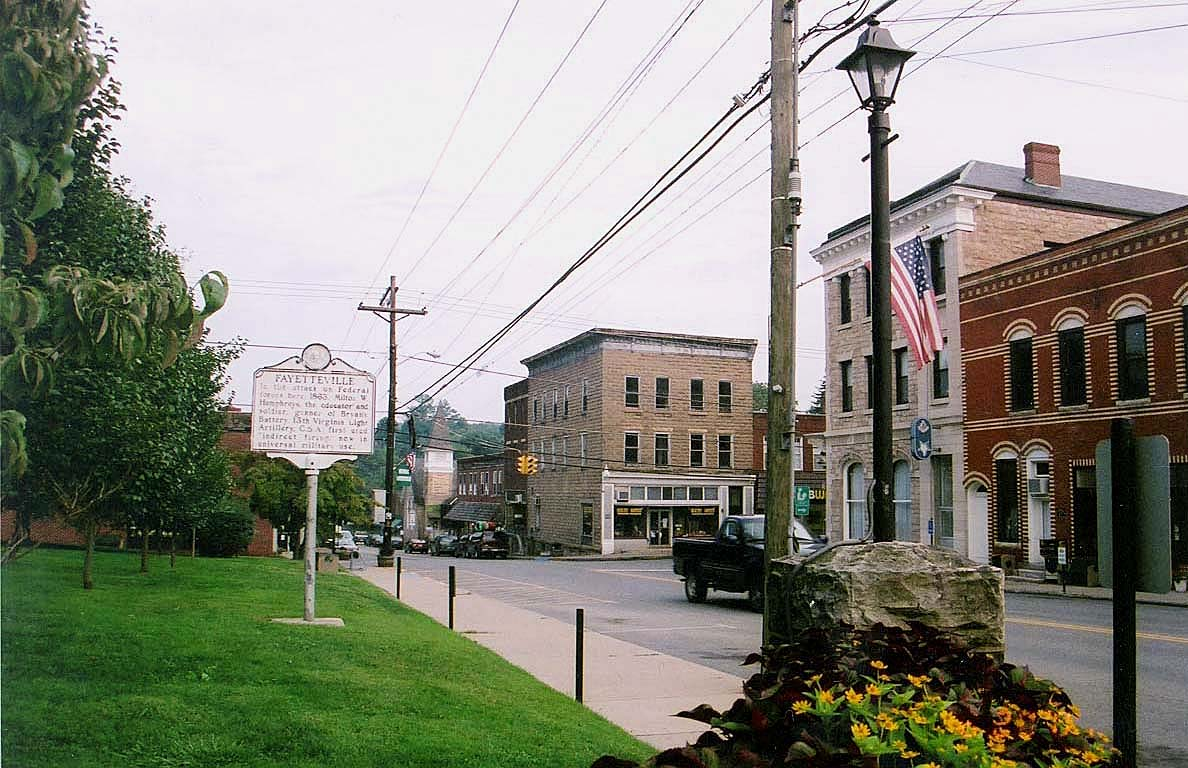
- Court Street in downtown Fayetteville

- Flag Seal Logo
- Interactive map of Fayetteville, West Virginia
- Location within West Virginia Location within the United States
- Coordinates: 38°3′4″N 81°6′25″W
- Country: United States
- State: West Virginia
- County: Fayette
- Settled: 1883

Area
  - Total: 5.58 sq mi (14.46 km^{2})
  - Land: 5.57 sq mi (14.43 km^{2})
  - Water: 0.012 sq mi (0.03 km^{2})
- Elevation: 1,818 ft (554 m)

Population (2020)
  - Total: 2,887
  - Density: 518.2/sq mi (200.1/km^{2})
- Time zone: UTC-5 (Eastern (EST))
  - Summer (DST): UTC-4 (EDT)
- ZIP code: 25840
- Area code: 304
- FIPS code: 54-27028
- GNIS feature ID: 1538910
- Website: Official website

Fayetteville is a town in and the county seat of Fayette County, West Virginia, United States. The population was 2,887 at the 2020 census.

Fayetteville lies adjacent to the New River Gorge National Park and Preserve and is directly south of the New River Gorge Bridge. Fayetteville was listed as one of the 2006 "Top 10 Coolest Small Towns in America" by Budget Travel Magazine, and as "Best River Town 2013" by Blue Ridge Outdoors magazine.

== History ==
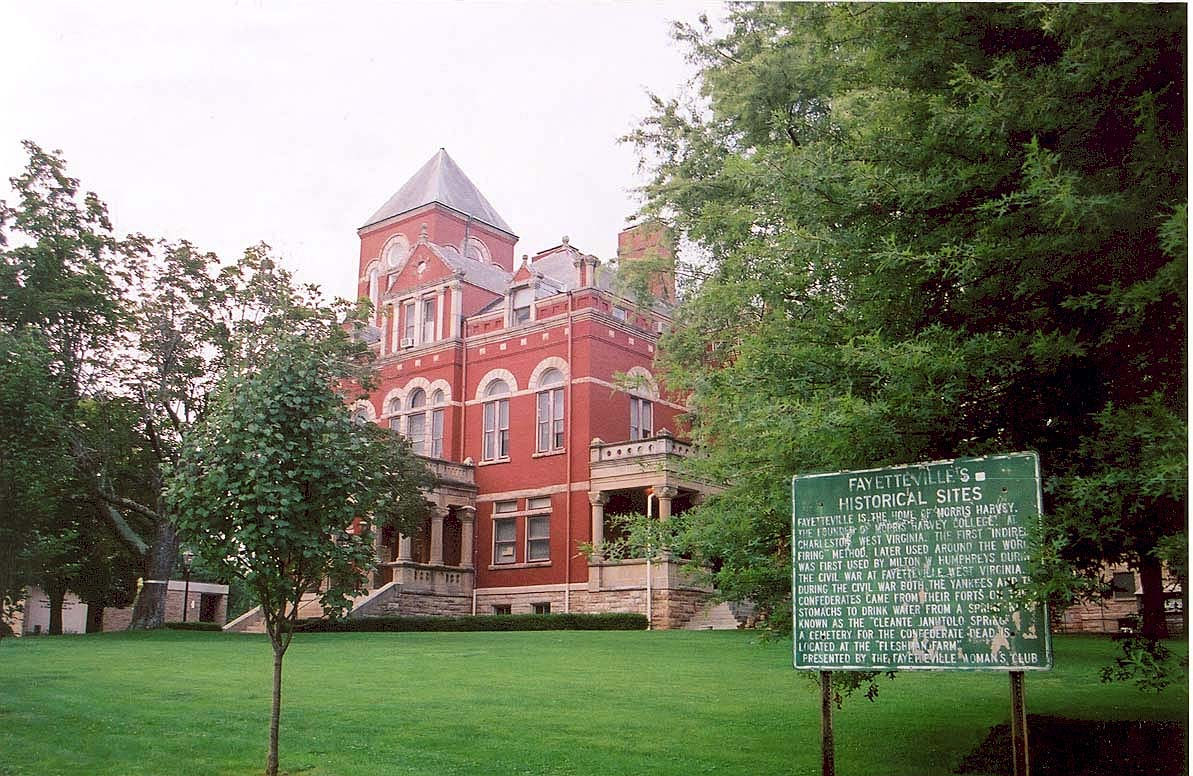
Fayette County Courthouse

Fayetteville was founded as Vandalia by Abraham Vandall, a Revolutionary War veteran and local farmer, on farmland that Vandall owned. In 1837, the county seat of government was moved from New Haven in the Mountain Cove District to Vandalia. Later, the town's name was changed to Fayetteville after the Revolutionary War hero, Marquis de Lafayette who toured the US in 1824–25.

During the Civil War, the majority of the people in Fayetteville were in sympathy with the Confederacy. With neighboring counties being predominantly Unionist, however, Fayetteville changed hands several times during the war and was partially destroyed during the fighting. (See Battle of Fayetteville)

In 1897, the Fayette County Courthouse was completed on part of the original Vandall farm and was a remarkable example of the Romanesque Revival architectural style. The Altamont Hotel was built the same year. Both are listed on the National Register of Historic Places, along with the E. B. Hawkins House. The Fayetteville Historic District was designated in 1990.

Fayetteville grew rapidly in the late 19th century thanks mainly to the coal industry. The mining industry declined in the late 20th century. Fayetteville's economy now is almost completely based on the tourism industry. Popular activities include white water rafting, fishing, mountain biking, and rock climbing in the region. Also, the New River Gorge Bridge hosts the annual celebration, "Bridge Day," which is held on the third Saturday of October.

The New River Gorge Bridge is the longest arch bridge in the western hemisphere; its creation made traveling on US 19 much easier, turning a 45-minute sojourn from one side of the gorge to the other into a roughly 45-second jaunt. The New River is one of the five oldest major rivers in the world.

== Geography ==
Fayetteville is located at 38°3′4″N 81°6′25″W (38.051181, -81.106961).

According to the United States Census Bureau, the town has a total area of 5.47 square miles (14.17 km^{2}), of which 5.46 square miles (14.14 km^{2}) is land and 0.01 square miles (0.03 km^{2}) is water.

Located less than a mile away from Fayetteville is the New River Gorge, which attracts outdoor recreation enthusiasts. The scenic cliffs that line the New River Gorge are popular for rock climbing. The New River offers Class I-IV whitewater rafting and kayaking. Hiking and biking trails in the area are also available. The New River Gorge National Park and Preserve, managed by the U.S. National Park Service, operates a visitors center and offers many educational programs in the area.

== Demographics ==
Historical population
Census	Pop.	Note	%±
1900	413		—
1910	671		62.5%
1920	659		−1.8%
1930	1,143		73.4%
1940	1,347		17.8%
1950	1,952		44.9%
1960	1,848		−5.3%
1970	1,712		−7.4%
1980	2,366		38.2%
1990	2,182		−7.8%
2000	2,754		26.2%
2010	2,892		5.0%
2020	2,887		−0.2%
U.S. Decennial Census

=== 2010 census ===
At the 2010 census there were 2,892 people, 1,245 households, and 813 families living in the town. The population density was 529.7 inhabitants per square mile (204.5/km^{2}). There were 1,366 housing units at an average density of 250.2 per square mile (96.6/km^{2}). The racial makeup of the town was 95.8% White, 3.0% African American, 0.2% Native American, 0.2% Asian, 0.1% from other races, and 0.7% from two or more races. Hispanic or Latino of any race were 1.6%.

Of the 1,245 households 26.7% had children under the age of 18 living with them, 49.0% were married couples living together, 12.5% had a female householder with no husband present, 3.8% had a male householder with no wife present, and 34.7% were non-families. 29.2% of households were one person and 13.1% were one person aged 65 or older. The average household size was 2.29 and the average family size was 2.79.

The median age in the town was 44.4 years. 19.7% of residents were under the age of 18; 6.6% were between the ages of 18 and 24; 24.3% were from 25 to 44; 30.9% were from 45 to 64; and 18.5% were 65 or older. The gender makeup of the town was 48.3% male and 51.7% female.

=== 2000 census ===
At the 2000 census there were 2,754 people, 1,151 households, and 766 families living in the town. The population density was 934.8 people per square mile (360.4/km^{2}). There were 1,257 housing units at an average density of 426.7 per square mile (164.5/km^{2}). The racial makeup of the town was 94.88% White, 4.58% African American, 0.15% Native American, 0.04% Asian, 0.04% Pacific Islander, 0.18% from other races, and 0.15% from two or more races. Hispanic or Latino of any race were 0.62%.

Of the 1,151 households 27.9% had children under the age of 18 living with them, 53.2% were married couples living together, 10.7% had a female householder with no husband present, and 33.4% were non-families. 29.5% of households were one person and 16.2% were one person aged 65 or older. The average household size was 2.29 and the average family size was 2.82.

The age distribution was 20.4% under the age of 18, 7.1% from 18 to 24, 26.1% from 25 to 44, 26.4% from 45 to 64, and 20.0% 65 or older. The median age was 43 years. For every 100 females, there were 84.5 males. For every 100 females age 18 and over, there were 79.3 males.

The median household income was $35,043 and the median family income was $44,444. Males had a median income of $35,603 versus $20,909 for females. The per capita income for the town was $18,710. About 9.5% of families and 11.7% of the population were below the poverty line, including 13.7% of those under age 18 and 16.1% of those age 65 or over.

== Notable people ==
- Tunney Hunsaker - Professional boxer and longtime Fayetteville police chief
- The five Sodder children – Pronounced dead after a fire destroyed the family home on Christmas Eve 1945, their parents and all but one surviving sibling came to believe they had instead disappeared. They erected a billboard on the outskirts of town to publicize the reward they offered for information that would resolve the case.
