= Mount Hope High School (West Virginia) =

Former high school in the U.S. state of West Virginia

Location
- 110 High School Drive; Mount Hope, Fayette, West Virginia 25880; United States; 37°53′50.3″N 81°09′29.8″W

Information
- Established: 1911
- Closed: 2011
- School district: Fayette County Schools
- Grades: 5–12
- Language: English
- Mascot: Yellow Jackets (until 1930); Mustangs (1930-2011)
- Newspaper: The Reflector
- Yearbook: Mons Spei

Mount Hope High School was a public secondary school in Mount Hope, West Virginia. Established in 1911, it served the community for a century before its closure in 2011. Over its history, the school experienced significant changes, such as relocating, expanding academic and extracurricular programs, and integration with DuBois High School following the Brown v. Board of Education decision. The school closed in the 2010–2011 academic year due to declining enrollment and state-mandated education restructuring, and its original building has since been repurposed for community use.

== History ==
The first permanent school in Mount Hope operated from a log cabin, which burned down in March 1910. Mount Hope High School was founded and built in 1911, graduating its first class of four students in 1912. The school's yearbook, Mons Spei, was first published in 1919 as the school's first official record of student activities. Early student organizations included the Excelsior Society, Peerless Literary Society, Hi-Y (organized in 1921), the Alpha Omega (A-Z) club for girls in 1922, and, later, Alpha Beta. The female students organized the Alpha Omega or A-Z club, for "clean speech, clean living, and clean thoughts." By 1924, the school prioritized foreign languages, establishing both a Latin Club (later called Inter Nos) and then, a few years later, the French Club (Le Cercle Français)

In 1925, the high school moved to a new facility at 510 Main Street, while the original building became Mount Hope Junior High School. The Dramatic Club staged the first class play in 1925. Boys' and girls' glee clubs were added by 1926, and these groups performed an operetta in 1929. By 1939, additional clubs were formed for puzzles, birds, and aeronautics, in addition to other short-lived clubs.

After the 1954 Brown v. Board of Education decision, Fayette County Schools officials announced the integration of county public schools for the 1956–1957 school year. In fall 1956, the all-white Mount Hope High School and the all-black DuBois High School merged, moving into the newer DuBois High School building, while the former Mount Hope High School building became the junior high. The DuBois High School building had opened on January 30, 1954, after its previous facility burned in 1950. By 1961, Mount Hope High School was accredited by the North Central Association of Colleges and Schools, and consisted of departments in business education with courses in law, math, English, shorthand, bookkeeping, and typing; home economics; vocational skills in woodworking; and psychology. In May 1961, Mount Hope High School marked the graduation of the school's 50th class.

In 2009, Fayette County voters rejected a bond measure for building a school consolidating the county's four high schools into one. The West Virginia Board of Education assumed control of Fayette County Schools in 2010. After the takeover, auditors cited Mount Hope High School's weak curriculum and low math scores, as well as its failure to meet state standards for attendance and land area, as reasons for closure. On January 12, 2011, the state board approved the Fayette County Comprehensive Educational Facilities Plan that closed Mount Hope High School after the Spring 2011 semester. In August 2011, students from Mount Hope High School in grades nine through twelve transferred to nearby Oak Hill High School, while those in grades six through eight transferred to Collins Middle School, and fifth graders moved to Mount Hope Elementary School. The closure of Mount Hope High School followed the loss of other major employers in Mount Hope including the United States National Mine Health and Safety Academy, which moved to nearby Beckley, and the New River Company.

In April 2011, the West Virginia Board of Education approved a memorandum of understanding with the Fayette County Board of Education and Mount Hope Heritage and Hope Inc., a non-profit organization, to transfer ownership of the Mount Hope High School building to the organization for use as a community center. Mount Hope Heritage and Hope Inc. intended to develop the facility into a youth development center that would offer mentoring, tutoring, and various enrichment activities. Additionally, a part of the building was to serve as the headquarters for the United States Department of Defense joint task force operating in the nearby Summit Bechtel Reserve. By October 2024, the former Mount Hope High School building had become an indoor/outdoor flea market, hosting trick-or-treating, a haunted house, and a pumpkin patch during Halloween.

== Facilities ==
- Old Mount Hope High School and YMCA/Community Building
- U.S. National Register of Historic Places
- U.S. Historic district – Contributing property
- Location: 514 and 518 Main Street (West Virginia Route 211), Mount Hope, West Virginia
- Built: 1925 and 1921
- Part of: Mount Hope Historic District
- NRHP reference No.: 07000785
- Added to NRHP: August 3, 2007

The first Mount Hope High School was built in 1911 on Mount Hope's original log school building site. The high school moved to a new facility built in 1925 at 514 Main Street, and its former site became the Mount Hope Junior High School. The 1925 high school building is a red brick structure exhibiting vernacular and neoclassical architectural styles, with an ashlar stone foundation. This building is a contributing property for the Mount Hope Historic District on the National Register of Historic Places. In 1933, the high school campus was graded and a stone retaining wall was added. Subsequently, new tennis courts were added at the rear of the school. In 1939, the high school renovated the adjacent 1921 red brick neoclassical YMCA building at 518 Main Street to include an auditorium, gymnasium, and dressing rooms, with remodeling costing approximately $75,000. This building is also a contributing property for the Mount Hope Historic District. The school's gymnasium was dedicated in 1941 when West Virginia University and West Virginia Wesleyan College played a basketball game there. In 1938, the Mount Hope Municipal Stadium was constructed on Stadium Drive for the use of Mount Hope's schools, with a concession stand and lavatories added in 1961. The stadium is also a contributing property for the Mount Hope Historic District.

In 1956, Mount Hope High School integrated with DuBois High School, and the consolidated Mount Hope High School moved into the DuBois High School facility, which was completed in 1954. The former high school building became Mount Hope Junior High School. The original high school building and former junior high then became the music building following renovations and was used by the Mustang Band and Glee Club, and the Mustang Corral, which was in the basement.

== Athletics ==
Mount Hope High School's athletic teams were known as the Yellow Jackets until 1930, when school officials changed the athletic teams' name to the Mustangs. In 1959 and 1960, the Mount Hope Mustangs were state co-champions in West Virginia high school classification AA football.

== Publications ==
The school published a yearbook, the Mons Spei, which was first produced in 1919, and was the first record of students' activities at the school. In 1926, the school started publishing its official publication, The Reflector, which was also published in The Raleigh Register. The Reflector later won the State University Journalism Award in 1959. The Reflector was classified as a second class high school publication.

== Administration ==
- Everett Wade Dunkley, principal from 1932 to 1965
- Ashby E. Allen, principal beginning in 1965

== Alumni ==
- Ethel Caffie-Austin, American gospel musician
- Hal Hinte, American professional football player
- Earl Jones, American professional basketball player
- Jack Spadaro, American mining engineer
- Ed Tutwiler, American golfer
- Lonnie Warwick, American professional football player

== Bibliography ==
- Taylor, David L. (January 2007). National Register of Historic Places Registration Form: Mount Hope Historic District (PDF). United States Department of the Interior, National Park Service.
