= WTNJ =

- Mount Hope, West Virginia; United States
- Broadcast area: Beckley, West Virginia; Oak Hill, West Virginia; Charleston, West Virginia
- Frequency: 105.9 MHz
- Branding: 105.9 WTNJ

Programming
- Format: Country

Ownership
- Owner: Southern Communications
- Sister stations: WAXS, WBKW, WCIR-FM, WWNR

History
- First air date: 1980
- Call sign meaning: W Tony (Gonzales) and Nick Joe (Rahall) original owners of WTNJ

Technical information
- Licensing authority: FCC
- Facility ID: 71679
- Class: B
- ERP: 4,400 watts
- HAAT: 467 meters
- Transmitter coordinates: 37°56′51.0″N 81°18′29.0″W

Links
- Public license information: Public file; LMS
- Webcast: Listen Live
- Website: wtnjfm.com

WTNJ (105.9 FM) is a country formatted broadcast radio station licensed to Mount Hope, West Virginia, serving the Beckley/Oak Hill/Charleston area. WTNJ is owned and operated by Southern Communications.

== Call letters' history ==
In 1933, the call letters WTNJ were assigned to a Trenton, New Jersey, station previously known as WOAX.
