= WOAY =

WOAY can refer to:

- WOAY-TV, a television station (channel 31, virtual 4) licensed to serve Oak Hill, West Virginia, United States
- WOAY (AM), a radio station (860 AM) licensed to serve Oak Hill, West Virginia, United States
