= Oak Hill station =

- Oak Hill Railroad Depot
- U.S. National Register of Historic Places
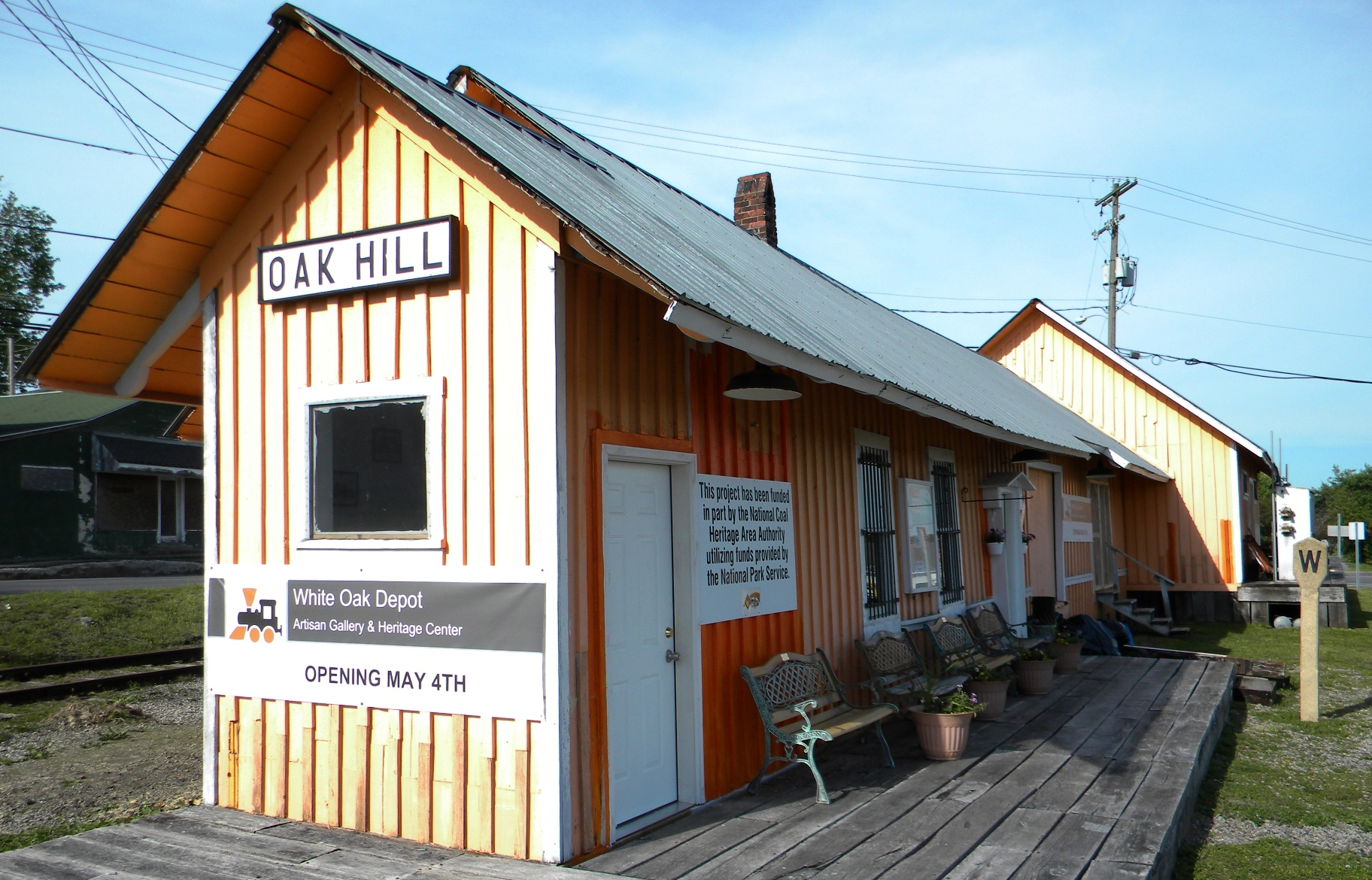
- The Oak Hill Depot in 2013

- Location within West Virginia Location within the United States
- Location: Junction of Virginia Ave. and Central Ave. in Oak Hill, West Virginia
- Coordinates: 37°58′41″N 81°8′59″W
- Area: less than one acre
- Built: 1903
- Architect: White Oak Coal Company
- Architectural style: Late 19th And Early 20th Century American Movements
- NRHP reference No.: 95000255
- Added to NRHP: March 17, 1995

The Oak Hill Railroad Depot is a historic depot in Oak Hill, West Virginia, United States. The depot is located on the southwest corner of Virginia Avenue and Central Avenue. It opened as a station on the White Oak Railway in 1903 and later became part of the Virginian Railway, which it served until 1957. From this year until closure in 1983, it operated as a depot for the Norfolk and Western Railway. The depot now serves as the meeting place for the White Oak chapter of the National Railway Historical Society. It is the only remaining Virginian Railway depot in West Virginia.

== History ==
The Oak Hill Railroad Depot opened in 1903 on the White Oak Railway, a subsidiary of the White Oak Coal Company. The depot served a line from Glen Jean to coal mines in Summerlee and Lochgelly; it initially served as both a checkpoint for coal cars from these mines and a freight and passenger station for the newly incorporated town of Oak Hill. The station's opening led to a commercial boom in Oak Hill, which transformed from a farming community to a commercial center with multiple banks, hotels, and stores. The Virginian Railway leased the depot in 1912 and ultimately bought it in 1922. The depot continued to provide passenger and freight service to Oak Hill until after World War II, when passenger service to Oak Hill ended. The depot became part of the Norfolk and Western Railway in 1957 and provided freight service for the railway until it closed to trains in 1983.

The Norfolk Southern Corp., the holding company for the Norfolk and Western Railway, donated the closed depot to the city of Oak Hill in 1995. The White Oak chapter of the National Railway Historical Society has since restored the depot through donations and a U.S. Department of Transportation grant. Oak Hill began an annual festival known as Depot Day in 1997 to raise money to restore the depot. The depot presently serves as a meeting place for the White Oak chapter of the National Railway Historical Society but is otherwise vacant; it is the sole surviving Virginian Railway depot in West Virginia.

In 2013, the station caught fire in a suspected arson attempt and suffered slight damage.

== Structure ==
The Oak Hill Railroad Depot is a one-story wooden building located on the southwest corner of Central Avenue and Virginia Street, along the Norfolk Southern Railway tracks. It has a board and batten siding with Victorian features, a style representative of small-town railway depots of the early 1900s. The original depot consisted of a passenger waiting area and a station master's office. A warehouse, loading dock, and ramp were added to the depot in 1922. Restoration on the depot began in 1993, at which point it was painted a period shade of gray. Behind the depot, there is a small steam locomotive.

Preceding station	Virginian Railway	Following station
Lively toward Pax	Pax - Lochgelly	Newton toward Lochgelly
Terminus	Carlisle Branch	Carlisle Terminus
