= H. Rus Warne =

American architect

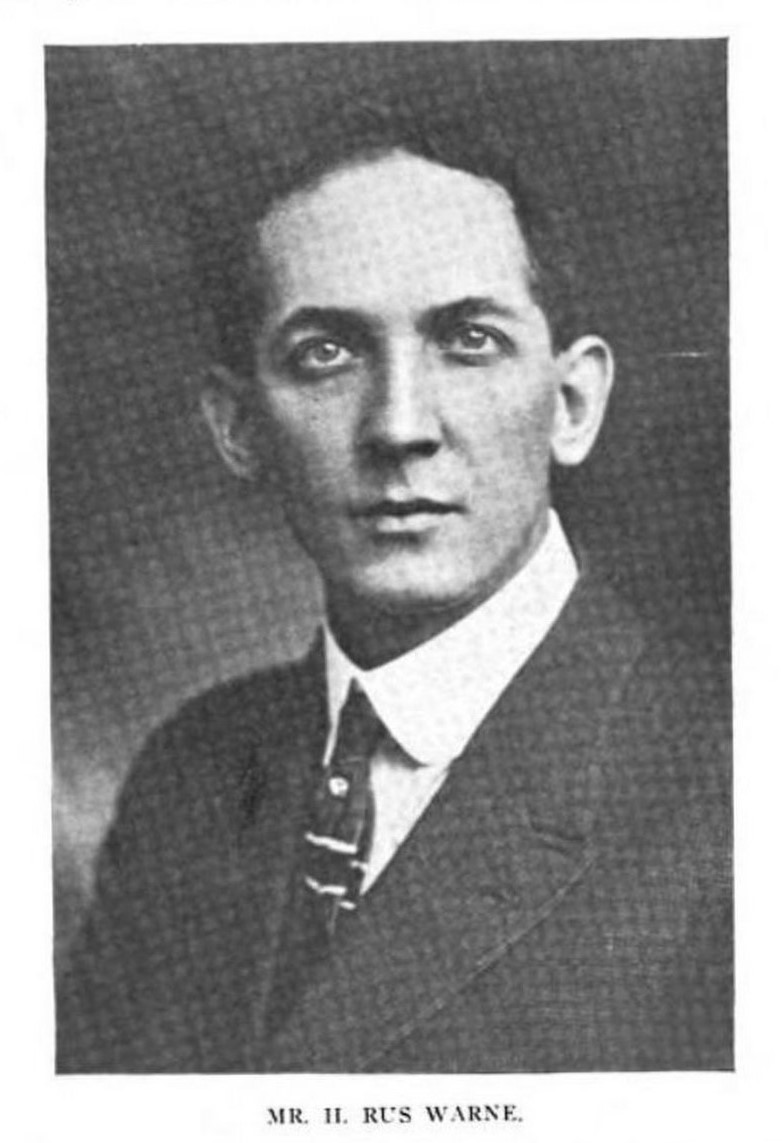
- H. Rus Warne, 1916.
- Born: October 10, 1872; Parkersburg, West Virginia
- Died: April 25, 1954 (aged 81); Charleston, West Virginia
- Resting place: Mount Olivet Cemetery; Parkersburg, West Virginia
- Occupation: Architect
- Buildings: Charleston City Hall, Boone County Courthouse
- Projects: Kanawha County Courthouse additions

Harry Rus Warne (October 10, 1872 – April 25, 1954) was a Charleston, West Virginia-based architect.

He was born at Parkersburg, West Virginia in 1872 and attended the Ohio Mechanics Institute (OMI) in Cincinnati, Ohio. Warne established his architectural practice in Parkersburg in 1892, after having traveled extensively throughout the United States and in Europe. He moved to Charleston in 1902, and formed Silling Associates, Inc. The firm continues today as the oldest continuing architectural firm in West Virginia.

He designed two World’s Fair pavilions for West Virginia. One was the 123-foot tall Coal Column and West Virginia Building at the 1907 Jamestown Exposition; the other was the West Virginia Building for the 1915 Panama–Pacific International Exposition in San Francisco. He also designed many residential homes for wealthy clients in the growing suburbs of Edgewood, South Hills, and Kanawha City near Charleston.

Warne died at home in Charleston April 25, 1954, and his ashes are in the Warne family mausoleum in Mount Olivet Cemetery in Parkersburg.

== Selected works ==
- 1897: Sharon Lodge No. 28 IOOF, Parkersburg, West Virginia, listed on the National Register of Historic Places in 1982.
- 1910: Kenwood (Huntington, West Virginia), Huntington, West Virginia, listed on the National Register of Historic Places in 2007.
- 1913: Old Main (Nicholas County High School), Summersville, West Virginia, listed on the National Register of Historic Places in 1989.
- 1916: Dalgain, Charleston, West Virginia, listed on the National Register of Historic Places in 1984.
- 1917, 1924: Kanawha County Courthouse, Charleston, West Virginia, listed on the National Register of Historic Places in 1978; additions to original 1892 building by Warne and Warne, Tucker & Patteson.
- 1917-1921: Boone County Courthouse (West Virginia), Madison, West Virginia, listed on the National Register of Historic Places in 1981.
- 1921: Charleston City Hall, Charleston, West Virginia, listed on the National Register of Historic Places in 1988.
- 1928: Garnet High School, Charleston, West Virginia, listed on the National Register of Historic Places in 1990; by Warne, Tucker, Silling & Hutchison.
- 1928: St. John's Episcopal Church (Charleston, West Virginia), Charleston, West Virginia, listed on the National Register of Historic Places in 1989; Parish House additions to original building by Warne, Tucker, Silling & Hutchison.
- Also designed properties in the Grosscup Road Historic District, Charleston, West Virginia, listed on the National Register of Historic Places in 1984, and Mount Hope Historic District, Mount Hope, West Virginia, listed on the National Register of Historic Places in 2007.
