= WWNR =

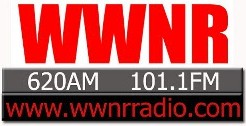
- Beckley, West Virginia; United States
- Broadcast area: Beckley, West Virginia; Oak Hill, West Virginia
- Frequency: 620 kHz
- Branding: WWNR News-Talk 620

Programming
- Format: News/talk/sports
- Affiliations: NBC News Radio; Genesis Communications Network; Radio America; Salem Radio Network; Townhall News; USA Radio Network; Westwood One

Ownership
- Owner: Southern Communications
- Sister stations: WAXS, WBKW, WCIR-FM, WTNJ

History
- First air date: 1946
- Call sign meaning: WW Nick Rahall father of original owners

Technical information
- Licensing authority: FCC
- Class: AM and FM: D
- Power: AM: 5,000 watts day 25 watts night
- ERP: FM: 250 watts
- Transmitter coordinates: 37°45′18.0″N 81°14′12.0″W
- Translator: 101.1 W266AZ (Beckley)

Links
- Public license information: Public file; LMS
- Webcast: Listen Live
- Website: wwnrradio.com

WWNR (620 AM) is a news/talk/sports formatted broadcast radio station licensed to Beckley, West Virginia, serving Beckley and Oak Hill in West Virginia. WWNR is owned and operated by Southern Communications.

WWNR began broadcasting in 1946 on 1450 kHz. It was an affiliate of the Mutual Broadcasting System. In 1951 the station changed its frequency to 620 kHz and increased its power output.

WWNR is currently using a 250-watt translator on 101.1 FM. The transmitter site is on Sullivan Hill south of Beckley.
