= WBKW =

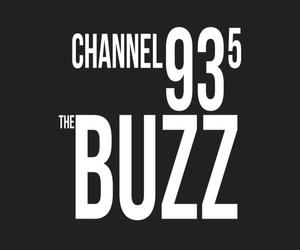
- Beckley, West Virginia; United States
- Broadcast area: Beckley, West Virginia; Oak Hill, West Virginia
- Frequency: 1070 kHz
- Branding: Channel 93.5, the Buzz

Programming
- Format: Alternative rock

Ownership
- Owner: Southern Communications; (Southern Communications Corporation)
- Sister stations: WAXS, WCIR-FM, WTNJ, WWNR

History
- First air date: 1967
- Former call signs: WJKK (1981–1984); WCIR (1967–1981; 1985-1990); WIWS (1990–2011)

Technical information
- Licensing authority: FCC
- Facility ID: 61276
- Class: D
- Power: 10,000 watts day 7,700 watts critical hours
- Transmitter coordinates: 37°45′18.0″N 81°14′12.0″W

Links
- Public license information: Public file; LMS
- Webcast: Listen Live
- Website: buzz935.com

WBKW (1070 AM) is an alternative rock formatted broadcast radio station licensed to Beckley, West Virginia, serving Beckley and Oak Hill in West Virginia. WBKW is owned and operated by Southern Communications.

== History ==
First signed on in January 1967 as WCIR.

On December 25, 2017, the station flipped from Southern gospel to modern rock.

== Translator ==
Call sign	Frequency	City of license	FID	ERP (W)	HAAT	Class	FCC info
W228CF	93.5 FM	Beckley, West Virginia	143018	250	182.6 m (599 ft)	D	LMS
