= Bob Elkins =

American character actor (1932–2022)

- Born: August 15, 1932; Mount Hope, West Virginia, US
- Died: April 27, 2022 (aged 89)
- Occupation: Actor

Bob Elkins (August 15, 1932 – April 27, 2022) was an American character actor who appeared in movies, plays and television productions. He was sometimes credited as Robert Elkins.

== Biography ==
Bob Elkins was born in 1932 in Mount Hope, West Virginia, the son of a struggling coal miner. At age four, he moved with his father, mother and two sisters to Muncie, Indiana, where his father took a job at a lawnmower company. At about that time, the elder Elkins inexplicably became withdrawn and stopped talking to his son. Bob Elkins believed that the lack of communication with his father influenced his acting abilities, although he would not realize it for many years.

When Elkins was 12, he and his family moved to Covington, Kentucky, across the Ohio River from Cincinnati. Shortly thereafter, his father disappeared and was never heard from again. Devastated and confused, the younger Elkins rebelled by skipping school and dabbling in petty crime, including working as a collector for a bookie. He was later arrested after breaking into an office. Although no charges were filed, he received a stern lecture from the arresting police officer, and never committed another crime.

While growing up, Elkins had difficulty reading, and consequently was a poor student. After joining the U.S. Navy at the age of 18, he was diagnosed with dyslexia. While in the Navy, his reading skills improved dramatically, as a result of the tutoring he received from a fellow sailor. After four years of service as a petty officer, Elkins received an honorable discharge and returned home to the Cincinnati area.

After leaving the Navy, Elkins spotted a newspaper ad for an acting school in Cincinnati and enrolled because, as he said, "I had always liked movies." One year later, he began acting professionally in plays and television commercials. In 1980, he landed his first role in a major motion picture, playing Bobby Day the DJ in the Academy Award-winning Coal Miner's Daughter, starring Sissy Spacek and Tommy Lee Jones.

Elkins appeared in other movies and television productions through the years, including Tattered Angel with Lynda Carter and Sandra Seacat, and The Pennsylvania Miners' Story on ABC Television. In 2003, he received the award for Best Actor in the Dublin Film and Music Festival in Ireland, for his portrayal of a homeless man in an independent film entitled Homefree.

== Death ==
Elkins died on April 27, 2022, at the age of 89.

== Filmography ==
- Andrew (TV)
- Just Passing Through (TV)
- The Trouble with Mother (TV – 1979)
- This Other Eden (TV – 1980)
- Coal Miner's Daughter (1980)
- Just Another Stupid Kid (TV – 1984)
- Zombie Cult Massacre (1998)
- Brotherly Love (TV – 2000)
- April's Fool (2001)
- The Elevator Man (2002)
- James Cameron's Expedition: Bismarck (TV – 2002)
- The Pennsylvania Miners' Story (TV – 2002)
- Homefree (2003)
- Within (2005)
- Flavor Invisible (2006)
- The Greater Good (2006)
- Beowulf: Prince of the Geats (2007)
- Tattered Angel (2008)
