= WOAY (AM) =

- Oak Hill, West Virginia; United States
- Broadcast area: Oak Hill, West Virginia; Beckley, West Virginia
- Frequency: 860 kHz
- Branding: AM 860 WOAY

Programming
- Format: Religious

Ownership
- Owner: Foothills Broadcasting; (Mountainner Media, Inc.)
- Sister stations: WKTS

History
- First air date: 1947
- Call sign meaning: intended to be "WOAK" (for Oak Hill), but the handwritten application was misread by the FCC

Technical information
- Licensing authority: FCC
- Facility ID: 12550
- Class: D
- Power: 10,000 watts day; 5,000 watts critical hours; 11 watts night
- Transmitter coordinates: 37°57′30″N 81°9′3″W

Links
- Public license information: Public file; LMS
- Webcast: Listen live
- Website: www.woayradio.com

WOAY (860 kHz) is a religious-formatted broadcast radio station licensed to Oak Hill, West Virginia, United States, serving Oak Hill and Beckley. WOAY is owned and operated by Foothills Broadcasting.

== History ==
WOAY was founded in 1947 by local businessman Robert R. Thomas, Jr., and was the flagship of a family-owned communications group that would later include WOAY-FM (94.1, now WAXS) in 1948 and WOAY-TV (channel 4) in 1954. Thomas originally planned to use "WOAK" as the call sign (standing for its city of license of Oak Hill), but the handwritten application was misread by the Federal Communications Commission (FCC), with the "K" mistaken for a "Y". Early programming on the station included country, bluegrass, and southern gospel music.

On January 1, 1953, WOAY began its broadcast day with what may have been the first announcement of the death of Hank Williams, Sr. The performer was discovered dead in Oak Hill in the early morning hours of New Year's Day of an apparent heart attack, while en route to an appearance in Canton, Ohio.

In the early morning hours of September 30, 1977, WOAY's studio building was destroyed in a fire. The radio and television stations reset their operations in what had been the undamaged production auditorium for WOAY-TV's local professional wrestling show, and would resume operations over the following weeks; WOAY (AM) returned to the air five weeks after the fire. By this time, the station had changed formats and was playing rock music in a simulcast with WOAY-FM.

Three months prior to the fire, in July 1977, station owner and founder Robert R. Thomas Jr. died, and ownership of the WOAY stations was passed onto his wife Helen and their five children. Robert R. Thomas III succeeded his father as president of the stations.

In the mid-1980s WOAY began to evolve into a full-time Christian radio station, with music and teaching programs; the station was also affiliated with the Moody Broadcasting Network. The Thomas family sold both radio stations in 1990, though they continue to own WOAY-TV as of 2026.

Former West Virginia state senator Shirley Love began his broadcasting career at the station as an announcer and sportscaster.

The station must power down to 11 watts at night to protect CJBC in Toronto, rendering it all but unlistenable even in Oak Hill.
