= Hal Hinte =

American football player (1920–1996)

No. 15, 50
- Position: End

Personal information
- Born: January 25, 1920
- Died: February 3, 1996 (aged 76); Jacksonville, Florida, U.S.
- Listed height: 6 ft 1 in (1.85 m)
- Listed weight: 195 lb (88 kg)

Career information
- High school: Mount Hope (Mount Hope, West Virginia)
- College: Pittsburgh

Career history
- Green Bay Packers (1942); Pittsburgh Steelers (1942)

Career statistics
- Games played: 4
- Stats at Pro Football Reference

Harold Hinte (January 25, 1920 – February 3, 1996) was an American professional football player who was an end in the National Football League (NFL) for the Green Bay Packers and Pittsburgh Steelers during the 1942 NFL season. He played college football for the Pittsburgh Panthers. After his brief football career, he served in the United States Army during World War II and was a high school basketball and football coach.

== Early life and college ==
Harold Hinte was born on January 25, 1920, although sources differ on whether he was born in Mount Hope, West Virginia, or Pittsburgh, Pennsylvania. Hinte had two nicknames that he was known by: Hal and Tex. He graduated from Mount Hope High School in Mount Hope, West Virginia, and then attended the University of Pittsburgh where he played college football for the Pittsburgh Panthers. In 1941 with the Panthers, he was a third string end. He was also a letterman before deciding not to return to the Panthers in 1942; his initial intention was to join the United States Army.

== Career ==
Hinte was signed by Curly Lambeau to play the end position for the Green Bay Packers right before the start of exhibition games before the 1942 NFL season. Before his football career, Hinte was a police detective by trade. Lambeau planned to have Hinte play alongside fellow ends Don Hutson and Larry Craig. Hinte only played in one game for the Packers before being traded to the Pittsburgh Steelers after failing to maintain a roster spot. He considered playing for Washington but decided on Pittsburgh to be close to his family and to prepare for the possibility that he would be drafted into the Army. He finished off the 1942 season by playing in three games for the Steelers. The Philadelphia Inquirer noted after the season that Hinte was "unusually adept at detecting rival teams' strategy and smearing their plays". The Steelers signed Hinte for the 1943 season but he never played a game for them that year. During his time playing football, Hinte also took part in various boxing matches. He fought as a heavyweight, losing once (under the name Billy Sullivan) in 1942. He also fought in a bout the day before he left for the Army, losing to a boxer named Tony Ciro.

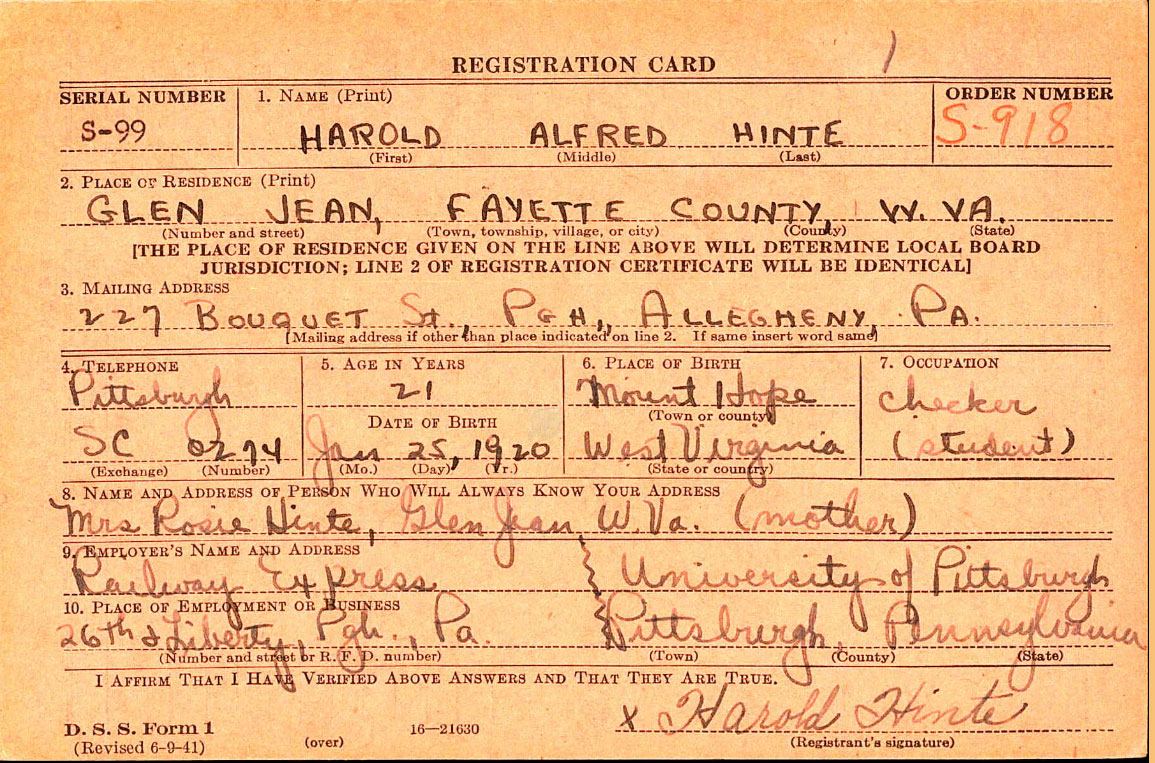
Hinte's World War II draft card

Hinte served in the United States Army during World War II after his playing career. After a year stateside, Hinte was medically discharged because of a knee injury. Hinte was stationed at Fort Meade, where he won their base's boxing heavyweight boxing title. After his military service, he was a teacher and coached sports at various high schools.

== Personal life ==
Hinte married Ola Pearl (née Vest) in 1945, although they divorced two years later. Hinte married his second wife, Virginia (née Wainwright), in March 1948. He died on February 3, 1996, in Jacksonville, Florida.
