= George Floyd protests in West Virginia =

2020 civil unrest after the murder of George Floyd

- Part of George Floyd protests
- Date: May 30 – June 6, 2020 (1 week)
- Location: West Virginia, United States
- Caused by: Police brutality; Institutional racism against African Americans; Reaction to the murder of George Floyd; Economic, racial and social inequality

This is a list of protests in the U.S. State of West Virginia related to the murder of George Floyd.

== Locations ==
=== Beckley ===
As many as 50 protesters met in Beckley at the corner of Robert C. Byrd Drive and Neville Street on Sunday, May 31, for a peaceful demonstration.

=== Charles Town ===
Around 500 protesters gathered in Charles Town on June 7.

=== Charleston ===
A group of protesters marched around the West Virginia State Capitol complex on May 30. Hundreds of people protested police brutality outside of Charleston City Hall and the Charleston Police Department on May 31.

=== Clarksburg ===
On June 3, a crowd of about 100 people gathered outside the Harrison County Courthouse and marched through downtown Clarksburg. At one point protesters lay down in the streets while chanting, "I can't breathe."

=== Fairmont ===
A large group marched through the streets of downtown Fairmont on May 30. Hundreds filled the streets.

=== Huntington ===
There were two protests in Huntington on May 30, one at Ritter Park and a second one at Pullman Square. Hundreds of protesters attended.

=== Martinsburg ===
A protest on May 31, with around a hundred participants, was disrupted by gunfire, though no injuries were reported. Eight people were arrested in connection with the protest.

=== Morgantown ===
Protesters gathered on the downtown campus of West Virginia University on May 30. In addition, hundreds of protesters marched in downtown Morgantown on June 2.

=== Parkersburg ===
On May 31, a crowd of protesters peacefully marched through downtown Parkersburg. Although they did not have a permit to protest, no arrests were made.

=== Weirton ===
On June 6, protesters peacefully demonstrated against police brutality outside the Weirton Community Center.

=== Wheeling ===
Hundreds of people participated in a protest on May 31 in downtown Wheeling. The event began in front of Wheeling City Hall, where the growing crowd necessitated the closure of Chapline Street. The crowd then marched downtown and blocked several intersections, including Interstate 70, where a violent confrontation with police occurred.
