= WOAY-TV =

Television station in Oak Hill, West Virginia

- Oak Hill–Beckley–; Bluefield, West Virginia; United States
- City: Oak Hill, West Virginia
- Channels: Digital: 31 (UHF); Virtual: 4
- Branding: WOAY 4; NewsWatch 4

Programming
- Affiliations: 4.1: ABC; 4.2: Dabl

Ownership
- Owner: Thomas and DiBartolomeo families; (Thomas Broadcasting Company)

History
- Founded: June 2, 1954
- First air date: December 14, 1954
- Former channel numbers: Analog: 4 (VHF, 1954–2009); Digital: 50 (UHF, until 2019); Virtual: 50 (2009–2019)
- Former affiliations: DuMont (1954–1956); CBS (primary 1959–1967, per program 1967–1975); UPN (secondary)
- Call sign meaning: derived from former sister station WOAY radio

Technical information
- Licensing authority: FCC
- Facility ID: 66804
- ERP: 320 kW
- HAAT: 210.1 m (689 ft)
- Transmitter coordinates: 37°57′26″N 81°9′2″W

Links
- Public license information: Public file; LMS
- Website: woay.com

WOAY-TV (channel 4) is a television station licensed to Oak Hill, West Virginia, United States, serving the Bluefield–Beckley–Oak Hill market as an affiliate of ABC. It has been locally owned by the Thomas family since its inception, and its studios and transmitter are co-located on Legends Highway in Scarbro, just outside the Oak Hill city limits (though with an Oak Hill mailing address).

== History ==
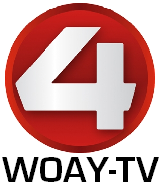
Logo used until 2009.

The first television station in southern West Virginia, WOAY-TV, began operations on December 14, 1954, on channel 4. The station was founded by local businessman Robert R. Thomas Jr., and operated as a sister station to WOAY (860 AM) and WOAY-FM 94.1. The station began as a primary ABC affiliate, but in its early years maintained a secondary relationship with the DuMont Television Network, which it lost when DuMont shut down in 1956. In 1959, it switched its primary affiliation to CBS, retaining a secondary affiliation with ABC.

Channel 4 became a full ABC affiliate on February 19, 1967, opting to affiliate with what then-station manager Robert Brown referred to as "the nation's fastest-growing network," and dropped most of its remaining CBS programs. WOAY-TV initially continued to air the CBS Evening News for some time afterward, mainly because the full CBS affiliate nearest to the area, WCHS-TV (channel 8) in Charleston, did not carry it (WOAY dropped it by 1968 when WCHS began clearing it). Another CBS series, Captain Kangaroo, was also retained, presumably until ABC launched AM America (the predecessor of Good Morning America) in 1975.

In previous decades, the station was known throughout the area for a very theatrical professional wrestling show that it produced with local talent in an arena adjacent to its studios. However, this ended on September 30, 1977, when WOAY's main studio, control room, offices, and transmitter building were destroyed in a fire. The stations' facilities were rebuilt in the former wrestling arena, where WOAY-TV remains today. Channel 4 returned to the air within two weeks after the fire, first with ABC programs, and local productions resumed soon thereafter.

Three months prior to the fire, in July 1977, station owner and founder Robert R. Thomas Jr. died, and ownership of the WOAY stations was passed onto his wife Helen and their five children. Robert R. (Robbie) Thomas III succeeded his father as president of the stations, and oversaw WOAY-TV until his death in November 2016. The Thomas family attempted to exit broadcasting in 1990, successfully selling the radio stations but ultimately chose to retain WOAY-TV after a failed sale to Withers Broadcasting Companies, owner of CBS affiliate WDTV in Bridgeport. Ownership of the station is now jointly held by Robbie Thomas's sister, Sarah Ann Thomas, and daughter Robin Thomas DiBartolomeo, who also replaced her father as general manager.

WOAY-TV turned off its analog signal at 11:35 p.m. on June 12, 2009, and remained on digital channel 50. On that date, WOAY dropped its longtime on-air moniker of "TV 4", and began identifying simply as "WOAY Television". Unlike most U.S. TV stations after the digital transition, it did not use virtual channel technology to remap its signal to its former analog channel 4. That changed on October 19, 2019, when the station returned to its original virtual allocation as part of its physical move from channel 50 to 31, as part of the Federal Communications Commission-mandated frequency repack. It also moved to channel 4 and returned its longtime on-air moniker of "TV 4".

In 2009, WOAY-TV revamped its technical infrastructure to become the first high-definition station in West Virginia. The station clears the majority of the ABC network schedule.

== Subchannels ==
The station's signal is multiplexed:

Subchannels of WOAY-TV
Channel	Res.	Short name	Programming
4.1	720p	WOAY-HD	ABC
4.2	480i	DABL-TV	Dabl (4:3)

== See also ==
- Channel 31 digital TV stations in the United States
- Channel 4 virtual TV stations in the United States
