= WCIR =

WCIR may refer to:

- WCIR-FM, a radio station (103.7 FM) licensed to Beckley, West Virginia, United States
- WCIR-LP, a low-power television station (channel 2) licensed to Beckley, West Virginia, United States
