= Oak Hill High School (West Virginia) =

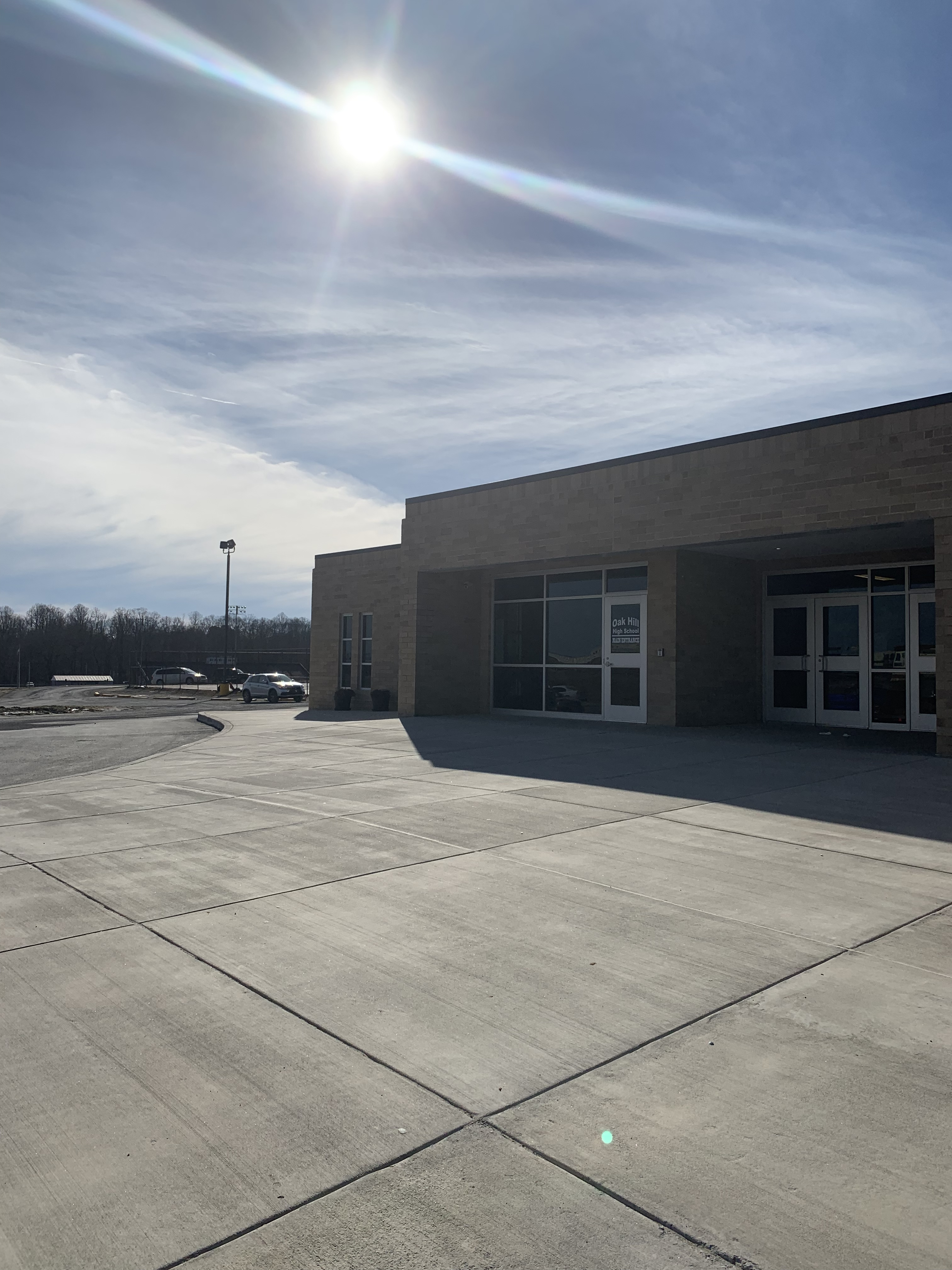

Location
- 350 W. Oyler Avenue; Oak Hill, Fayette County, West Virginia; United States; 37.99117°N 81.14831°W

Information
- Motto: “Where what matters most, is you!”
- Established: 1928
- School board: Fayette County Board of Education
- School district: Fayette County Schools
- Principal: Katie Keffer Hayes
- Faculty: 80
- Teaching staff: 69.00 (FTE)
- Enrollment: 1,089 (2023–2024)
- Student to teacher ratio: 15.78
- Classrooms: +50
- Campus: The Oak Hill Educational Complex
- Campus size: Large
- Colors: Red and black
- Song: “On, Red Devils”
- Mascot: Red Devils
- Website: Oak Hill High School

Oak Hill High School (previously known as Collins High School) is a high school located in Oak Hill, West Virginia. Its mascot is the Red Devil.

In 2011, the state Board of Education closed nearby Mount Hope High School and those students were transferred to OHHS. Then on September 6, 2016, a special state committee voted to split the student body of Valley High School between Riverside High School and Oak Hill, and to close Fayetteville High School and send that student body to Oak Hill.
