= Lochgelly, West Virginia =

- Unincorporated community
- Location within West Virginia Location within the United States
- Coordinates: 38°00′38″N 81°08′42″W
- Country: United States
- State: West Virginia
- County: Fayette
- Elevation: 1,942 ft (592 m)
- Time zone: UTC-5 (Eastern (EST))
  - Summer (DST): UTC-4 (EDT)
- ZIP code: 25866
- Area codes: 304 & 681
- GNIS feature ID: 1554981

Lochgelly, originally named Stewart, is an unincorporated community in Fayette County, West Virginia, United States. Lochgelly is 2.5 miles (4.0 km) north of Oak Hill. Lochgelly has a post office with ZIP code 25866.

The community was named after Lochgelly, in Scotland.
