= WKTS =

- Kingston, Tennessee; United States
- Frequency: 90.1 MHz
- Branding: 90.1 The Bridge

Programming
- Format: Contemporary Christian

Ownership
- Owner: Foothills Resource Group, Inc.
- Sister stations: WOAY

History
- Call sign meaning: KingSTon (transposed)

Technical information
- Licensing authority: FCC
- Facility ID: 91391
- Class: A
- ERP: 55 watts vertical
- HAAT: 193 meters (633 ft)
- Transmitter coordinates: 35°45′57.00″N 84°34′33.00″W

Links
- Public license information: Public file; LMS
- Webcast: Listen Live
- Website: bridgeradiofm.com

WKTS (90.1 FM) is a radio station broadcasting a contemporary Christian music format. Licensed to Kingston, Tennessee, United States, the station is currently owned by Foothills Broadcasting, Inc.
