= Fayette County Schools (West Virginia) =

School district in West Virginia, United States

Location
- Fayetteville, West Virginia Fayette County, West Virginia United States

District information
- Type: Public School District
- Superintendent: Gary Hough
- NCES District ID: 5400300

Other information
- Website: boe.faye.k12.wv.us

Fayette County Schools is a public school district in Fayette County, West Virginia. Its offices are located in the county seat of Fayetteville.

== Board of education ==
Fayette County Schools is under the supervision of the elected Fayette County Board of Education, made up of the following members,

- James P. Gray, President
- Stephen G. Slockett, Vice President
- Cindy Whitlock
- Gary Ray
- Joseph Groom

== Schools ==
=== High Schools ===
- Meadow Bridge High School, Meadow Bridge
- Midland Trail High School, Hico
- Oak Hill High School, Oak Hill

=== Middle Schools ===
- Oak Hill Middle School, Oak Hill

=== Intermediate Schools ===
- New River Intermediate School, Oak Hill

=== Elementary/Middle Schools ===
- Fayetteville PK-8, Fayetteville
- Valley PK-8, Smithers

=== Elementary Schools ===
- Ansted Elementary School, Ansted
- Divide Elementary School, Lookout
- Meadow Bridge Elementary, Meadow Bridge
- New River Primary School, Oak Hill

=== Vocational Schools ===
- Fayette Institute of Technology, Oak Hill

=== Former Schools ===
- Beckwith Elementary School
- Danese Elementary School
- Fayetteville Elementary School
- Gatewood Elementary School
- Gauley Bridge Elementary
- Mount Hope Elementary
- Oak Hill Elementary
- Oak Hill East End Elementary School
- Page Elementary School
- Pax Elementary School
- Powellton Elementary School
- Rosedale Elementary School
- Scarbro Elementary School
- Valley Elementary School
- New River Elementary
- Ansted Middle School
- Fayetteville Middle School
- Montgomery Middle School
- Mount Hope Middle School
- Nutall Middle School
- Fayetteville High School
- Gauley Bridge High School
- Mount Hope High School
- Valley High School
