= Midland Trail High School =

Coordinates: 38.11229°N 80.99657°W

Information
- Established: 1976; 50 years ago
- School district: Fayette County Schools
- Principal: Richard Petitt
- Grades: 6-12
- Enrollment: 631 (2023–2024)
- Colors: Blue and red
- Nickname: Patriots
- Website: https://www.boe.faye.k12.wv.us/o/mths

Midland Trail High School is a public 6-12 school located in Hico, West Virginia in Fayette County located upon the historic Midland Trail highway (US Rt 60,) from which it gets its name. The 65-acre (260,000 m^{2}) campus is located 6 miles (9.7 km) north of the New River Gorge National River and New River Bridge in Fayette County. This area is in the south central area of West Virginia just 50 miles (80 km) east-southeast of Charleston, the state capitol. The school is headed by Principal Richard Petitt and Assistant Principal Melinda Burdette.

== History ==
Midland Trail was created in 1976 with the consolidation of two schools, Ansted High School (6 miles to the west,) and Nuttall High School (4 miles to the east.) The spirit of the US bicentennial led to the original choice of school colors of orange and brown with a bison mascot giving way to red-white-blue colors with a Patriot mascot before the doors opened for occupancy. This patriotic color choice satisfied the alumni of the original schools, as it used the "red" from Ansted's Highlanders and the "blue" from Nuttall's Generals. The two original schools were converted to middle schools. Considering the two schools were fierce rivals prior to consolidation there was very little conflict when they were combined.

== Enrollment ==
Advanced Placement (AP) classes, college classes on campus through West Virginia University Institute of Technology, and WV EDGE classes are offered to those wanting to attend college after graduation. Students in their junior and senior years can elect to attend the regional Fayette Institute of Technology in nearby Oak Hill for vocational-technical classes.

The school has nearly 800 students, and its school zone spans the rural northern part of Fayette County, West Virginia. The demographics are predominantly white with a near equal split male/female. Many graduates go on to attend area colleges. The community is a rural farming region. The local adult population is engaged in tertiary work and many are commuters to jobs in surrounding towns. Trail's athletes compete in the WVSSAC with a classification of Class "A." Sports offered include American football, golf, soccer, basketball, cheerleading, baseball, softball and athletics.

Midland Trail also has numerous clubs, sports, and organizations on campus where students contribute their time and spirit to enrich the Midland Trail community. Students and faculty produce an annual yearbook called the "Patrian," a school newspaper called the "Trail," occasional literary publications, a daily video news program called "Trail-Talk," and also are integral in a variety of technical jobs taking photos, working on the school website, and serving as a resource to staff and learners. Students also help the community with a variety of graphic arts needs when called upon. An active alumni chapter is in place to represent Trail graduates, as well as those of Ansted and Nuttall High Schools.

Midland Trail High School is governed by a student council that works in concert with the faculty and staff. The student body president is one of the members of the Local School Improvement Council (LSIC.) Four seniors make up the student body officers, and also four officers are elected from each class to make up the rest of the student council. The council must work with their advisor and follow the Midland Trail Constitution as its guideline.
