= Randy Gilkey =

American singer-songwriter

- Born: September 16, 1976 (age 49); Oak Hill, West Virginia, U.S.
- Genres: Americana
- Instruments: Piano, drums,guitar,harmonica,bass guitar
- Years active: 1989–present

Randy Gilkey (born September 16, 1976) is an American singer, songwriter, multi-instrumentalist, producer and recording engineer from Oak Hill, West Virginia. Gilkey lost his eyesight shortly after birth when too much oxygen was pumped into an incubator, where both of his retinas became detached. Gilkey began playing piano aged two. He tours, records and performs with his band "The Boatmen".

== Musical career ==
Gilkey's instrumentation can be found on albums by artists such as The Drifters and Maurice Williams and The Zodiacs. Randy has played on stage with artists such as Chuck Berry and David Holt and has appeared on NPR's Mountain Stage several times.

In July 2011, "The Boatmen" released their self-titled debut album at FloydFest.

In November 2017, Gilkey announced that he would audition for America's Got Talent to help him reach a national audience.

He is a nominee for the West Virginia Music Hall of Fame.

== Personal life ==
Gilkey resides in his hometown of Oak Hill, West Virginia, and continues to regularly play events in Beckley and the surrounding areas.
