= Old Main (Nicholas County High School) =

- Nicholas County High School (Ol Mai G)
- U.S. National Register of Historic Places
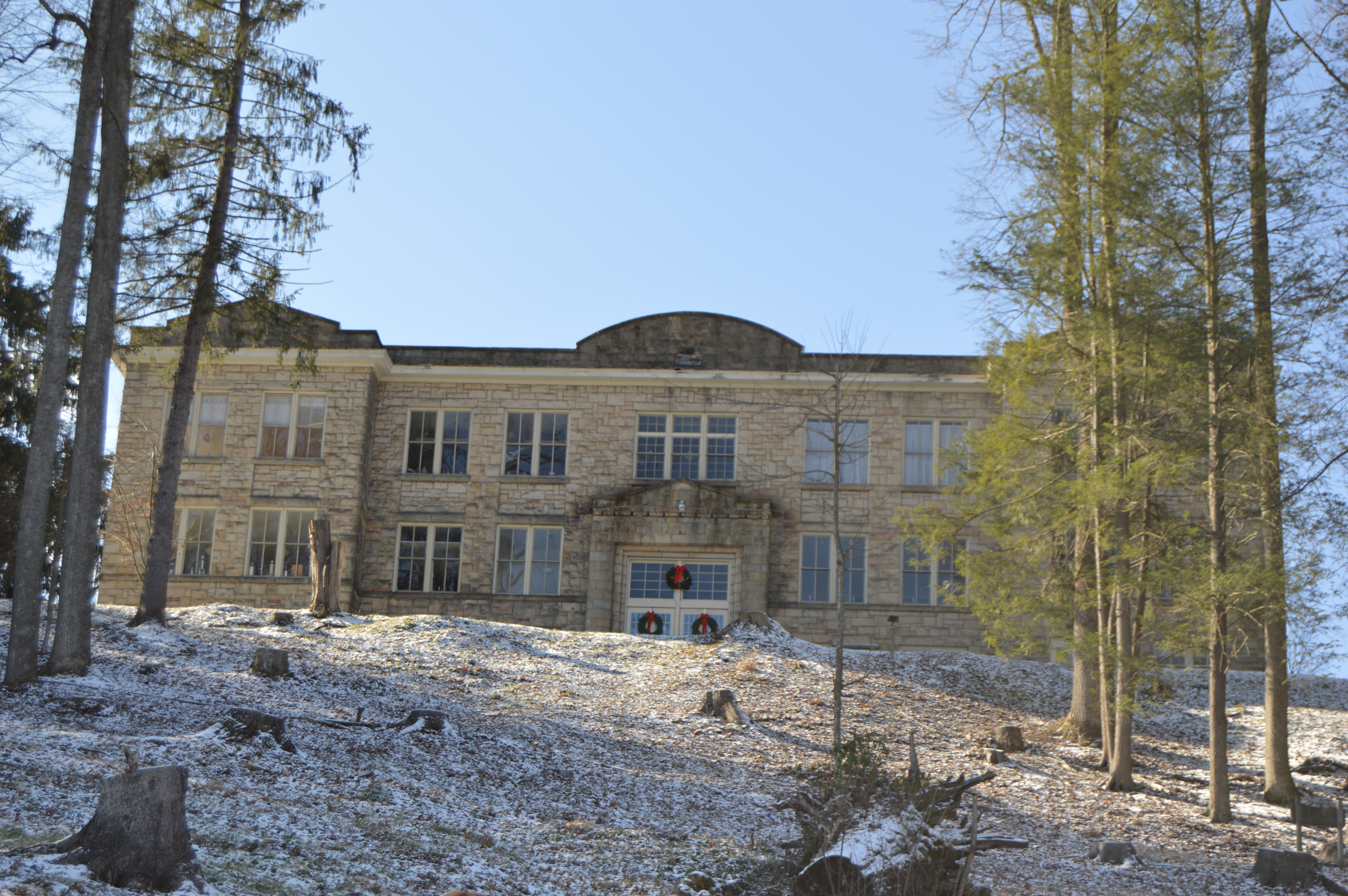
- Front, seen from below

- Location within West Virginia Location within the United States
- Location: Main St., Summersville, West Virginia
- Coordinates: 38°16′51″N 80°51′27″W
- Area: 3 acres (12,000 m^{2})
- Built: 1913
- Architect: H. Rus Warne; Shrake, P.Q., & Son
- Architectural style: Renaissance
- NRHP reference No.: 89000185
- Added to NRHP: March 27, 1989

Old Main, the former Nicholas County High School, is a school building located in Summersville, West Virginia. The two-story stone Renaissance-style building was constructed in 1913 and graduated its first class in 1915.

From 1915 to 1930, the school also served as the site of a State Normal School for teachers. The school was eventually replaced by the current Nicholas County High School, which is located on a separate campus north of Summersville. Summersville Junior High School occupied the site afterwards, until a new site for SJHS behind NCHS was completed.

The Old Main building was added to the National Register of Historic Places on March 27, 1989.
