= Dalgain =

Historic house in West Virginia, United States

- U.S. National Register of Historic Places
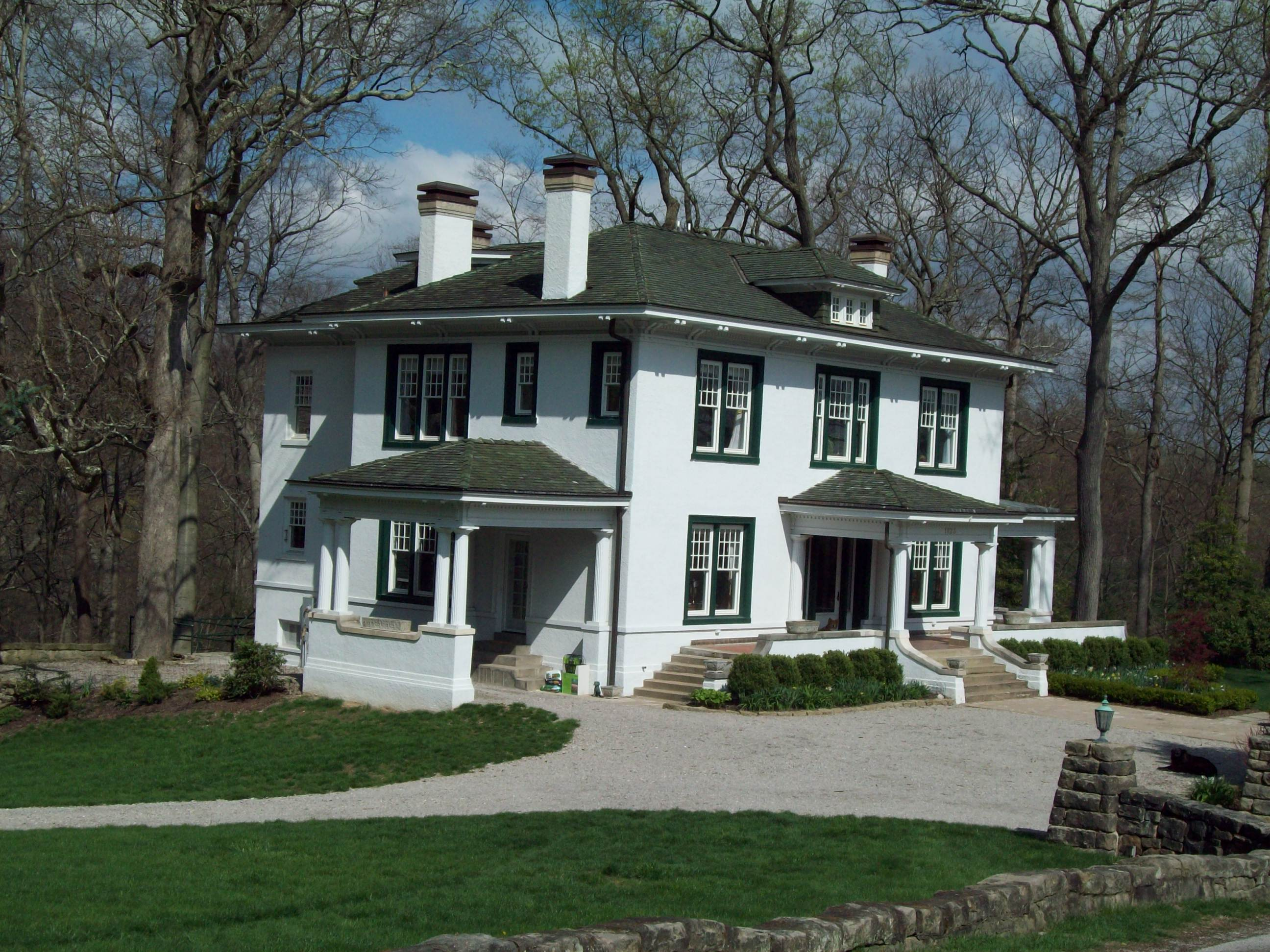
- Dalgain, April 2009

- Location within West Virginia Location within the United States
- Location: 1223 Staunton Rd., Charleston, West Virginia
- Coordinates: 38°20′18″N 81°38′15″W
- Area: 2 acres (0.81 ha)
- Built: 1916
- Architect: H. Rus Warne
- Architectural style: American Four Square
- MPS: South Hills MRA
- NRHP reference No.: 84000404
- Added to NRHP: October 26, 1984

Dalgain, also known as the McCabe House, is a historic home located at Charleston, West Virginia. Robert E, McCabe, for whom the house was built in 1916, was a prominent Charleston attorney active in the city's business life. It is an American Foursquare-style house that features a white stucco exterior and green roof.

The house remains a private residence.

It was listed on the National Register of Historic Places in 1984 as part of the South Hills Multiple Resource Area.
