= Sharon Lodge No. 28 IOOF =

- U.S. National Register of Historic Places
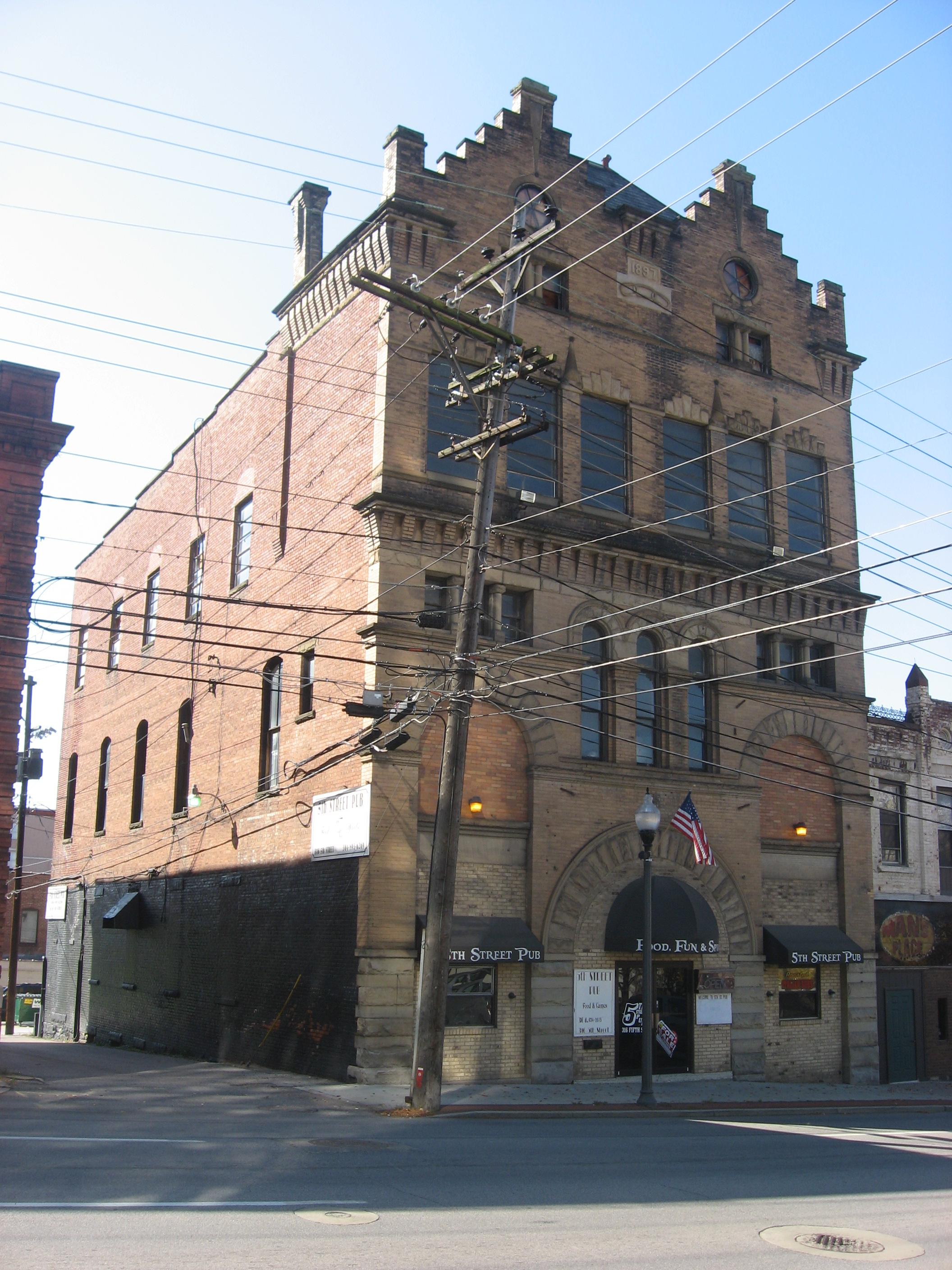
- Front and southern side of the building

- Location within West Virginia Location within the United States
- Location: 316 5th St., Parkersburg, West Virginia
- Coordinates: 39°15′55″N 81°33′37″W
- Area: less than one acre
- Built: 1897
- Architect: H. Rus Warne; Charfer, J. M.
- Architectural style: Romanesque
- MPS: Downtown Parkersburg MRA
- NRHP reference No.: 82001784
- Added to NRHP: October 8, 1982

Sharon Lodge No. 28 IOOF is a historic Independent Order of Odd Fellows clubhouse located at Parkersburg, Wood County, West Virginia. It was designed and built in 1897, by noted West Virginia architect H. Rus Warne (1872-1954). It is a five-story, masonry building in an eclectic Romanesque Revival style. It features a deep Chateauesque hip roof, fronted by two stepped gable parapets.

It was listed on the National Register of Historic Places in 1982.

== See also ==
- National Register of Historic Places listings in Wood County, West Virginia
