= Grosscup Road Historic District =

Historic district in West Virginia, United States

- U.S. National Register of Historic Places
- U.S. Historic district
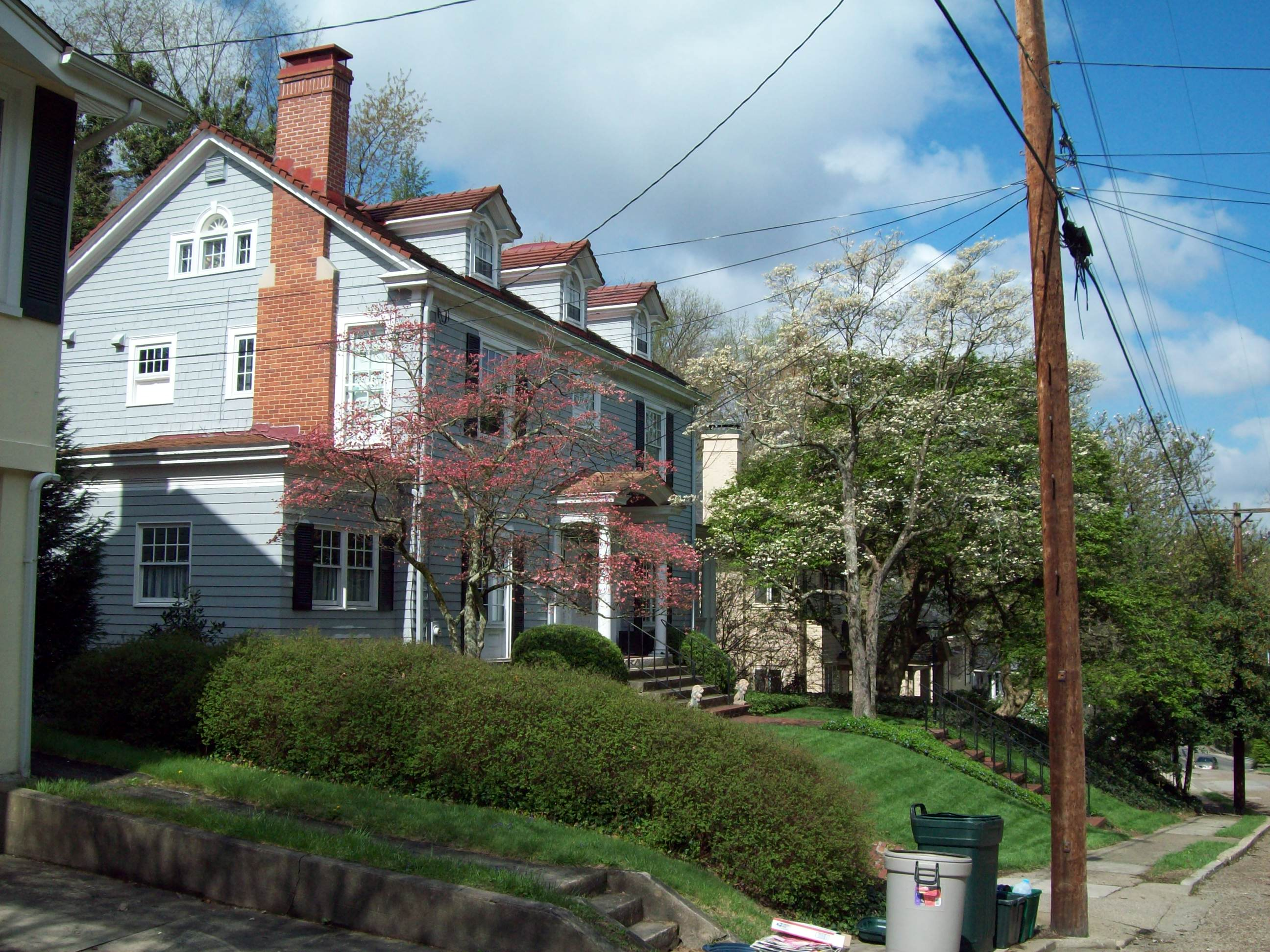
- Grosscup Road Homes, April 2009

- Location within West Virginia Location within the United States
- Location: Grosscup, Roscommon, Roller, and Bridge Rds., Charleston, West Virginia
- Coordinates: 38°20′35″N 81°38′15″W
- Area: 10 acres (4.0 ha)
- Built: 1890
- Architect: Multiple; H. Rus Warne
- Architectural style: Late 19th And 20th Century Revivals, Late Victorian, Bungalow
- MPS: South Hills MRA
- NRHP reference No.: 84003607
- Added to NRHP: January 26, 1984

Grosscup Road Historic District is a national historic district located at Charleston, West Virginia. The district is a neighborhood of 22, 19th and early 20th century residences. They are architecturally and historically significant residences that were, and remain today, the residences of Charleston's prominent industrial, commercial, and political families.

It was listed on the National Register of Historic Places in 1984 as part of the South Hills Multiple Resource Area.
