= Summerlee, West Virginia =

- Unincorporated community
- Location within West Virginia Location within the United States
- Coordinates: 38°00′10″N 81°09′36″W
- Country: United States
- State: West Virginia
- County: Fayette
- Elevation: 2,001 ft (610 m)
- Time zone: UTC-5 (Eastern (EST))
  - Summer (DST): UTC-4 (EDT)
- Area codes: 304 & 681
- GNIS feature ID: 1555743

Summerlee is an unincorporated community and coal town in Fayette County, West Virginia, United States. Summerlee is 2 miles (3.2 km) north-northwest of Oak Hill. The Summerlee Mine was located here and was owned by the New River Coal Company.

The community supposedly is named after a place in Scotland. The Scottish Summerlee is an area within the town of Coatbridge.
