= Valley High School (Smithers, West Virginia) =

- Greyhound Lane; Smithers, WV 25186; United States

Information
- School district: Fayette County Schools
- Grades: 6-12
- Campus size: small
- Colors: Navy blue and Gray
- Athletics: Football, Track, Baseball, Basketball, cheer, softball
- Athletics conference: A (WVSSAC)
- Mascot: Greyhound
- Information: 304-442-8284
- Website: http://vhs.faye.k12.wv.us/

Valley High School was a combined middle and high school, serving grades 6 through 12, located in Smithers, West Virginia.

On September 7, 2016, a special state committee voted to close the school and split the student body between Riverside High School in Kanawha County and Oak Hill High School.

The school closed at the end of the 2018–19 school year. The former Valley High School campus is now Valley PK-8, a combined elementary and middle school.
