= Mount Hope Historic District =

Historic district in West Virginia, United States

- U.S. National Register of Historic Places
- U.S. Historic district
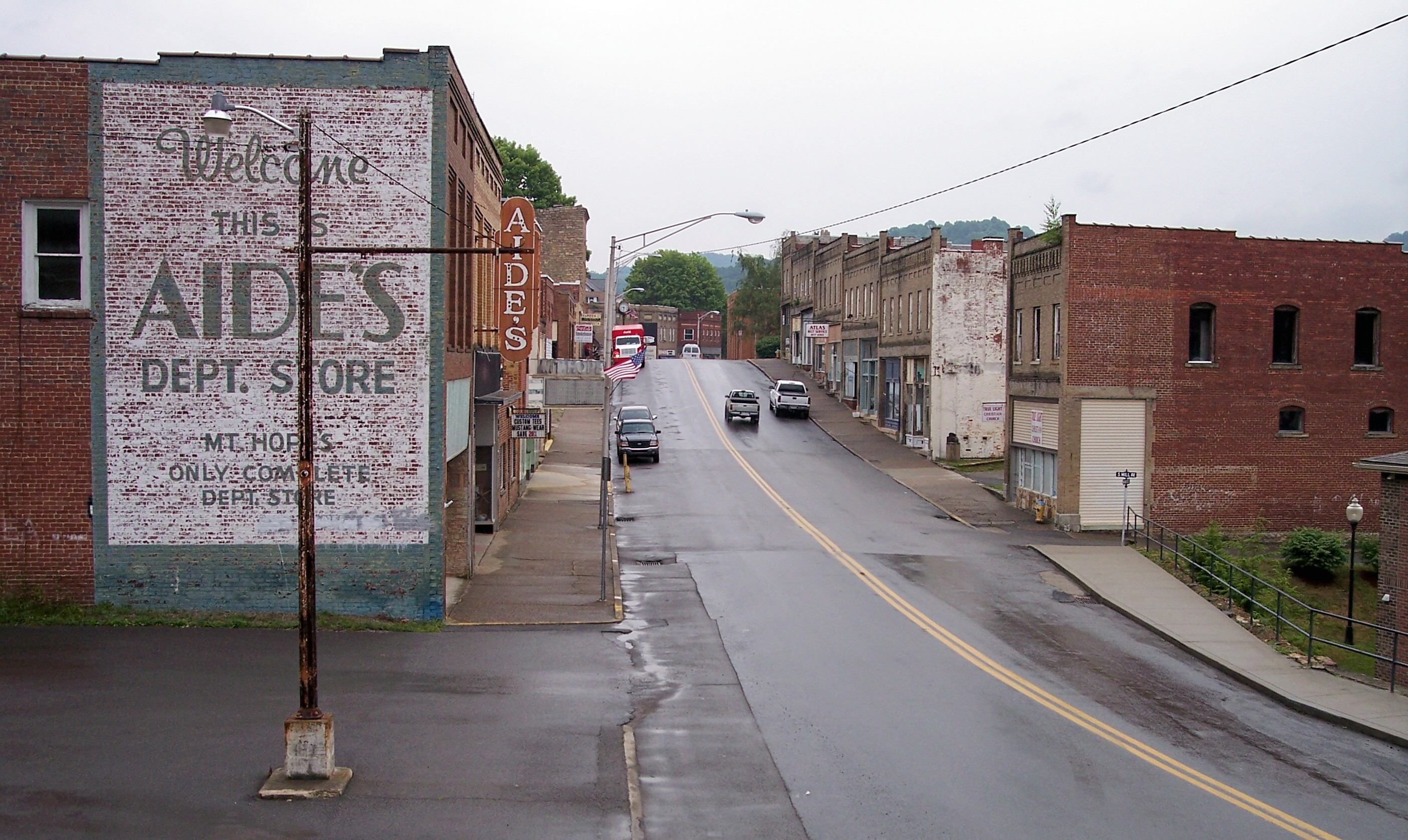
- Mount Hope, West Virginia, July 2007

- Location within West Virginia Location within the United States
- Location: Portions of Main, Tennessee, Montana, Virginia Sts., Fayette, Mountain Aves, Stadium Dr., N. Pax Ave., N. Maryland, Mount Hope, West Virginia
- Coordinates: 37°53′33″N 81°10′4″W
- Area: 58 acres (23 ha)
- Architect: Louis A. Simon, H. Rus Warne
- Architectural style: Italianate, Colonial Revival
- NRHP reference No.: 07000785
- Added to NRHP: August 3, 2007

Mount Hope Historic District is a national historic district located at Mount Hope, Fayette County, West Virginia. The district encompasses 144 contributing buildings, one contributing site, four contributing structures, and one contributing object. It includes commercial and industrial buildings; public and private institutional properties; domestic architecture; Stadium Terrace, a 1939 25-unit public housing project designed by H. Rus Warne; along with roadways; historic retaining walls; a cemetery; and the Municipal Stadium. The U. S. Post Office dates to 1940 and was designed by the Office of the Supervising Architect under Louis A. Simon. Located in the district is the previously listed New River Company General Office Building.

It was listed on the National Register of Historic Places in 2007.
