= Charleston City Hall =

- U.S. National Register of Historic Places
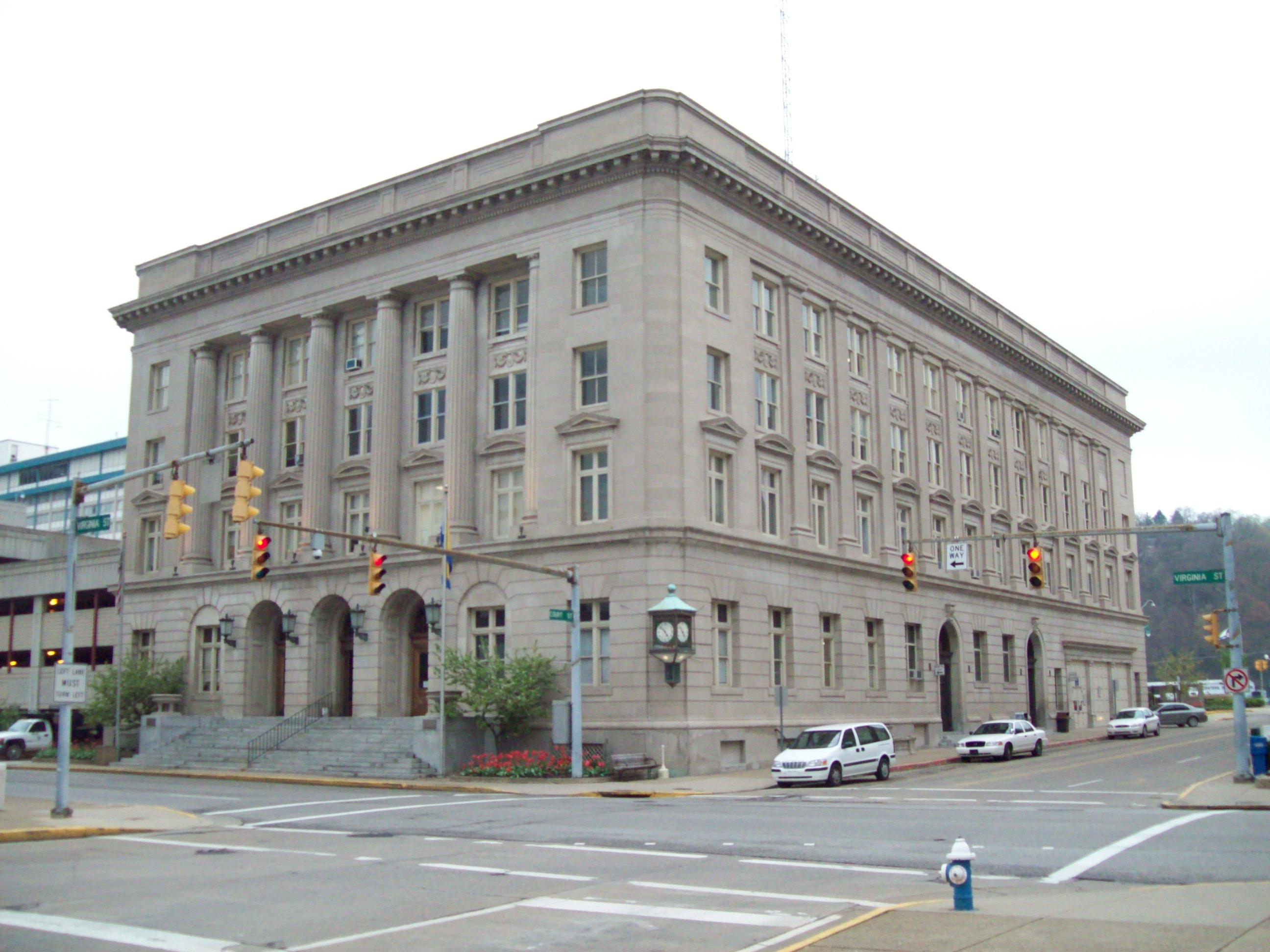
- Charleston City Hall, April 2009

- Location within West Virginia Location within the United States
- Location: Court and Virginia Sts., Charleston, West Virginia
- Coordinates: 38°21′2″N 81°38′20″W
- Built: 1921
- Architect: H. Rus Warne; Higgenbotham, A.G.
- Architectural style: Late 19th And 20th Century Revivals, Renaissance
- NRHP reference No.: 88000639
- Added to NRHP: June 06, 1988

Charleston City Hall is a historic city hall located at Charleston, West Virginia. It was constructed in 1921 in the Neoclassical style. It is located opposite the Kanawha County Courthouse, at the center of downtown Charleston. The major, or entrance, elevation faces Virginia Street with monumental design features and walls clad in smooth gray limestone. The equally impressive limestone-faced Court Street facade presents a grand prospect which runs southward for nearly a block between Virginia Street and Kanawha Boulevard. These two elevations are entirely formal in design because they were intended to face the courthouse and principal city thoroughfare. The four-story building is centered with a colossal engaged colonnade of six fluted Doric columns, which rises three-stories in support of a massive cornice. The interior features a grand entrance lobby, and classically designed stairhall and council chambers.

It was listed on the National Register of Historic Places in 1988.
