= WAXS =

- Oak Hill, West Virginia; United States
- Broadcast area: Beckley, West Virginia; Oak Hill, West Virginia; Hinton, West Virginia
- Frequency: 94.1 MHz
- Branding: Groovy 94.1

Programming
- Format: Classic hits
- Affiliations: Compass Media Networks

Ownership
- Owner: Southern Communications; (Plateau Broadcasting, Inc.)
- Sister stations: WBKW; WCIR-FM; WTNJ; WWNR

History
- First air date: 1948 (as WOAY-FM)
- Former call signs: WOAY-FM (1948–1987); WVMA (1987–1990)
- Call sign meaning: Wax, slang for records

Technical information
- Licensing authority: FCC
- Facility ID: 52789
- Class: B
- ERP: 25,500 watts
- HAAT: 198 meters
- Transmitter coordinates: 37°57′30″N 81°9′3″W

Links
- Public license information: Public file; LMS
- Webcast: Listen live
- Website: www.groovy94.com

WAXS (94.1 FM) is a classic hits formatted broadcast radio station licensed to Oak Hill, West Virginia, serving Beckley, Oak Hill, and Hinton, West Virginia. WAXS is owned and operated by Southern Communications.
