= Kanawha County Courthouse =

- U.S. National Register of Historic Places
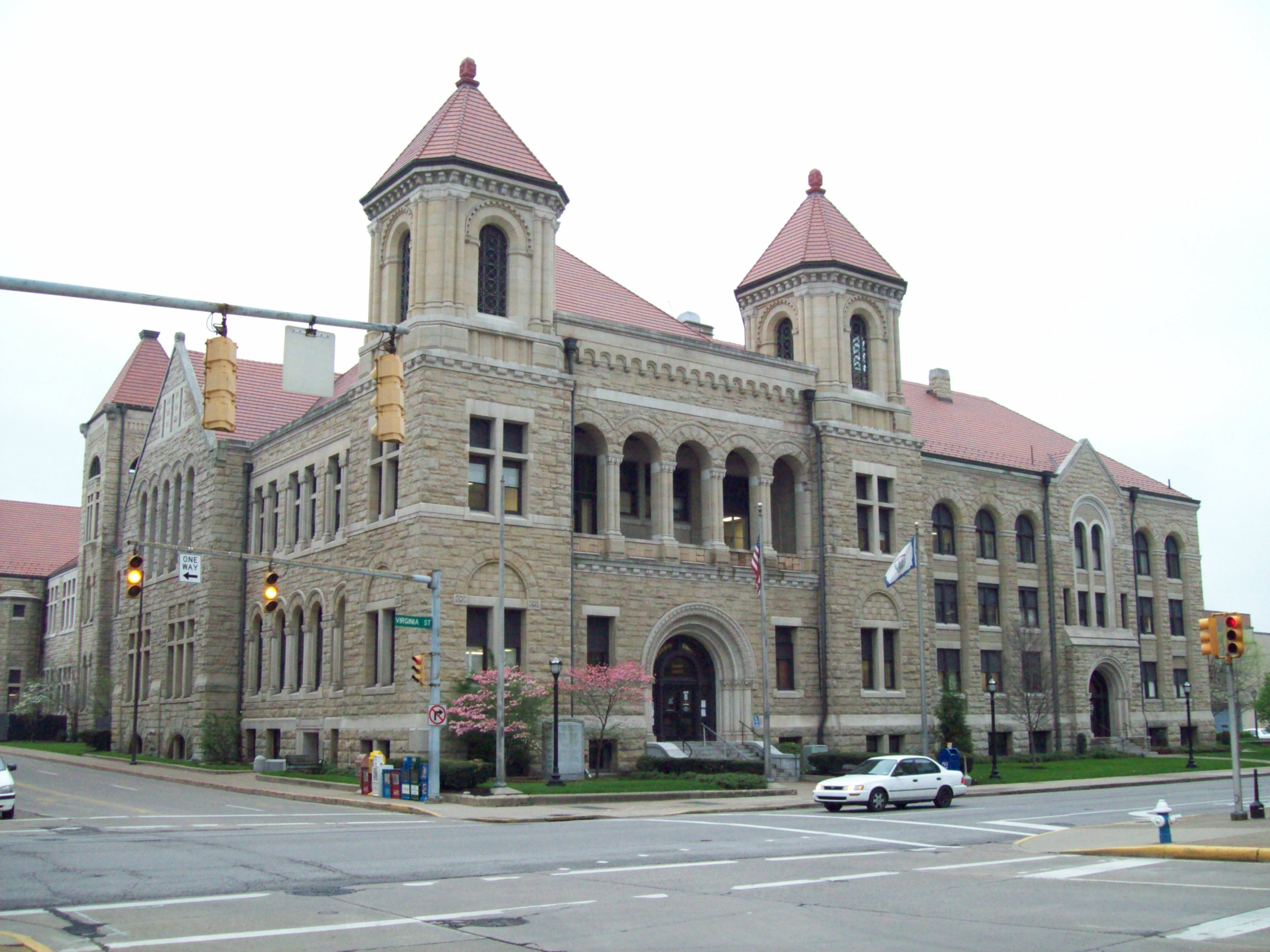
- Kanawha County Courthouse, April 2009

- Location within West Virginia Location within the United States
- Interactive map showing the location for Kanawha County Courthouse
- Location: Virginia and Court Sts., Charleston, West Virginia
- Coordinates: 38°21′3″N 81°38′22″W
- Built: 1892
- Architect: Shieff & Highnam; Warne, Tucker & Patteson
- Architectural style: Renaissance Revival, Richardsonian Romanesque
- NRHP reference No.: 78002801
- Added to NRHP: September 06, 1978

Kanawha County Courthouse is a historic courthouse located at Charleston, West Virginia. It is located across from the Charleston City Hall, and is a block-long structure constructed in 1892 of rock-face masonry.

It is noteworthy for its picturesque massing and precise Richardsonian Romanesque design.

Additions were made to the original building in 1917 and 1924. The twin-towered Virginia Street elevation is the glory of the Kanawha County Courthouse. Roofs of each tower are pyramidal with chamfered corners. The belfry openings are arched and flanked with smooth grey limestone masonry colonnettes.

It was listed on the National Register of Historic Places in 1978.
