= WCIR-FM =

- Beckley, West Virginia; United States
- Broadcast area: Southern West Virginia
- Frequency: 103.7 MHz
- Branding: 103 CIR

Programming
- Format: Contemporary Hit Radio

Ownership
- Owner: Southern Communications; (Southern Communications Corporation)
- Sister stations: WAXS, WBKW, WTNJ, WWNR

History
- First air date: 1971
- Call sign meaning: W Christianity In Radio; Christ Is Risen former format

Technical information
- Licensing authority: FCC
- Facility ID: 61273
- Class: B
- ERP: 5,000 watts
- HAAT: 452 meters
- Transmitter coordinates: 37°56′51.0″N 81°18′32.0″W

Links
- Public license information: Public file; LMS
- Webcast: Listen Live
- Website: 103cir.com

WCIR-FM (103.7 MHz) is a contemporary hit radio formatted broadcast radio station licensed to Beckley, West Virginia, United States, serving Southern West Virginia. WCIR-FM is owned and operated by Southern Communications.

== Coverage area ==
The station has an effective radiated power of 5,000 watts, but the height above average terrain of the station is 452 meters (1484 feet), meaning the station broadcasts farther than a typical 5,000 watt radio station that broadcasts at normal height. As a result, the station can be heard as far as Charleston, West Virginia.

== History ==
WCIR-FM was named after WCIR-AM (Now WBKW) in 1971. WCIR-AM was a former Christian Contemporary radio station, hence the Christianity In Radio call letter meaning. The station is owned by Southern Communications. The radio station was a religious format until 1976, when it was changed to top 40 and known as The New 103 CIR. When the station flipped formats, announcers were Shane "Southern" Randall in mornings, Danny Robins in middays, Robert "Bob" Cannon in afternoons, Andy "Jack Daniels" Ridenour in nights and Jacque Bailey doing overnights. The station reached #1 status for quite a few years with this format.
