= Beowulf: Prince of the Geats =

Beowulf: Prince of the Geats is a 2007 film based on the Anglo-Saxon epic Beowulf. The film was made by Scott Wegener on a shoestring budget with proceeds benefiting the American and Norwegian Cancer Societies. The film was shown only briefly in theaters, but that its central character was played by a Black actor generated much racist online commentary.

The film addresses issues of "colonialism and exploitation", according to Kathleen Forni. Unlike earlier film versions, the main character is played by a Black actor. Director Scott Wegener had cast the African-American actor Jayshan Jackson for the main part, and then reworked the script accordingly: in Wegener's version, Beowulf's father was a fisherman from an African people, who ended up in Northern Europe where he fathered a child with a local woman. This led to protests from neo-Nazis and other white supremacists, via email and on websites. Neo-Odinists, who consider Beowulf as equivalent to a sacred text, were offended by Wegener's choice.
