= New River Company General Office Building =

- U.S. National Register of Historic Places
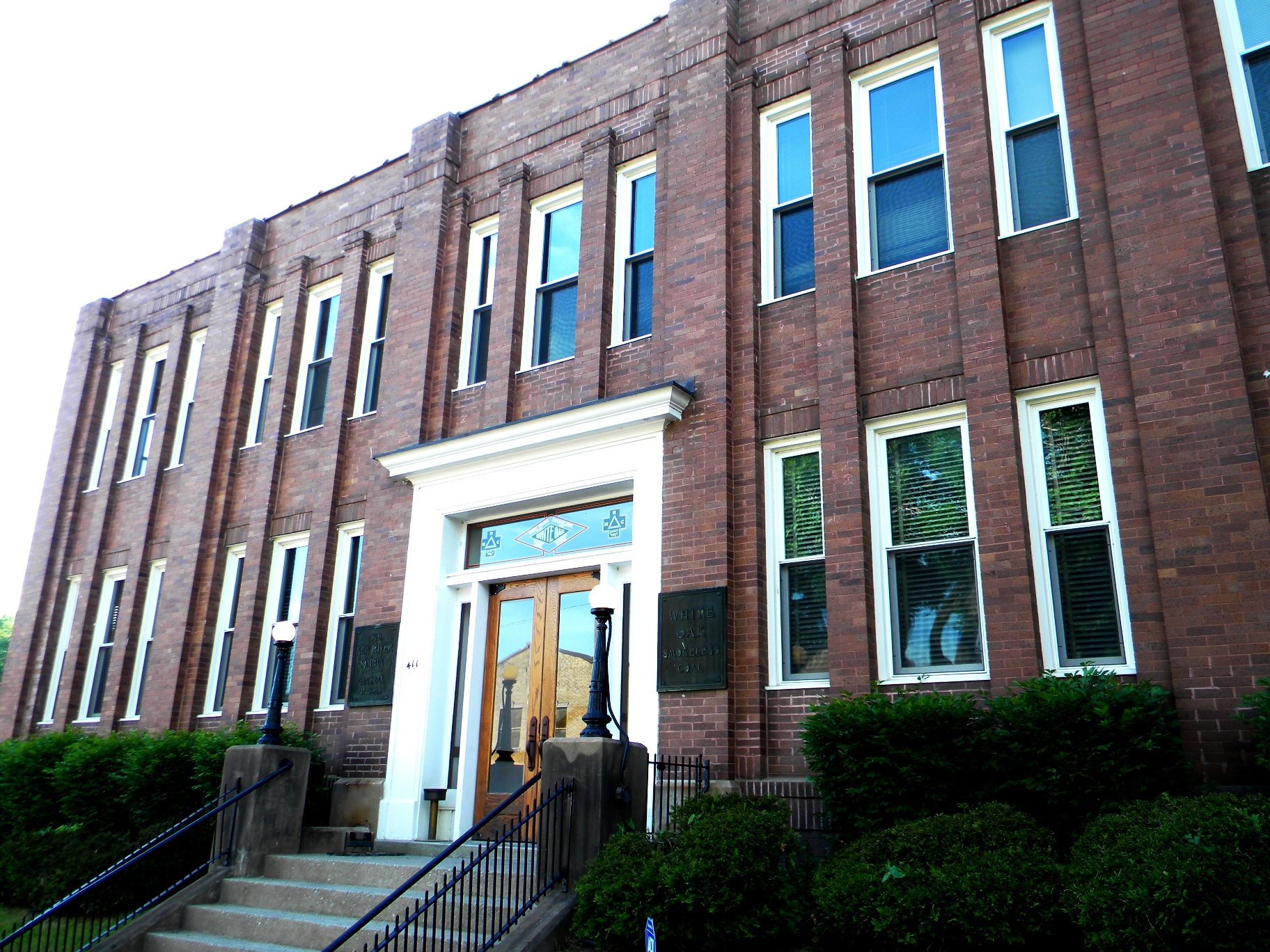

- Location within West Virginia Location within the United States
- Location: 411 Main St., Mt. Hope, West Virginia
- Coordinates: 37°53′47″N 81°9′56″W
- Area: less than one acre
- Built: 1917
- Architectural style: Early Commercial
- NRHP reference No.: 04000357
- Added to NRHP: April 21, 2004

New River Company General Office Building is a historic commercial building located at Mt. Hope, Fayette County, West Virginia. It was built in 1917, and is a two-story, U-shaped brick building. It is five bays wide. It features a stepped parapet with clay tile coping. The interior has original light fixtures, unpainted woodwork, and hardwood floors.

It was listed on the National Register of Historic Places in 2004.
