= Mount Hope, West Virginia =

City in West Virginia, US

- City
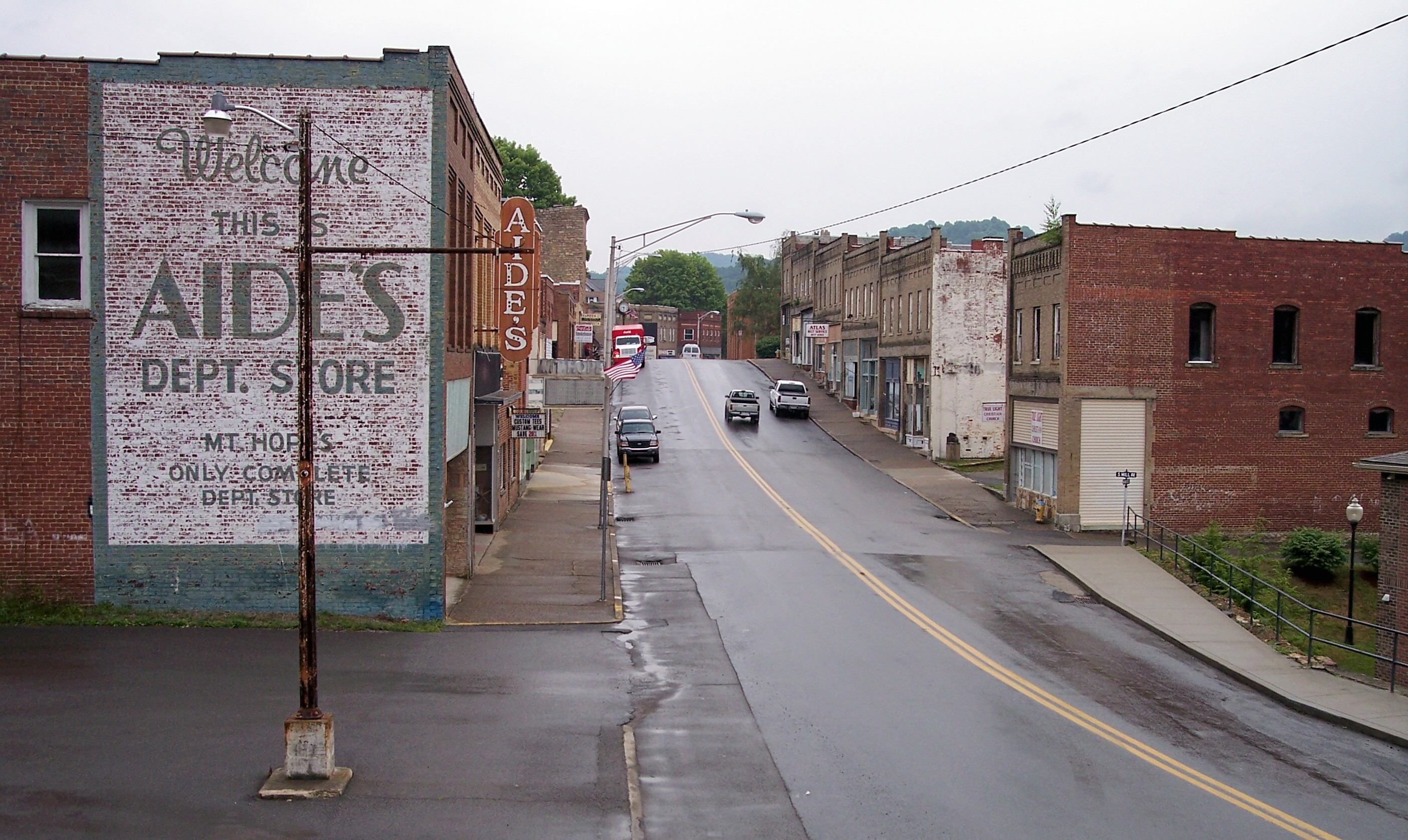
- Main Street (West Virginia Route 211) in Mount Hope in 2007

- Flag
- Motto: Gateway to the Summit
- Location of Mount Hope in Fayette County, West Virginia.
- Coordinates: 37°53′33″N 81°10′4″W
- Country: United States
- State: West Virginia
- County: Fayette
- Incorporated: 1895 (town); 1921 (city)

Government
  - Mayor: Michael Kessigner

Area
  - Total: 1.56 sq mi (4.03 km^{2})
  - Land: 1.56 sq mi (4.03 km^{2})
  - Water: 0 sq mi (0.00 km^{2})
- Elevation: 1,722 ft (525 m)

Population (2020)
  - Total: 1,125
  - Density: 818.4/sq mi (315.97/km^{2})
- Time zone: UTC-5 (Eastern (EST))
  - Summer (DST): UTC-4 (EDT)
- ZIP code: 25880
- Area code: 304
- FIPS code: 54-56404
- GNIS feature ID: 1543656
- Website: mthopewv.org

Mount Hope is a city in Fayette County, West Virginia, United States. The population was 1,125 at the 2020 census.

== History ==
Prior to the arrival of Europeans in Mount Hope, the land was used primarily by Native Americans for centuries until William Blake, Sr. became the first white settler in the area. During this time Blake built a Hotel, The Old Blake Inn, in order to house travelers and coal miners on their way through Mount Hope. Between the 1890s and 1930s, Mount Hope's population and economy were booming. Mount Hope's remoteness ended in 1894, when the Loup Creek Branch railroad line was extended into the area. A total of four mining operations opened up around the same time, spurring the growth of new housing, stores, and other businesses.

The Mount Hope Fire occurred in 1910, destroying the majority of the town, Including the Old Blake Inn, and leaving only a few buildings standing. With the help of the townspeople, Mount Hope was rebuilt. The Old Blake Inn was completely destroyed but another inn was built in its place and managed to reopen under the name "Hotel Mount Hope," and became a hot spot for the miners in the area. At this time, Mount Hope continued to prosper. But it did not last long. The population of Mount Hope started to decline due to the start of the Great Depression. Unfortunately, the town had a hard time recovering from the Depression. Hotel Mount Hope shut down and opened again as the "New River Hotel", a hotel for businessmen traveling through the town. The Hotel was completely renovated at this time and opened under yet another name "The Mountainair Hotel" but later closed again.

Today, Mount Hope's population continues to decline, leaving much of it a ghost town. The Hotel had been left vacant for some time but has since been bought and renamed the "Cottle Mountainair" by Joyce and Harvey Cottle, who have spent their time and dedication to renovate and reopen the Hotel as a space for family and community to come together. Joyce and Harvey currently rent out a room on the First floor to "Heart to Hands The Serendipity Shop", a local reiki and holistic shop that occasionally hosts events inside of the hotel.

The community took its name from the local Mount Hope School.

The Mount Hope Historic District and New River Company General Office Building are listed on the National Register of Historic Places.

== Geography ==
Mount Hope is located at 37°53′33″N 81°10′4″W (37.892595, -81.167687).

According to the United States Census Bureau, the city has a total area of 1.33 square miles (3.44 km^{2}), all land.

== The Summit ==
A parcel of land, totaling 10,600 acres (43 km^{2}) of property known locally as Garden Ground was donated by the Bechtel Foundation to the Boy Scouts of America for development into The Summit: Bechtel Family National Scout Reserve, a high adventure base and site for the national Scout jamboree.

== Demographics ==
Historical population
Census	Pop.	Note	%±
1900	351		—
1910	494		40.7%
1920	1,989		302.6%
1930	2,361		18.7%
1940	2,431		3.0%
1950	2,588		6.5%
1960	2,000		−22.7%
1970	1,829		−8.5%
1980	1,849		1.1%
1990	1,573		−14.9%
2000	1,487		−5.5%
2010	1,414		−4.9%
2020	1,125		−20.4%
U.S. Decennial Census

=== 2020 census ===
As of the 2020 census, Mount Hope had a population of 1,125. The median age was 41.1 years. 22.6% of residents were under the age of 18 and 19.6% were 65 years of age or older. For every 100 females there were 86.3 males, and for every 100 females age 18 and over there were 81.8 males.

95.1% of residents lived in urban areas, while 4.9% lived in rural areas.

There were 499 households in Mount Hope, of which 27.7% had children under the age of 18 living in them. Of all households, 30.9% were married-couple households, 21.4% were households with a male householder and no spouse or partner present, and 37.9% were households with a female householder and no spouse or partner present. About 38.2% of all households were made up of individuals and 16.2% had someone living alone who was 65 years of age or older.

There were 593 housing units, of which 15.9% were vacant. The homeowner vacancy rate was 4.7% and the rental vacancy rate was 6.2%.

Racial composition as of the 2020 census
Race	Number	Percent
White	819	72.8%
Black or African American	211	18.8%
American Indian and Alaska Native	2	0.2%
Asian	1	0.1%
Native Hawaiian and Other Pacific Islander	0	0.0%
Some other race	11	1.0%
Two or more races	81	7.2%
Hispanic or Latino (of any race)	25	2.2%

=== 2010 census ===
As of the census of 2010, there were 1,414 people, 626 households, and 362 families living in the city. The population density was 1,063.2 inhabitants per square mile (410.5/km^{2}). There were 737 housing units at an average density of 554.1 per square mile (213.9/km^{2}). The racial makeup of the city was 77.0% White, 18.0% African American, 0.5% Native American, 0.4% Asian, 0.4% from other races, and 3.7% from two or more races. Hispanic or Latino of any race were 1.6% of the population.

There were 626 households, of which 30.0% had children under the age of 18 living with them, 34.7% were married couples living together, 16.8% had a female householder with no husband present, 6.4% had a male householder with no wife present, and 42.2% were non-families. 37.1% of all households were made up of individuals, and 12% had someone living alone who was 65 years of age or older. The average household size was 2.26 and the average family size was 2.95.

The median age in the city was 37.5 years. 24.8% of residents were under the age of 18; 9.1% were between the ages of 18 and 24; 25.4% were from 25 to 44; 26.1% were from 45 to 64; and 14.6% were 65 years of age or older. The gender makeup of the city was 47.6% male and 52.4% female.

=== 2000 census ===
As of the census of 2000, there were 1,487 people, 635 households, and 419 families living in the city. The population density was 1,142.9 people per square mile (441.6/km^{2}). There were 750 housing units at an average density of 576.4 per square mile (222.8/km^{2}). The racial makeup of the city was 73.77% White, 22.33% African American, 0.34% Native American, 0.07% Asian, 0.27% Pacific Islander, 0.94% from other races, and 2.29% from two or more races. Hispanic or Latino of any race were 1.41% of the population.

There were 635 households, out of which 31.0% had children under the age of 18 living with them, 38.1% were married couples living together, 23.9% had a female householder with no husband present, and 34.0% were non-families. 30.2% of all households were made up of individuals, and 15.9% had someone living alone who was 65 years of age or older. The average household size was 2.34 and the average family size was 2.87.

In the city, the population was spread out, with 27.2% under the age of 18, 8.5% from 18 to 24, 24.6% from 25 to 44, 23.7% from 45 to 64, and 16.0% who were 65 years of age or older. The median age was 37 years. For every 100 females, there were 82.2 males. For every 100 females age 18 and over, there were 76.2 males.

The median income for a household in the city was $18,375, and the median income for a family was $23,333. Males had a median income of $25,833 versus $16,500 for females. The per capita income for the city was $11,147. About 35.1% of families and 36.0% of the population were below the poverty line, including 57.3% of those under age 18 and 7.1% of those age 65 or over.

== Notable people ==
- Bob Elkins - Character actor
- John Edward McClung - Old-time musician born here.
- Lonnie Warwick- NFL Linebacker, Minnesota Vikings, Atlanta Falcons, Washington Redskins
- Okey Patteson - former WV Governor

== See also ==
- Mount Hope High School
