= Oak Hill, West Virginia =

City in West Virginia, US

- City
- Aerial view of Oak Hill in 2026

- Logo
- Motto: The Pride of the Plateau
- Location of Oak Hill in Fayette County, West Virginia.
- Coordinates: 37°58′58″N 81°8′43″W
- Country: United States
- State: West Virginia
- County: Fayette

Government
  - Mayor: Charles H. Briscoe
  - City Manager: Tyler Bragg

Area
  - Total: 9.63 sq mi (24.94 km^{2})
  - Land: 9.61 sq mi (24.90 km^{2})
  - Water: 0.015 sq mi (0.04 km^{2})
- Elevation: 2,014 ft (614 m)

Population (2020)
  - Total: 8,179
  - Density: 850.7/sq mi (328.5/km^{2})
- Time zone: UTC-5 (Eastern (EST))
  - Summer (DST): UTC-4 (EDT)
- ZIP code: 25901
- Area code: 304
- FIPS code: 54-60028
- GNIS feature ID: 1544297
- Website: https://oakhillwv.gov

Oak Hill is a city in Fayette County, West Virginia, United States. The population was 8,179 at the 2020 census. It is part of the Beckley metropolitan area.

Country singer Hank Williams died in Oak Hill on his way to a concert on January 1, 1953. The city is also home to the historic Oak Hill Railroad Depot which still stands today as an artisan shop. More recently, recreation has become a leading industry as the city neighbors the New River Gorge National Park and Preserve.

== History ==
Oak Hill was settled in 1820. The community was so named on account of an oak tree at the elevated town site. It was incorporated as a town in 1905.

Oak Hill is the supposed place of death of Hank Williams. According to his driver Charles Carr, they had stopped at a gas station in Oak Hill and found Williams dead in the backseat. On March 26, 2016, the city was honored with a historical marker to pay tribute to Williams' memory.

== Geography ==
Oak Hill is located at 37°58′58″N 81°8′43″W (37.982775, -81.145334).

According to the United States Census Bureau, the city has a total area of 4.89 square miles (12.67 km^{2}), of which 4.88 square miles (12.64 km^{2}) is land and 0.01 square miles (0.03 km^{2}) is water.

=== Climate ===
Climate data for Oak Hill, West Virginia (1991–2020 normals, extremes 1941–2012)
Month	Jan	Feb	Mar	Apr	May	Jun	Jul	Aug	Sep	Oct	Nov	Dec	Year
Record high °F (°C)	74 (23)	76 (24)	86 (30)	89 (32)	92 (33)	95 (35)	99 (37)	98 (37)	98 (37)	93 (34)	85 (29)	79 (26)	99 (37)
Mean maximum °F (°C)	62.8 (17.1)	65.9 (18.8)	73.8 (23.2)	81.7 (27.6)	83.5 (28.6)	86.9 (30.5)	88.7 (31.5)	88.8 (31.6)	85.7 (29.8)	78.8 (26.0)	73.7 (23.2)	63.4 (17.4)	90.0 (32.2)
Mean daily maximum °F (°C)	40.7 (4.8)	44.2 (6.8)	52.3 (11.3)	64.3 (17.9)	71.5 (21.9)	78.5 (25.8)	81.3 (27.4)	80.6 (27.0)	75.4 (24.1)	65.2 (18.4)	54.2 (12.3)	44.6 (7.0)	62.7 (17.1)
Daily mean °F (°C)	31.8 (−0.1)	34.4 (1.3)	41.7 (5.4)	52.7 (11.5)	60.6 (15.9)	68.0 (20.0)	71.3 (21.8)	70.4 (21.3)	64.8 (18.2)	53.8 (12.1)	43.8 (6.6)	35.8 (2.1)	52.4 (11.3)
Mean daily minimum °F (°C)	22.8 (−5.1)	24.6 (−4.1)	31.2 (−0.4)	41.0 (5.0)	49.7 (9.8)	57.6 (14.2)	61.3 (16.3)	60.3 (15.7)	54.2 (12.3)	42.4 (5.8)	33.4 (0.8)	27.0 (−2.8)	42.1 (5.6)
Mean minimum °F (°C)	1.6 (−16.9)	7.3 (−13.7)	15.2 (−9.3)	25.0 (−3.9)	34.0 (1.1)	43.8 (6.6)	50.5 (10.3)	49.7 (9.8)	38.1 (3.4)	27.3 (−2.6)	19.4 (−7.0)	7.3 (−13.7)	−2.7 (−19.3)
Record low °F (°C)	−20 (−29)	−11 (−24)	−5 (−21)	13 (−11)	24 (−4)	33 (1)	40 (4)	39 (4)	26 (−3)	13 (−11)	0 (−18)	−15 (−26)	−20 (−29)
Average precipitation inches (mm)	3.48 (88)	3.28 (83)	4.18 (106)	4.18 (106)	5.13 (130)	5.55 (141)	4.61 (117)	4.14 (105)	3.66 (93)	2.87 (73)	2.93 (74)	3.85 (98)	47.86 (1,216)
Average snowfall inches (cm)	12.4 (31)	10.0 (25)	7.6 (19)	1.3 (3.3)	0.0 (0.0)	0.0 (0.0)	0.0 (0.0)	0.0 (0.0)	0.0 (0.0)	0.0 (0.0)	1.9 (4.8)	9.6 (24)	42.8 (109)
Average precipitation days (≥ 0.01 in)	15.5	13.0	14.4	13.3	14.5	12.2	12.7	10.1	9.2	9.1	10.9	13.9	148.8
Average snowy days (≥ 0.1 in)	7.2	5.0	2.5	0.8	0.0	0.0	0.0	0.0	0.0	0.0	0.9	5.1	21.5
Source: NOAA (mean maxima/minima, snow/snow days 1981–2010)

== Demographics ==
Historical population
Census	Pop.	Note	%±
1910	764		—
1920	1,037		35.7%
1930	2,076		100.2%
1940	3,213		54.8%
1950	4,518		40.6%
1960	4,711		4.3%
1970	4,738		0.6%
1980	7,120		50.3%
1990	6,812		−4.3%
2000	7,589		11.4%
2010	7,730		1.9%
2020	8,179		5.8%
U.S. Decennial Census

=== 2020 census ===
As of the 2020 census, Oak Hill had a population of 8,179. The median age was 42.5 years. 23.3% of residents were under the age of 18 and 21.4% of residents were 65 years of age or older. For every 100 females there were 86.8 males, and for every 100 females age 18 and over there were 82.5 males age 18 and over.

94.8% of residents lived in urban areas, while 5.2% lived in rural areas.

There were 3,543 households in Oak Hill, of which 28.2% had children under the age of 18 living in them. Of all households, 38.3% were married-couple households, 17.5% were households with a male householder and no spouse or partner present, and 36.3% were households with a female householder and no spouse or partner present. About 34.0% of all households were made up of individuals and 16.9% had someone living alone who was 65 years of age or older.

There were 3,953 housing units, of which 10.4% were vacant. The homeowner vacancy rate was 1.9% and the rental vacancy rate was 6.0%.

Racial composition as of the 2020 census
Race	Number	Percent
White	7,126	87.1%
Black or African American	448	5.5%
American Indian and Alaska Native	28	0.3%
Asian	37	0.5%
Native Hawaiian and Other Pacific Islander	0	0.0%
Some other race	56	0.7%
Two or more races	484	5.9%
Hispanic or Latino (of any race)	157	1.9%

=== 2010 census ===
As of the census of 2010, there were 7,730 people, 3,398 households, and 2,085 families living in the city. The population density was 1,584.0 inhabitants per square mile (611.6/km^{2}). There were 3,703 housing units at an average density of 758.8 per square mile (293.0/km^{2}). The racial makeup of the city was 93.3% White, 4.3% African American, 0.3% Native American, 0.2% Asian, 0.2% from other races, and 1.6% from two or more races. Hispanic or Latino of any race were 1.2% of the population.

There were 3,398 households, of which 27.9% had children under the age of 18 living with them, 42.1% were married couples living together, 13.8% had a female householder with no husband present, 5.4% had a male householder with no wife present, and 38.6% were non-families. 34.8% of all households were made up of individuals, and 16.4% had someone living alone who was 65 years of age or older. The average household size was 2.22 and the average family size was 2.84.

The median age in the city was 43.3 years. 21.2% of residents were under the age of 18; 7.3% were between the ages of 18 and 24; 23.8% were from 25 to 44; 28.7% were from 45 to 64; and 19% were 65 years of age or older. The gender makeup of the city was 46.8% male and 53.2% female.

=== 2000 census ===
As of the census of 2000, there were 7,589 people, 3,297 households, and 2,123 families living in the city. The population density was 1,570.9 people per square mile (606.7/km^{2}). There were 3,619 housing units at an average density of 749.1 per square mile (289.3/km^{2}). The racial makeup of the city was 93.02% White, 4.80% African American, 0.32% Native American, 0.42% Asian, 0.03% Pacific Islander, 0.24% from other races, and 1.19% from two or more races. Hispanic or Latino of any race were 0.84% of the population.

There were 3,297 households, out of which 27.0% had children under the age of 18 living with them, 47.1% were married couples living together, 13.8% had a female householder with no husband present, and 35.6% were non-families. 31.7% of all households were made up of individuals, and 16.2% had someone living alone who was 65 years of age or older. The average household size was 2.25 and the average family size was 2.80.

The age distribution was 20.5% under the age of 18, 8.5% from 18 to 24, 26.0% from 25 to 44, 24.7% from 45 to 64, and 20.4% who were 65 years of age or older. The median age was 42 years. For every 100 females, there were 87.9 males. For every 100 females age 18 and over, there were 81.8 males.

The median income for a household in the city was $24,792, and the median income for a family was $33,183. Males had a median income of $27,595 versus $18,760 for females. The per capita income for the city was $14,347. About 14.8% of families and 17.7% of the population were below the poverty line, including 27.9% of those under age 18 and 11.9% of those age 65 or over.

== Economy ==
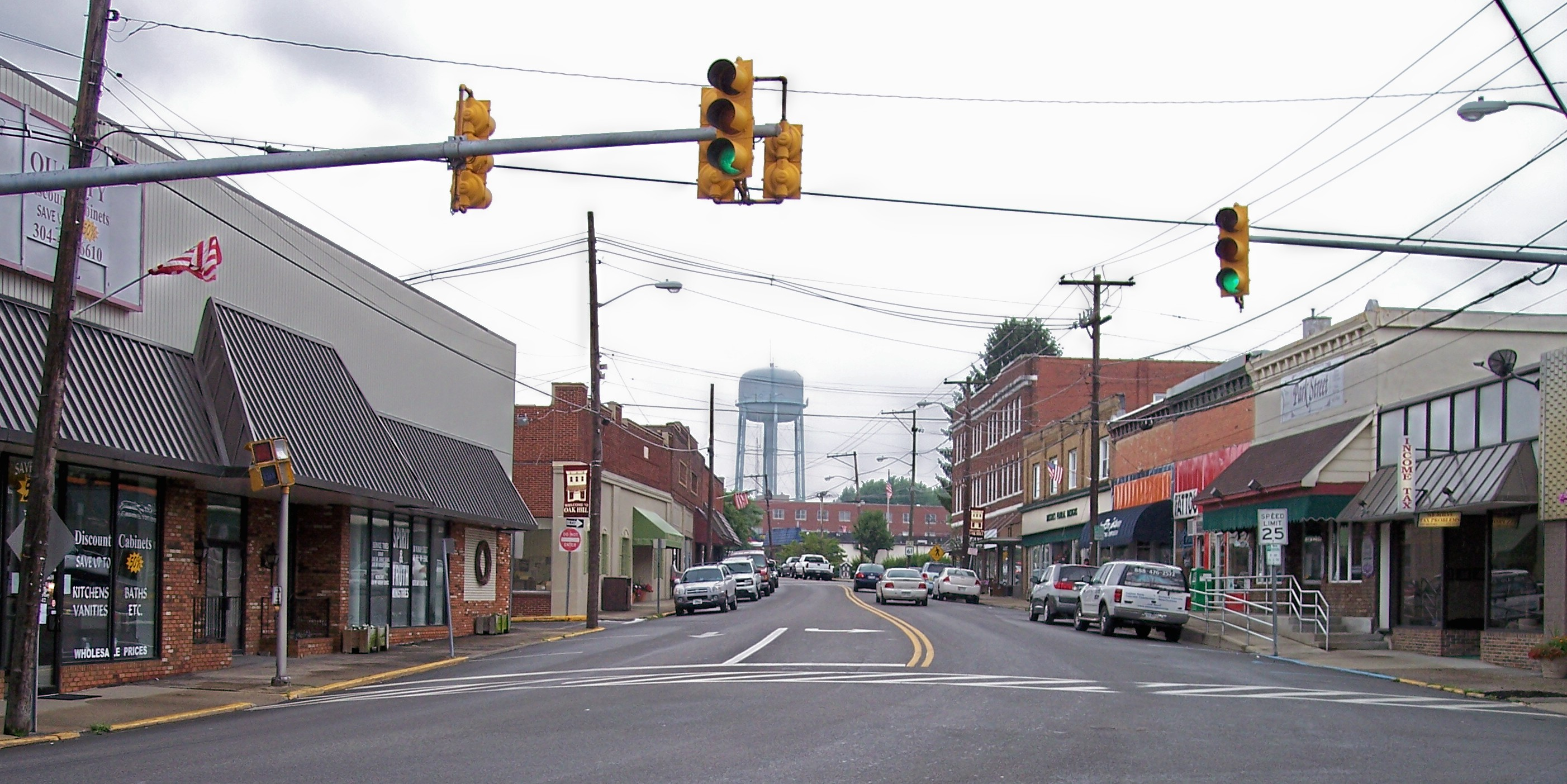
Main Street (West Virginia Route 16) in downtown Oak Hill in 2007

Oak Hill is located in West Virginia's southern coalfields and, as such, coal mining has played a primary role in the area's employment. Oak Hill also has a light manufacturing base, and serves as a health-care hub for Fayette County, including CAMC Plateau Medical Center and various physician offices affiliated with the Charleston Area Medical Center group.

== Parks and recreation ==
Oak Hill is home to several rafting companies, adventure resorts, and parks. Located near the New River Gorge National Park and Preserve, Oak Hill has a variety of outdoor and recreational activities. In June 2022, Governor Jim Justice unveiled a new route on The WV Rides program in which runs through Route 16 in Oak Hill.

- Needles Eye Park
- Oak Hill City Park
- Collins Park and Disc Golf course
- Russel E. Matthews Park at Harlem Heights
- Doc Hamilton Dog Park
- The Lively Family Amphitheater

== Government ==
Oak Hill uses a city council consisting of eight members including the mayor. The city also employs a city manager to assist in organizing its day-to-day operations. As of 2023, the current mayor of Oak Hill is Charles H. Briscoe and the current city manager is Tyler Bragg.

== Education ==
Public Schools: New River Intermediate School, New River Primary School, Oak Hill Middle School, Oak Hill High School, Fayette Institute of Technology

Private Schools: St. Peter & Paul Catholic School Mountain View Christian School

== Notable people ==
- Randy Gilkey, American singer, songwriter, multi-instrumentalist, producer and recording engineer (born in Oak Hill)
- Earl Jones, former professional basketball player (born in Oak Hill)
- Charlie McCoy, session musician and multi-instrumentalist.
