= New River Gorge Bridge =

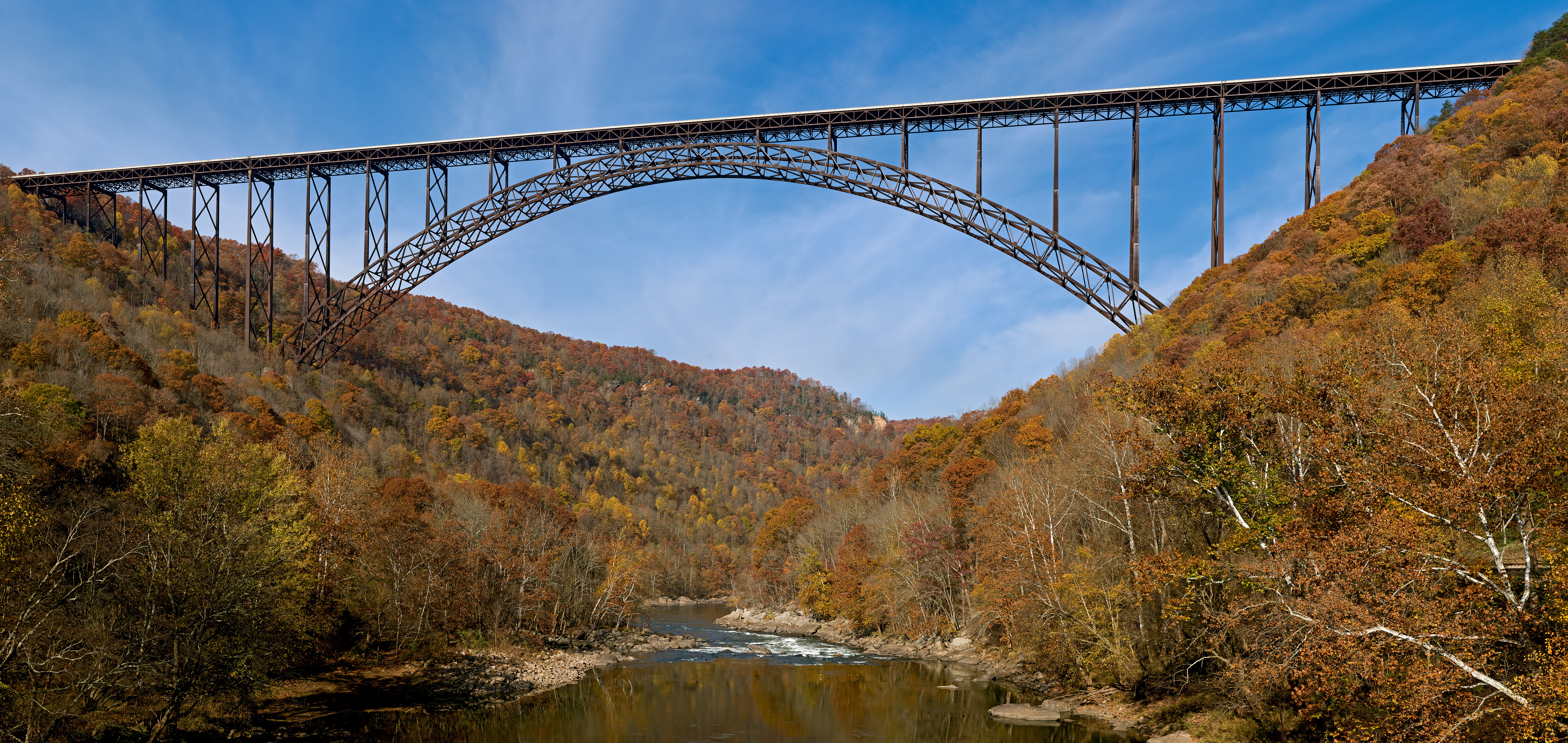
- Coordinates: 38°4.1′N 81°5.0′W
- Carries: US 19
- Crosses: New River, CR 82, CSX Transportation
- Locale: Fayette County, West Virginia, U.S.
- Maintained by: West Virginia Division of Highways

Characteristics
- Design: Arch
- Total length: 3,030 ft (924 m)
- Width: 69.3 ft (21.1 m), 4 lanes with center divider
- Height: 876 ft (267 m)
- Longest span: 1,700 ft (518.2 m)
- Clearance above: Deck arch, unlimited clearance

History
- Construction cost: $37 million (equivalent to $149 million in 2024 dollars)
- Opened: October 22, 1977

Statistics
- Daily traffic: 16,200 vehicles/day
- New River Gorge Bridge
- U.S. National Register of Historic Places
- Location within West Virginia
- NRHP reference No.: 13000603
- Added to NRHP: August 14, 2013

Location
- Interactive map of New River Gorge Bridge

The New River Gorge Bridge is a steel arch bridge 3,030 feet (924 m) long over the New River Gorge near Fayetteville, West Virginia, in the Appalachian Mountains of the eastern United States. With an arch 1,700 feet (518 m) long, the New River Gorge Bridge was the world's longest single-span arch bridge for 26 years; it is now the seventh longest and the longest outside of China. Part of U.S. Route 19, its construction marked the completion of Corridor L of the Appalachian Development Highway System. An average of 16,200 motor vehicles cross the bridge each day.

The roadway of the New River Gorge Bridge is 876 feet (267 m) above the New River, making the bridge one of the highest vehicular bridges in the world; it is the third highest in the United States. When completed in 1977, it was the world's highest bridge carrying a regular roadway, a title it held until the 2001 opening of the Liuguanghe Bridge in China. Because of its height, the bridge has attracted daredevils since its construction. It is now the centerpiece of the annual "Bridge Day", during which hundreds of people, with appropriate equipment, are permitted to climb on or jump from the bridge. In 2005, the structure gained additional attention when the U.S. Mint issued the West Virginia state quarter with the bridge depicted on one side. In 2013, the bridge was listed on the National Register of Historic Places.

== History ==
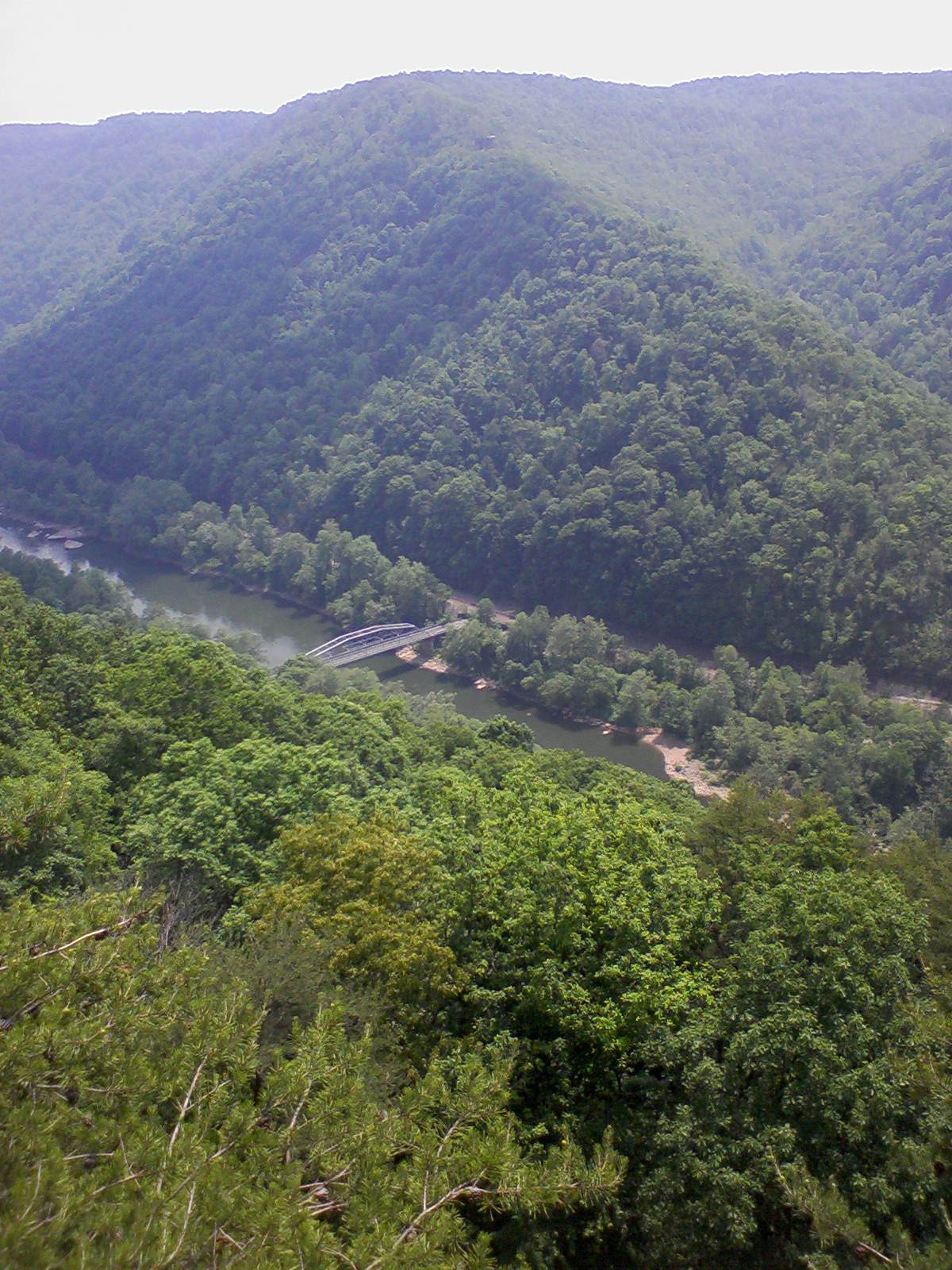
The Fayette Station Bridge over the New River, over 800 ft (244 m) below the canyon rim

West Virginia is known for its success in the coal mining industry. In the 1870s the construction of the Chesapeake and Ohio Railway led to the increase of mining towns in the New River gorge area. These towns thrived for years bringing in many Americans to work. However, with the automation of coal mining, there was less of a need for employees in coal mines. This led to the thriving coal towns becoming ghost towns. Unemployment in the area skyrocketed and the economy became one of the worst in the United States.

The Federal Government decided to get involved and created the Appalachian Regional Commission (ARC) to try and recover the economy of the New River Gorge region, specifically Fayette County. Many people saw the tourist opportunities in the area because of the scenery and decided that this would be the best way to rebuild the economy of the region. One of the main things needed to increase tourism was a viable transportation route to the area. This led to the project known as Corridor L (Route 19), which the New River Gorge Bridge is a part of.

Before the bridge was constructed, Route 60 was the only way to the inside of Fayette County. The mountainous terrain made it almost impossible to cross the entire county in a timely manner. Across the gorge itself was one bridge, the Fayette Station Bridge, which was only one lane. On either side of the gorge was the long and winding Route 60. This poor infrastructure decreased tourism because of the time it took to travel across the gorge.

Corridor L aimed to cut the time it took to travel to the region. It was funded both by the state and the ARC. It would be four lanes connecting the West Virginia Turnpike in the south with I-79 to the north. The last piece of the Corridor was the bridge which was going to be the most challenging part of the project.

Construction began on the bridge in June 1974, and was completed on October 22, 1977. The bridge was designed by the Michael Baker Company under the direction of Chief Engineer Clarence V. Knudsen and Corporate Bridge Engineer Frank J. Kempf, and executed by U.S. Steel's American Bridge Division. The final cost of construction was $37 million (equivalent to $149 million in 2024 dollars). It was approximately $4 million, or $16 million in 2024 dollars, over bid. It is made from COR-TEN steel. The use of COR-TEN in construction presented several challenges; notable among them was ensuring that the weld points weathered at the same rate as the rest of the steel. Unfortunately, one death accorded in the construction along with other injuries when the cable towers collapsed.

At the time, the bridge was the West Virginia Department of Highways' largest project in its history, important both in terms of its overall cost, and that the federal government provided 70 percent of the funding. Construction gave a boost to the state and local economy; completion improved transportation. The bridge cut the vehicle travel time from one side of the gorge to the other from about 45 minutes to 45 seconds.

On August 14, 2013, the bridge was listed on the National Register of Historic Places. Even though it was not yet 50 years old, it was listed for its exceptional impact on local transportation and its engineering significance.

== Tourism ==
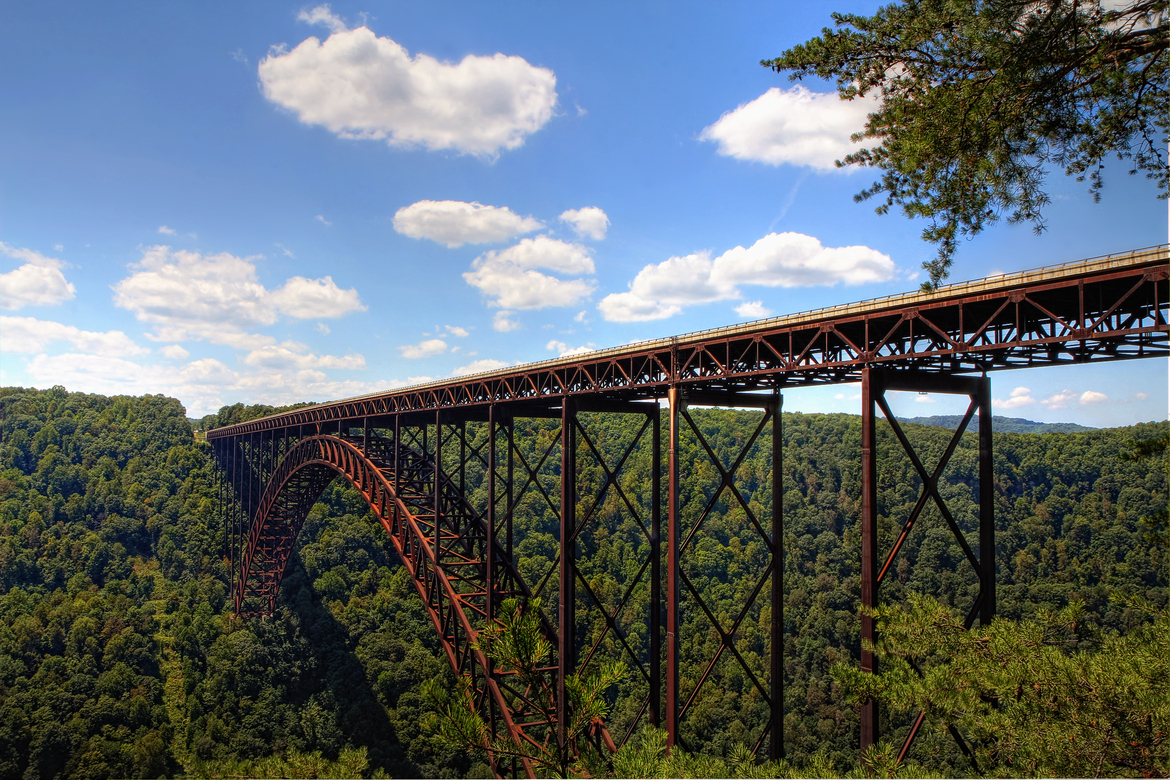
View of the New River Gorge Bridge from the National Park Service Overlook

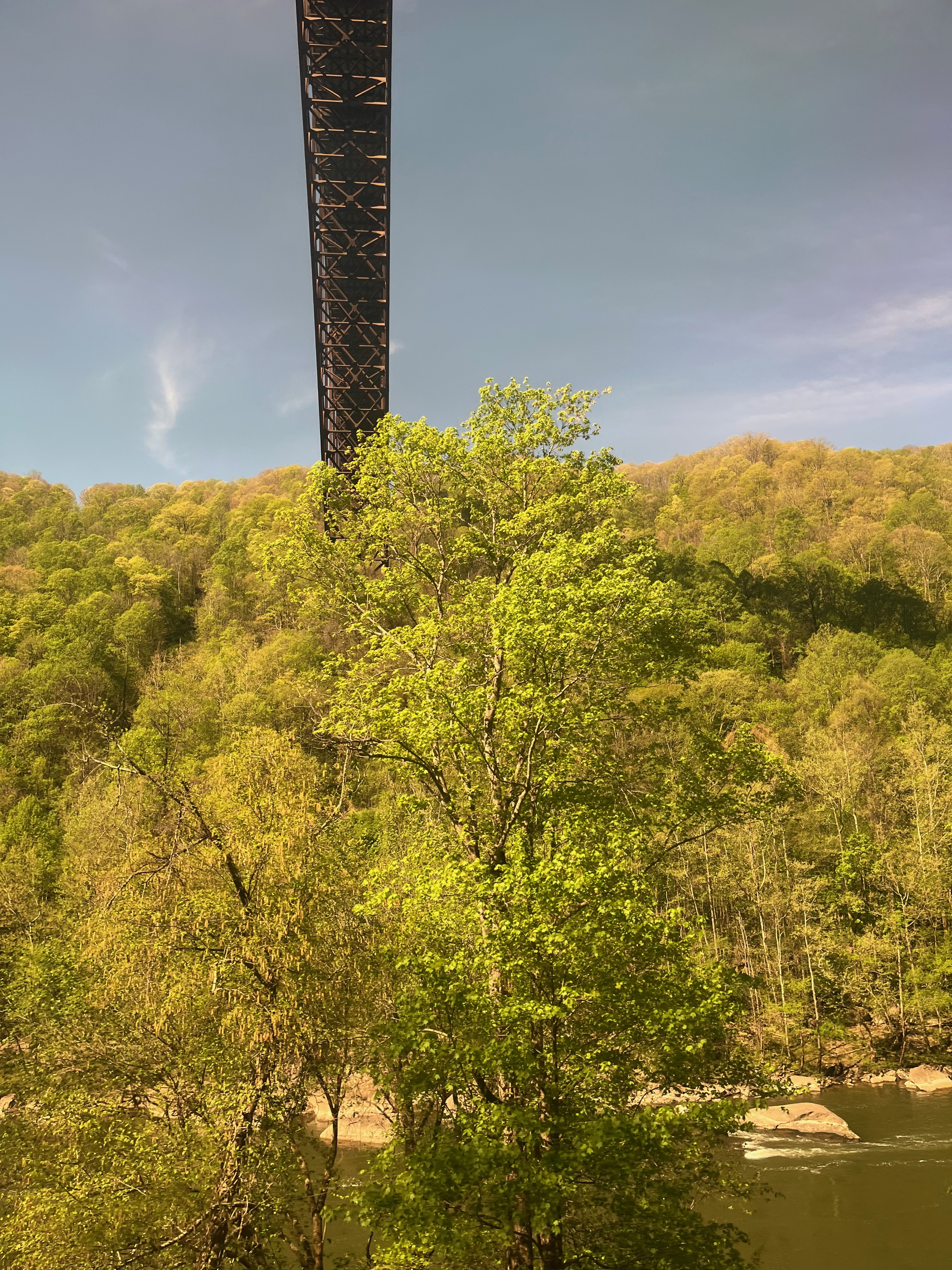
View of the bridge from an Amtrak Cardinal train below it in 2025

The New River Gorge Bridge is within the National Park Service's New River Gorge National Park and Preserve, which protects this portion of the New River Gorge. At the northern end of the bridge, the Park Service operates a visitor center; it has scenic overlooks and a staircase that descends part of the way into the gorge.

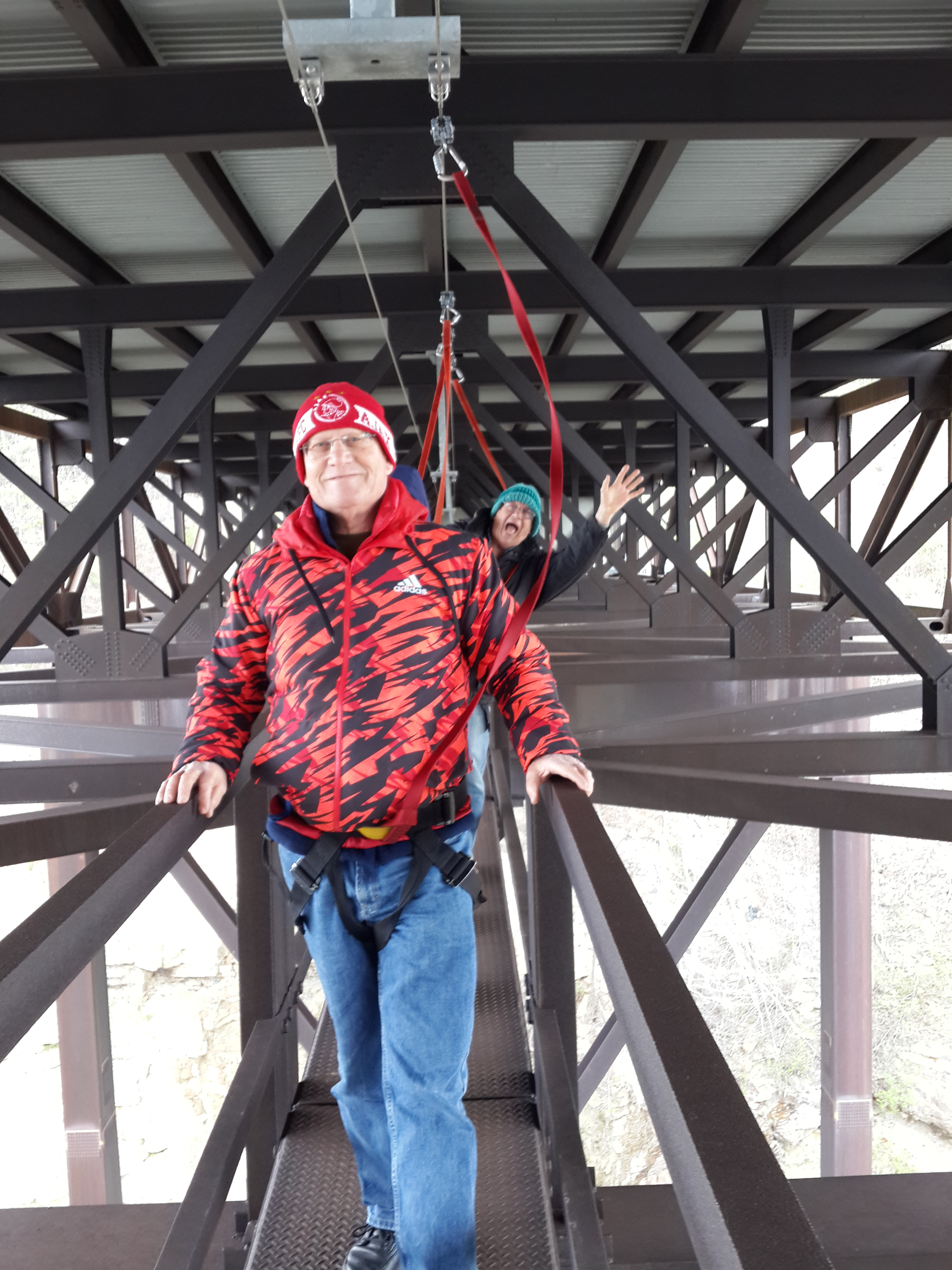
"A steel catwalk two feet (60 cm) wide runs the full length of the bridge underneath the roadway also open for guided quarter-mile "Bridge Walk" tours; visitors use safety rigging" (from the text).

A steel catwalk two feet (60 cm) wide runs the full length of the bridge underneath the roadway. Originally built to facilitate inspections, the catwalk is open for guided, handicapped-accessible quarter mile "Bridge Walk" tours; visitors use safety rigging.

Since its opening, the bridge has been the centerpiece of Fayette County's "Bridge Day," held the third Saturday of every October. This festival includes demonstrations of rappelling, ascending, and BASE jumping. Bungee jumping, however, has been banned during Bridge Day since 1993.

The bridge is closed to vehicular traffic during the festival. Prior to the September 11 terrorist attacks, two of the bridge's four lanes were open to traffic during the festivals. Since 2001, security concerns have caused the entire span to be closed to vehicles during these events.

The first person to jump off the New River Gorge Bridge was Burton Ervin, who lives in Cowen, West Virginia, and was a coal-mine foreman. Burton jumped on August 1, 1979, using a conventional parachute. Four BASE jumpers have died at the bridge, three of these during Bridge Day festivals.

Probably because of its height (and lack of barriers), the bridge has regularly attracted suicide jumpers.

== National Park Status ==
After the construction of Corridor L, some believed that the area should be totally built up to support the local economy. This included building large resorts along the gorge like those seen in North Carolina. However, others disagreed and wanted the gorge to remain a natural, undeveloped area. Those favoring leaving the area in its natural state eventually won when Congress designated the area a national river on November 10, 1978, protecting the river from any further destruction.

The New River Gorge became the newest national park in the United States in 2020 after decades of destruction to the natural landscape. The national park is different from many others in that it was settled by European Americans before it became a protected area along with its main feature being man-made and not natural: the New River Gorge Bridge. This is different from most other national parks (excluding, for example, Mesa Verde National Park and Gateway Arch National Park) that have largely been recognized for their natural features rather than man-made structures. The New River Gorge Bridge is one of the many attractions in the park along with stunning views, white-water rafting, rock climbing, fishing, camping, and hiking.

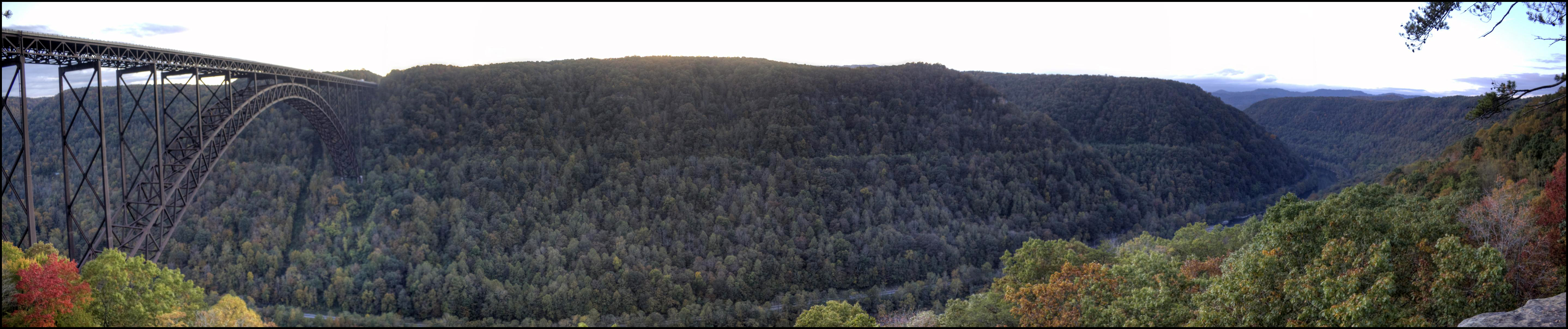
Panorama of the New River Gorge Bridge

== Popular culture ==
- New River Gorge Bridge is a location in the game Fallout 76
- Featured in 2002 film Steal.

== Gallery ==
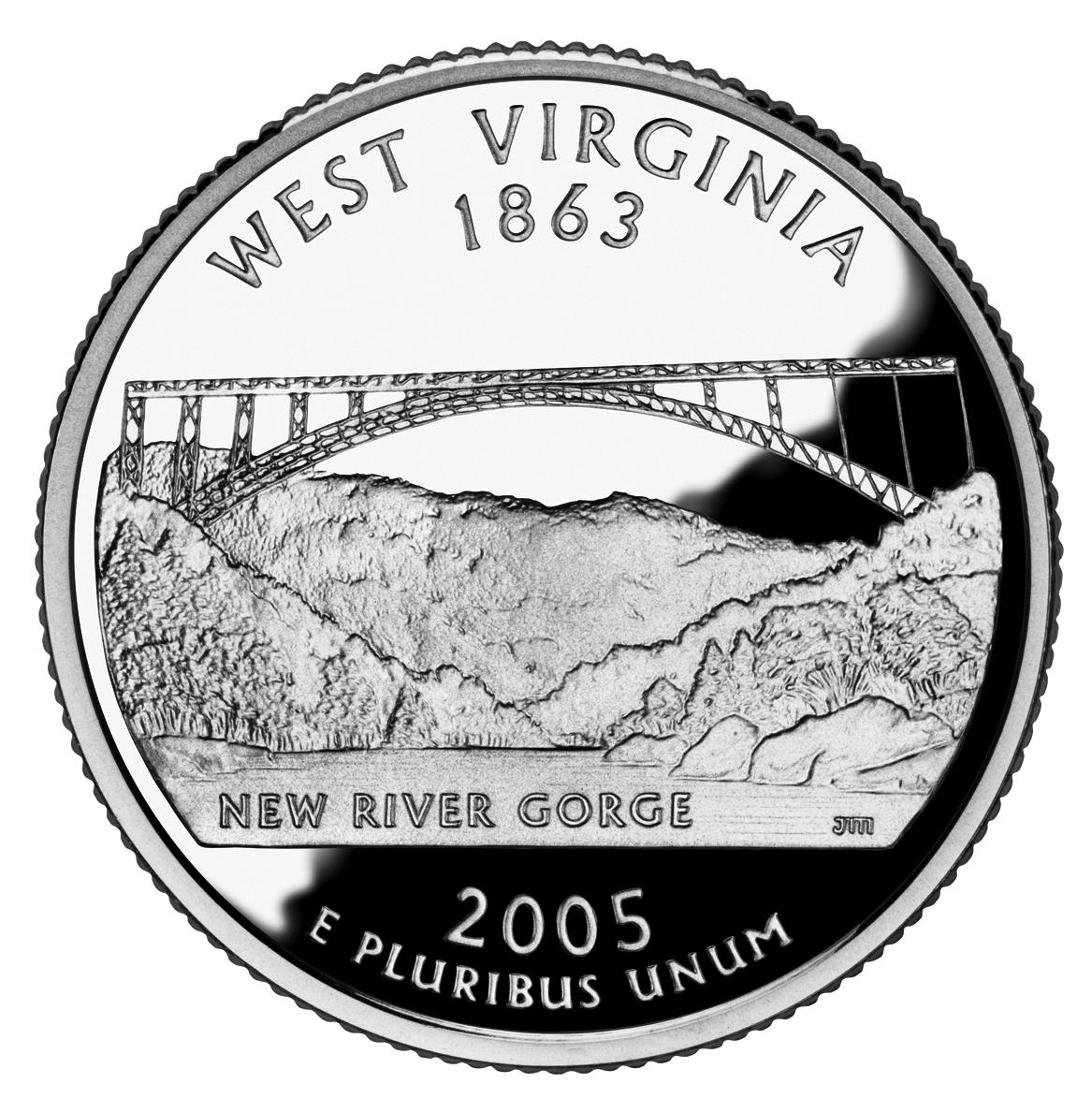
The West Virginia state quarter, released in 2005, features the New River Gorge Bridge.

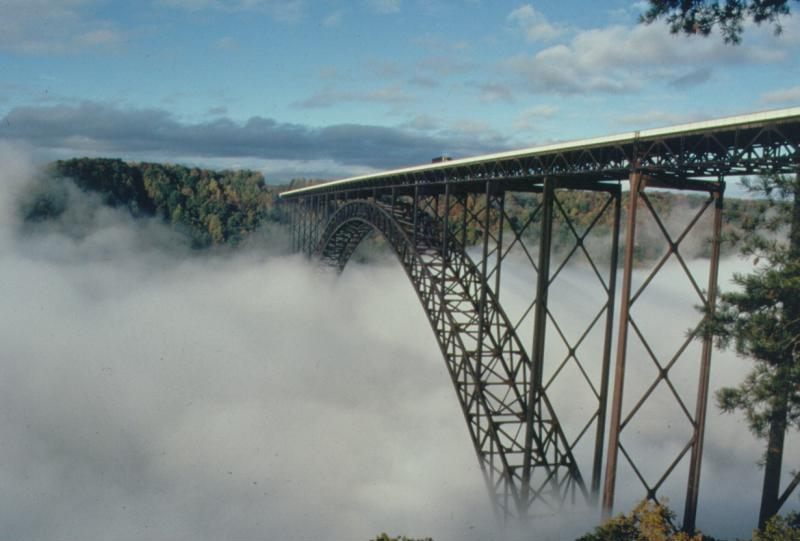
Bridge as seen from the National Park Service Visitors Center, with fog in the New River Gorge below

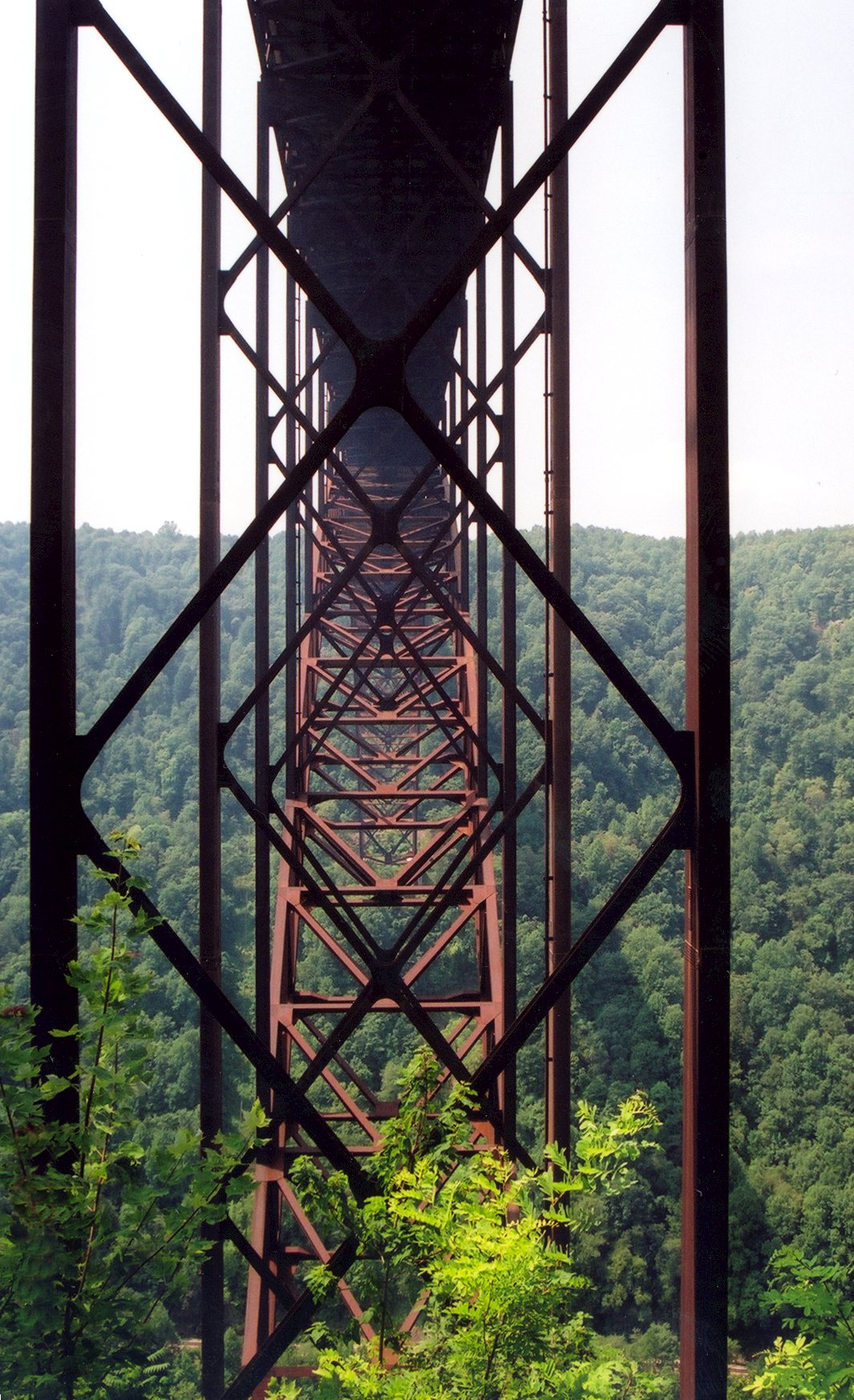
Close-up of the bridge supports

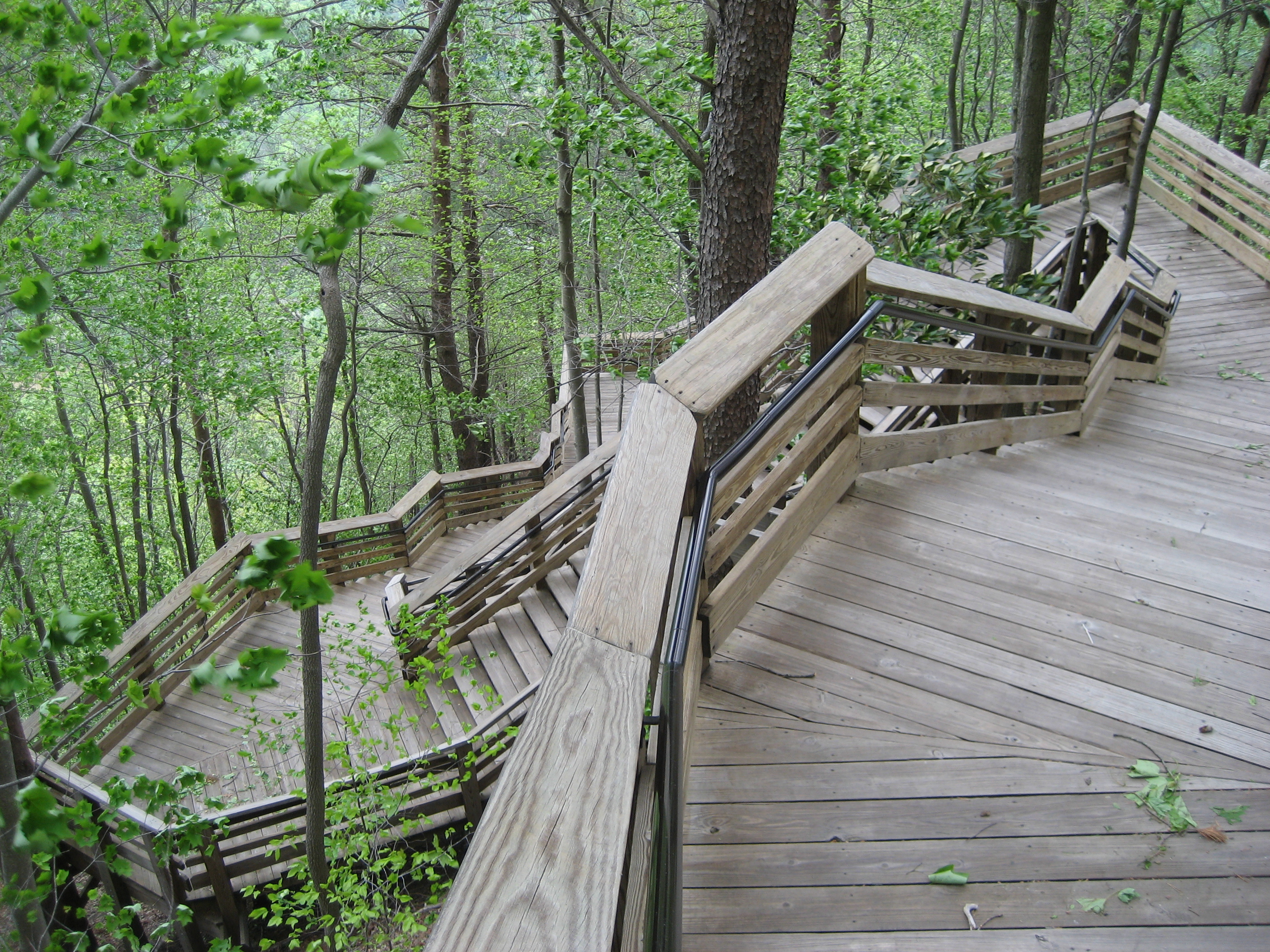
Walkway to observation area near the Visitors Center

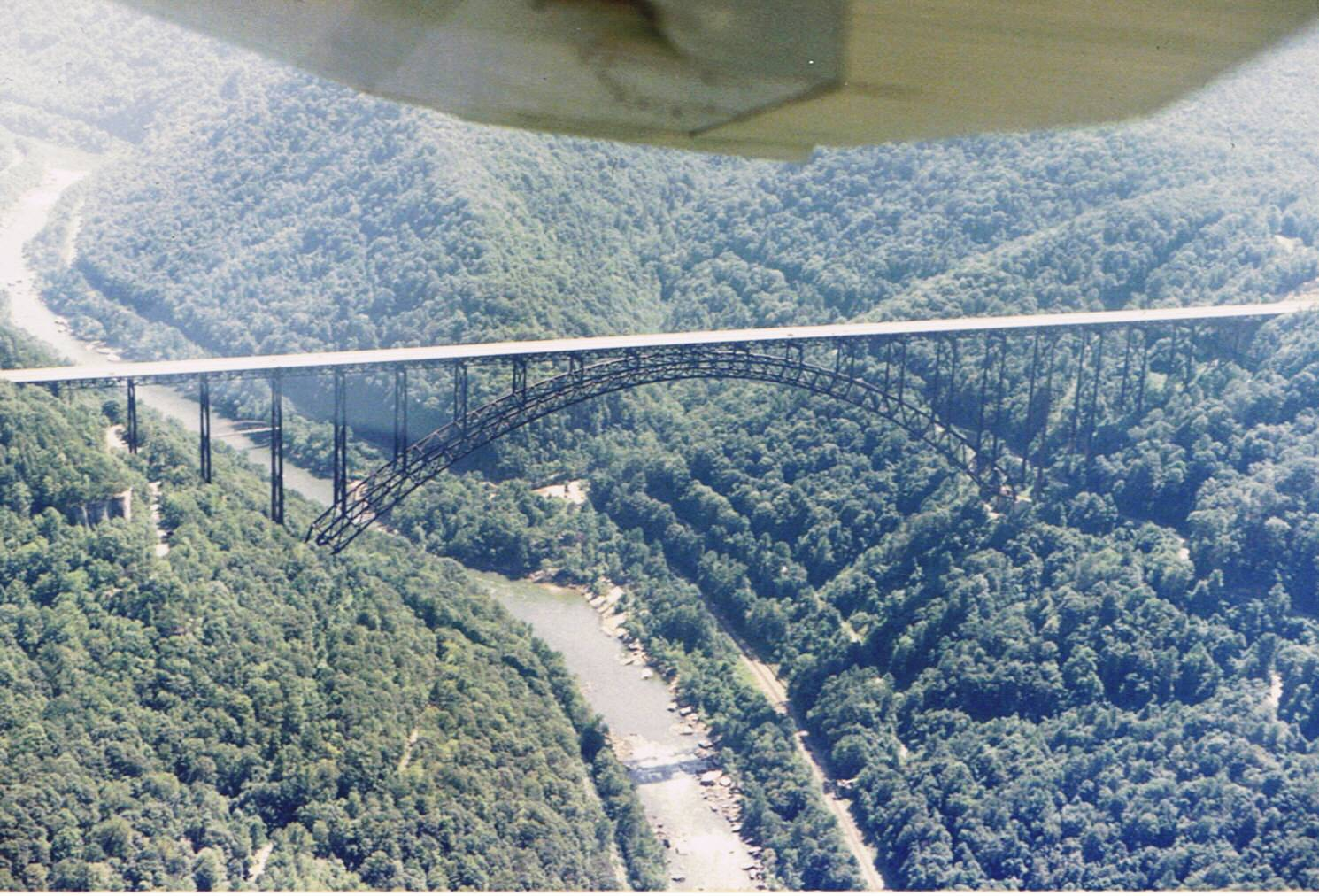
The New River Gorge Bridge as seen from a small fixed-wing airplane. The Tunney Hunsaker Bridge is also visible.

== See also ==
- 50 State Quarters
- List of bridges documented by the Historic American Engineering Record in West Virginia
- List of bridges in the United States by height
- List of bridges on the National Register of Historic Places in West Virginia
- List of highest bridges
- List of suicide sites
- Midland Trail, a nearby National Scenic Byway
- National Register of Historic Places listings in Fayette County, West Virginia
- New River Gorge National Park and Preserve, the park surrounding the bridge
