= Tunney Hunsaker Bridge =

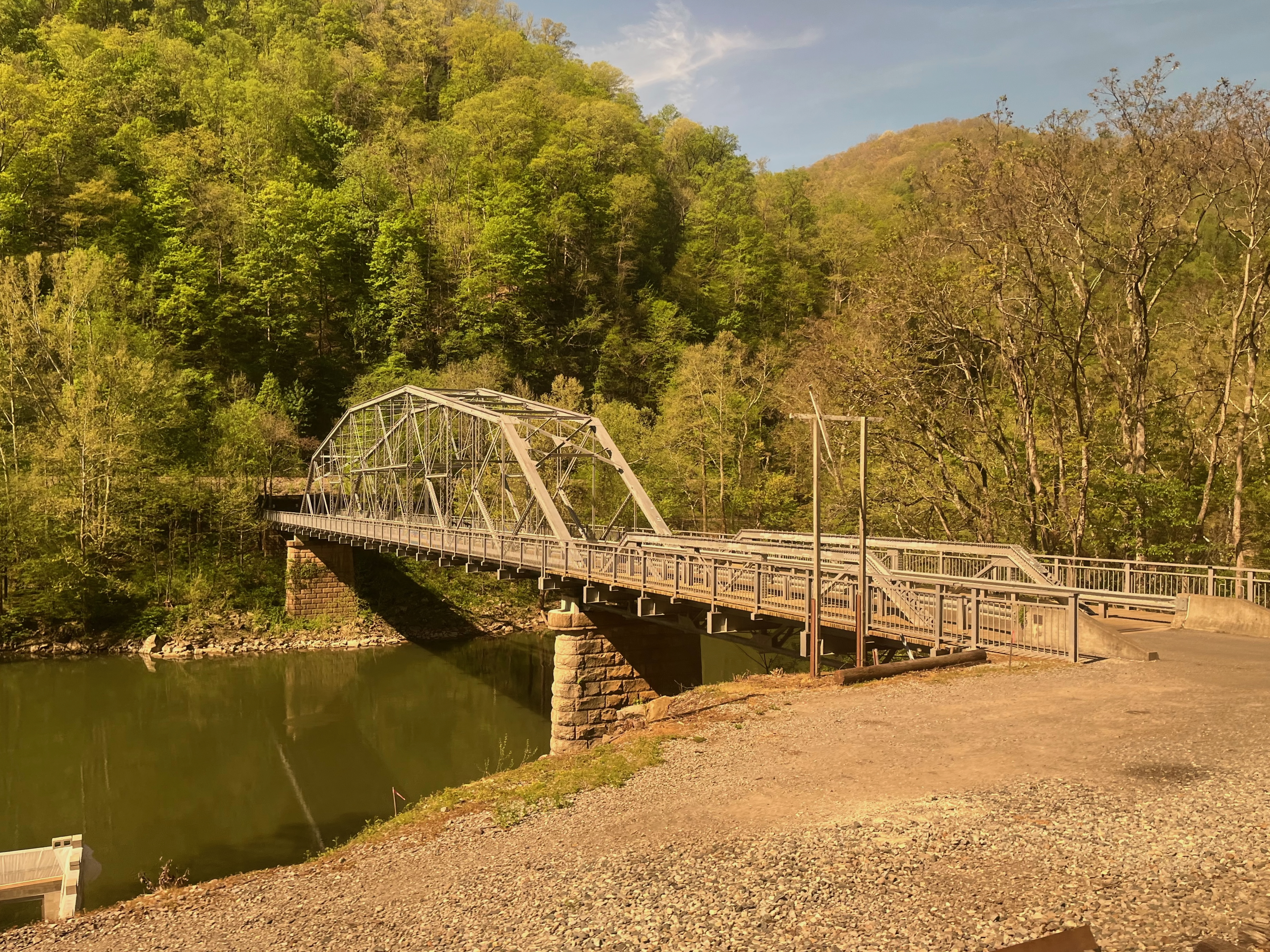
- The bridge in 2025
- Coordinates: 38°03′53″N 81°04′37″W
- Carries: CR-82 (Fayette Station Road)
- Crosses: New River
- Locale: Fayette County, West Virginia, U.S.

Characteristics
- Design: Metal 16 Panel Pin-Connected Pennsylvania Through Truss
- Total length: 421 ft (128 m)
- Width: 14.4 ft (4.4 m), single lane
- Longest span: 279 ft (85.0 m)

History
- Opened: 1889; 137 years ago rehabilitated 1997; 29 years ago

Location
- Interactive map of Tunney Hunsaker Bridge

The Tunney Hunsaker Bridge (also known as the Fayette Station Bridge) is an historic truss bridge over the New River in New River Gorge, West Virginia. The bridge is named after Tunney Hunsaker, American boxer and former chief-of-police at Fayetteville, West Virginia.

== Details ==
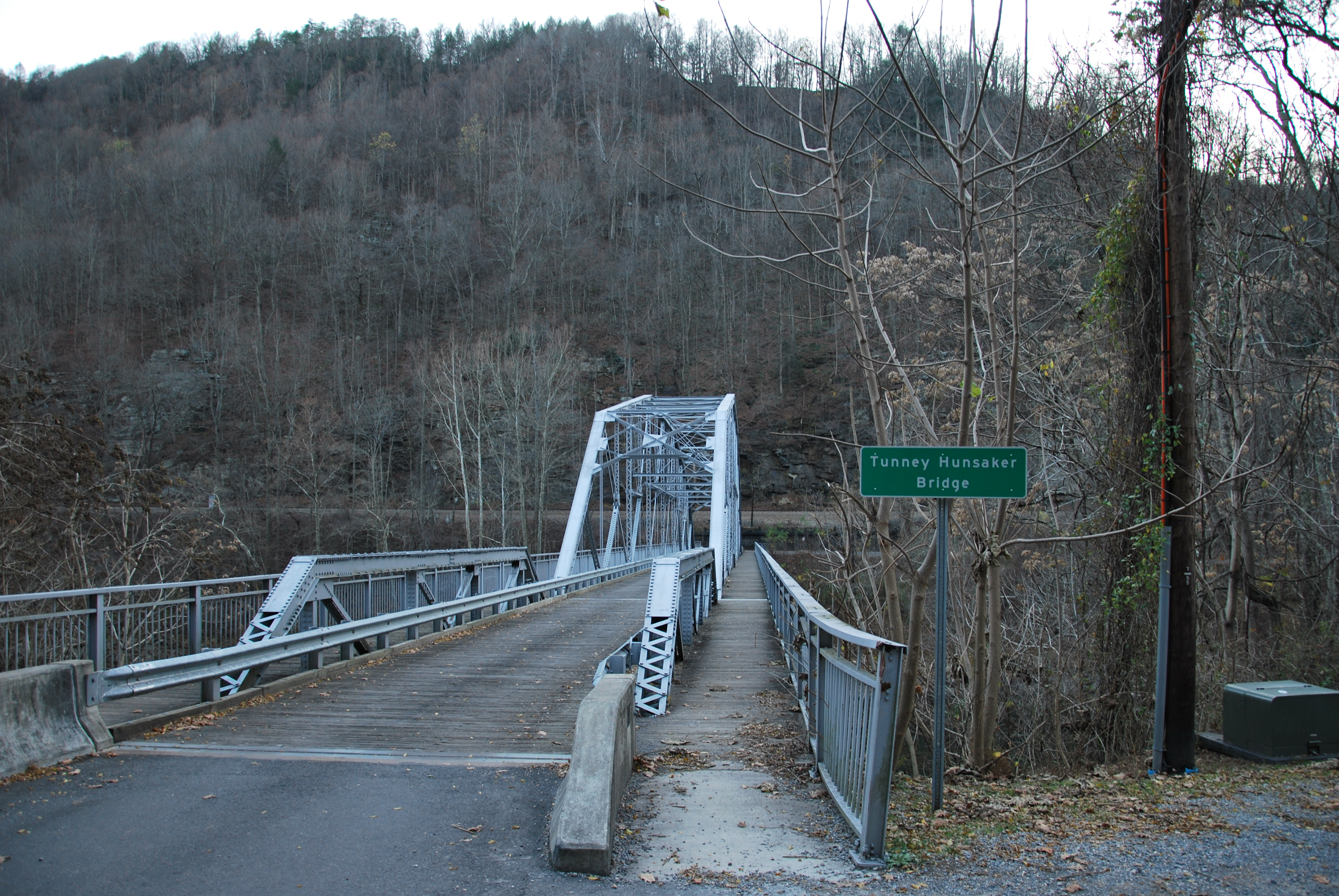
Deck of the bridge in 2010

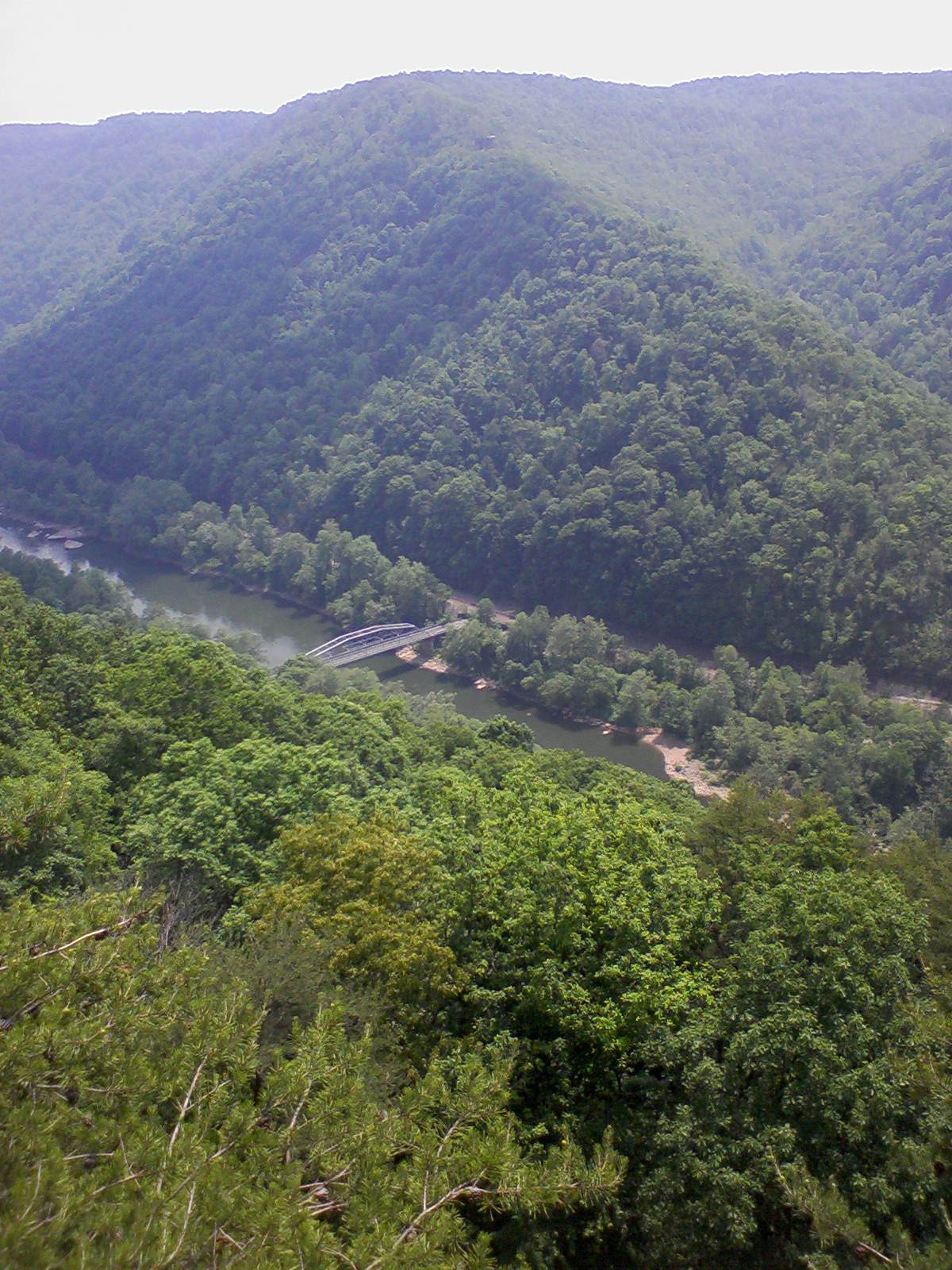
Aerial view in 2007

The bridge is a single-lane truss bridge consisting of one main span (279 ft (85.0 m) long) and two approach spans, a total length of 421 ft (128 m) that carries County Road 82 (Fayette Station Road) over the New River.

== History ==
Construction of the bridge was completed in 1889 by the Virginia Bridge and Iron Company of Roanoke, Virginia. When the New River Gorge Bridge opened in 1977, the bridge, in a deteriorated state, was closed to traffic, and was rehabilitated and reopened in 1997.

== Sources ==
- Trowbridge, David J., Philip Parlier, and Allison Frazier. "Fayette Station Bridge (Tunney Hunsaker Bridge)." Clio: Your Guide to History. August 3, 2020. Accessed April 17, 2021. https://www.theclio.com/entry/42242
