= Tunney Hunsaker =

American boxer (1930–2005)

Personal information
- Born: Tunney Morgan Hunsaker; September 1, 1930 Princeton, Caldwell County, Kentucky, USA
- Died: April 27, 2005 (aged 74)

Boxing career

Boxing record
- Total fights: 33
- Wins: 17
- Win by KO: 8
- Losses: 15
- Draws: 1

Tunney Morgan Hunsaker (September 1, 1930 – April 27, 2005) was an American professional boxer who is best remembered as the first professional opponent of boxing great Cassius Clay, later known as Muhammad Ali. Outside of his boxing career, Hunsaker served many years as the Police Chief of Fayetteville, West Virginia.

== Early life ==
He was born in the Western Kentucky town of Princeton, in Caldwell County. In his youth he served in the United States Air Force, stationed at Lackland Air Force Base in San Antonio, Texas.

== Boxing career ==
In 1960, Hunsaker was Cassius Clay's (later Muhammad Ali) first opponent in a professional boxing bout. After the fight Hunsaker said, "Clay was as fast as lightning ... I tried every trick I knew to throw at him off balance but he was just too good". In a thumbnail profile of the fight the following January, young Cassius was reported as having remarked that Hunsaker's style was far different from what Clay had been exposed to as an amateur and Olympian; the young fighter admitted to nervousness going in, and that Hunsaker's aforementioned pro style, had given him trouble. This respect appears genuine, as it was lasting—in his autobiography, Ali said Hunsaker dealt him one of the hardest body blows he ever took in his career. Ali and Hunsaker became good friends and stayed in touch over the years. Hunsaker said he did not agree with Ali's decision to refuse military service, but praised him as a great humanitarian and athlete. Learning of Hunsaker's passing, Ali commented to WV Public Radio, "I have fought better fighters but none with a bigger heart."

In the fight game, Hunsaker was a small heavyweight, perhaps better suited for light-heavy classification (175 lbs. limit); today, he would most likely compete as a cruiserweight (190 lbs. limit). He fought as a boxer-puncher, by his own telling. Hunsaker once appeared on the undercard at Madison Square Garden. Hunsaker ended up with a record of 17 wins with 15 defeats with 8 wins by knockout. His career ended after a boxing-related head injury suffered on April 6, 1962, in Beckley, West Virginia. Rushed to a Beckley hospital, Hunsaker was in a coma for 9 days during which he underwent two brain operations.

== Law enforcement career ==
Hunsaker became the youngest police chief in the history of West Virginia, going on to serve as Fayetteville police chief for 38 years. He was later inducted into the Law Enforcement Hall Of Fame.

== Personal life ==
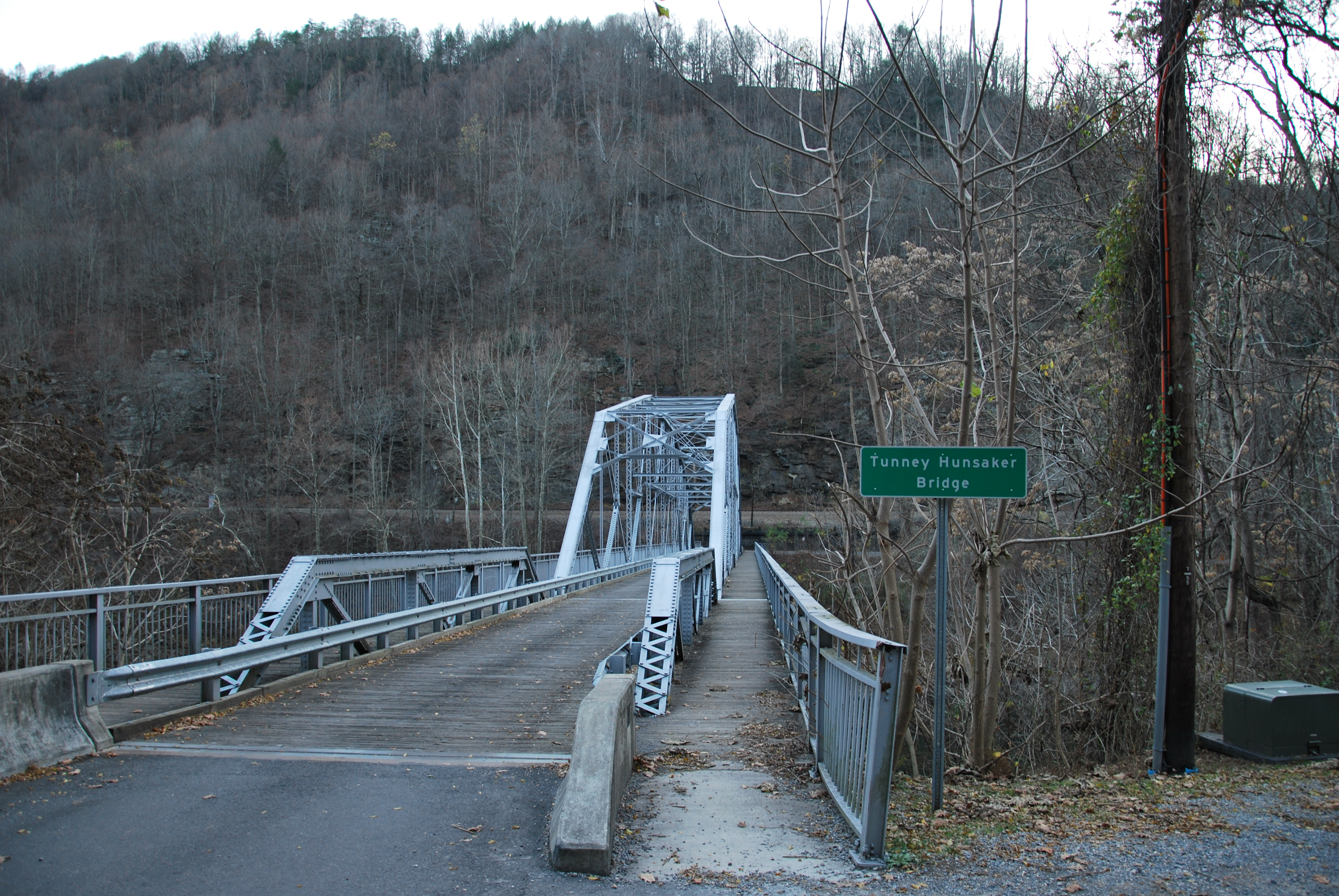
Tunney Hunsaker Bridge

Hunsaker was active in the Oak Hill Church of the Nazarene for many years, teaching a Sunday School class for fifth and sixth grade boys. He was three times named Sunday School Teacher of the Year. At the time of his death in 2005 he had been married to wife Patricia for over thirty years.

In the US state of West Virginia, the Fayette Station Bridge carrying County Route 82 over the New River at the bottom of New River Gorge was named after him.

== Death ==
Hunsaker suffered the physical effects of his last match for the rest of his life. He was 74 when he died on 27 April 2005, having been afflicted with Alzheimer's disease in his last years. His body was buried in Huse Memorial Park cemetery, Fayetteville, West Virginia.

== Professional boxing record ==
17 Wins (8 knockouts, 9 decisions), 15 Losses (7 knockouts, 8 decisions), 1 Draw
| Result | Record | Opponent | Type | Round | Date | Location | Notes |
| Loss | 17–15–1 | (United States) Joe Shelton | KO | 10 | April 6, 1962 | (United States) Beckley-Raleigh County Convention Center, Beckley, West Virginia | Hunsaker knocked out at 2:43 of the tenth round. Hunsaker was in a coma for nine days following the fight. |
| Win | 17–14–1 | (United States) Thomas Dejarnette | KO | 1 | February 24, 1962 | (United States) West Virginia State Penitentiary, Moundsville, West Virginia | |
| Loss | 16–14–1 | (United States) Sonny Banks | KO | 2 | October 16, 1961 | (United States) Detroit, Michigan | |
| Loss | 16–13–1 | (United States) Thomas Dejarnette | TKO | 8 | September 28, 1961 | (United States) West Virginia State Penitentiary, Moundsville, West Virginia | Referee stopped the bout at 2:10 of the eighth round. |
| Win | 16–12–1 | (United States) Herman Wilson | TKO | 6 | August 22, 1961 | (United States) Fairgrounds Stadium, Louisville, Kentucky | |
| Loss | 15–12–1 | (United States) Tod Herring | UD | 10 | April 25, 1961 | (United States) City Auditorium, Houston, Texas | |
| Loss | 15–11–1 | (Argentina) Alejandro Lavorante | KO | 5 | March 21, 1961 | (United States) Freeman Coliseum, San Antonio, Texas | Hunsaker knocked out at 2:31 of the fifth round. |
| Loss | 15–10–1 | (United States) Cassius Clay | UD | 6 | October 29, 1960 | (United States) Freedom Hall, Louisville, Kentucky | Ali's first pro fight. |
| Loss | 15–9–1 | (United States) Tom McNeeley | TKO | 9 | April 12, 1960 | (United States) Boston Arena, Boston, Massachusetts | Referee stopped the bout at 1:30 of the ninth round. |
| Loss | 15–8–1 | (United States) Johnny Jenkins | SD | 6 | February 5, 1960 | (United States) Madison Square Garden, New York City | |
| Loss | 15–7–1 | (United States) Jim O'Connell | PTS | 10 | January 16, 1960 | (United States) Kenova, West Virginia | |
| Loss | 15–6–1 | (United States) Hosea Chapman | UD | 12 | November 14, 1959 | (United States) Memorial Auditorium, Fayetteville, West Virginia | West Virginia Heavyweight Title. |
| Loss | 15–5–1 | (United States) Bert Whitehurst | TKO | 10 | September 30, 1959 | (United States) Charlotte, North Carolina | |
| Loss | 15–4–1 | (United States) Ernie Terrell | PTS | 8 | July 24, 1959 | (United States) Freedom Hall, Louisville, Kentucky | |
| Win | 15–3–1 | (United States) Bennie Thomas | PTS | 8 | July 1, 1959 | (United States) Louisville, Kentucky | |
| Draw | 14–3–1 | (United States) Hosea Chapman | SD | 12 | June 20, 1959 | (United States) Ravenswood, West Virginia | West Virginia Heavyweight Title. |
| Win | 14–3 | (United States) Billy Walters | KO | 1 | May 2, 1959 | (United States) Fayetteville, West Virginia | |
| Win | 13–3 | (United States) Terrell Pruitt | UD | 6 | March 28, 1959 | (United States) Freedom Hall, Louisville, Kentucky | |
| Win | 12–3 | Tiny Gibson | KO | 3 | September 30, 1958 | (United States) Fayetteville, West Virginia | |
| Win | 11–3 | (United States) Herbert Hair | KO | 2 | August 16, 1958 | (United States) Memorial Auditorium, Fayetteville, West Virginia | |
| Loss | 10–3 | (United States) Emil Brtko | KO | 2 | June 23, 1958 | (United States) High School Stadium, Charleroi, Pennsylvania | Hunsaker knocked out at 1:58 of the second round. |
| Win | 10–2 | (United States) Jim Saddler | SD | 6 | June 9, 1953 | (United States) Municipal Auditorium, San Antonio, Texas | |
| Win | 9–2 | (United States) O'Neal Crocker | TKO | 4 | June 2, 1953 | (United States) Ringside Club, Houston, Texas | |
| Win | 8–2 | (United States) Carl Griffin | KO | 1 | April 20, 1953 | (United States) Dallas Sportatorium, Dallas, Texas | Griffin knocked out at 1:11 of the first round. |
| Win | 7–2 | (United States) Joe Arthur | SD | 10 | March 10, 1953 | (United States) Municipal Auditorium, San Antonio, Texas | |
| Win | 6–2 | (United States) Ranchero Alonzo | PTS | 8 | February 10, 1953 | (United States) Municipal Auditorium, San Antonio, Texas | |
| Loss | 5–2 | (United States) Ranchero Alonzo | PTS | 6 | December 30, 1952 | (United States) Municipal Auditorium, San Antonio, Texas | |
| Loss | 5–1 | (United States) Whitey Berlier | PTS | 10 | November 5, 1952 | (United States) Houston, Texas | |
| Win | 5–0 | (United States) Pat Viola | UD | 6 | October 20, 1952 | (United States) Municipal Auditorium, San Antonio, Texas | |
| Win | 4–0 | (United States) Jesus Vargas | KO | 3 | October 7, 1952 | (United States) Municipal Auditorium, San Antonio, Texas | |
| Win | 3–0 | (United States) Ranchero Alonzo | PTS | 6 | September 23, 1952 | (United States) Municipal Auditorium, San Antonio, Texas | |
| Win | 2–0 | (United States) Pat Viola | PTS | 6 | July 31, 1952 | (United States) Austin, Texas | |
| Win | 1–0 | (United States) Pat Viola | UD | 4 | July 22, 1952 | (United States) Municipal Auditorium, San Antonio, Texas | |
