= Cassius Clay vs. Tunney Hunsaker =

1960 boxing match

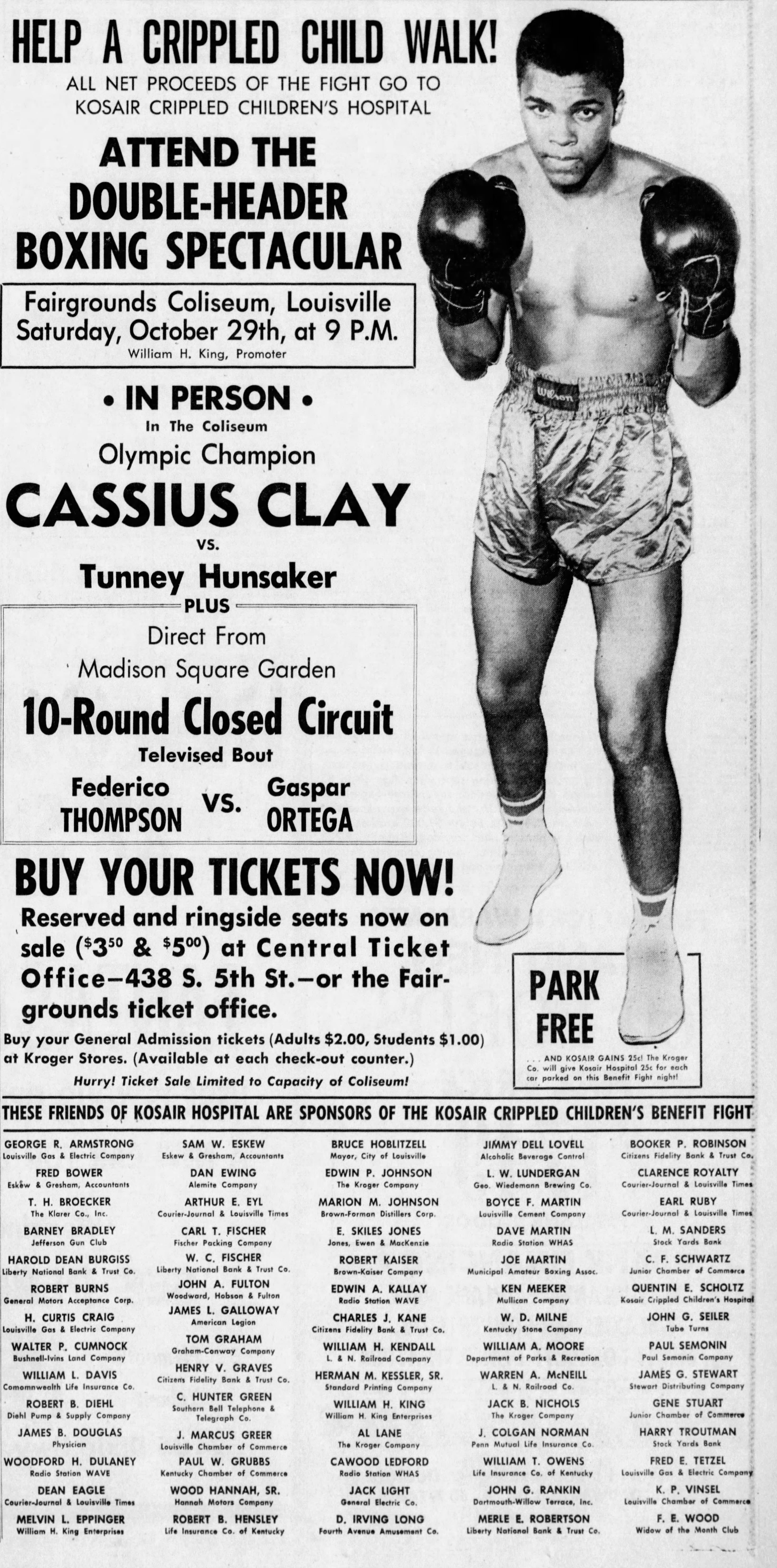
- Advertisement for the fight in The Courier-Journal
- Date: October 29, 1960
- Venue: Freedom Hall, Louisville, Kentucky

Tale of the tape
Boxer	(United States) Cassius Clay	(United States) Tunney Hunsaker
Nickname	"The Louisville Lip"	
Hometown	Louisville, Kentucky	Fayetteville, West Virginia
Purse	$2,000	$300
Pre-fight record	0–0 (0 KO)	15–9–1 (8 KO)
Age	18 years, 9 months	30 years, 1 month
Height	6 ft 3 in (191 cm)	
Weight	192 lb (87 kg)	186 lb (84 kg)
Style	Orthodox	Orthodox
Recognition	1960 Olympic light heavyweight Gold Medallist	

Result
- Clay won in 6 rounds by unanimous decision

Cassius Clay vs. Tunney Hunsaker was a professional boxing match contested on October 29, 1960. It was the first professional bout contested by Muhammad Ali (then known as Cassius Clay).

== Background ==
In his professional debut, 1960 Olympic light heavyweight boxing champion Cassius Clay fought Tunney Hunsaker in a six-round match. The fight was advertised as having proceeds go towards Kosair Crippled Children Hospital.

== The fight ==
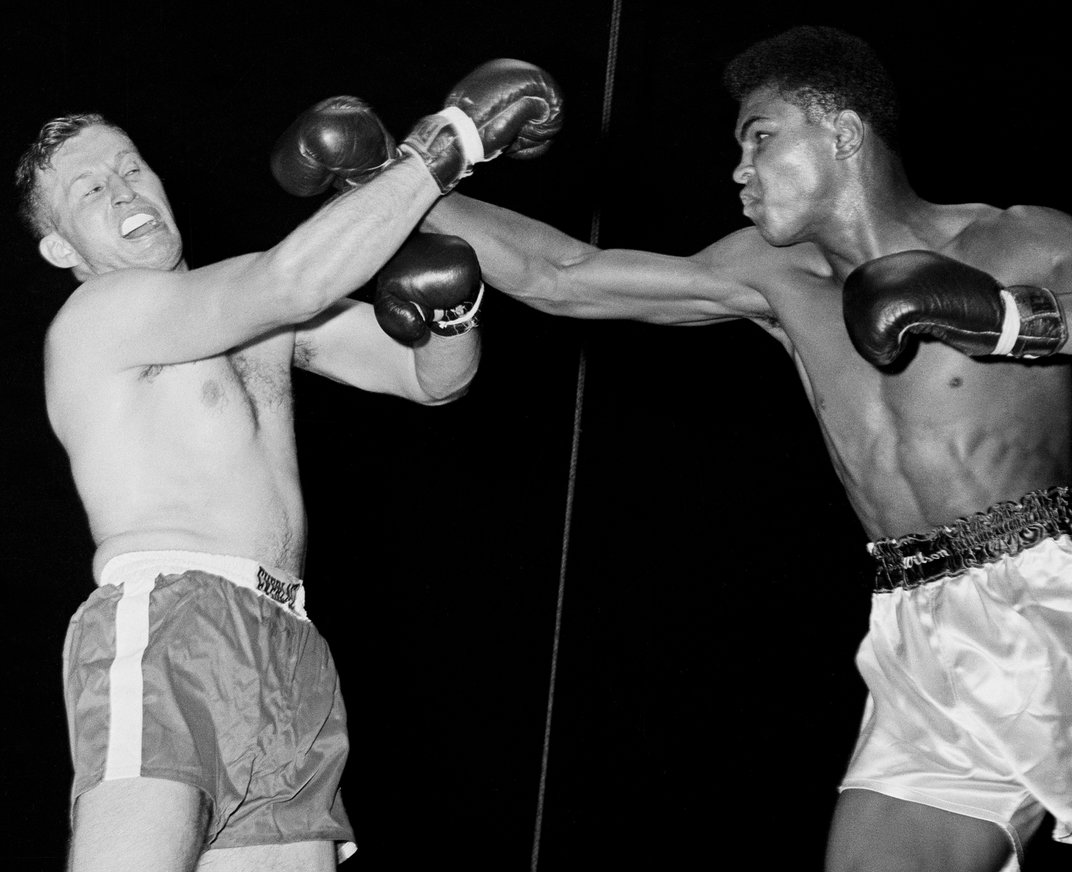

Clay won the bout through a unanimous decision on points, winning every round. Hunsaker's nose began to bleed in the third round and a cut opened over his eye in the fourth. Despite this, The Courier-Journal described the fight as "neither fighter ever had the other in trouble and gave the crowd of 6,180 little to cheer about".

== Aftermath ==
Hunsaker commented of Clay after the fight, "He's awfully good for an 18 year old and as fast as a middleweight", but also said he thought he won the first and last rounds and that Clay never hurt him at any time.

Hunsaker was a part-time boxer who was for many years a respected police officer in Fayetteville, West Virginia. He also helped to train young fighters, and he and Ali were friends for many years afterwards. In a 1980 Sports Illustrated article, Hunsaker said he didn't agree with Ali's refusal to be drafted during the Vietnam War, but that he still respected him greatly as a fighter and as a man.

== Undercard ==
Confirmed bouts:

Debut	Cassius Clay's bouts 29 October 1960	Succeeded by vs. Herb Siler
Preceded by vs. Tom McNeeley	Tunney Hunsaker's bouts 29 October 1960	Succeeded by vs. Alejandro Lavorante
